= Nishiōji Station =

Railway and metro station in Kyoto, Japan

Nishiōji Station 西大路駅
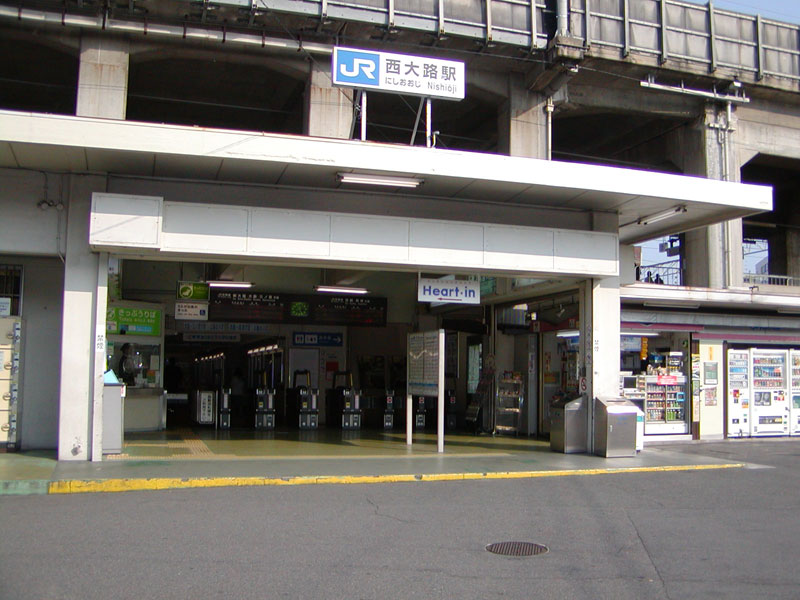
- Entrance to the station

General information
- Location: Minami, Kyoto, Kyoto; Japan
- Coordinates: 34°58′52″N 135°43′56″E
- Operator: JR West
- Line: Tōkaidō Main Line (JR Kyoto Line)

Construction
- Structure type: Elevated
- Accessible: Yes

Other information
- Station code: JR-A32

History
- Opened: 16 September 1938

Passengers
- FY 2023: 32,356 daily
Location

Nishiōji Station (西大路駅, Nishiōji-eki) is a railway station located in Minami-ku, Kyoto, Japan. It serves the JR Kyoto Line (Tōkaidō Main Line) of West Japan Railway Company. The distances to major stations are 2.5 km (1.6 mi) to Kyoto Station, 40.3 km (25.0 mi) to Osaka Station and 516.1 km (320.7 mi) to Tokyo Station.

The station was named after Nishiōji Street, which crosses the railway by an underground path beneath the station platforms. Nishiōji Oike Station, a subway station opened along the street (about 3 km (1.9 mi) north of this station) in 2008 was also tentatively called Nishiōji Station before the name was finalized.

== Trains ==
Trains of the JR Kyoto Line except special rapid service trains stop at the station, and rapid service trains pass in the morning.

== Station facilities ==
The tracks run east to west and the station building stands south of the tracks. On the tracks there are two island platforms. One of the platforms is located under the elevated tracks of Tōkaidō Shinkansen. Tracks No. 2 and 3 are for passenger use, with Tracks No. 1 and 4 fenced off as all trains on the outer tracks pass through this station without stopping.

1	■ JR Kyoto Line	Passing trains only
2	■ JR Kyoto Line	for Shin-Osaka, Osaka and Sannomiya
3	■ JR Kyoto Line	for Takatsuki and Kyoto
4	■ JR Kyoto Line	Passing trains only

== History ==
Nishiōji Station opened on 16 September 1938, as a stop of local electric train service, which was extended from Suita Station to Kyoto Station in 1937.

Station numbering was introduced to the station in March 2018 with Nishiōji Station being assigned station number JR-A32.

Barrier-free access construction was completed in March 2020 along with a renovation of the north station entrance.

== Surrounding area ==
Around the station is an industrial area. Headquarters of Wacoal and Horiba are located near the station. The yard of Kyoto Freight Terminal operated by Japan Freight Railway Company is also adjacent to Nishiōji Station.

== Adjacent stations ==
«	Service	»
JR Kyoto Line
Kyoto	Local (Including rapid service after the morning)	Katsuragawa
Rapid Service (in the morning): Does not stop at this station
Special Rapid Service: Does not stop at this station
Limited Express "Hida": Does not stop at this station
Limited Express "Kuroshio": Does not stop at this station
