= Sōji-ji (Osaka) =

Buddhist temple in Ibaraki, Osaka, Japan

- 総持寺
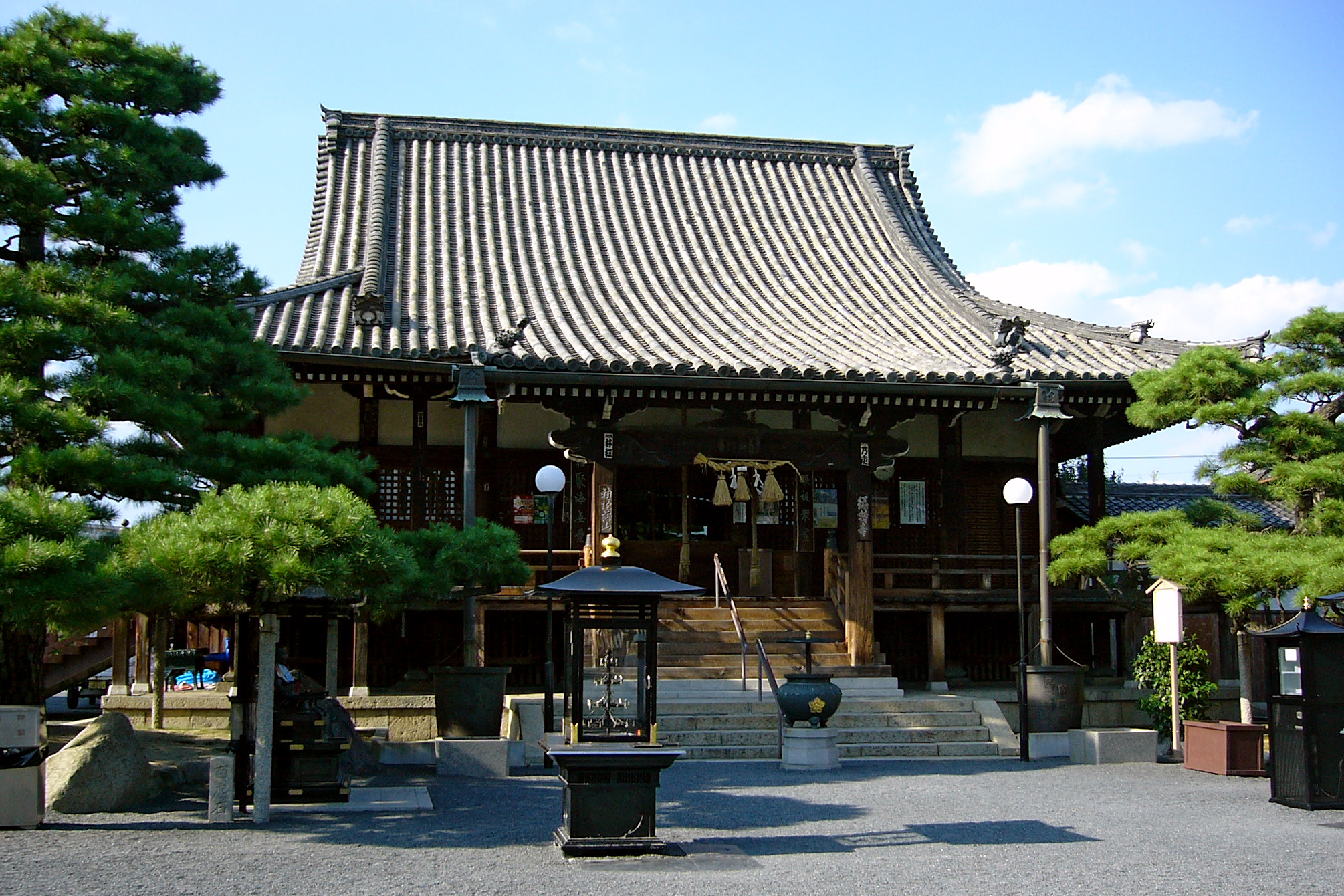
- Sōji-ji Hondō

- Location within Osaka Prefecture Location within Japan

Religion
- Affiliation: Buddhist
- Deity: Senjū Kannon Bosatsu
- Rite: Kōyasan Shingon-shū
- Status: functional

Location
- Location: 1-6-1 Sōjiji, Ibaraki-shi, Osaka-fu 567-0801
- Interactive map of Sōji-ji
- Coordinates: 34°49′44.77″N 135°34′53.65″E

Architecture
- Founder: c.Fujiwara no Yamakage
- Completed: c.879

Website
- Official website

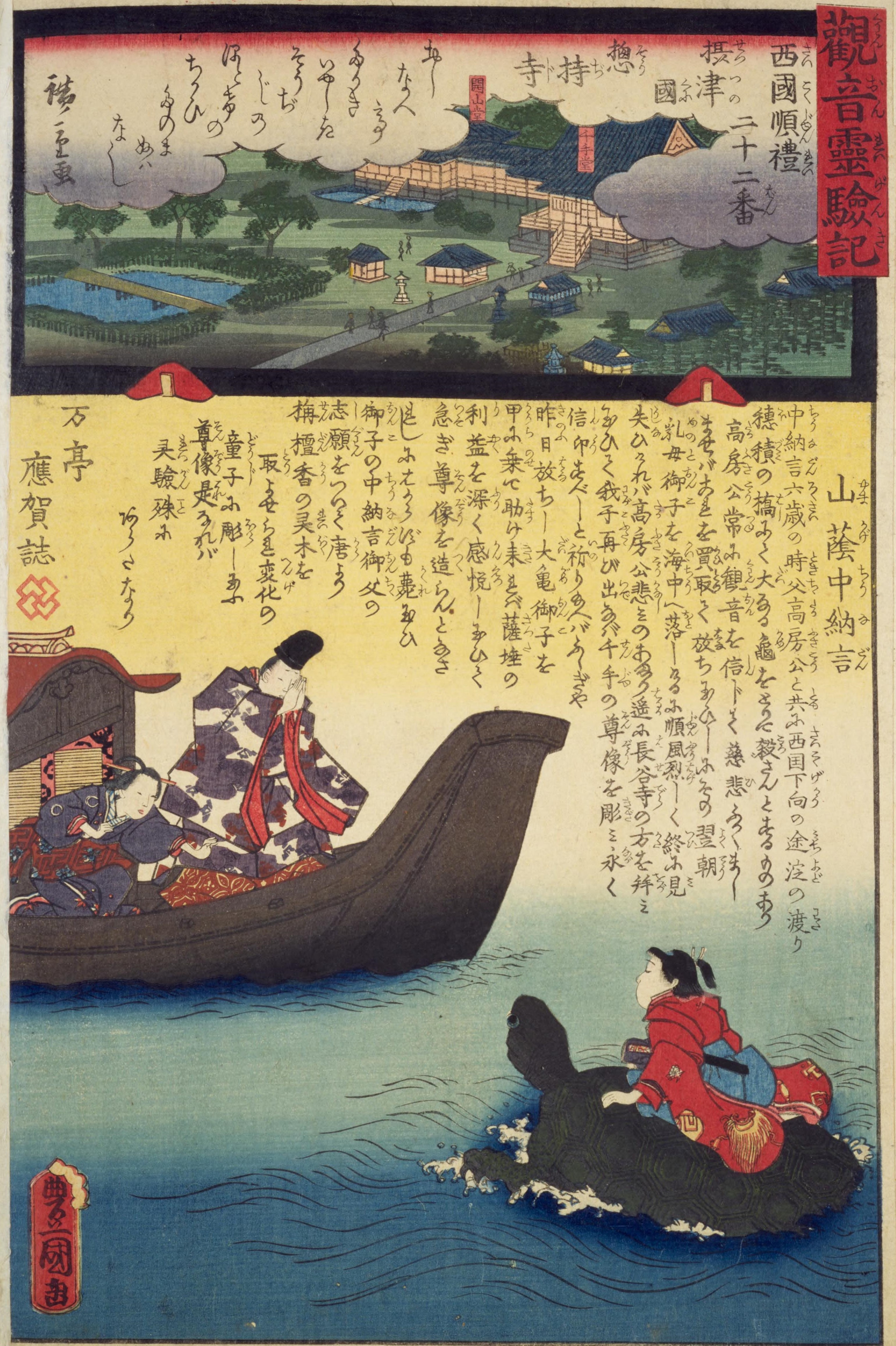
from the picture album "Kannon Reigen ki"

Sōji-ji (総持寺) is a Buddhist temple located in the Sōjiji neighborhood of the city of Ibaraki, Osaka Prefecture, Japan. It belongs to the Kōyasan Shingon-shū sect of Japanese Buddhism and its honzon (principle image) is a hibutsu (hidden / concealed image) statue of Senjū Jūichimen Kannon Bosatsu (Sahasrabhuja). The temple's full name is Fudaraku-san Katsuō-ji (補陀洛山 総持寺).The temple is the 22nd stop on the Saigoku Kannon Pilgrimage route.

== History ==
The details surrounding the founding of the temple are uncertain. According to legends found in the Konjaku Monogatari and Genpei Jōsuiki, Fujiwara no Takafusa, the father of the temple's founder, Fujiwara no Yamakage, was traveling down the Yodo River on his way to Dazaifu in Chikuzen Province to take up his post when he saw some fishermen capturing a large turtle. He bought the turtle and released it into the river, saying, "Today, the 18th, is Kannon's festival day." That night, Yamakage was tricked by his stepmother and fell into the river. Grieving, Takafusa prayed to Kannon, and the turtle he had rescued appeared before him, carrying Yamakage on its back. Grateful to Kannon, Takafusa made a vow to create a statue of Kannon, but he died before he could complete the task. Afterwards Fujiwara no Yamakage, following his father's wishes, had a statue of Senjū Kannon Bosatsu carved and enshrined there; this is said to be the origin of the temple.

According to temple legend, the temple was begun around 879 and completed in 890, the third anniversary of Yamakage's death. However, there is no documentary evidence to support these dates or the events in this legend.

It is known that the temple fell into decline after being burned down during the Tenshō era (1573-1593) by Oda Nobunaga, but the main hall was rebuilt and the grounds were restored by Toyotomi Hideyori in 1603.

== Shijō-ryū knife ceremony ==
Fujiwara no Yamakage is also known as the founder of the Shijō-ryū knife ceremony (四条流庖丁式) is which a chef prepares fish using only a knife and chopsticks, and without touching it with his hands. While Yamakage is considered the creator of this ceremony, there is no record of him ever having performed it himself. This ceremony is first recorded in the Kokinshu (Collection of Ancient and Modern Japanese Texts) in 1136, when Fujiwara no Ienari demonstrated carp knife-cutting in front of Emperor Shirakawa.

== Images of the temple ==
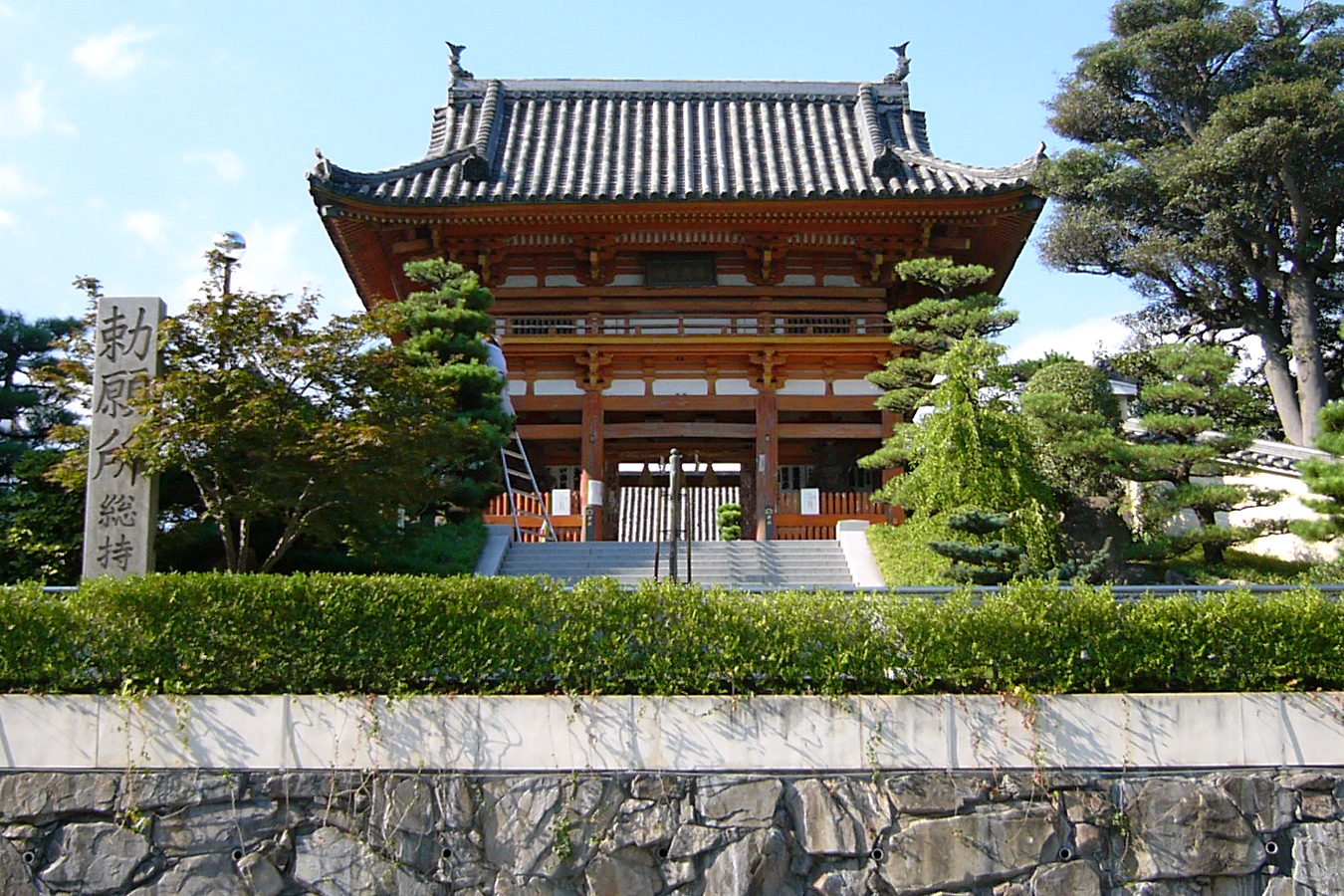
Niōmon

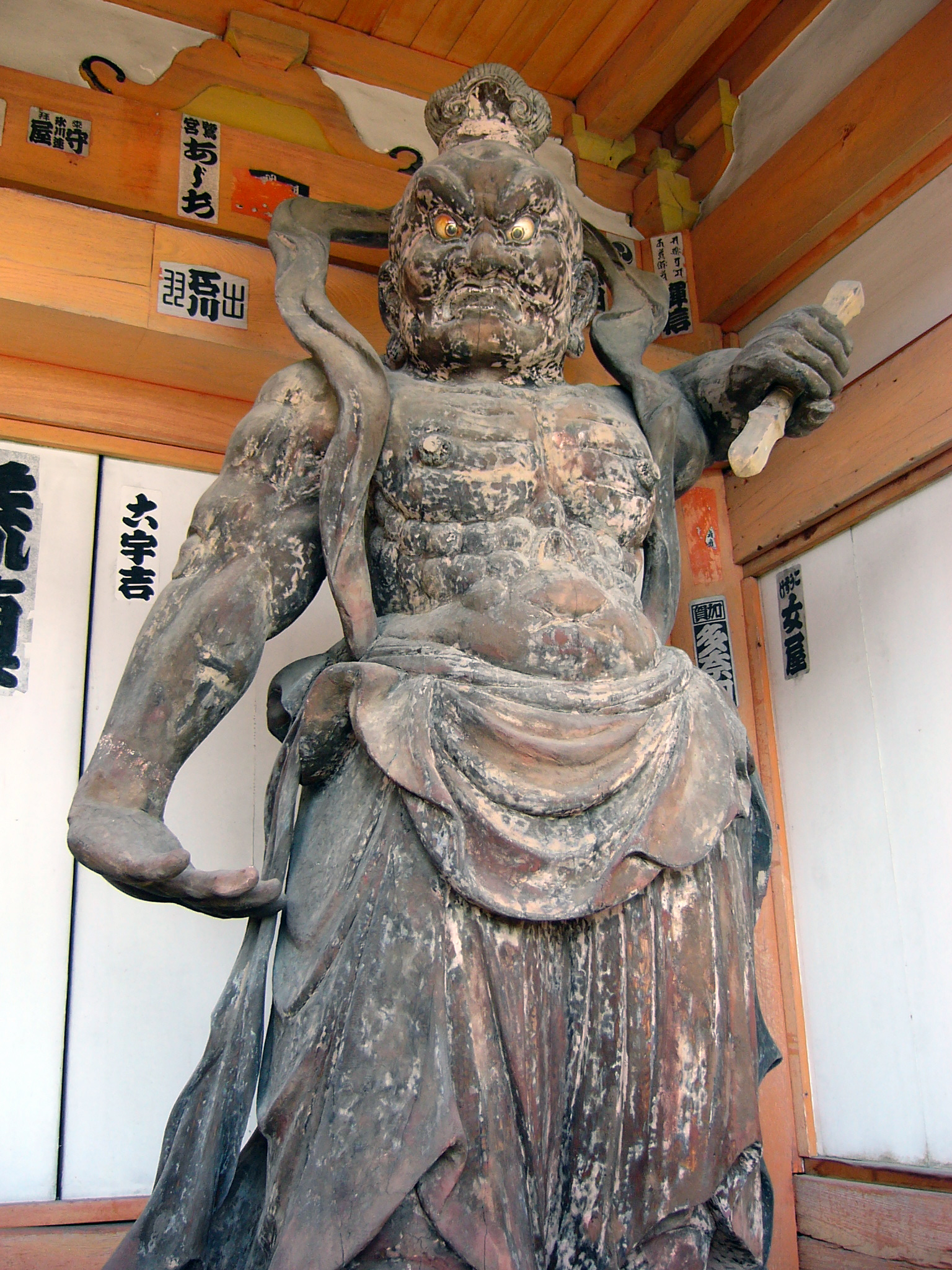
Niō statue

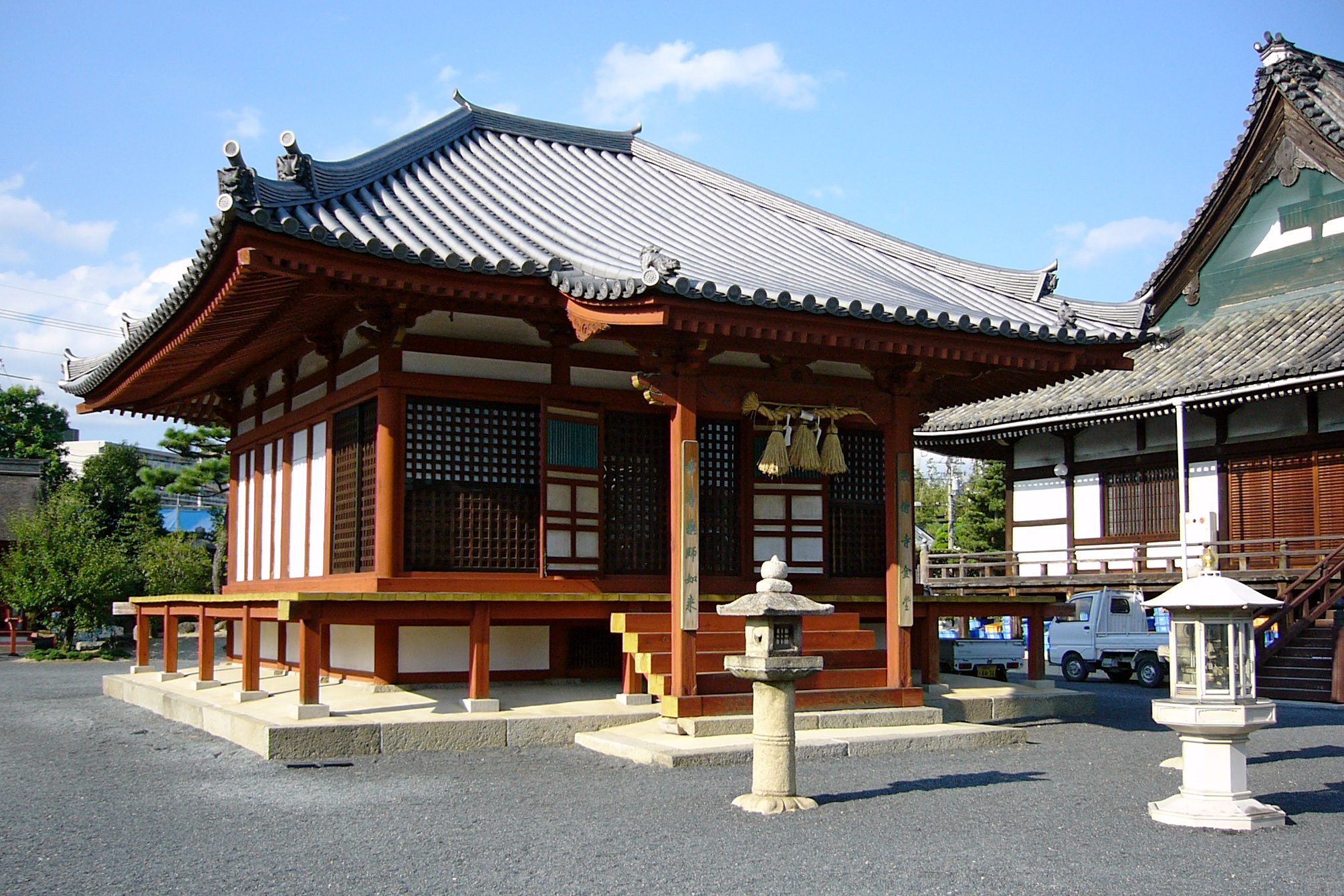
Yakushi-dō

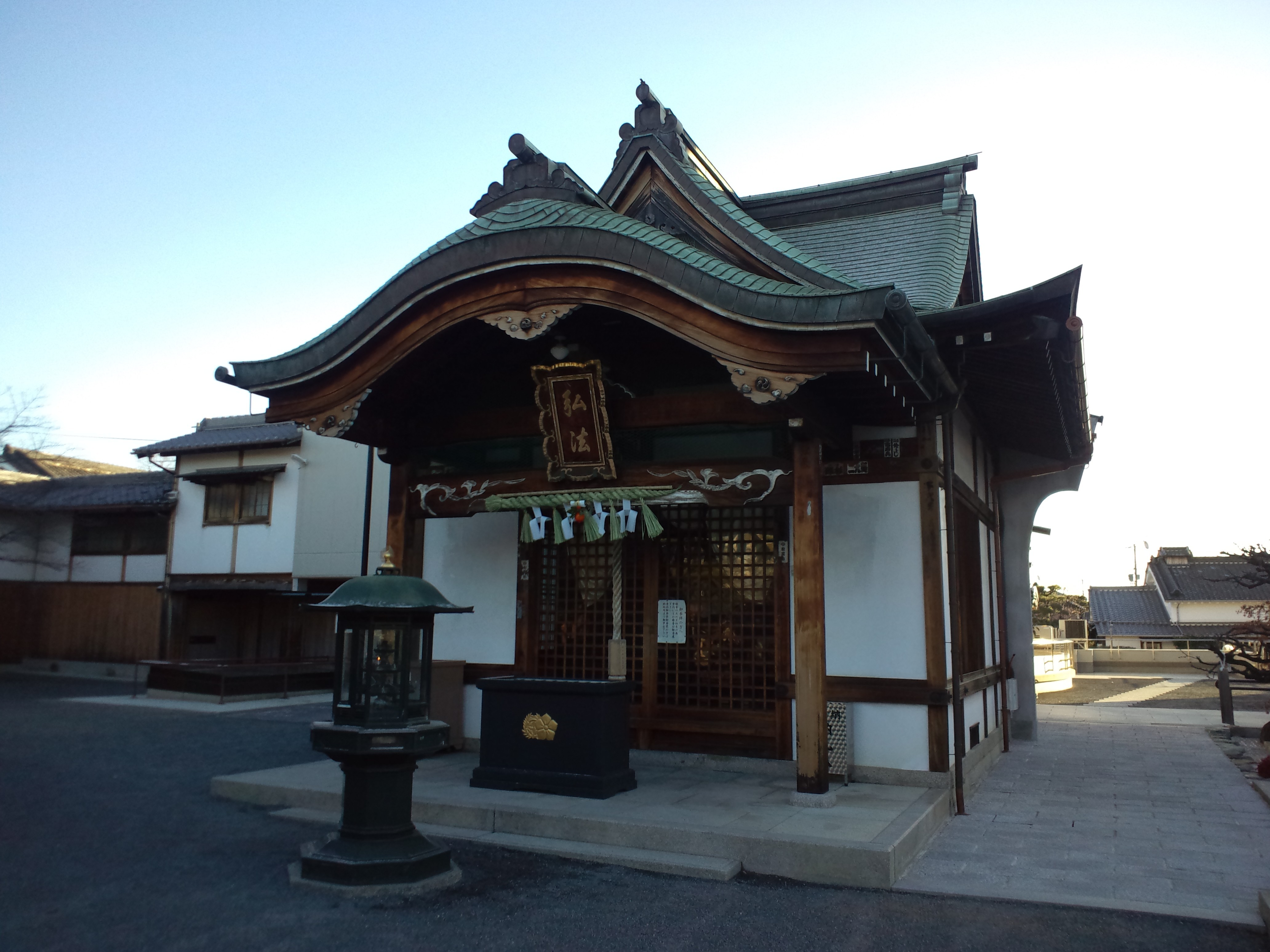
Daishi-dō

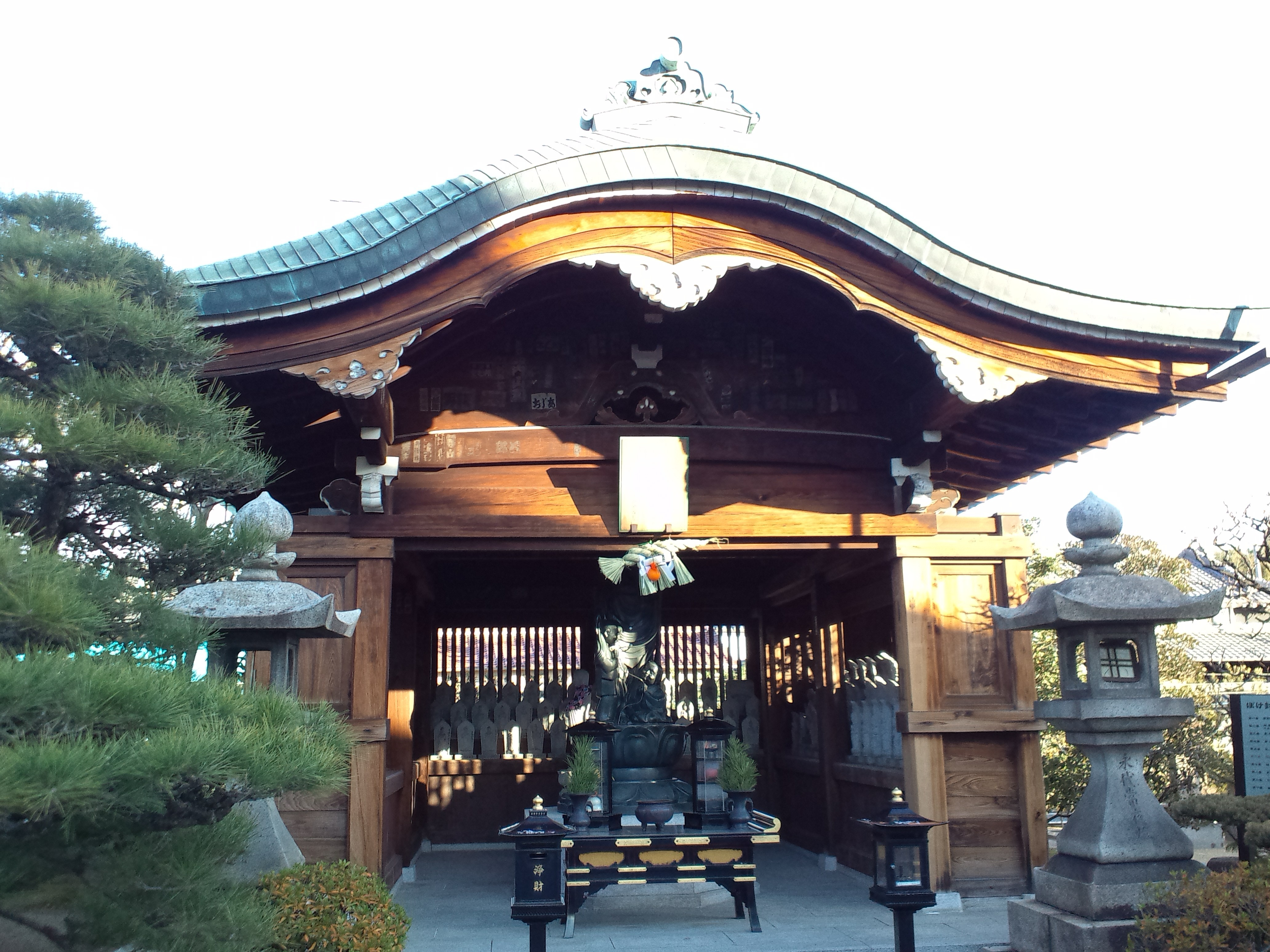
Kannon-dō

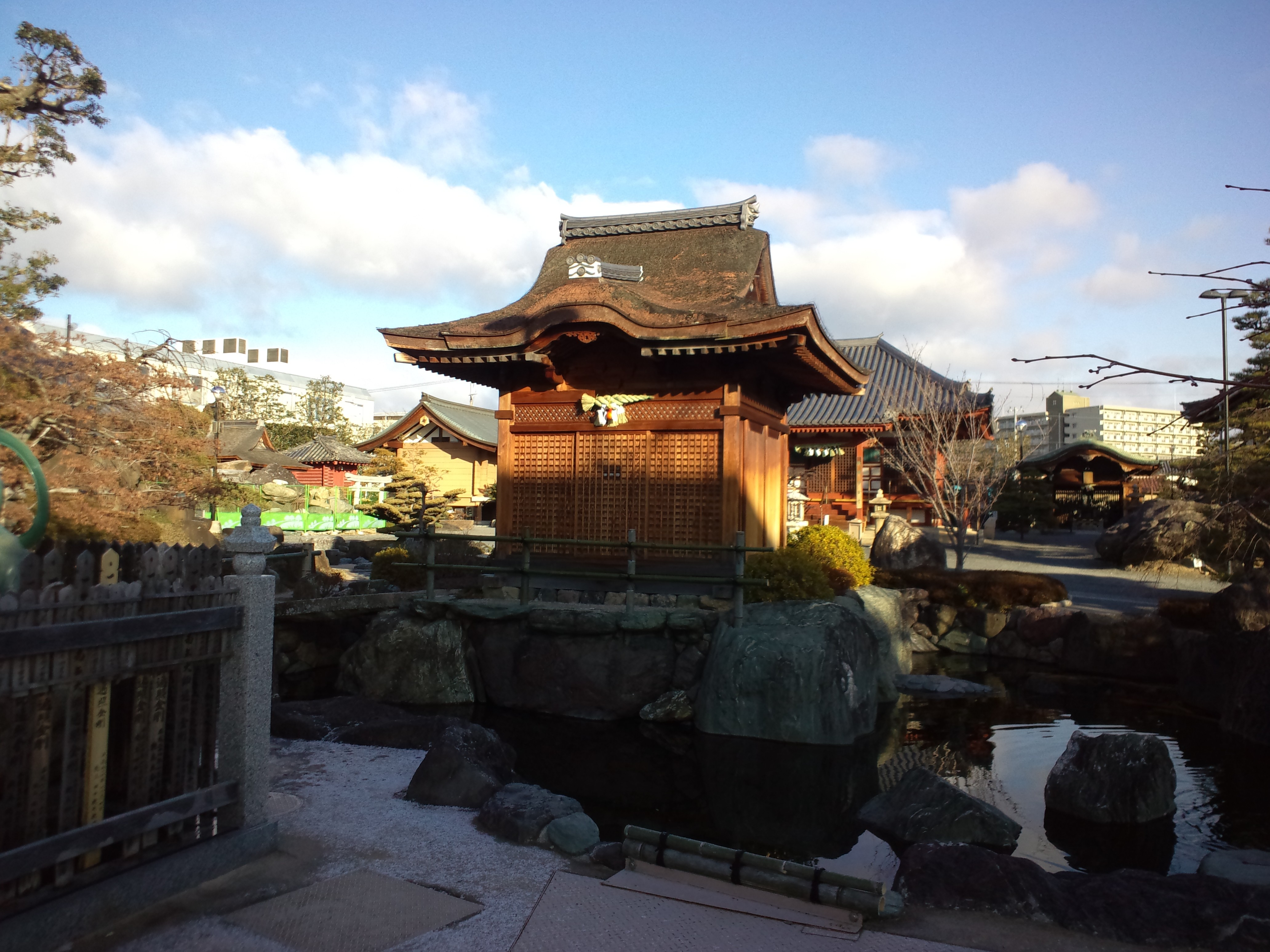
Emma-dō

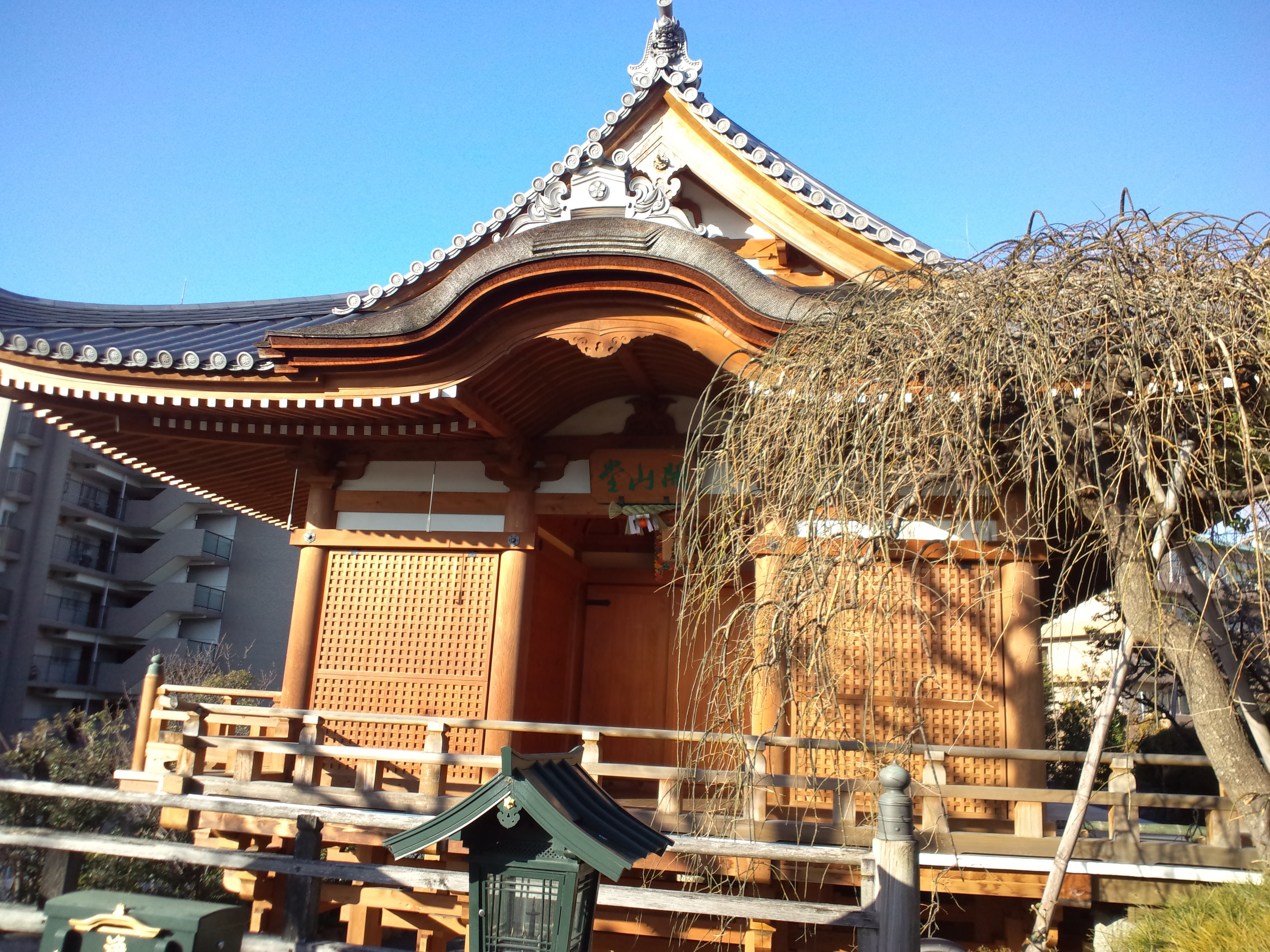
Kaisan-dō

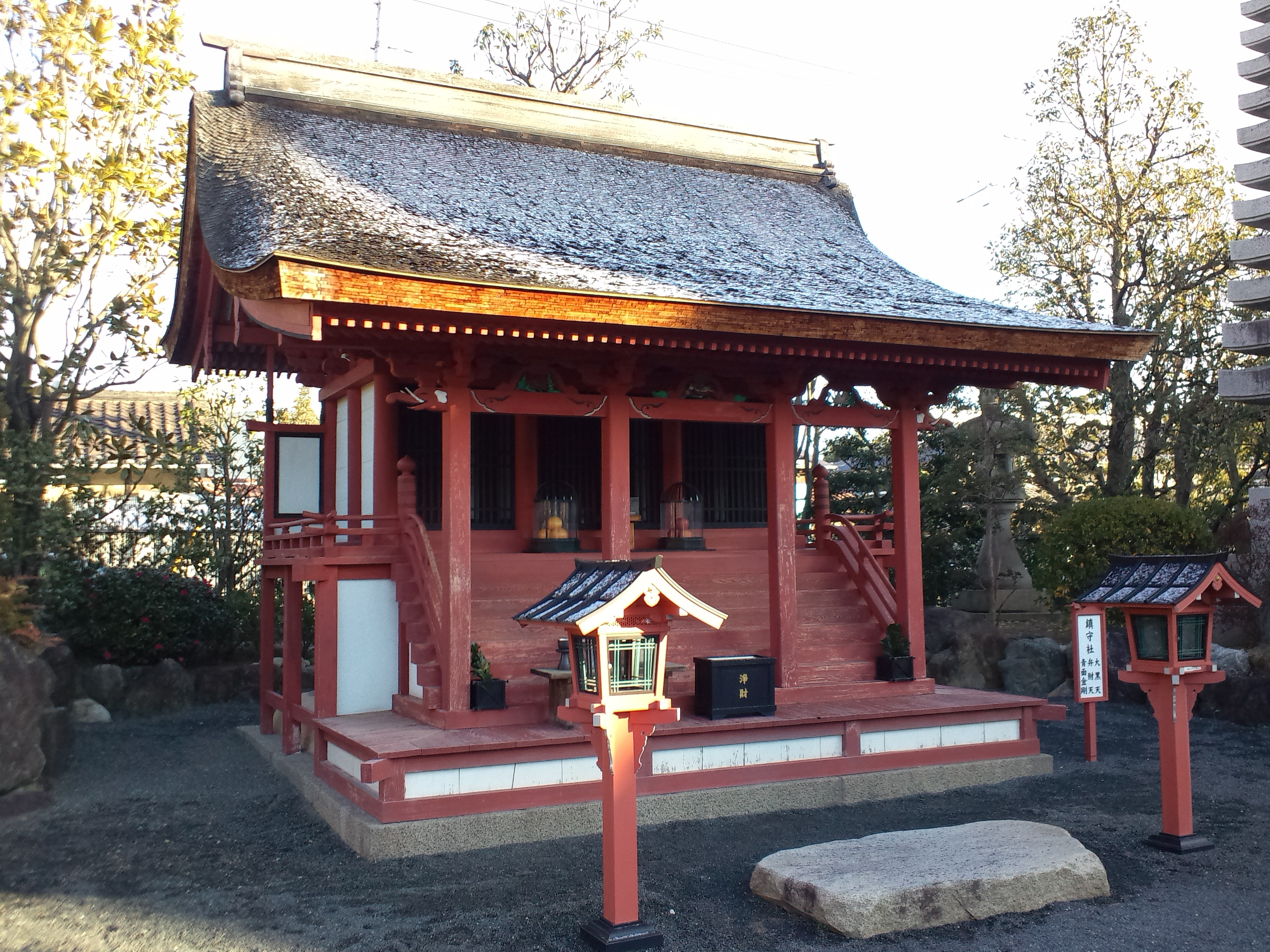
Chinju-sha

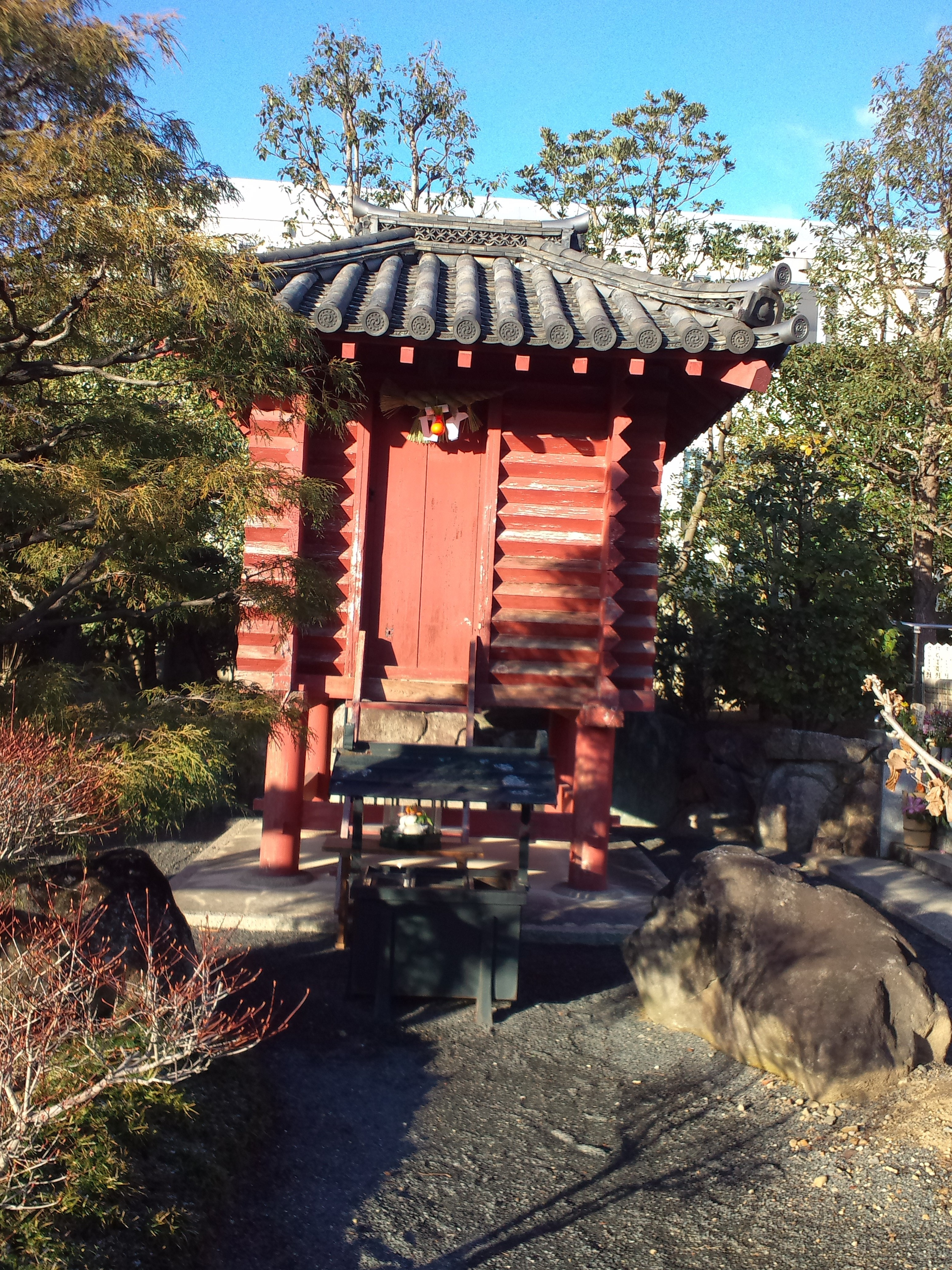
Kyōzō

== Access ==
The temple is approximately a five-minute walk from JR-Sōjiji Station on the JR West JR Kyoto Line (Tōkaidō Main Line).

== Cultural Properties ==
The temple contains a number of designated Tangible Cultural Properties.

=== Ibaraki City Tangible Cultural Properties ===
- Sōji-ji structures (総持寺（本堂・薬師金堂・仁王門・如来荒神堂・宝蔵・鎮守社・東門・庫裏・鐘楼） 附 棟札・宮殿形厨子), Edo period; Nine buildings of Sōji-ji have been designated collectively as an Ibaraki City Tangible Cultural Property. These include the Hondō, Yakushi-Kondō, Niōmon, Nyorai-Konji-dō, Treasury, Chinju-sha, East Gate, Kuri and Shōrō.
- Sōjiji Engi Emaki (紙本著色 総持寺縁起絵巻), Edo period; The Sōjiji Engi Emaki (picture scroll) is one of two auspicious picture scrolls housed at Sōji-ji. It depicts the miraculous tales surrounding the temple's founding. It consists of nine sections of text and eight sections of illustration. The first seven sections explain the temple's origins, while the eighth section recounts its founding and subsequent prosperity as it attracted the support of nobles. The ninth section describes the temple's subsequent state of disrepair and calls for donations. While the author of the text is unknown, the illustrations are known to have been painted by Kaiho Yusetsu (1598-1677) based on the signature and seal.
- Sōjiji Engi Emaki (紙本著色 総持寺縁起絵巻), Edo period (1727); This picture scroll is the second of two auspicious picture scrolls housed at Sōji-ji, depicting the miraculous tales surrounding the temple's founding. Comprising nine sections of text and eight sections of illustration, it tells the story of the construction of the temple's principal image, the Eleven-Headed Thousand-Armed Kannon, and the origins of the temple's founding. Both the text and illustrations essentially follow the content of Kaihō Yūsetsu's "Sojiji Engi Emaki." While the artist of the illustrations is unknown, their brushwork suggests they were created by an artist of the Tosa school, a school of Yamato-e painting. The text is a compilation of nine artists, each responsible for a separate section. The colophon lists the names of the princes and nobles who wrote the text.
- Kannon Emaki (観音縁起), Muromachi period; This scroll is a calligraphy piece in ink on paper, consisting of 14 sheets of paper, bound in a scroll. The title reads "Kannon Engi" (The Origin of Kannon), but the content is nearly identical to the legend in the "Sojiji Engi Emaki" scroll by Kaiho Yusetsu, which is housed at Sojiji,
- Sōjiji Kiln ruins (総持寺瓦窯跡), Muromachi period; This is a ridge-style flat kiln for firing roof tiles, and was discovered during excavations on the eastern slope of the Soji-ji temple grounds. Based on their structure and layout, the two kilns discovered are thought to have been in operation mainly during the Muromachi period; Kiln No. 1 has its firebox facing east, while Kiln No. 2 has its firebox facing north, and the two share a front yard.,
