= Kishibe Station =

Railway station in Suita, Osaka Prefecture, Japan

Kishibe Station 岸辺駅
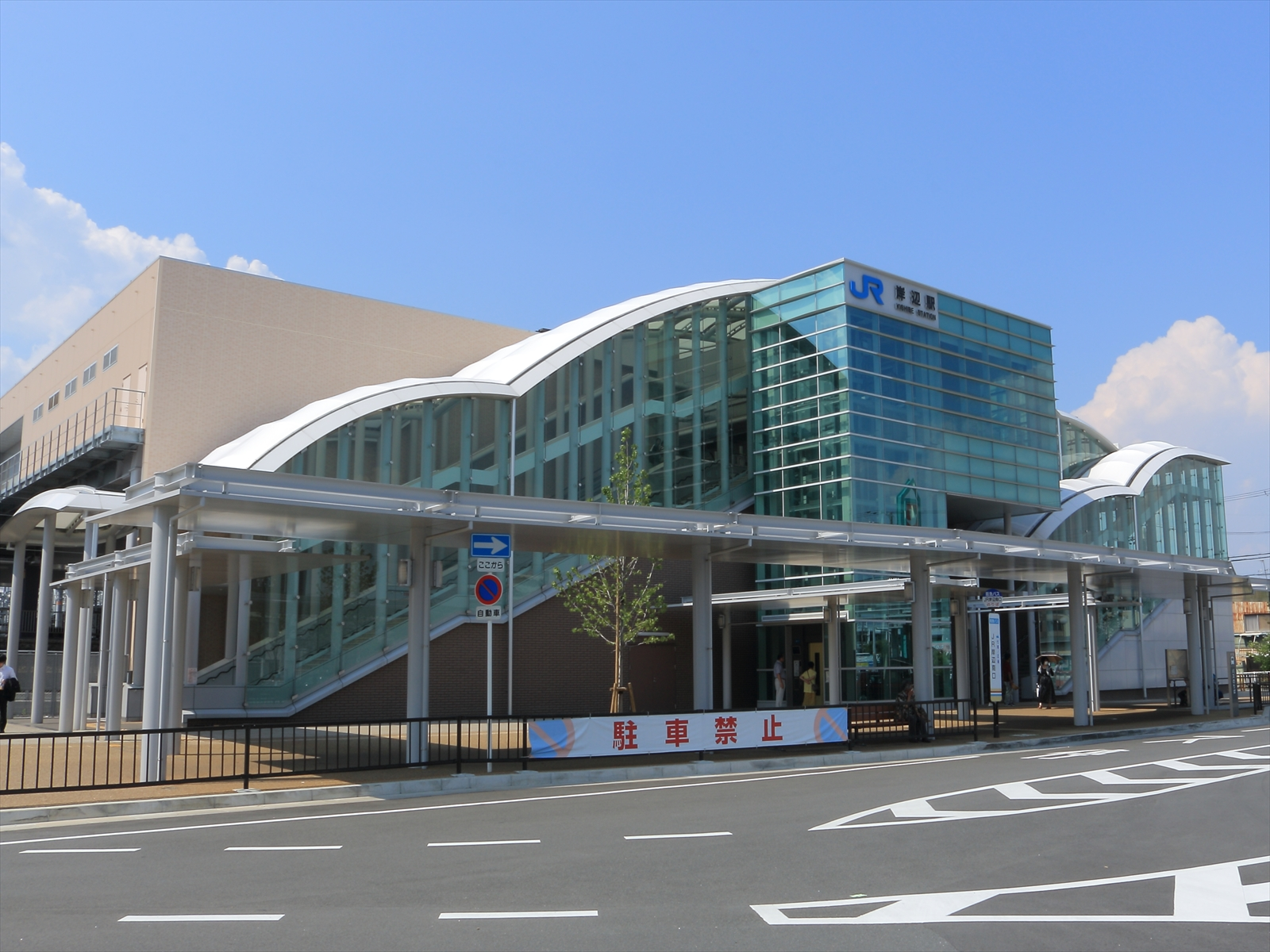
- Kishibe Station, 2015

General information
- Location: 1 Chome-16-1 Kishibeminami, Suita-shi, Osaka-fu 564-0011; Japan
- Coordinates: 34°46′36.53″N 135°32′29.84″E
- Operator: JR West
- Lines: A Tōkaidō Main Line (JR Kyoto Line)
- Distance: 546.4 km (339.5 mi) from Tokyo
- Platforms: 2 island platforms

Construction
- Structure type: Ground level
- Accessible: Yes

Other information
- Status: Staffed
- Station code: JR-A43
- Website: Official website

History
- Opened: 11 April 1947

Passengers
- FY 2023: 39,978 daily

Services
| Preceding station | JR West | Following station |
|---|---|---|
| Senrioka towards Kyōto | JR Kyōto Line Local | Suita towards Ōsaka |
Location
- Location within Osaka Prefecture Location within Kansai region Location within Japan

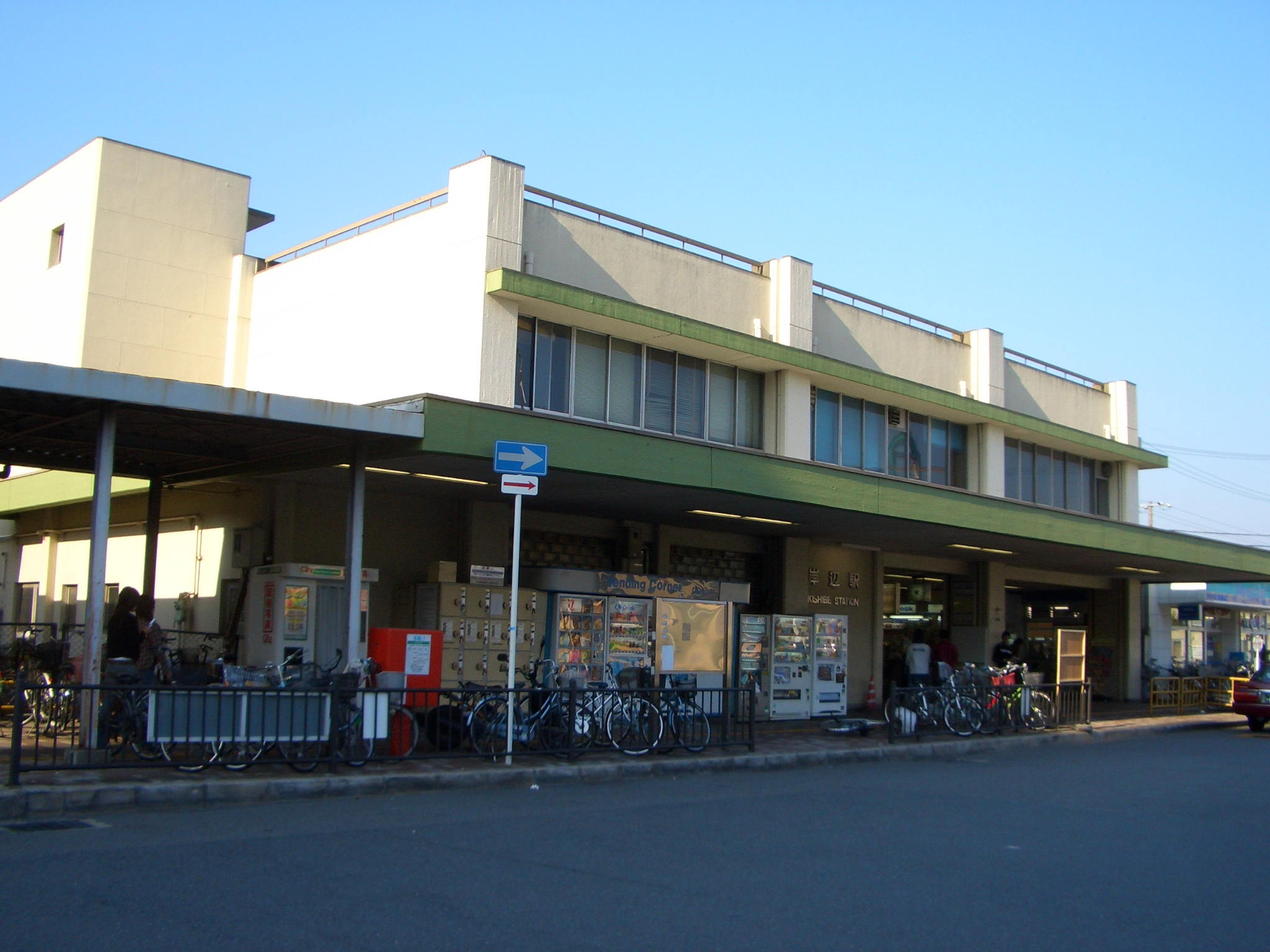
Old building (2005)

Kishibe Station (岸辺駅, Kishibe-eki) is a passenger railway station located in the city of Suita, Osaka Prefecture, Japan. It is operated by the West Japan Railway Company (JR West).

== Lines ==
Kishibe Station is served by the JR Kyoto Line (Tōkaidō Main Line), and is 32.8 kilometers from the starting point of the line at Kyoto and 546.4 kilometers from the terminus at Tokyo.

== Start Layout ==
The station has two island platform connected by an elevated station building; however, only the inner tracks on both platforms are in use, and the outer tracks are fenced off and used only for passing traffic. The station is staffed.

=== Platforms ===
| 1 | ■ JR Kyoto Line | Passing trains only |
| 2 | ■ JR Kyoto Line | for Shin-Osaka, Osaka and Sannomiya |
| 3 | ■ JR Kyoto Line | for Takatsuki and Kyoto |
| 4 | ■ JR Kyoto Line | Passing trains only |

== History ==
Kishibe Station opened on 11 April 1947.

Station numbering was introduced to the station in March 2018 with Senrioka being assigned station number JR-A43.

== Passenger statistics ==
In fiscal 2019, the station was used by an average of 18,926 passengers daily (boarding passengers only).

== Surrounding area ==
- Kita-Osaka Health and Medical City
- National Cerebral and Cardiovascular Center
- Suita Municipal Hospital
- JR Freight Suita Locomotive Depot
- JR West Suita Factory
- Osaka Gakuin University

== See also ==
- List of railway stations in Japan
