= JR-Sōjiji Station =

Railway station in Ibaraki, Osaka Prefecture, Japan

JR-Sōjiji Station JR総持寺駅
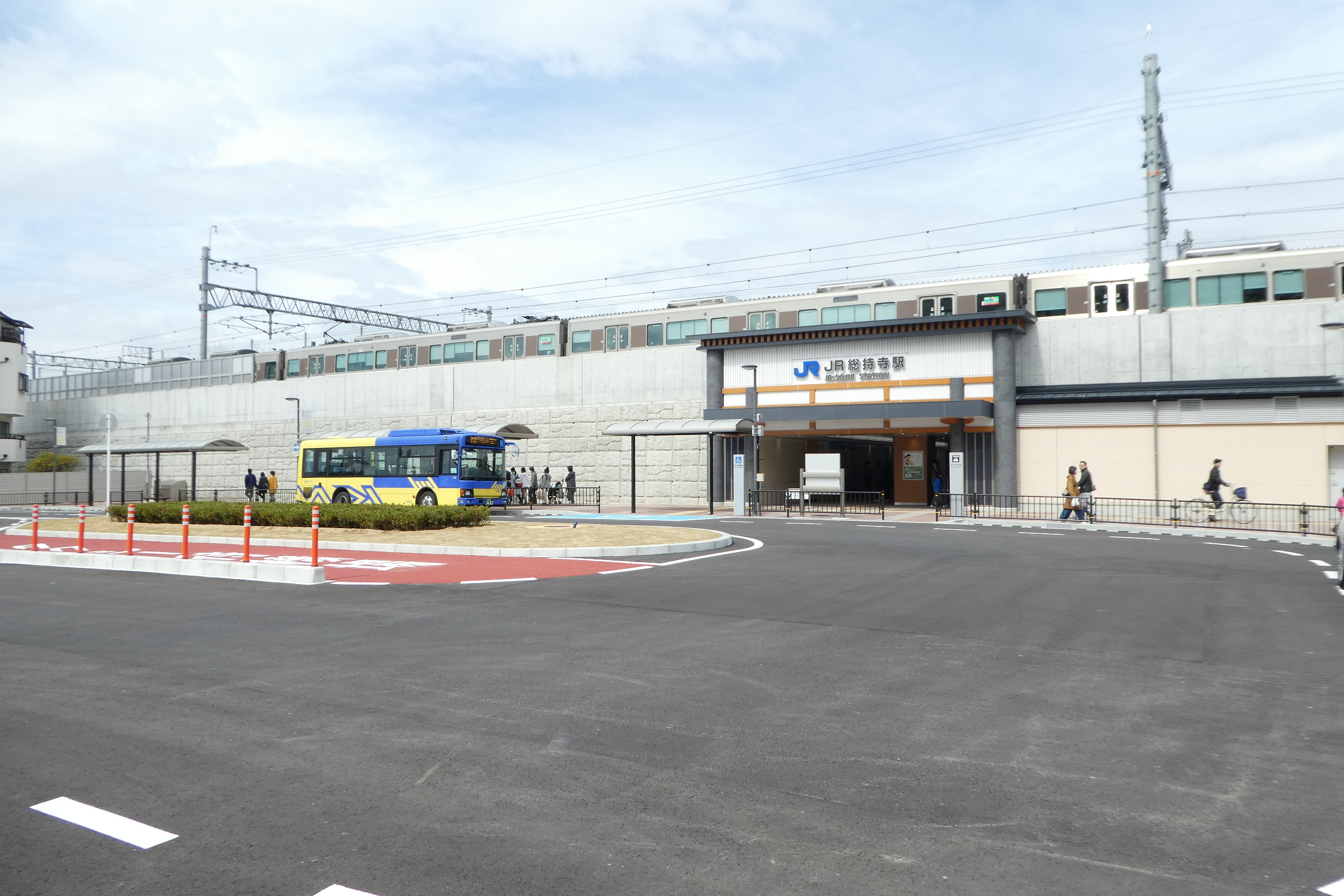
- JR-Sōjiji Station in March 2018

General information
- Location: 1-chōme-18 Nishigawara, Ibaraki-shi, Osaka-fu 567-0023; Japan
- Coordinates: 34.8285°N 135.5776°E
- Operator: JR West
- Line: A JR Kyoto Line
- Distance: 539.8 km (335.4 mi) from Tokyo
- Platforms: 1 island platform
- Tracks: 2

Construction
- Structure type: Elevated
- Accessible: yes

Other information
- Status: Staffed
- Station code: JR-A40
- Website: Official website

History
- Opened: 17 March 2018

Passengers
- FY 2023: 19,450 daily
Location
- Location within Osaka Prefecture Location within Kansai region Location within Central Japan Location within Japan

JR-Sōjiji Station (JR総持寺駅, JR-Sōjiji-eki) is a passenger railway station located in the city of Ibaraki, Osaka Prefecture, Japan. It is operated by the West Japan Railway Company (JR West).

== Lines ==
JR-Sōjiji Station is served by the JR Kyoto Line (Tōkaidō Main Line), and is 26.2 kilometers from the starting point of the line at Kyoto and 539.8 kilometers from the terminus at Tokyo.

== Start Layout ==
The station has one island platform serving four tracks, with the platform serving only the inner tracks, and the outer tracks used for passing traffic. The platform is equipped with platform screen doors. The station is staffed.

=== Platforms ===
1	■ JR Kyoto Line	for Shin-Osaka, Osaka and Sannomiya
2	■ JR Kyoto Line	for Takatsuki and Kyoto

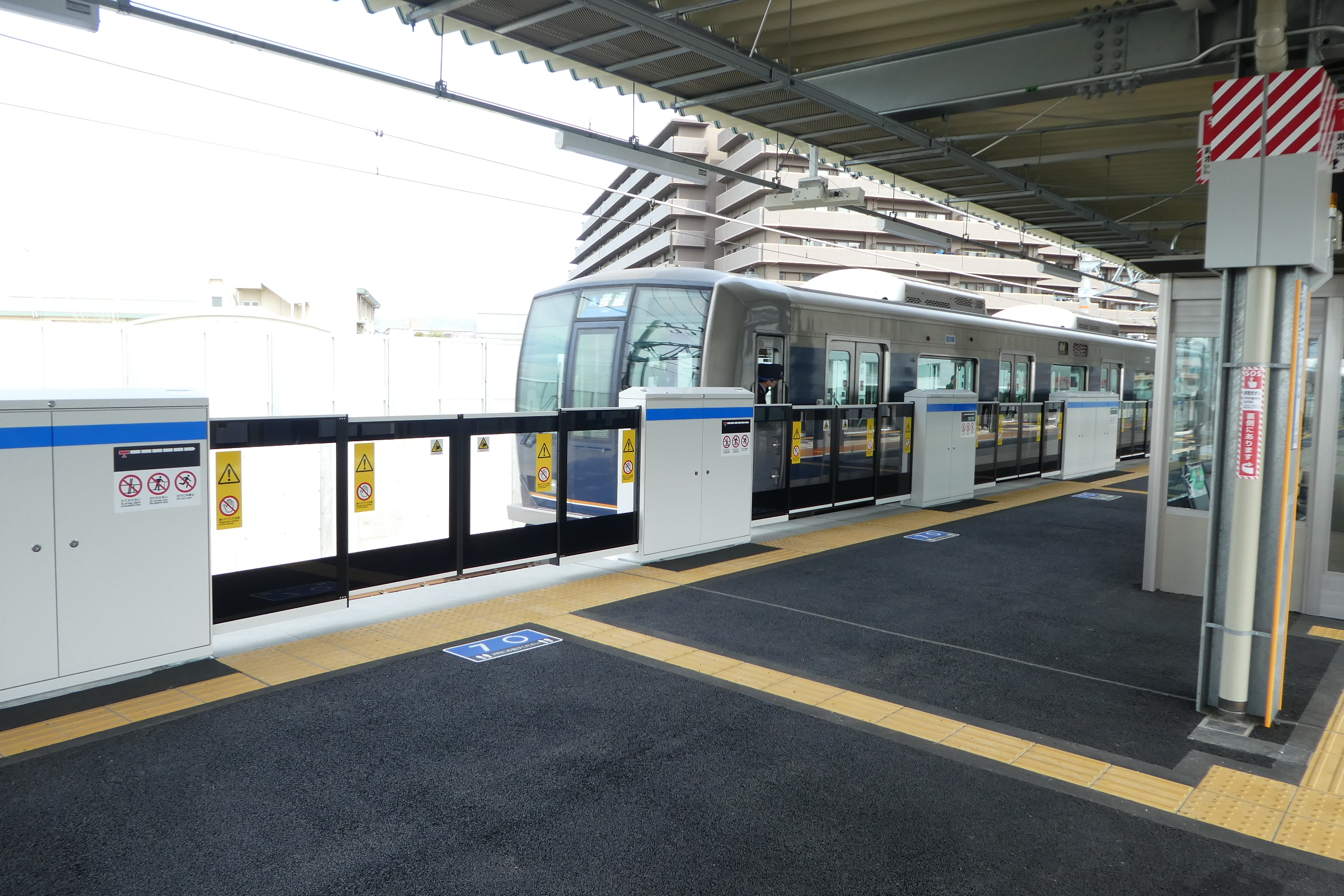
The platform doors in March 2018

== Adjacent stations ==
«	Service	»
Tōkaidō Main Line (JR Kyoto Line)
Limited Express "Hida": Does not stop at this station
Limited Express "Kuroshio": Does not stop at this station
Special Rapid Service: Does not stop at this station
Rapid Service: Does not stop at this station
Settsu-Tonda	Local	Ibaraki

== History ==
An agreement for the construction of a new station between Settsu-Tonda and Ibaraki stations was reached in July 2011. The name of the new station was announced on August 8, 2017. The station opened on March 17, 2018.

== Passenger statistics ==
In fiscal 2019, the station was used by an average of 7,543 passengers daily (boarding passengers only).

== Surrounding area ==
- Sōji-ji Temple
- Osaka Yukuoka Medical College
- Ibaraki City Mishima Junior High School
- Ibaraki City Mishima Elementary School
- Ibaraki Municipal Shoei Elementary School

== See also ==
- List of railway stations in Japan
