= Settsu-Tonda Station =

Railway station in Takatsuki, Osaka Prefecture, Japan

Settsu-Tonda Station 摂津富田駅
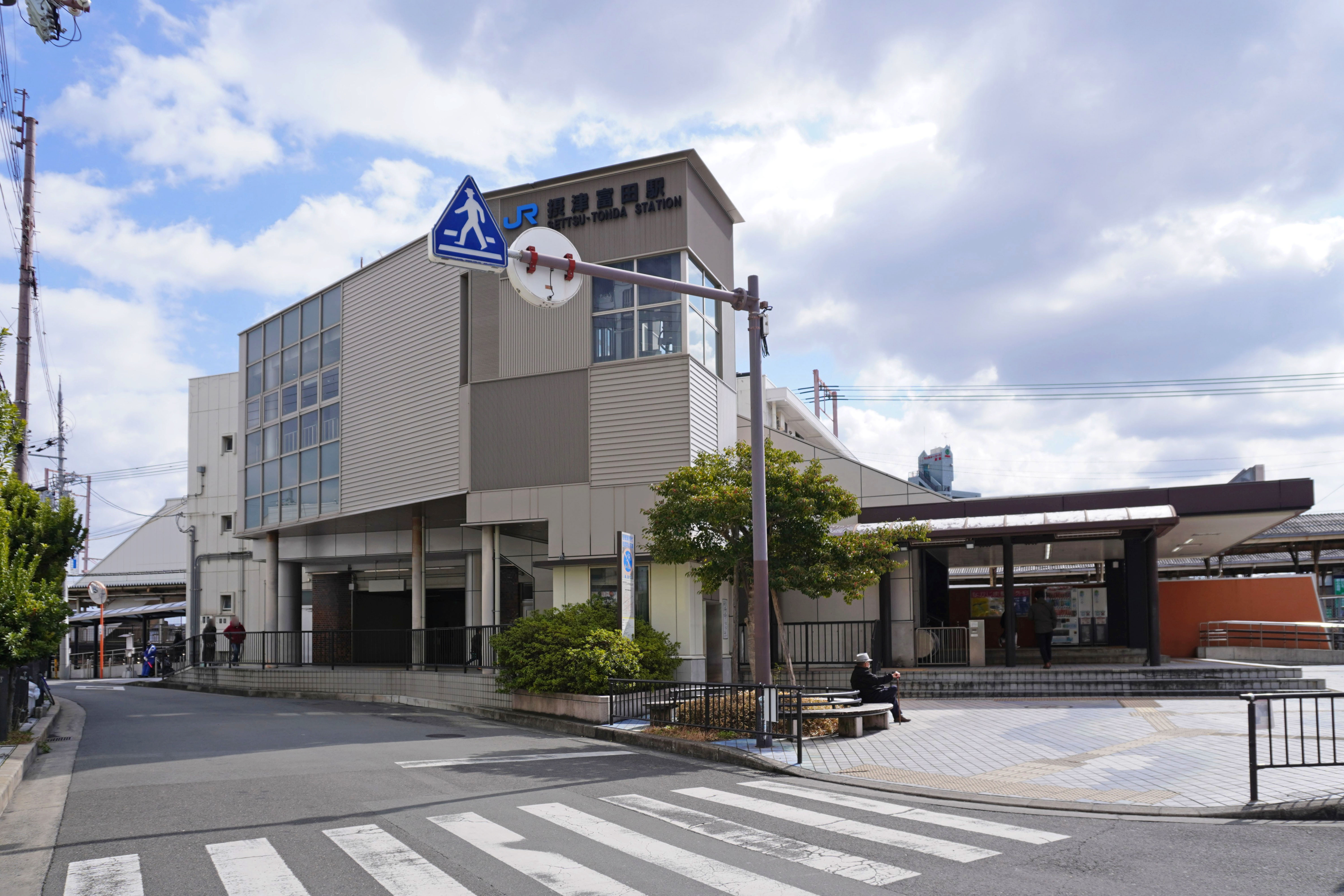
- Settsu-Tonda Station, North Exit, February 2023

General information
- Location: 1-chōme-1 Tondachō, Takatsuki-shi, Osaka-fu 569-0814; Japan
- Coordinates: 34°50′15.62″N 135°35′36.06″E
- Lines: A Tōkaidō Main Line (JR Kyoto Line)
- Distance: 538.1 km (334.4 mi) from Tokyo
- Platforms: 2 island platforms

Construction
- Structure type: Ground level
- Accessible: Yes

Other information
- Status: Staffed (Midori no Madoguchi )
- Station code: JR-A38
- Website: Official website

History
- Opened: 25 July 1924

Passengers
- FY 2023: 36,756 daily
Location
- Location within Osaka Prefecture Location within Kansai region Location within Japan

Settsu-Tonda Station (摂津富田駅, Settsu-Tonda-eki) is a passenger railway station located in the city of Takatsuki, Osaka Prefecture, Japan. It is operated by the West Japan Railway Company (JR West).

== Lines ==
Settsu-Tonda Station is served by the JR Kyoto Line (Tōkaidō Main Line), and is 24.5 kilometers from the starting point of the line at Kyoto and 538.1 kilometers from the terminus at Tokyo.

== Start Layout ==
The station has two island platforms connected by an elevated station building. The outer side of each platform is fenced off as all trains on the outer tracks pass through this station without stopping.

=== Platforms ===
1	■ JR Kyoto Line	Passing trains only
2	■ JR Kyoto Line	for Shin-Osaka, Osaka and Sannomiya
3	■ JR Kyoto Line	for Takatsuki and Kyoto
4	■ JR Kyoto Line	Passing trains only

== Adjacent stations ==
«	Service	»
Tōkaidō Main Line (JR Kyoto Line)
Limited Express "Hida": Does not stop at this station
Limited Express "Kuroshio": Does not stop at this station
Special Rapid Service: Does not stop at this station
Rapid Service: Does not stop at this station
Takatsuki	Local	JR-Sōjiji

== History ==
Settsu-Tonda Station opened on 25 July 1924.

Station numbering was introduced to the station in March 2018 with Settsu-Tonda being assigned station number JR-A39.

== Passenger statistics ==
In fiscal 2019, the station was used by an average of 20,170 passengers daily (boarding passengers only).

== Surrounding area ==
- Takatsuki City Hall Tomita Branch
- Takatsuki Municipal Fourth Junior High School
- Osaka Prefectural Takatsuki Support School
- Takatsuki Municipal Tomita Elementary School

== See also ==
- List of railway stations in Japan
