= Katsuragawa Station (Kyoto) =

Railway and metro station in Kyoto, Japan

Katsuragawa Station 桂川駅
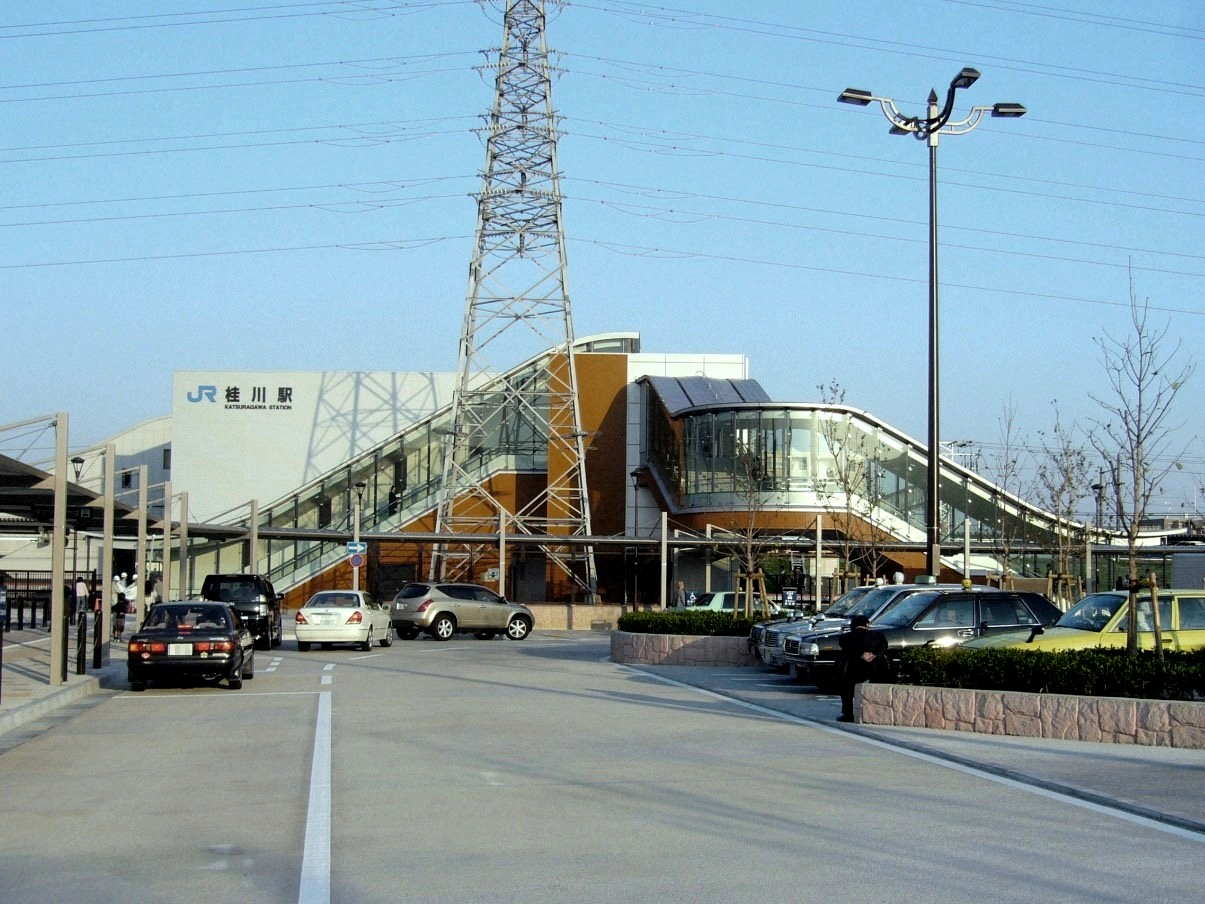
- West side of the station

General information
- Other names: Kuze
- Location: 6-7, Kuze Takadacho, Minami, Kyoto, Kyoto （京都市南区久世高田町6-7） Japan
- Coordinates: 34°57′52.21″N 135°42′37.36″E
- Operator: West Japan Railway Company
- Line: Tōkaidō Main Line (JR Kyoto Line)
- Connections: Bus terminal

Construction
- Structure type: Ground level
- Accessible: Yes

Other information
- Station code: JR-A33

History
- Opened: 2008

Passengers
- FY 2023: 30,380 daily
Location

Katsuragawa Station (桂川駅, Katsuragawa-eki) is a railway station located in Minami-ku, Kyoto, Japan, on the JR Kyoto Line operated by JR West. It opened on October 18, 2008. Katsuragawa is between Nishiōji and Mukōmachi Stations, west of the bridges over the Katsura River (Katsuragawa in Japanese).

The station on a four-track section has a single island platform between center two tracks. It serves trains 12 cars long. An overhead bridge provides access to the platform, as well as unrestricted passage from one side of the station to the other. Facilities include elevators, escalators, and multipurpose toilets.

1	■ JR Kyoto Line	for Shin-Osaka, Osaka and Sannomiya
2	■ JR Kyoto Line	for Kyoto and Kusatsu

The station serves the nearby Japan Ground Self-Defense Force base at Katsura. Passengers can access Rakusaiguchi Station on the Hankyū Kyoto Main Line, about 600 m distant.

== History ==
Katsuragawa Station opened on 15 March 2008.

Station numbering was introduced to the station in March 2018 with Katsuragawa being assigned station number JR-A33.

If built, the planned final extension of the Hokuriku Shinkansen from Tsuruga to Osaka is expected to have a new underground station connected to Katsuragawa station.

== Adjacent stations ==
«	Service	»
JR Kyoto Line
Nishiōji	Local (Including rapid service after the morning)	Mukōmachi
Rapid Service (in the morning): Does not stop at this station
Special Rapid Service: Does not stop at this station
Limited Express "Hida": Does not stop at this station
Limited Express "Kuroshio": Does not stop at this station
Kansai Airport Limited Express "Haruka": Does not stop at this station

== Surroundings ==
Aeon Mall Kyoto Katsuragawa, an Aeon Group shopping mall with 214,000-square-meter floor space is located next to the station and connected to the station with a walk bridge.
