= Senrioka Station =

Railway station in Settsu, Osaka Prefecture, Japan

Coordinates: 34.7917°N 135.5515°E

Senrioka Station 千里丘駅
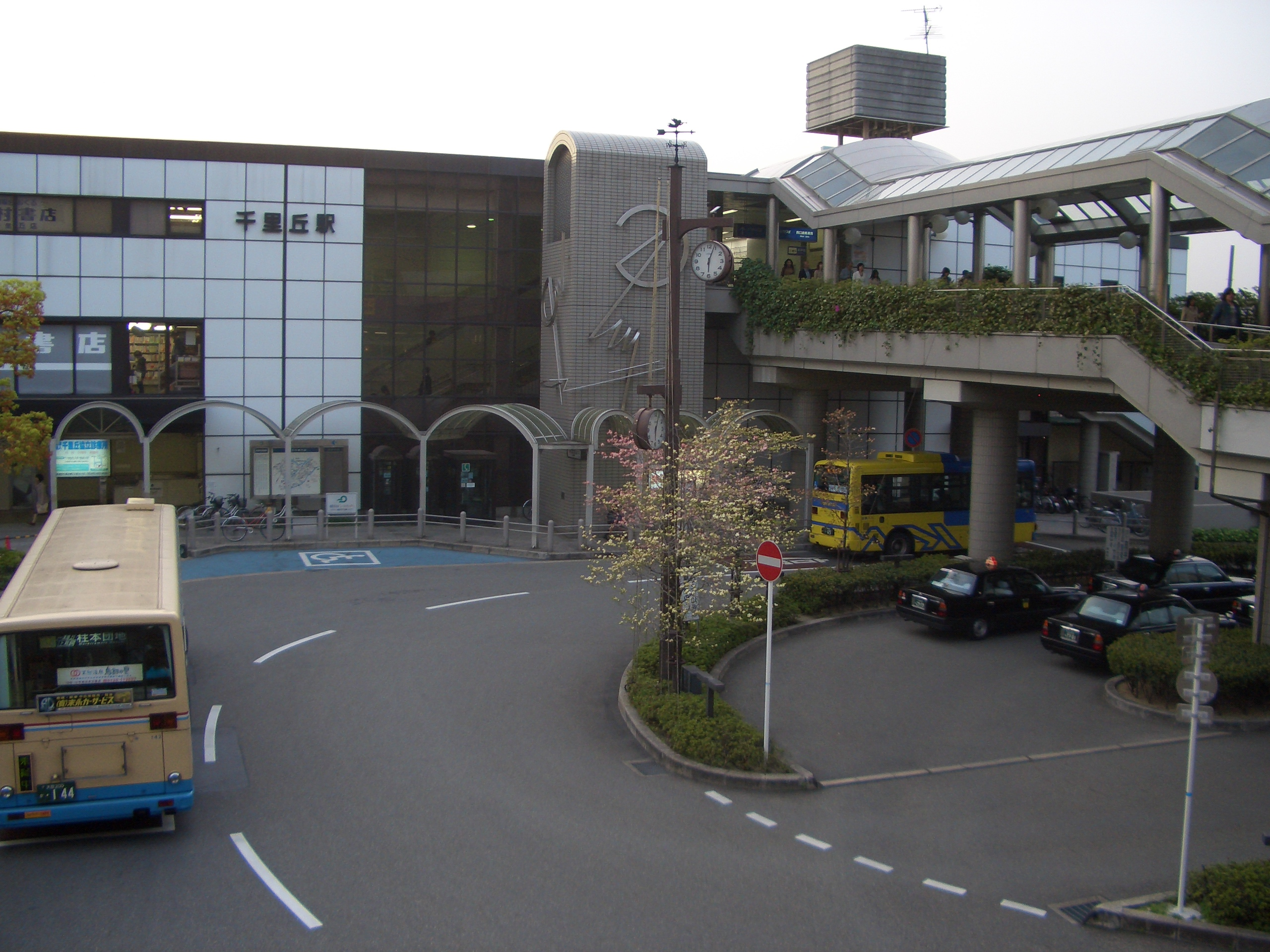

General information
- Location: Settsu, Osaka; Japan
- Operator: JR West
- Lines: Tōkaidō Main Line; (JR Kyoto Line)

Construction
- Structure type: Elevated
- Accessible: Yes

Other information
- Station code: JR-A42

History
- Opened: 1 December 1938

Passengers
- FY 2023: 38,768 daily

Services
Preceding station	JR West	Following station
Ibaraki towards Kyōto	JR Kyōto Line Local	Kishibe towards Ōsaka
Location

Senrioka Station (千里丘駅, Senrioka-eki) is a railway station in Settsu, Osaka Prefecture, Japan.

== Lines ==
- West Japan Railway Company
  - JR Kyoto Line (Tōkaidō Main Line)

== History ==
The station opened on 1 December 1938.

Station numbering was introduced to the station in March 2018 with Senrioka being assigned station number JR-A42.

== Layout ==
The station has two island platforms, each of which exclusively serves up or down trains. The outer side of each platform is fenced as all trains on the outer tracks pass through this station without stopping.
