= Ibaraki Station =

Railway station in Ibaraki, Osaka Prefecture, Japan

Ibaraki Station 茨木駅
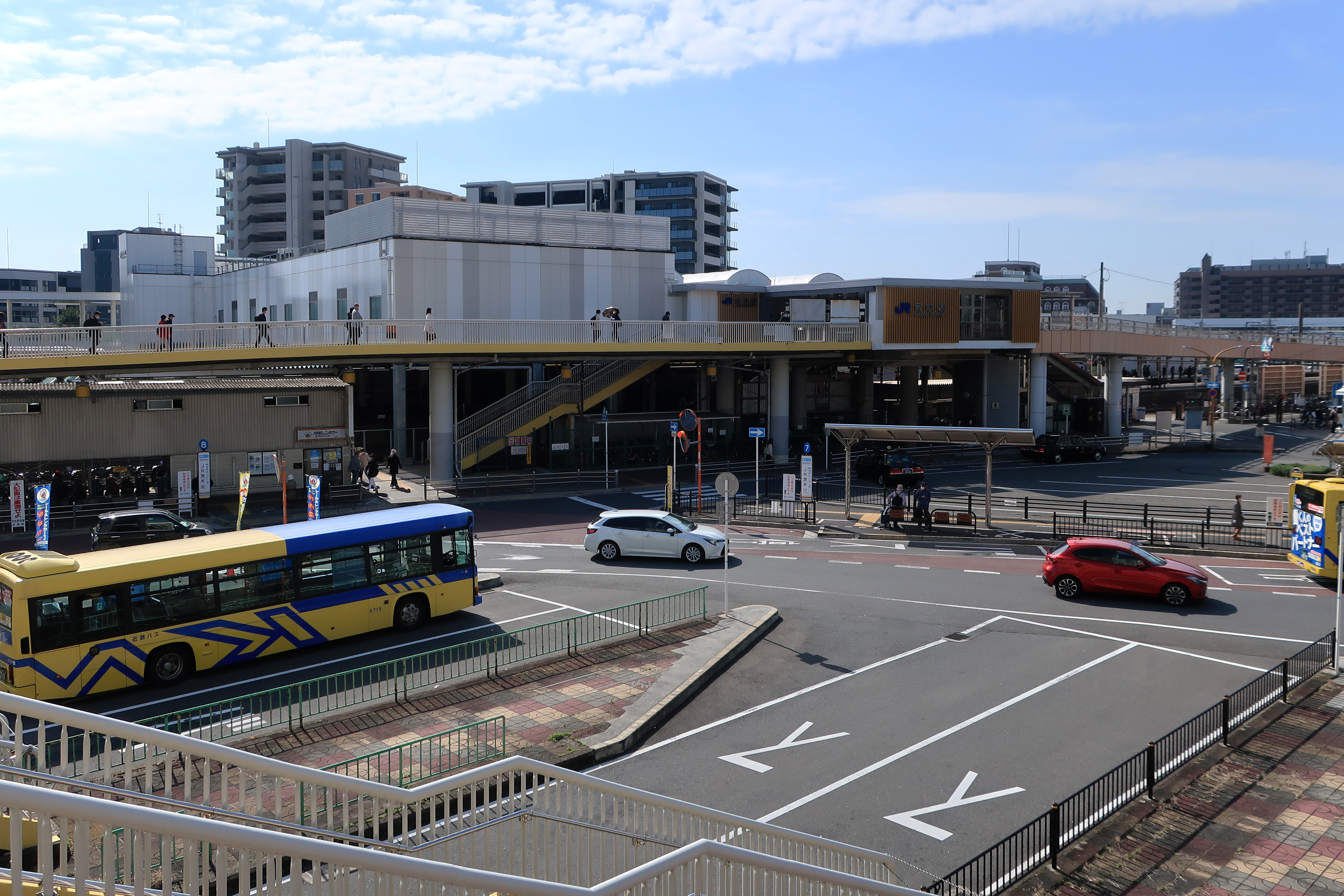
- Ibaraki Station West Entrance

General information
- Location: 1-chōme-1 Ekimae, Ibaraki-shi, Osaka-fu 567-0888; Japan
- Coordinates: 34°48′55″N 135°33′44″E
- Operator: JR West
- Line: A JR Kyoto Line
- Distance: 541.8 km (336.7 mi) from Tokyo
- Platforms: 2 island platforms
- Tracks: 4

Construction
- Structure type: Elevated
- Accessible: yes

Other information
- Status: Staffed (Midori no Madoguchi)
- Station code: JR-A41
- Website: Official website

History
- Opened: 9 August 1876

Passengers
- FY 2023: 86,856 daily
Location
- Location within Osaka Prefecture Location within Kansai region Location within Central Japan Location within Japan

East Entrance

Ticket Gate

Ibaraki Station (茨木駅, Ibaraki-eki) is a passenger railway station located in the city of Ibaraki, Osaka Prefecture, Japan. It is operated by the West Japan Railway Company (JR West).

== Lines ==
Ibaraki Station is served by the JR Kyōto Line (Tōkaidō Main Line), and is 28.2 kilometers from the starting point of the line at Kyoto and 541.8 kilometers from the terminus at Tokyo.

== Start Layout ==
The station has two island platforms serving four tracks, connected by an elevated station building. The station has a Midori no Madoguchi staffed ticket office.

=== Platforms ===
| 1 | ■ JR Kyoto Line | part of rapid services for Shin-Osaka, Osaka and Sannomiya in the morning |
| 2 | ■ JR Kyoto Line | for Shin-Osaka, Osaka and Sannomiya |
| 3 | ■ JR Kyoto Line | for Takatsuki and Kyoto |
| 4 | ■ JR Kyoto Line | part of rapid services for Takatsuki and Kyoto on weekday mornings |

== Adjacent stations ==
| « | Service | » |
Tōkaidō Main Line passenger tracks (JR Kyoto Line)
| JR-Sōjiji | Local | Senrioka |
| Takatsuki | Rapid Service | Shin-Ōsaka |
Special Rapid Service: Does not stop at this station
Limited Express "Thunderbird": Does not stop at this station
Limited Express "Super Hakuto": Does not stop at this station
Limited Express "Hida": Does not stop at this station
Limited Express "Kuroshio": Does not stop at this station
Kansai Airport Limited Express "Haruka": Does not stop at this station
Tōkaidō Main Line freight tracks (no passenger trains stop, route for limited express trains "Haruka")
| Terminus | - | Suita Signal Box |

== History ==
Ibaraki Station opened on 9 August 1876.

Station numbering was introduced to the station in March 2018 with Ibaraki being assigned station number JR-A41.

== Passenger statistics ==
In fiscal 2019, the station was used by an average of 48,243 passengers daily (boarding passengers only).

== Surrounding area ==
- Ibaraki City Kasugaoka Elementary School
- Ibaraki Municipal Hozumi Elementary School
- Ritsumeikan University Osaka Ibaraki Campus (Building B and Iwakura Park)
- Ibaraki City Hall
- Ibaraki Municipal Yosei Junior High School
- Ibaraki Shrinel

== See also ==
- List of railway stations in Japan
- Ibaraki-shi Station (another major station in Ibaraki on the Hankyu Kyoto Main Line)
