= Suita Station (JR West) =

Railway station in Suita, Osaka Prefecture, Japan

Suita Station 吹田駅
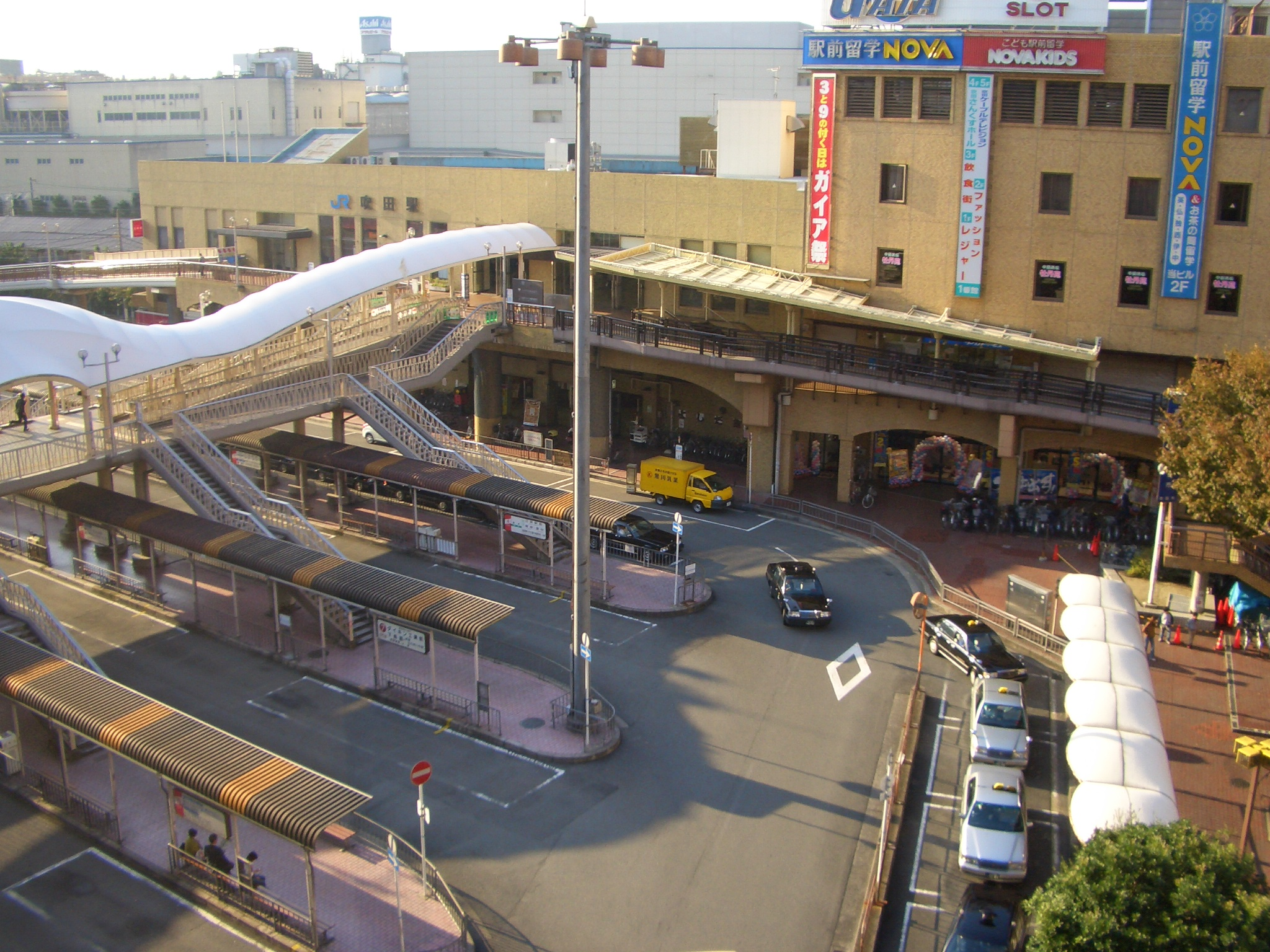
- Station building and bus stops

General information
- Location: 1 Asahimachi, Suita-shi, Osaka-fu 564-0027; Japan
- Coordinates: 34°45′47.43″N 135°31′25.21″E
- Operator: JR West; JR Freight
- Lines: A Tōkaidō Main Line (JR Kyoto Line)
- Distance: 548.8 km (341.0 mi) from Tokyo
- Platforms: 2 island platforms

Construction
- Structure type: Ground level
- Accessible: Yes

Other information
- Status: Staffed
- Station code: JR-A44
- Website: Official website

History
- Opened: 9 August 1876

Passengers
- FY 2023: 44,262 daily

Services
Preceding station	JR West	Following station
Kishibe towards Kyōto	JR Kyōto Line Local	Higashi-Yodogawa towards Ōsaka
Location
- Location within Osaka Prefecture Location within Kansai region Location within Japan

Suita Station (吹田駅, Suita-eki) is a passenger railway station located in the city of Suita, Osaka Prefecture, Japan. It is operated by the West Japan Railway Company (JR West). It is also the location of a freight depot operated by the Japan Freight Railway Company (JR Freight).

== Lines ==
Suita Station is served by the JR Kyoto Line (Tōkaidō Main Line), and is 35.2 kilometers from the starting point of the line at Kyoto and 548.8 kilometers from the terminus at Tokyo.

== Start Layout ==
The station has two island platform connected by an elevated station building; however, only the inner tracks on both platforms are in use, as the outer tracks are fenced off and used only for passing trains. The station is staffed.

=== Platforms ===
1	■ JR Kyoto Line	Passing trains only
2	■ JR Kyoto Line	for Shin-Osaka, Osaka and Sannomiya
3	■ JR Kyoto Line	for Takatsuki and Kyoto
4	■ JR Kyoto Line	Passing trains only

== Adjacent stations ==
«	Service	»
JR West
Tōkaidō Line passenger tracks (JR Kyōto Line)
Kishibe	Local	Higashi-Yodogawa
Rapid Service: Does not stop at this station
Special Rapid Service: Does not stop at this station
Limited Express "Hida": Does not stop at this station
Limited Express "Kuroshio": Does not stop at this station
Tōkaidō Line freight tracks
Suita Signal Box	Umeda Freight Line (no passenger trains stop) (route for limited express trains "Haruka")	Shin-Ōsaka
Suita Signal Box	Hoppo Freight Line (freight only)	Miyahara Depot
Katamachi Line freight branch
Terminus	Joto Freight Line	Shigino

== History ==
The station opened on 9 August 1876.

Station numbering was introduced to the station in March 2018 with Suita being assigned station number JR-A44.

== Passenger statistics ==
In fiscal 2019, the station was used by an average of 22,896 passengers daily (boarding passengers only).

== Surrounding area ==
- Kita-Osaka Health and Medical City
- National Cerebral and Cardiovascular Center
- Suita Municipal Hospital
- JR Freight Suita Locomotive Depot
- JR West Suita Factory
- Osaka Gakuin University

== See also ==
- List of railway stations in Japan
