= JR Kyōto Line =

Railway line in Keihanshin, Japan

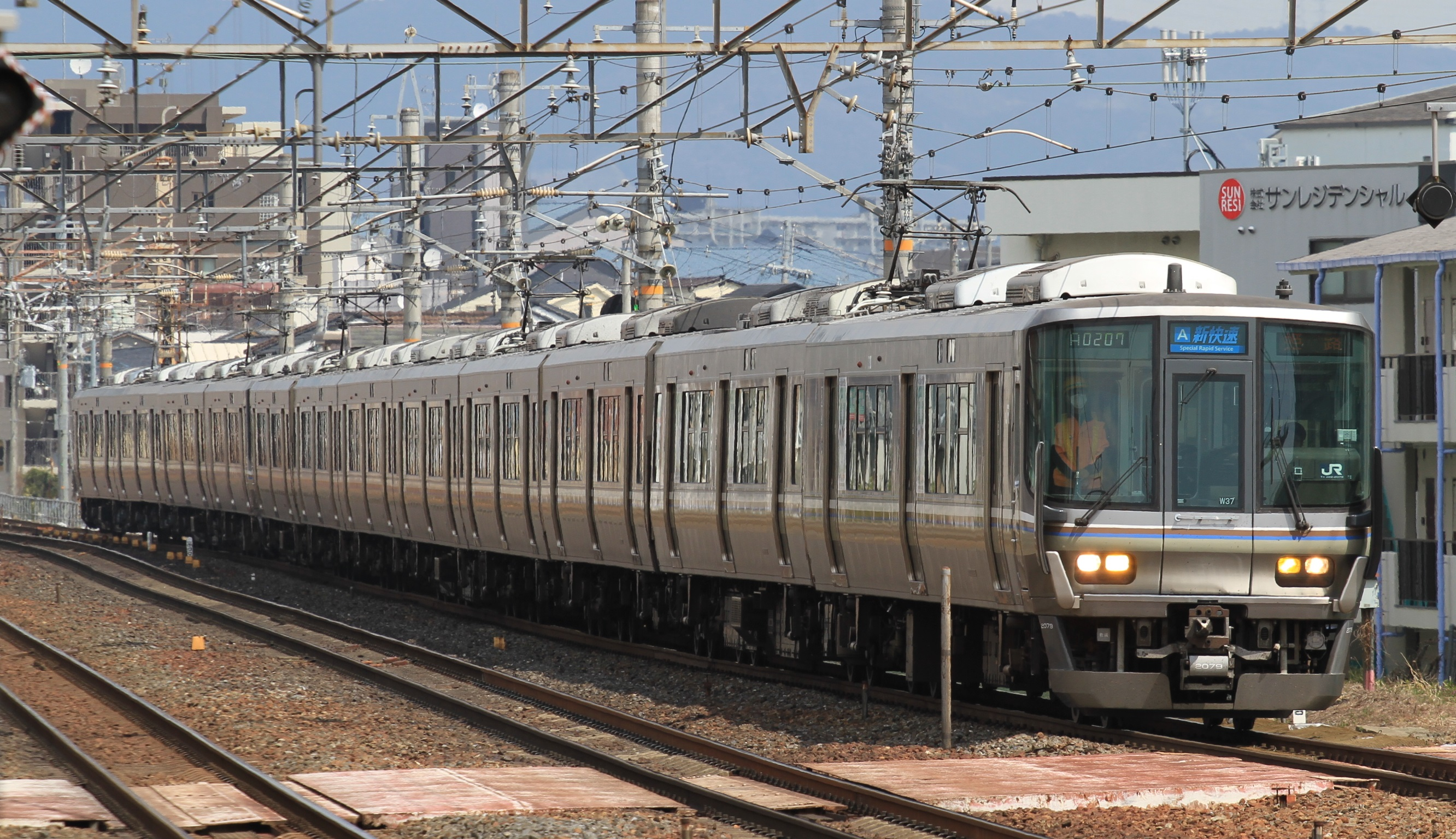
- 223-2000 series EMU on a Special Rapid Service

Overview
- Native name: JR京都線
- Owner: JR West
- Locale: Kyoto Prefecture and Osaka Prefecture
- Termini: Kyoto (Tōkaidō Line); Osaka (Tōkaidō Line)
- Stations: 17

Service
- Type: Heavy rail
- System: Urban Network
- Operator(s): JR West; JR Freight

History
- Opened: July 26, 1876; 149 years ago

Technical
- Line length: 42.8 km (26.6 mi)
- Track gauge: 1,067 mm (3 ft 6 in)
- Electrification: 1,500 V DC (overhead lines)
- Operating speed: outer tracks: 130 km/h (81 mph) inner tracks: 120 km/h (75 mph)

The JR Kyōto Line (JR京都線, JR Kyōto-sen) is a commuter rail line in the Osaka-Kobe-Kyoto Metropolitan Area owned and operated by West Japan Railway Company (JR West). The name applies to the section of the Tōkaidō Main Line between Kyōto Station and Ōsaka Station.

The Kyōto Line operates in combination with the Biwako Line and the JR Kobe Line, and offers through service trains to the Kosei Line and the JR Takarazuka Line.

== Basic data ==
- Operators, distances: 42.8 km / 26.6 mi.
  - West Japan Railway Company (Category-1, services and tracks)
  - Japan Freight Railway Company (Category-2, services)
- Track: Entire line quadruple-tracked
- Railway signalling: Automatic
- Maximum speed:
  - outer tracks: 130 km/h
  - inner tracks: 120 km/h
- CTC centers: Ōsaka Operation Control Center
- CTC system: JR Kyoto-Kobe traffic control system (ja:運行管理システム(JR西日本))

== Services ==
Commuter trains are classified in three types:

- Special Rapid Service (新快速, Shin-Kaisoku)
  - Continuing service from the Biwako Line and the Kosei Line. Trains stop at Kyōto, Takatsuki, Shin-Ōsaka, and Ōsaka. Trains continue from Ōsaka on the JR Kōbe Line to Himeji and beyond. 223 series and 225 series EMUs are used. Daytime trains depart every 15 minutes and take 28 minutes from Kyōto to Ōsaka and vice versa.
- Rapid Service (快速, Kaisoku)
  - Continuing service from the Biwako Line and the Kosei Line. Trains stop at Kyōto, Nagaokakyō, Takatsuki, Ibaraki, Shin-Ōsaka, and Ōsaka. After the morning, trains also stop at all other stations between Kyōto and Takatsuki and occasionally called local trains on this section. Trains continue from Osaka on the JR Kōbe Line to Himeji and beyond. 225 series, 223 series, 221 series EMUs are used.
- Local (普通, Futsū)
  - Service from Kyōto to Nishi-Akashi on the JR Kōbe Line, and from Takatsuki to Shin-Sanda on the JR Takarazuka Line. Trains stop at all stations. 321 series EMUs and 207 series EMUs are used.

In addition to the three types of commuter trains, long-distance limited express trains connecting the Kyoto-Osaka region with Kansai International Airport (Haruka services), Hokuriku region (Thunderbird services) and other areas also frequently operate on the line. Freight trains also operate on the line except for the section near Osaka Station where freight trains use separate freight lines.

== Stations ==
Legend:

- ● : All trains stop
- | : All trains pass
- ▲ : Trains only after morning rush stop

Local trains stop at all stations. Rapid trains in the morning skip some stops between Kyoto and Takatsuki.

Official Line Name	No.	Station	Japanese	Distance (km)	Stops		Transfers	Location	
Official Line Name	No.	Station	Japanese	Distance (km)	Rapid	Special Rapid	Transfers	Ward, City	Prefecture
Through services from Biwako Line and Kosei Line
Tōkaidō Main Line	JR-A31	Kyōto	京都	0.0	●	●	Tōkaidō Shinkansen; A Biwako Line; B Kosei Line ( B31 ); D Nara Line ( D01 ); E Sagano Line ( E01 ); B Kintetsu Kyoto Line (B01); Karasuma Line (K11)	Shimogyō-ku, Kyoto	Kyoto
Tōkaidō Main Line	JR-A32	Nishiōji	西大路	2.5	▲	|		Minami-ku, Kyoto	Kyoto
Tōkaidō Main Line	JR-A33	Katsuragawa	桂川 (久世)	5.3	▲	|		Minami-ku, Kyoto	Kyoto
Tōkaidō Main Line	JR-A34	Mukōmachi	向日町	6.4	▲	|		Mukō	Kyoto
Tōkaidō Main Line	JR-A35	Nagaokakyō	長岡京	10.1	●	|		Nagaokakyō	Kyoto
Tōkaidō Main Line	JR-A36	Yamazaki	山崎	14.1	▲	|		Ōyamazaki	Kyoto
Tōkaidō Main Line	JR-A37	Shimamoto	島本	16.3	▲	|		Shimamoto	Osaka
Tōkaidō Main Line	JR-A38	Takatsuki	高槻	21.6	●	●		Takatsuki	Osaka
Tōkaidō Main Line	JR-A39	Settsu-Tonda	摂津富田	24.5	|	|		Takatsuki	Osaka
Tōkaidō Main Line	JR-A40	JR-Sōjiji	JR総持寺	26.2	|	|		Ibaraki	Osaka
Tōkaidō Main Line	JR-A41	Ibaraki	茨木	28.2	●	|		Ibaraki	Osaka
Tōkaidō Main Line	JR-A42	Senrioka	千里丘	31.1	|	|		Settsu	Osaka
Tōkaidō Main Line	JR-A43	Kishibe	岸辺	32.8	|	|		Suita	Osaka
Tōkaidō Main Line	JR-A44	Suita	吹田	35.2	|	|		Suita	Osaka
Tōkaidō Main Line	JR-A45	Higashi-Yodogawa	東淀川	38.3	|	|		Yodogawa-ku, Osaka	Osaka
Tōkaidō Main Line	JR-A46	Shin-Ōsaka	新大阪	39.0	●	●	Tōkaidō Shinkansen; JR West; F Osaka Higashi Line ( F02 ); Midōsuji Line ( M 13 )	Yodogawa-ku, Osaka	Osaka
Tōkaidō Main Line	JR-A47	Ōsaka	大阪	42.8	●	●	JR Kōbe Line; G JR Takarazuka Line ( G47 ); O Osaka Loop Line ( O11 ); F Osaka Higashi Line ( F01 ); H JR Tōzai Line ( H44 : Kitashinchi); Hankyū Kōbe Main Line, Hankyu Takarazuka Main Line, Hankyu Kyoto Main Line (HK-01:Osaka-umeda Station); Hanshin Main Line (HS 01:Osaka-Umeda Station); Osaka Metro: Midōsuji Line (M16: Umeda Station); Tanimachi Line (T20: Higashi-Umeda); Yotsubashi Line (Y11: Nishi-Umeda)	Kita-ku, Osaka	Osaka
Through services on JR Kobe Line Through services on JR Takarazuka Line (Local only)

=== Closed station ===
From September 5, 1876 to the opening of Kyoto Station on February 6, 1877, Ōmiyadōri Temporary Station (大宮通仮停車場, Ōmiyadōri Kari Teishajō) was the station for the city of Kyoto. The temporary station was located at 40 chains (0.80 km) west of Kyoto Station construction site, or 3 miles and 47 chains (5.77 km) away from Mukōmachi Station.

== Rolling stock ==
=== Local ===
- 207 series (from 1991, through service with Fukuchiyama Line)
- 321 series (from 2005, through service with Fukuchiyama Line)

=== Special Rapid and Rapid ===
- 221 series (from 1989, through service with Kosei and Biwako Lines, until 2023)
- 223-1000/2000/6000 series (from 1995, through service with Kosei and Biwako Lines)
- 225-0/100 series (from 2010, through service with Kosei and Biwako Lines)

=== Limited express ===
- 271 series (Haruka service, from Spring 2020)
- 281 series (Haruka service, from 1994)
- 283 series (Kuroshio service, from 1997)
- 285 series (Sunrise Izumo/Sunrise Seto service, from July 1998)
- 287 series (Kuroshio service, from 2012)
- 289 series (Kuroshio service, from October 2015)
- 681 series (Thunderbird and Biwako Express service, from 1992)
- 683 series (Thunderbird and Biwako Express service, from 2001)
- KiHa 189 series (Biwako Express service, from March 2014)
- KiHa 85 series (JR Central) (Hida service)
- HOT7000 series (Chizu Express) (Super Hakuto service, from 1994, through service with Chizu Line)

=== Former ===
- 103 series (until August 1, 2005)
- 113 series (until October 16, 2004)
- 117 series (from 1980 until May 10, 1999)
- 201 series (from 1983 until 2007)
- 205-0 series (from 1986 until 2006, from 2011 until March 2013)
- 381 series (Limited Express Kuroshio service, until October 2015)
- 485 series (Limited Express Raichō until March 2011)
- 583 series (Express Kitaguni until January 2013)
- KiHa 181 series (Limited Express Hakuto from 1994 until 1997)
- 383 series (JR Central) (Limited Express Shinano until 26 March 2016)

== History ==
The line now called the JR Kyōto Line opened in 1876, only four years after the opening of the first railway in Japan. On 26 July 1876, the Japanese Government Railways opened the section between Ōsaka and Mukōmachi with an intermediate station at Takatsuki. On 9 August 1876, Yamazaki Station, Ibaraki Station and Suita Station opened. Kyoto Station opened on 6 February 1877.

On 1 June 1949, operation of the line was taken over by Japanese National Railways (JNR).

- 1 October 1964 – Shin-Ōsaka Station opens with a Tōkaidō Shinkansen connection
- 1 October 1970 – Operation of Special Rapid Service starts
- 1 April 1987 – JR West becomes the operator of the line following privatization of JNR
- 13 March 1988 – JR West starts the use of the line name JR Kyōto Line
