= Takatsuki Station (Osaka) =

Railway station in Takatsuki, Osaka Prefecture, Japan

Takatsuki Station 高槻駅
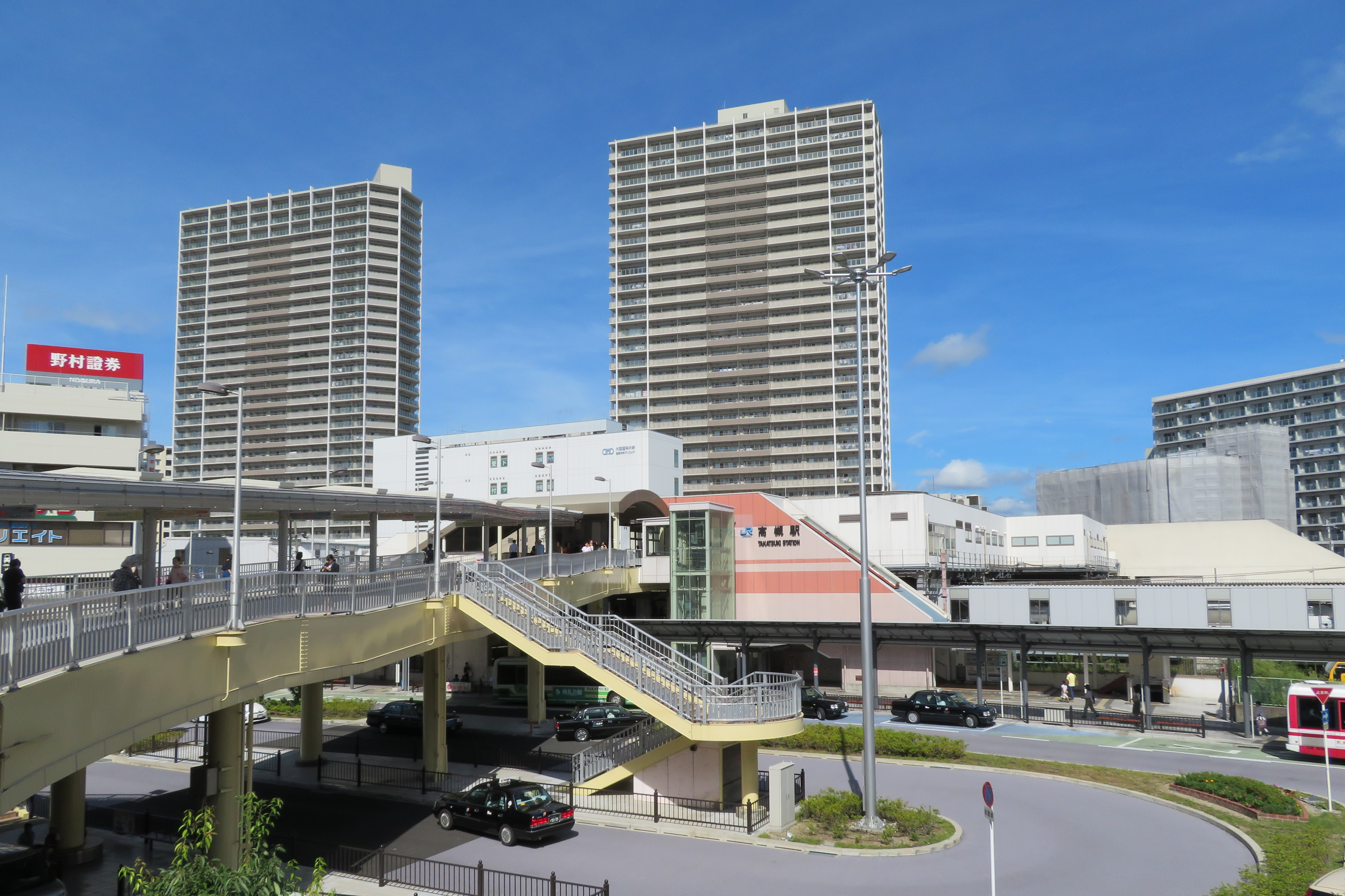
- Takatsuki Station building (south side)

General information
- Location: 1-1, Hakubaicho, Takatsuki-shi, Osaka-fu; Japan
- Coordinates: 34°51′06″N 135°37′04″E
- Operator: JR West
- Lines: A Tōkaidō Main Line (JR Kyoto Line)
- Distance: 535.7 km (332.9 mi) from Tokyo
- Platforms: 2 island platforms
- Connections: Bus terminal

Construction
- Structure type: Ground level
- Accessible: Yes

Other information
- Status: Staffed (Midori no Madoguchi )
- Station code: JR-A38
- Website: Official website

History
- Opened: 26 July 1876

Passengers
- FY 2023: 114,970 daily
Location
- Location within Osaka Prefecture Location within Kansai region Location within Japan

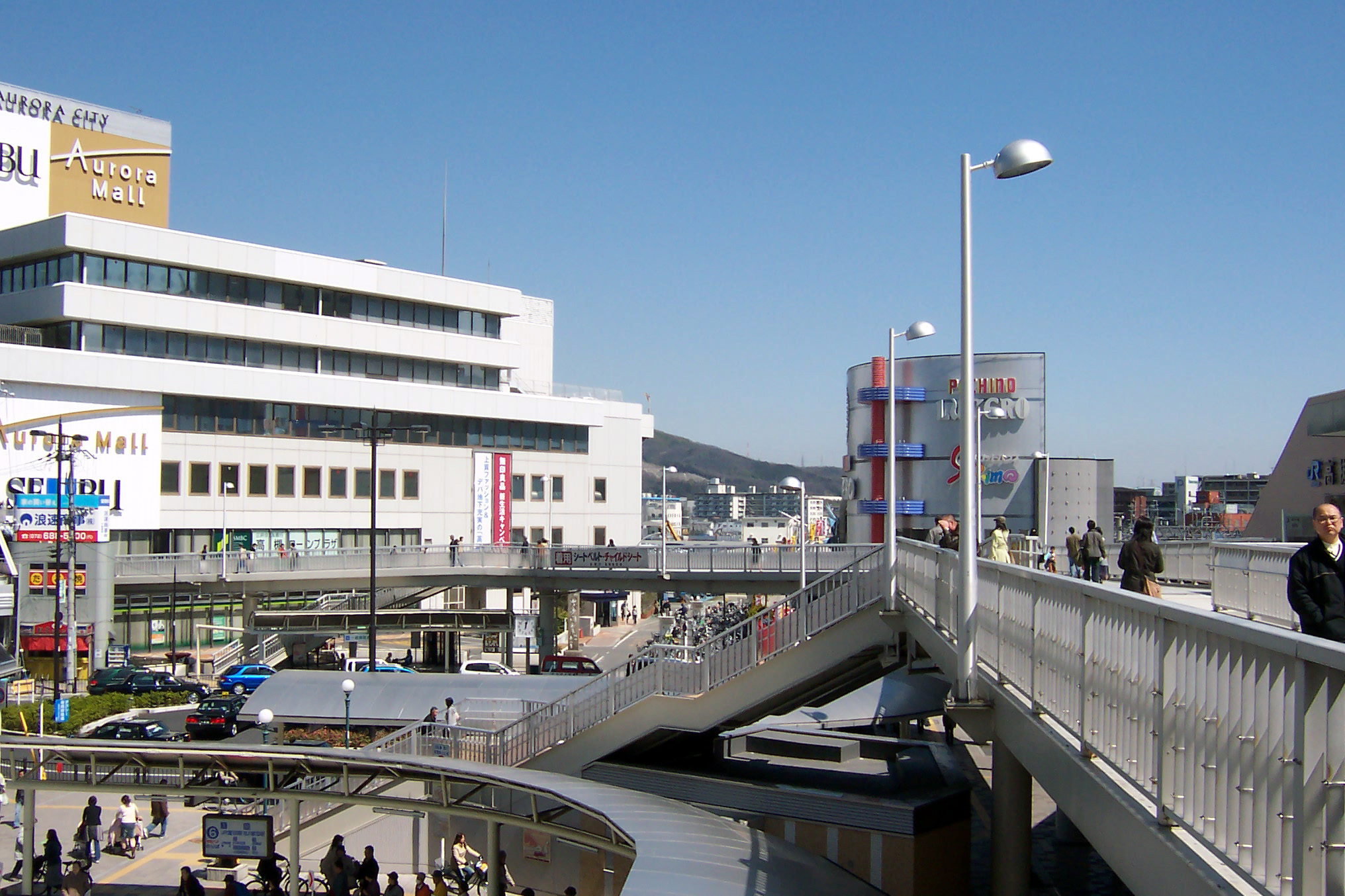
View from the deck seen on the picture above

Takatsuki Station (高槻駅, Takatsuki-eki) is a passenger railway station located in the Hakubaicho neighborhood of the city of Takatsuki, Osaka Prefecture, Japan. It is operated by the West Japan Railway Company (JR West).

== Lines ==
Takatsuki Station is served by the JR Kyoto Line (Tōkaidō Main Line) and is 21.6 kilometers to the starting point of the line at Kyoto Station and 535.7 kilometers to the terminus at Tokyo Station. Takatsuki Station is one of the transportation hubs in the city of Takatsuki. All trains of the regional service of the JR Kyoto Line, i.e., Special Rapid Service, Rapid Service and local trains, stop at the station. Express and limited express trains, such as Super Hakuto and Kuroshio, do not make a stop at Takatsuki.

Some Special Rapid Service trains that stop at this station also stop at another Takatsuki Station in Takatsuki, Shiga Prefecture.

== Station layout ==
Takatsuki Station has two island platforms that enable passengers to transfer between local and rapid trains. It has separate tracks for passing trains as well. Stairs, escalators and elevators connect the two platforms to the upper level concourse. The station provides automated and Midori no Madoguchi staffed ticket office services for passengers including seat reservation.

=== Platforms ===
1	■ JR Kyoto Line	limited express "Haruka" "Thunderbird" and special rapid services for Kyoto and Kusatsu
2	■ JR Kyoto Line	rapid services for Kyoto and Kusatsu
3	■ JR Kyoto Line	local trains for Kyoto
4	■ JR Kyoto Line	local trains for Shin-Osaka, Osaka, Sannomiya and Takarazuka
5	■ JR Kyoto Line	rapid services for Shin-Osaka, Osaka and Sannomiya
6	■ JR Kyoto Line	limited express "Thunderbird" and special rapid services for Shin-Osaka, Osaka and Sannomiya
6	■ Kansai Airport Line	limited express "Haruka" for Kansai Airport

By the bus terminals attached thereto, the station is connected with many locations in Takatsuki, as well as Hirakatashi Station on the Keihan Main Line in Hirakata, Osaka, across the Yodo River.

== Adjacent stations ==
«	Service	»
Tōkaidō Main Line (JR Kyoto Line)
Limited Express "Hida": Does not stop at this station
Limited Express "Kuroshio": Does not stop at this station
Kyōto (JR-A31)	Limited Express Thunderbird; Kansai Airport Limited Express Haruka (Some trains only)	Shin-Ōsaka (JR-A46)
Kyōto (JR-A31)	Special Rapid Service	Shin-Ōsaka (JR-A46)
Nagaokakyō (JR-A35)	Rapid Service (in the morning)	Ibaraki (JR-A41)
Shimamoto (JR-A37) (as local trains)	Rapid Service (after the morning)	Ibaraki (JR-A41)
Shimamoto (JR-A37)	Local	Settsu-Tonda (JR-A39)

== History ==
Takatsuki Station opened when the railway between Osaka and Kyoto started provisional operation between Osaka Station and Mukōmachi Station on 28 July 1876. Since the railway was first built with single track, the location of Takatsuki Station in the middle of Osaka and Kyoto was suitable for trains of both directions to cross each other.

Station numbering was introduced to the station in March 2018 with Takatsuki being assigned station number JR-A38.

== Passenger statistics ==
In fiscal 2019, the station was used by an average of 64,879 passengers daily (boarding passengers only).

== Surrounding area ==
There is an extensive shopping district between Takatsuki Station and Takatsuki-shi Station (Hankyu Kyoto Line). There are also department stores, Seibu and Matsuzakaya, around the station.

== See also ==
- List of railway stations in Japan
