= Shin-Ōsaka Station =

Railway and metro station in Osaka, Japan

Shin-Ōsaka Station 新大阪駅
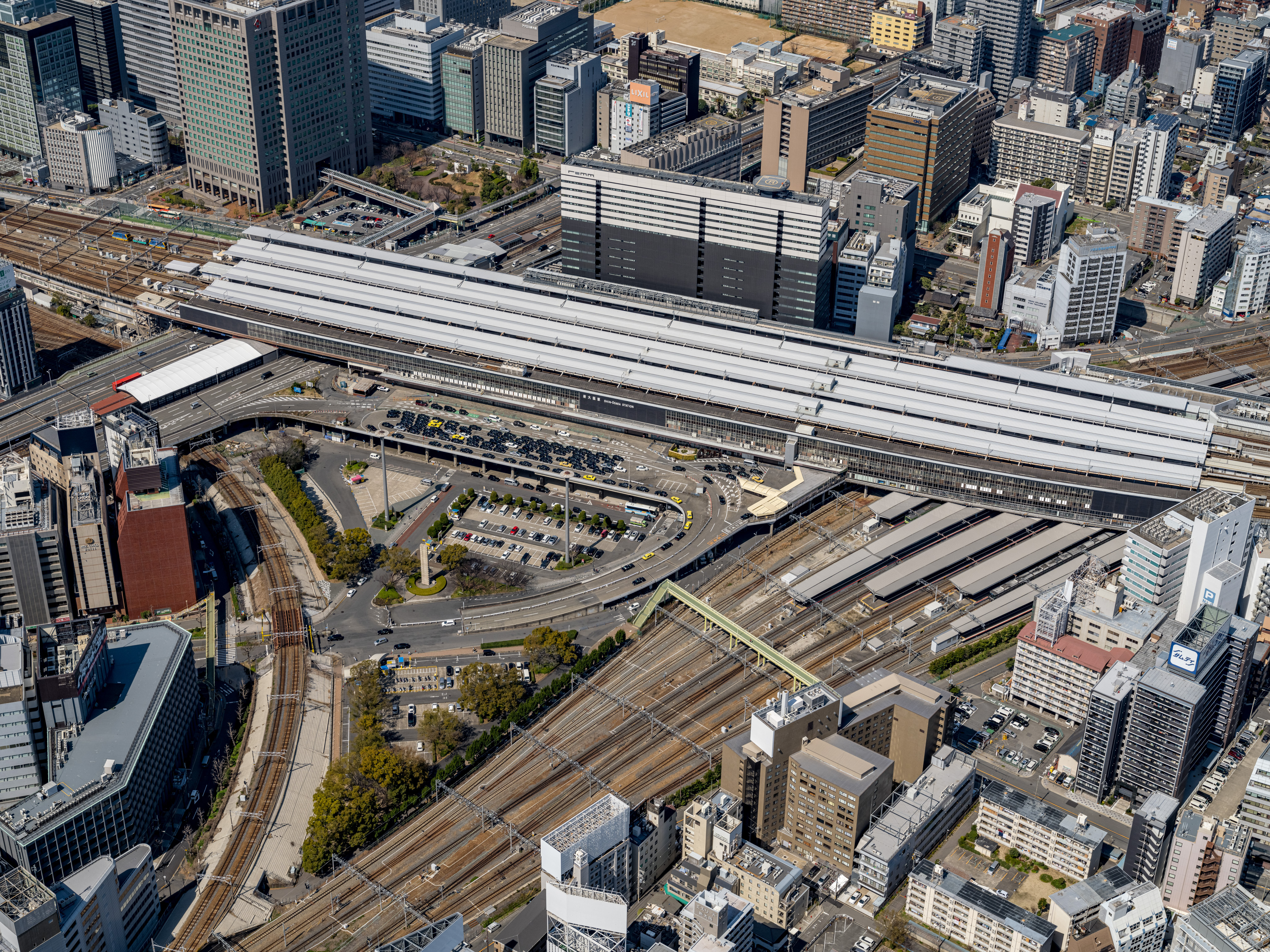
- Aerial photo of Shin-Osaka station

General information
- Location: 5 Nishinakajima; Yodogawa, Osaka; Japan
- Operator: JR West; JR Central; Osaka Metro
Location
- Location within Osaka Prefecture Location within Japan

Shin-Ōsaka Station (Japanese: 新大阪駅, Hepburn: Shin-Ōsaka-eki; lit. 'New Osaka Station') is a major interchange railway station in Yodogawa-ku, Osaka, Japan. It is the western terminus of the high-speed Tōkaidō Shinkansen from Tokyo, the eastern terminus of the San'yō Shinkansen from Fukuoka, and one of the primary rail hubs in Osaka. The two Shinkansen lines are physically connected, allowing many services to operate through between them.

The station opened in 1964 and was built about 3 kilometres (1.9 mi) from the older Ōsaka Station to avoid the engineering challenges of extending the Shinkansen line into the city center. The JR Kyoto Line and the Midōsuji Line subway offer convenient connections to other major destinations throughout central Osaka.

== Lines ==
- JR West
  - JR Kyoto Line (Tōkaidō Main Line)
  - San'yō Shinkansen
  - Osaka Higashi Line
- JR Central
  - Tōkaidō Shinkansen
- Osaka Municipal Subway
  - Midōsuji Line (M13)

== JR ==
A 46 F 02 Shin-Osaka Station 新大阪駅
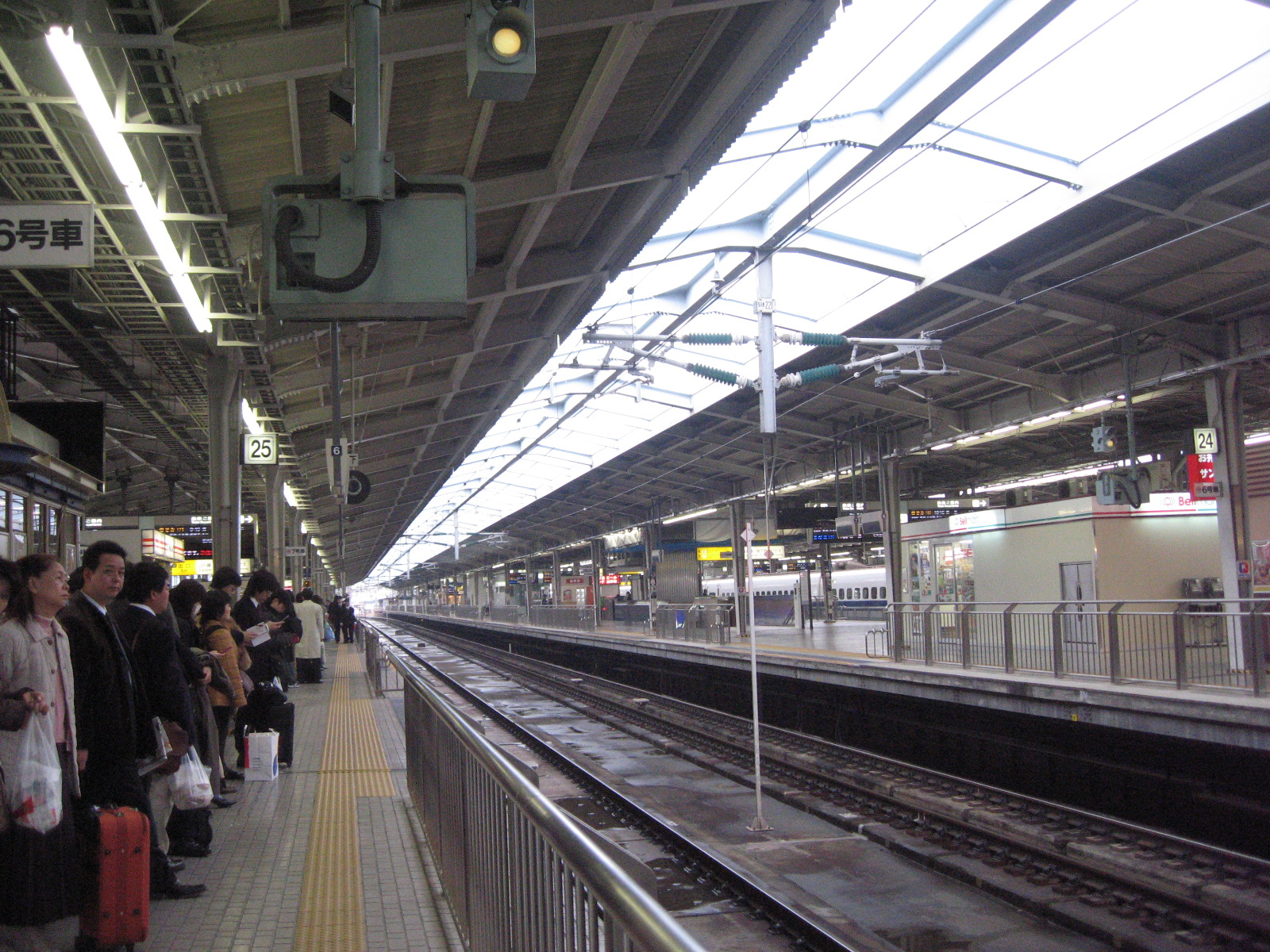
- Shinkansen tracks

General information
- Location: 5-16-1 Nishinakajima; Yodogawa, Osaka; Japan
- Coordinates: 34°44′0.54″N 135°30′0.41″E
- Operator: JR West (Conventional lines and San'yō Shinkansen); JR Central (Tōkaidō Shinkansen)
- Lines: Tōkaidō Shinkansen; San'yō Shinkansen; Tōkaidō Main Line (JR Kyoto Line); Tōkaidō Line Branch (Umeda Freight Line)
- Platforms: 5 (Shinkansen); 5 (Conventional Rail)
- Tracks: 8 (Shinkansen); 10 (Conventional Rail)

Construction
- Accessible: Yes

Other information
- Station code: JR-A46 (JR Kyoto Line); JR-F02 (Osaka Higashi Line)

History
- Opened: 1 October 1964; 61 years ago

Passengers
- FY 2023: 137,990 daily (JR West); 158,539 daily (JR Central)

Services
Preceding station	JR Central	Following station
through to San'yō Shinkansen	Tōkaidō Shinkansen Nozomi Hikari Kodama	Kyōto towards Tokyo
Preceding station	JR West	Following station
Shin-Kobe towards Hakata	San'yō Shinkansen Nozomi; Hikari	through to Tōkaidō Shinkansen
Shin-Kobe towards Hakata	San'yō Shinkansen Mizuho; Sakura	Terminus
Shin-Kobe towards Hakata or Hakataminami	San'yō Shinkansen Kodama	through to Tōkaidō Shinkansen
Location

=== Station layout ===
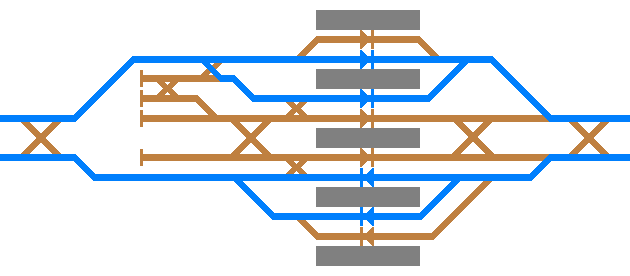
Shinkansen platform layout with track 20 at the bottom and 27 at the top. Hakata is to the left and Tokyo to the right. Through trains operate on the tracks in blue; terminating trains use the tracks in orange.

The conventional rail station has five island platforms serving ten tracks for JR West Lines at ground level.

The Shinkansen station has two side platforms and three island platforms serving eight tracks on the fourth level, above the JR West Lines.

The conventional rail station was built with space east of former Track 10 for an additional platform serving Tracks 9 and 10. The platforms and services were subsequently shifted eastward one platform at a time, with each vacated platform renovated before the next shift. The westernmost platform was converted for services on the Osaka Higashi Line, with the work commencing by 16 March 2019. An additional eastbound Shinkansen platform, Track 27, opened on the northern side of the station on 16 March 2013. The northern area had originally been reserved for a planned connection to Awaji Station and Jūsō Station by Hankyu Railway, but the plans were later cancelled.

1	■ Haruka	towards Kyoto, Kusatsu, and Maibara
1	■ Kuroshio	towards Kyoto
2	■ Limited express trains	termination platform
2	■ Osaka Higashi Line	towards Hanaten and Kyūhōji
3	■ Haruka	towards Kansai Airport
3	■ Kuroshio	towards Shirahama, Kii-Katsuura and Shingu
4	■ Hida	towards Takayama
4	■ Thunderbird	towards Tsuruga
5, 6	■ JR Kyoto Line	towards Suita, Takatsuki, and Kyoto
7, 8	■ JR Kobe Line	towards Osaka, Amagasaki, Ashiya and Sannomiya
7, 8	■ JR Takarazuka Line (through to the Fukuchiyama Line)	towards Takarazuka and Shin-Sanda
9, 10	■ Kounotori	towards Fukuchiyama and Kinosaki Onsen via the Fukuchiyama Line
9, 10	■ Super Hakuto	towards Chizu and Tottori via the Chizu Express Chizu Line
9, 10	■ Limited express trains	towards Osaka
20, 21, 22	■ San'yō Shinkansen	Nozomi, Mizuho, Hikari, Sakura and Kodama towards Hakata
23, 24, 25, 26, 27	■ Tōkaidō Shinkansen	Nozomi, Hikari and Kodama towards Tokyo

=== Limited express trains ===
for the Hokuriku Main Line

- Thunderbird: Osaka - Tsuruga

for the Tōkaidō Line, and the Takayama Line

- Hida: Osaka - Takayama, Toyama
- Rakuraku Biwako: Osaka - Maibara

for the Hanwa Line, the Kansai Airport Line, and the Kinokuni Line

- Haruka: Maibara, Kyoto - Kansai Airport
- Kuroshio: Kyoto, Shin-Osaka - Shirahama, Shingu

for the Fukuchiyama Line

- Kounotori: Shin-Osaka - Fukuchiyama, Toyooka, Kinosaki Onsen

for the Sanin region via the Chizu Express Chizu Line

- Super Hakuto: Kyoto - Tottori, Kurayoshi

=== Adjacent stations ===
«	Service	»
Tōkaidō Main Line (JR Kyoto Line)
Kyoto (JR-A31)	Limited Express Super Hakuto; Limited Express Hida; Rakuraku Biwako	Osaka (JR-A47)
Kyoto (JR-A31)	West Express Ginga	Osaka (JR-A47) or (JR-O11)
Kyoto (JR-A31); Takatsuki (JR-A38)	Limited Express Thunderbird	Osaka (JR-A47)
Terminus	Limited Express Kounotori	Osaka (JR-A47)
Kyoto (JR-A31); Takatsuki (JR-A38) (some trains only)	Kansai Airport Limited Express Haruka	Osaka (JR-O11)
Kyoto (JR-A31)	Limited Express Kuroshio	Osaka (JR-O11)
Takatsuki (JR-A38)	Special Rapid Service	Osaka (JR-A47)
Ibaraki (JR-A41)	Rapid Service	Osaka (JR-A47)
Higashi-Yodogawa (JR-A45)	Local	Osaka (JR-A47)
Osaka Higashi Line
Osaka (JR-F01)	Direct Rapid Service	JR-Awaji (JR-F04)
Osaka (JR-F01)	Local	Minami-Suita (JR-F03)

== Osaka Metro ==
Shin-Osaka Station 新大阪駅
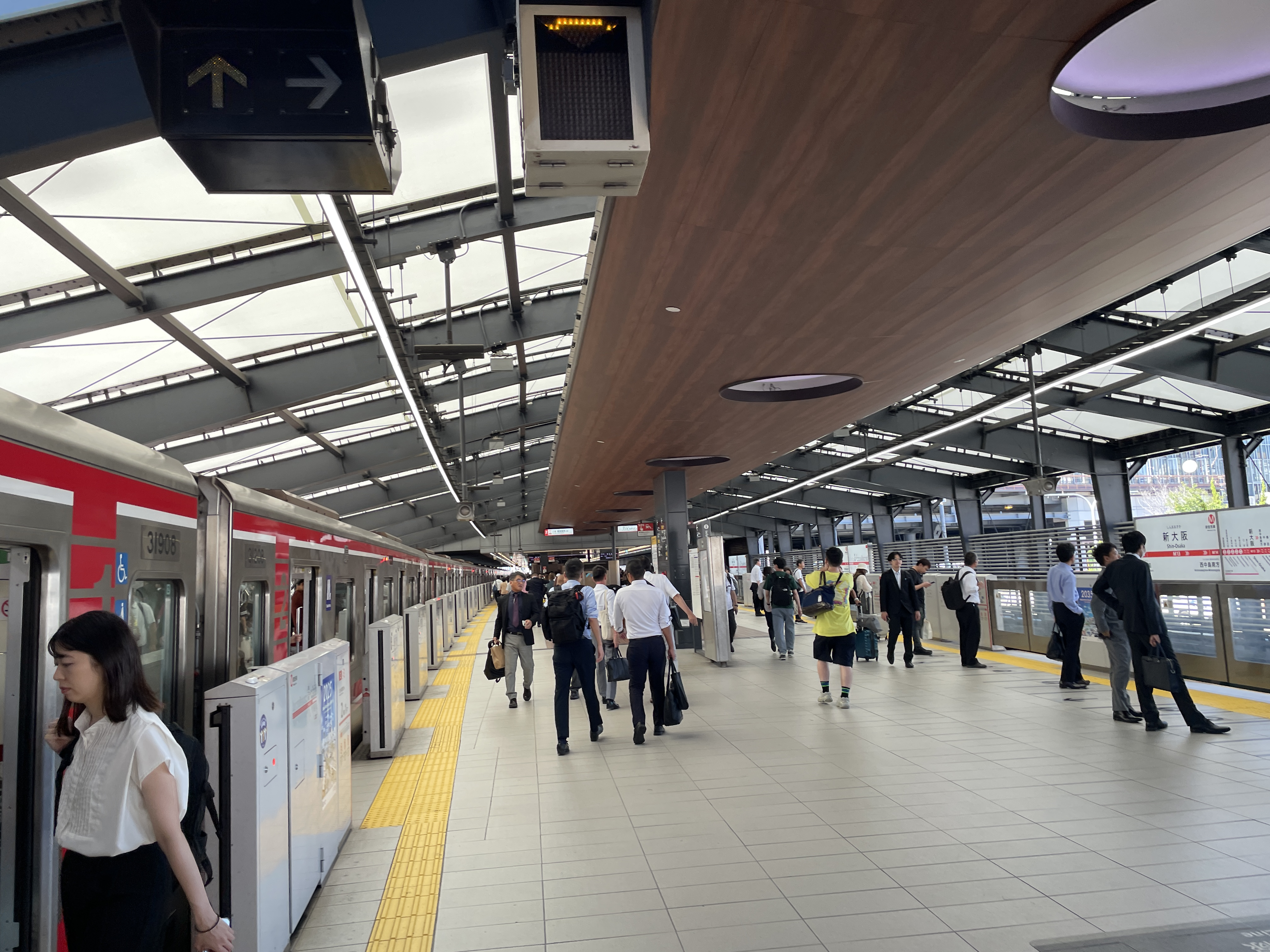
- Midōsuji Line station platform

General information
- Location: 5-15-5 Nishinakajima; Yodogawa, Osaka; Japan
- Coordinates: 34°44′01″N 135°29′55″E
- System: Osaka Metro
- Platforms: 1 island platform
- Tracks: 2

Construction
- Structure type: Elevated

Other information
- Station code: M 13

History
- Opened: 24 September 1964; 61 years ago

Passengers
- FY 2023: 139,897 daily

Services
Preceding station	Osaka Metro	Following station
Higashi-Mikuni M 12 towards Esaka	Midōsuji Line	Nishinakajima-Minamigata M 14 towards Nakamozu
Location

=== Station layout ===
This station has one island platform with two tracks on the third level, located to the west of the platforms and tracks for the Shinkansen.

3F; Platform level	Platform 1	Midōsuji Line towards Nakamozu (Nishinakajima-Minamigata) →
3F; Platform level	Island platform, doors will open on the right
3F; Platform level	Platform 2	← Midōsuji Line toward Minoh-kayano (Higashi-Mikuni)
2F	Mezzanine	Fare gates, ticketing, station agent, restrooms Passageways to JR and Shinkansen platforms
G	Street level	Exit/Entrance

In 2020, a viewing space was added on the north side of the platforms.

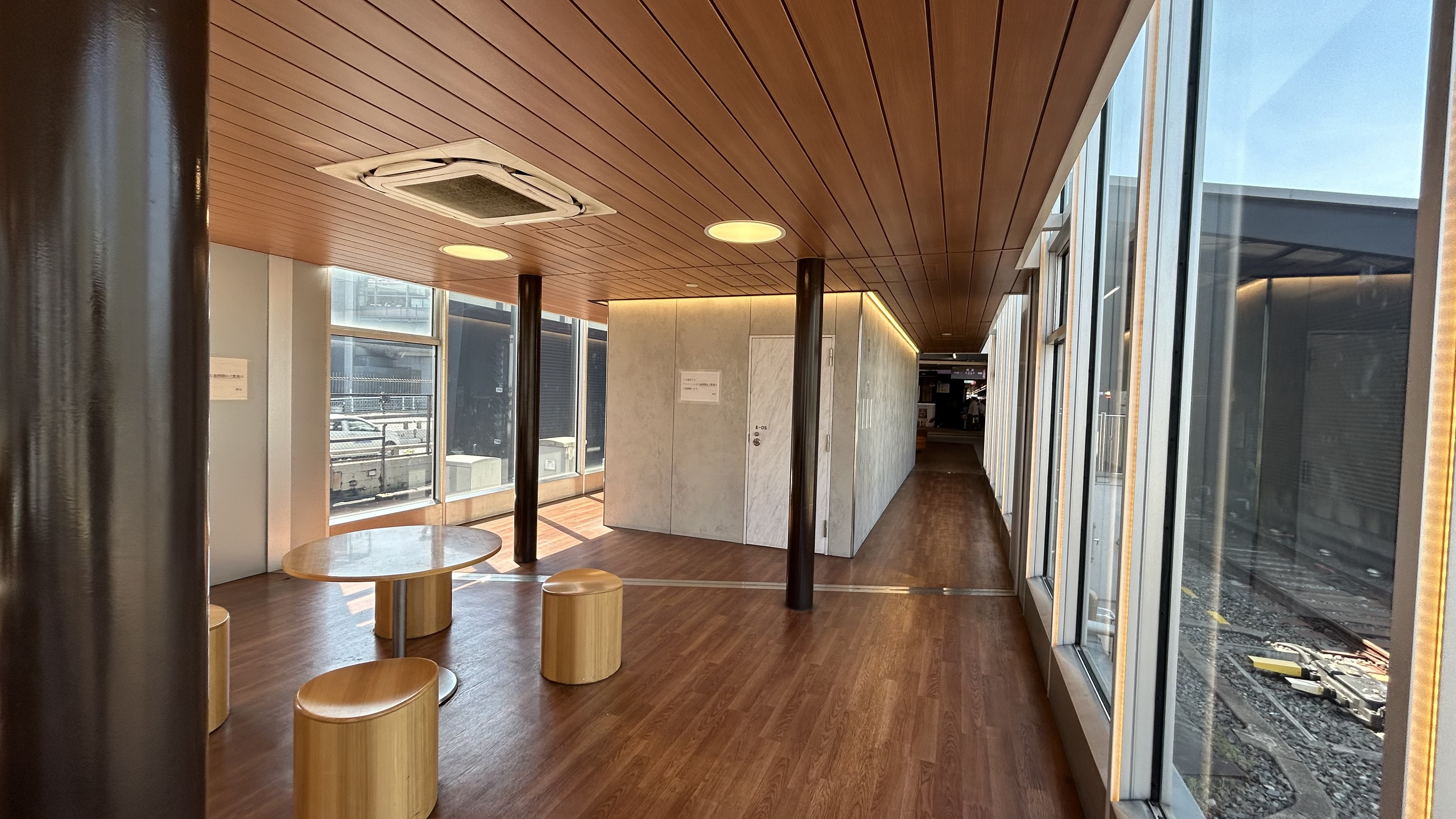
Inside of the viewing space

== Surrounding area ==
Inside the station

- Nippon Travel Agency TiS Shin-Osaka
- JR Tokai Tours Shin-Osaka Branch
- Osaka Prefectural Police, Railway Police Force Shin-Osaka
- Osaka Noren Meguri restaurant (in the paid area for the Shinkansen)

North

- Shin-Osaka Hankyu Building
- Mielparque Osaka
- Hotel La Foret Osaka
- Via Inn Shin-Osaka West
- Konami Sports Club

South

- Nissin Foods
- Shin-Osaka Washington Hotel Plaza
- Osaka Prefectural Police, Railway Police Force Headquarters

East (Hinode side)

- Shin-Osaka Youth Hostel
- Shin-Osaka Station Hotel
- Life Corporation

== See also ==
- List of railway stations in Japan
