= Inouchi Inarizuka Kofun =

Kofun period keyhole-shaped burial mound in Japan

- 井ノ内稲荷塚古墳 (Japanese)
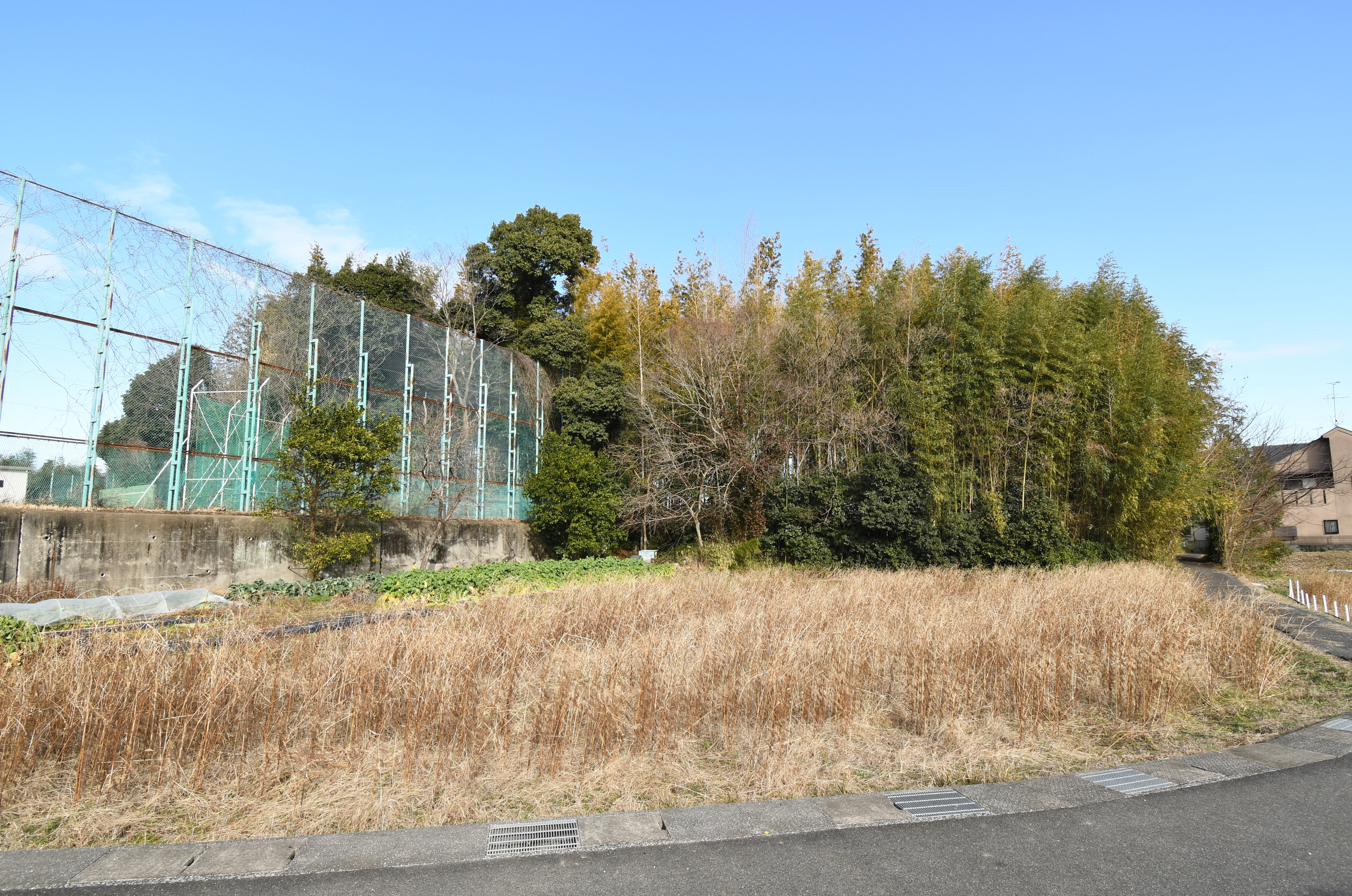
- Inouchi Inarizuka Kofun

- Inouchi Inarizuka Kofun Inouchi Inarizuka Kofun (Japan)
- Interactive map of Inouchi Inarizuka Kofun
- 34°56′28.37″N 135°41′6.20″E
- Type: Kofun
- Periods: Kofun period
- Location: Nagaokyō, Kyoto, Japan
- Region: Kansai region

History
- Built: c.6th century

Site notes
- Public access: Yes (park)

Inouchi Inarizuka Kofun (井ノ内稲荷塚古墳) is a Kofun period keyhole-shaped burial mound, located in the Inouchi neighborhood of Nagaokakyō, Kyoto in the Kansai region of Japan. The tumulus was designated a National Historic Site of Japan as a component of the Otokuni Kofun Cluster in 2016. The artifacts excavated from this kofun are designated Nagaokakyo City Tangible Cultural Properties.

== Overview ==
The Inouchi Inarizuka Kofun is a zenpō-kōen-fun (前方後円墳), which is shaped like a keyhole, having one square end and one circular end, when viewed from above, and is orientated to the south. The mound is built by piling up earth, and there are no traces of terrace, fukiishi roofing stones or haniwa clay figure. The mound is surrounded by a moat. There are two burial facilities: a one-sleeved horizontal-hole stone burial chamber in the circular posterior part and a direct burial wooden coffin in the anterior rectanuglar part. The stone burial chamber at the rear of the mound is a large one, measuring 10.1 meters in total length, with a 4.6 by 2.2 meter main chamber and 5.5 meter long passageway. The upper part of the burial chamber was later removed, so the overall height is unclear. The walls are made of large stones measuring 1.5 meters wide and over one meter high, but the rest of the walls are made of stones about one meter wide, with three levels remaining on the side walls and four levels remaining on the back wall. The floor up to the middle of the main chamber and entrance passage is gravel. The closed facility may have been made of boards or other materials. The layout suggests that it originally contained two coffins parallel to the main axis of the stone chamber. A burial surface was also found on the gravel bed, and a nailless combination wooden coffin measuring 1.7-1.8 meters long and 0.4-0.5 meters wide was discovered from the center of the burial chamber to the entrance passage. Ritual pottery was discovered in a disturbance pit in the burial chamber, so it is speculated that the burial chamber was partly destroyed to obtain stone materials during the construction of Nagaoka-kyo

Archaeological excavations have unearthed a large number of grave goods, including gilt bronze horse equipment and gold sword fittings, as well as accessories, weapons, military equipment, agricultural tools, horse equipment, Sue ware, and Haji ware, from the burial chamber at the rear of the mound, and accessories, weapons, Sue ware, and many other items from the wooden coffin at the front of the mound. The tomb is estimated to have been built in the early 6th century during the late Kofun period. Along with the Mozume Kurumazuka Kofun in neighbouring Mukō, it is an important tomb for having one of the oldest horizontal-entry stone burial chambers on the right bank of the Katsura River. However, unlike the Mozume Kurumazuka Kofun, which introduced a house-shaped stone sarcophagus, the traditional wooden coffin without nails is retained, and the introduction of a new horizontal stone chamber while maintaining traditional burial facilities suggests a traditional local power that differs from the emerging power image of the Monotsume-Kurumazuka Tomb.

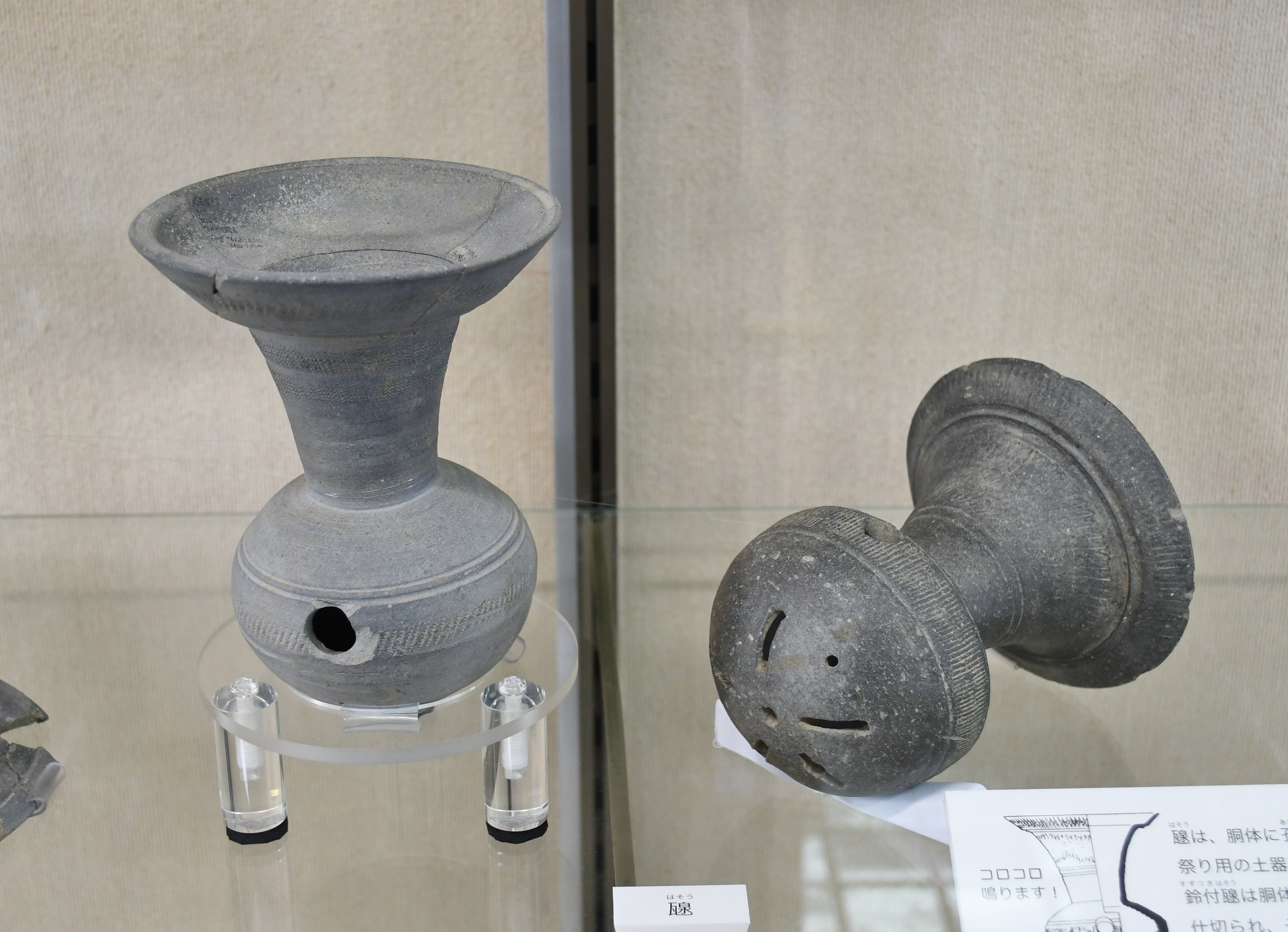
Sue ware from Inouchi Inarizuka Kofun

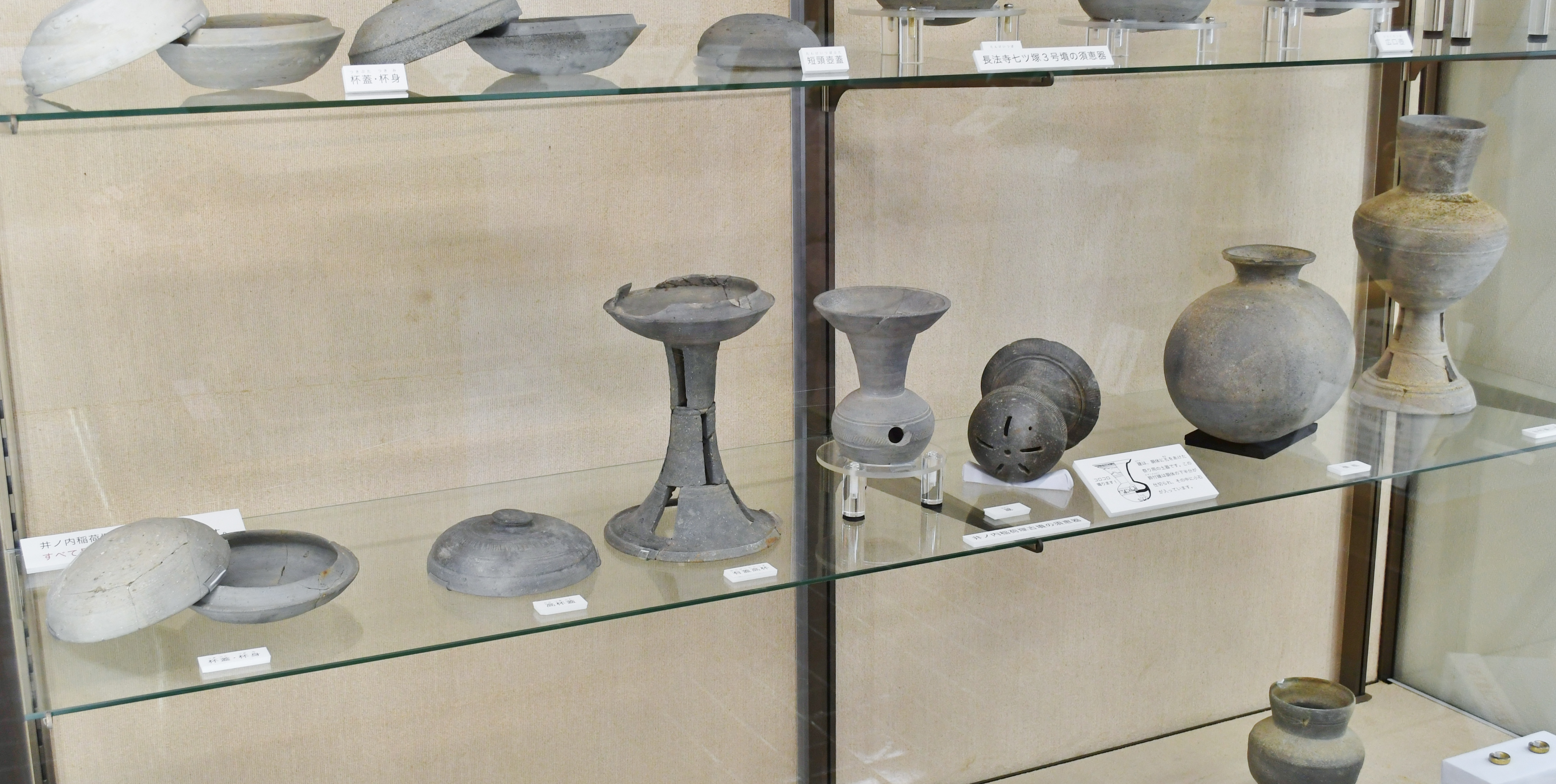
Sue ware from Inouchi Inarizuka Kofun

Total length
46 meters:
Anterior rectangular portion
29.5 meters wide x 3.5 meters high
Posterior circular portion
29.5 meter diameter x 4 meters high
Narrow part
21.5 meter width

The tumulus is about a 2.4 kilometers west from Nishi-Mukō Station on the Hankyu Kyoto Line.

== See also ==
- List of Historic Sites of Japan (Kyoto)
