= Mozume Kurumazuka Kofun =

Kofun period keyhole-shaped burial mound in Japan

- 物集女車塚古墳 (Japanese)
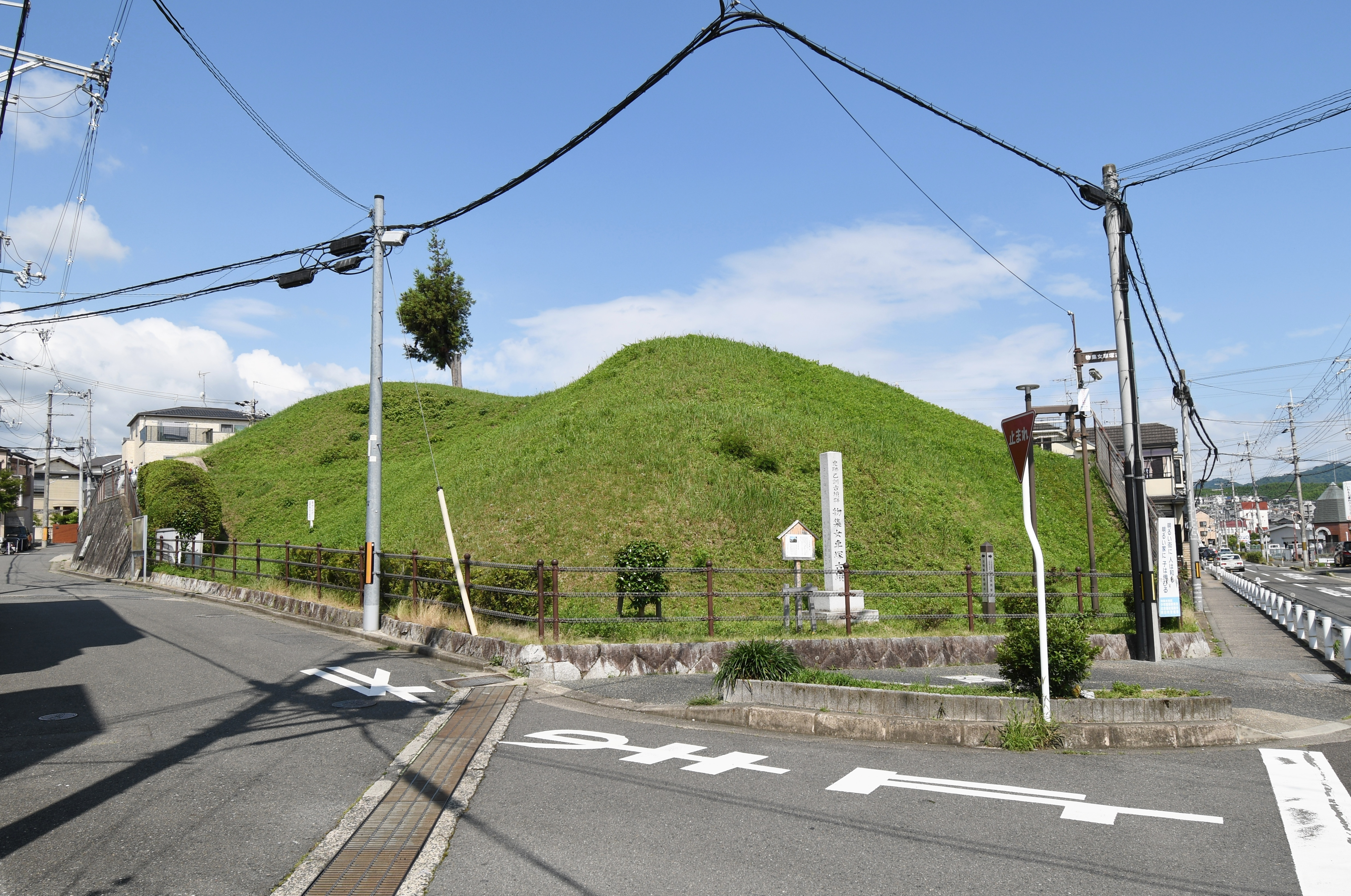
- Mozume Kurumazuka Kofun

- Mozume Kurumazuka Kofun Mozume Kurumazuka Kofun (Japan)
- 34°57′28.8″N 135°41′57.7″E
- Type: Kofun
- Periods: Kofun period
- Location: Mukō, Kyoto, Japan
- Region: Kansai region

History
- Built: c.6th century

Site notes
- Public access: Yes (park)
- National Historic Site of Japan 京都府内の位置

Mozume Kurumazuka Kofun (物集女車塚古墳) is a Kofun period keyhole-shaped burial mound, located in the Nanjō, Monozume-chō neighborhood of Mukō, Kyoto in the Kansai region of Japan. The tumulus was designated a National Historic Site of Japan as a component of the Otokuni Kofun Cluster in 2016. The artifacts excavated from this kofun are designated Kyoto Prefectural Tangible Cultural Properties.

== Overview ==
The Mozume Kurumazuka Kofun was built on a gentle slope 21 meters, above sea level, on the southwestern edge of the Kyoto Basin, in the northeastern part of the Muko Hills. According to legend and Edo period records, it was constructed on the location where the hearse of Emperor Junna (reigned from 823 to 833) was buried; however, the tumulus predates this reign by at least 300 years. Currently, Kyoto Prefectural Highway 67 Saikyo-Takatsuki Line (Monozume Highway) runs along the east side of the mound, and part of the front part was leveled when the highway was constructed. Archaeological excavations have been carried out since 1983.

The mound is a zenpō-kōen-fun (前方後円墳), which is shaped like a keyhole, having one square end and one circular end, when viewed from above, and is orientated to the northeast. The mound was constructed in two tiers, with fukiishi roofing stones and rows of cylindrical haniwa on the outside. A projection is attached to the narrow part on the south side of the mound. The rows of haniwa are thought to have been arranged only near the narrow part of the flat surface of the mound, at the top of the mound, and on the southern projection, and the fukiishi were only applied in a headband shape to the rear circular part and the upper base of the mound at the narrow part. The tumulus was surrounded by a moat.

The burial facility is a single-sided horizontal-hole stone burial chamber in the circular posterior mound, which opens to the south-southeast. It is a large chamber measuring 11 meters in total length, with a 5.1 by 2.6 meter main chamber and a 5.8 meter long by 1,2-1,5 meter wide passage. It shows the characteristics of the "Kinai-type" stone chamber standardized under the Yamato sovereignty. A house-shaped sarcophagus made of tuff was placed inside the stone chamber, and a large number of grave goods were found both inside and outside the sarcophagus. The sarcophagus is perpendicular to the main axis of the chamber, and measures 1.86 meters long, 0.88 meters short, and 0.74 meters high. It consists of three bottom stones, two long side stones, two short side stones, and three cover stones, and each stone except the long side stones has a rope hanging protrusion on the side. The inside and outside of the sarcophagus are painted with red pigment. A shelf-like structure made of seven tuff stones is thought to have existed on top of the cover stone of the sarcophagus, and a stone pillow thought to have been inside the sarcophagus was excavated from the floor of the burial chamber. Two more burials were found intact in the floor of the burial chamber.

Grave goods included accessories such as a wide-belt crown, earrings, and bells, weapons such as a stag antler-shaped twisted ring-headed iron sword, silver sword fittings, a dagger, and an iron spear, horse equipment, and Sue ware pottery. The construction date is estimated to be around the mid-6th century, or the late Kofun period, and it is believed that three people were buried there until the beginning of the 7th century. It is considered to be the tomb of a leader representing the Otokuni region, and is notable for the quantity and quality of its grave goods. The Yamato kingship was under Emperor Keitai at the time.

Currently, the historic site is being maintained and the burial chamber is open to the public, but access to it is restricted and it is only open to the public every spring.

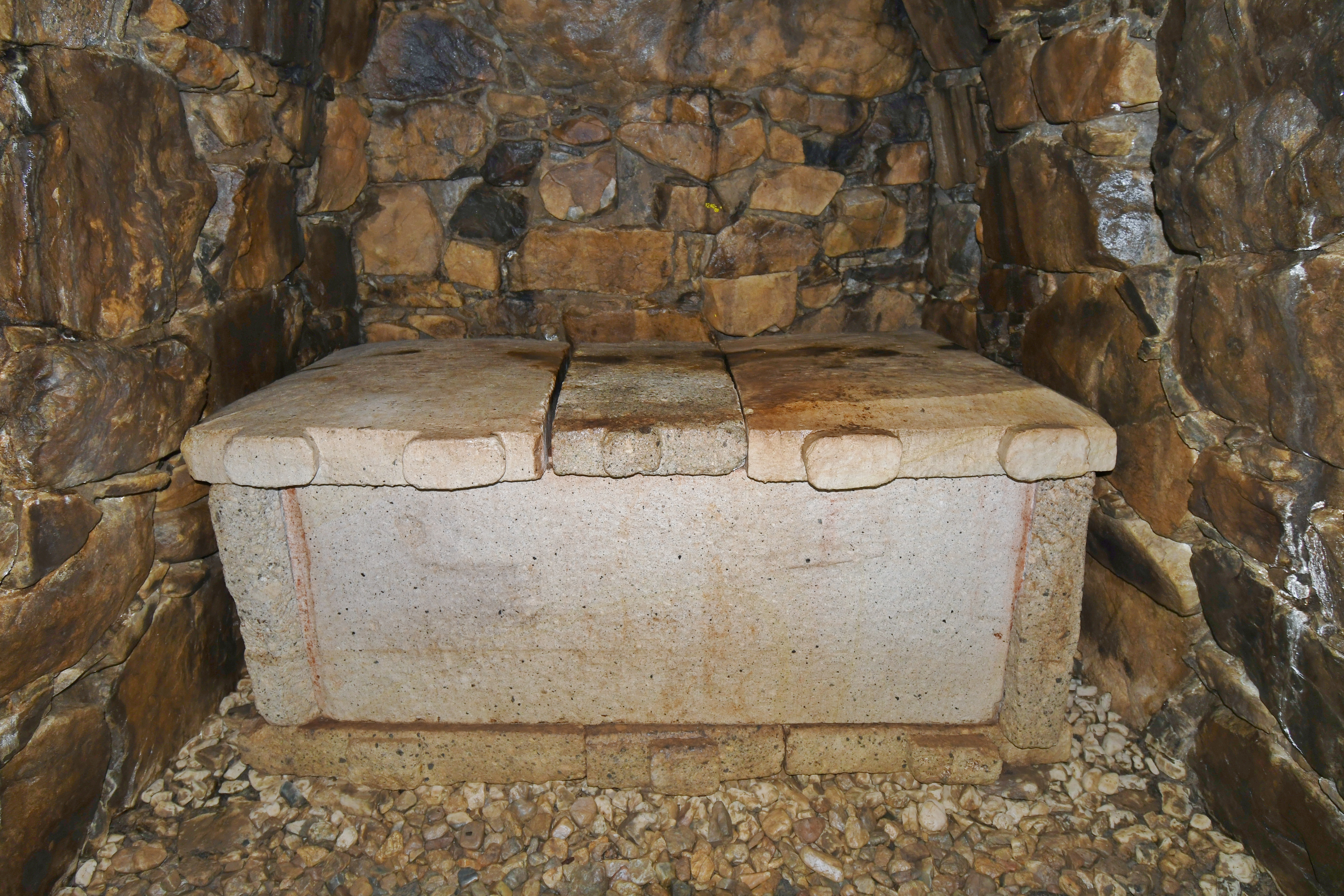
Burial chamber & sarcophagus

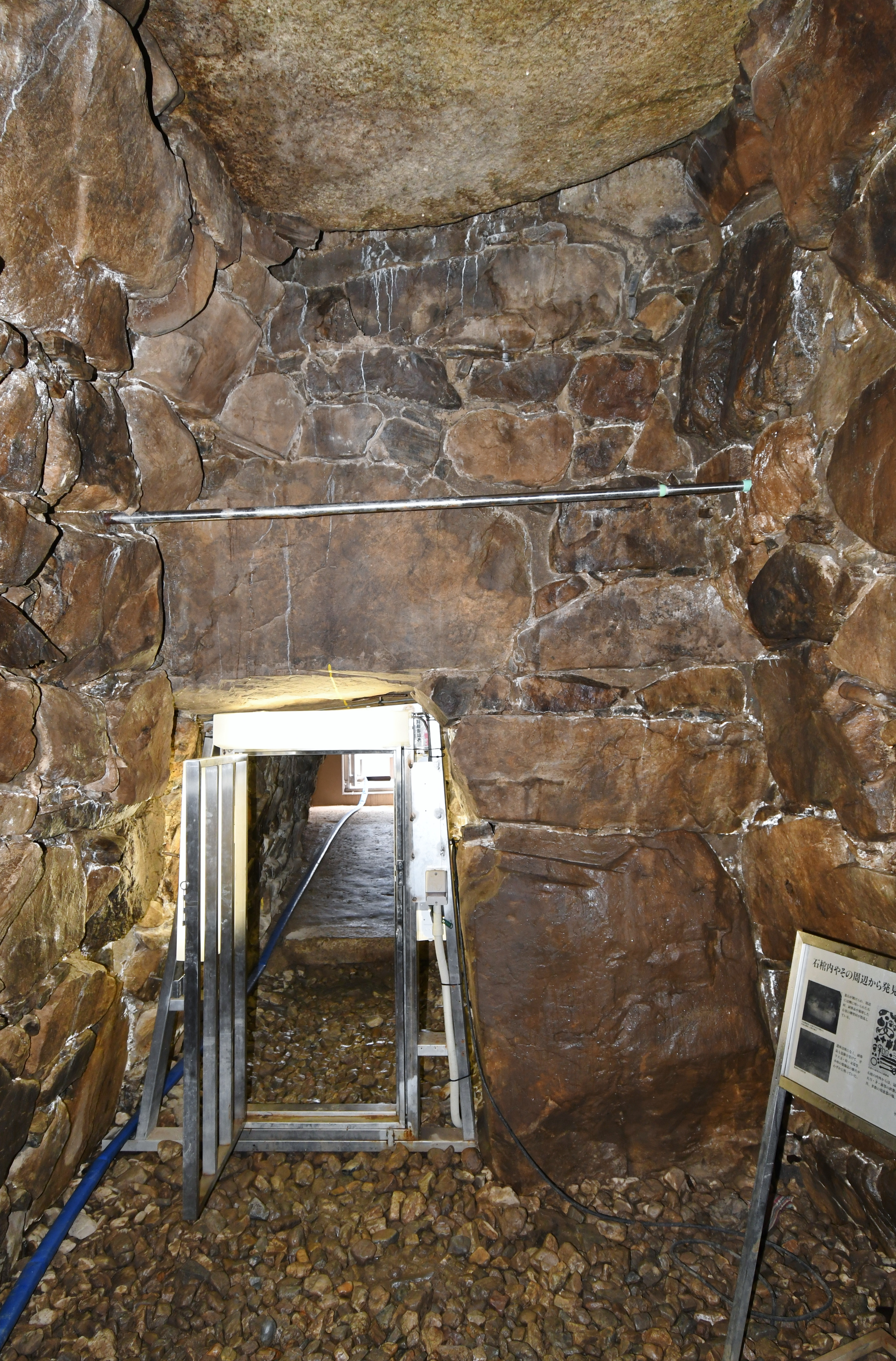
Burial Chamber facing entry

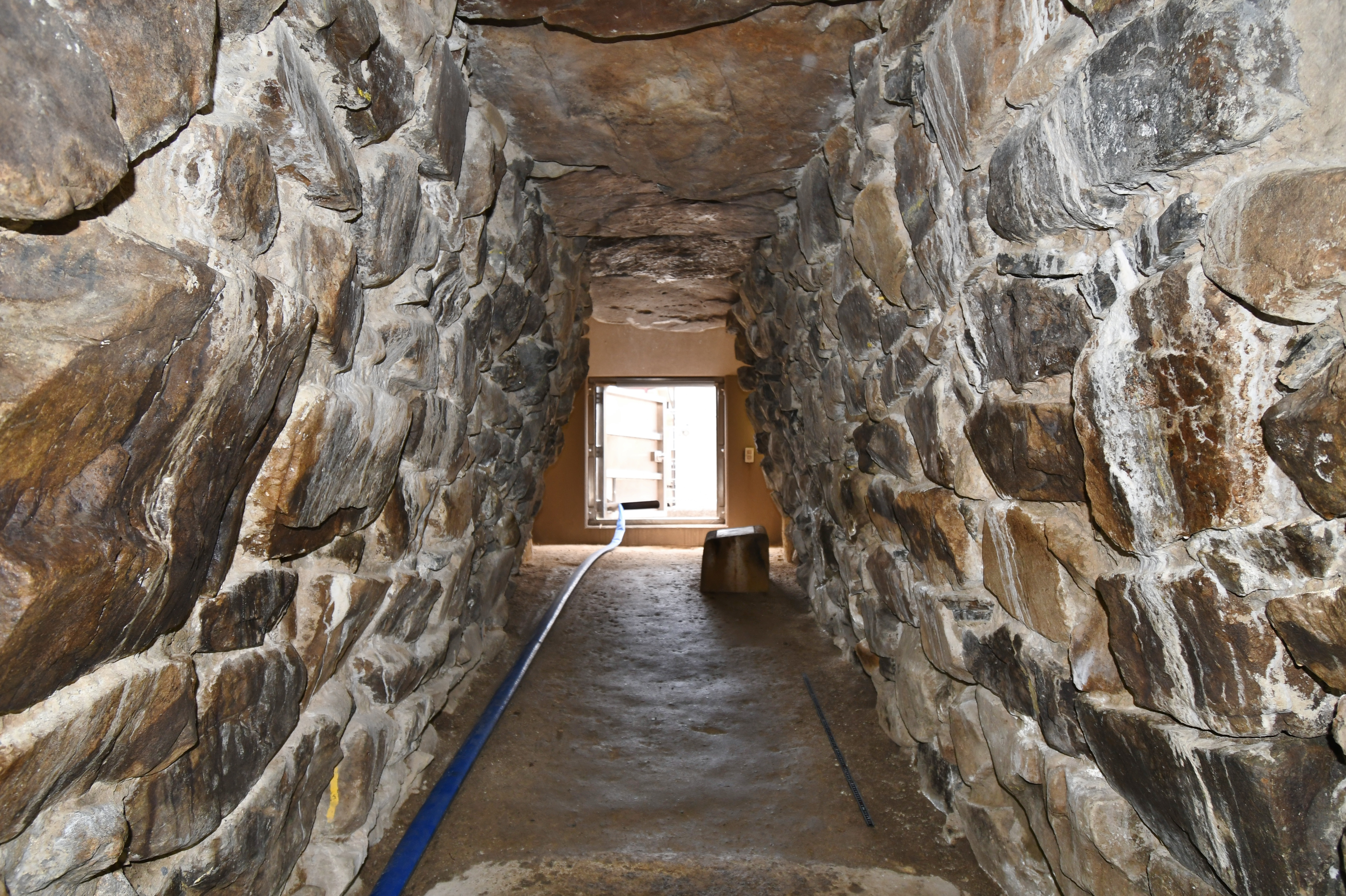
Passageway facing entry

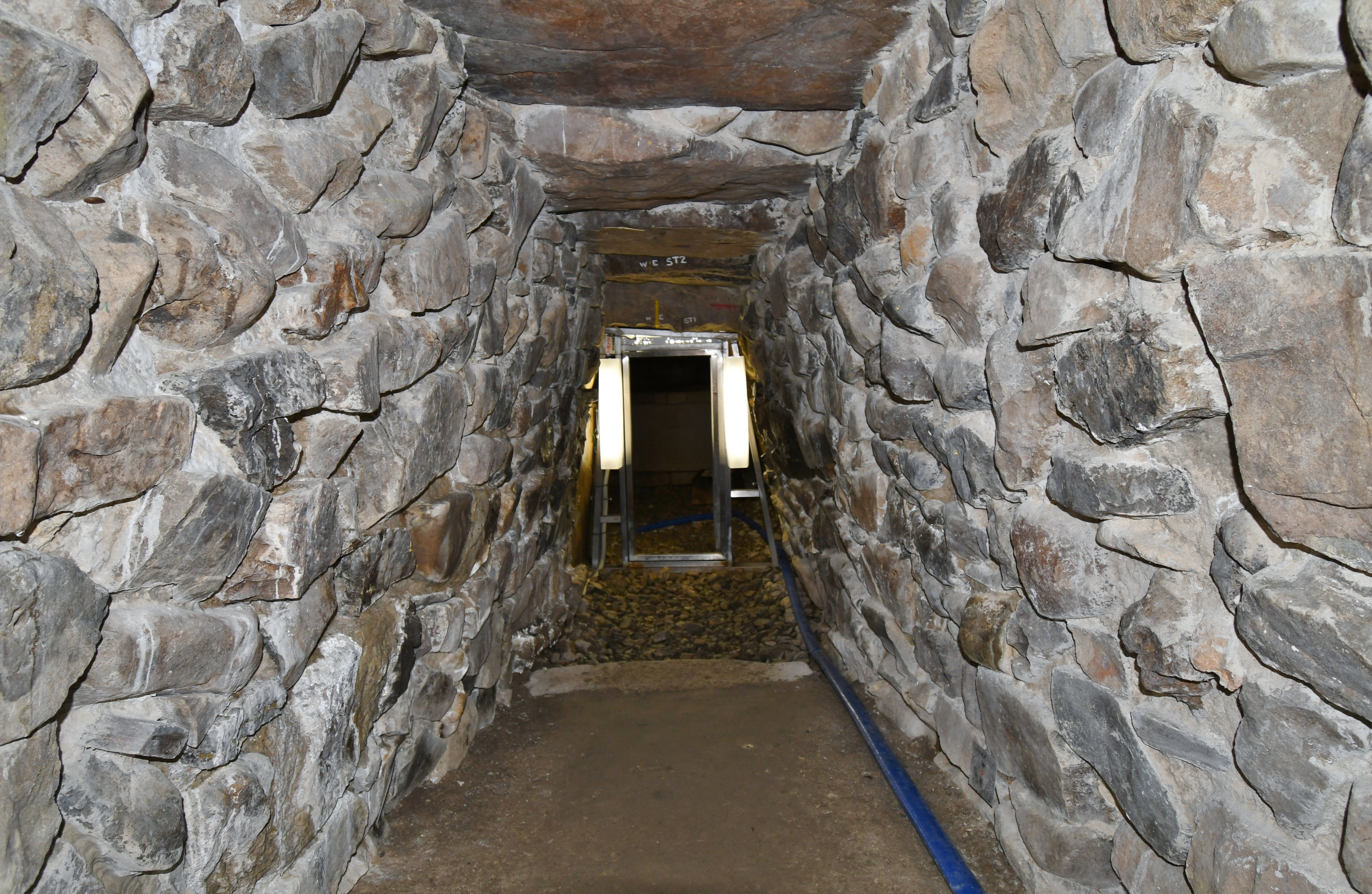
Passageway faching burial chamber

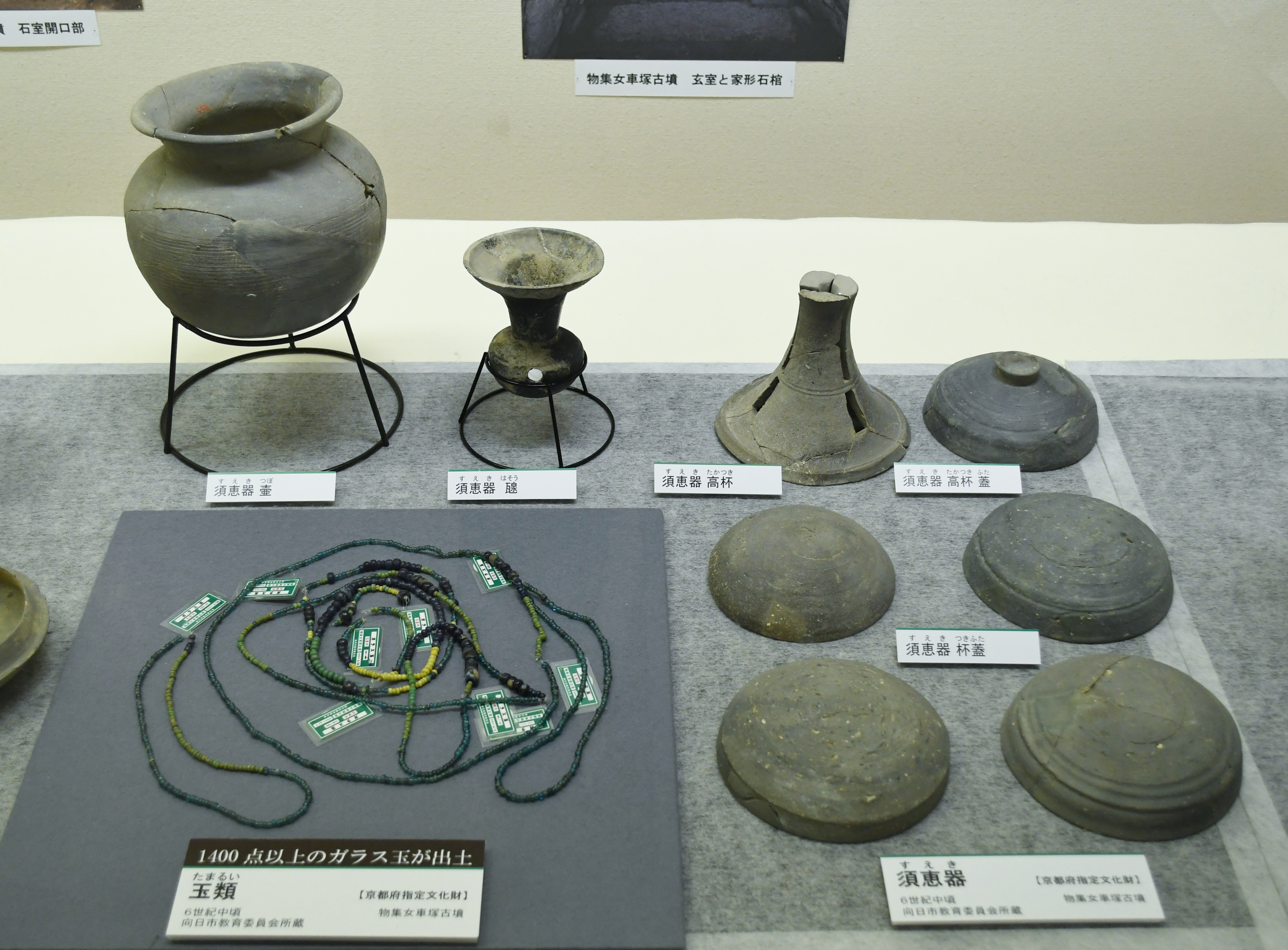
Excavated grave goods

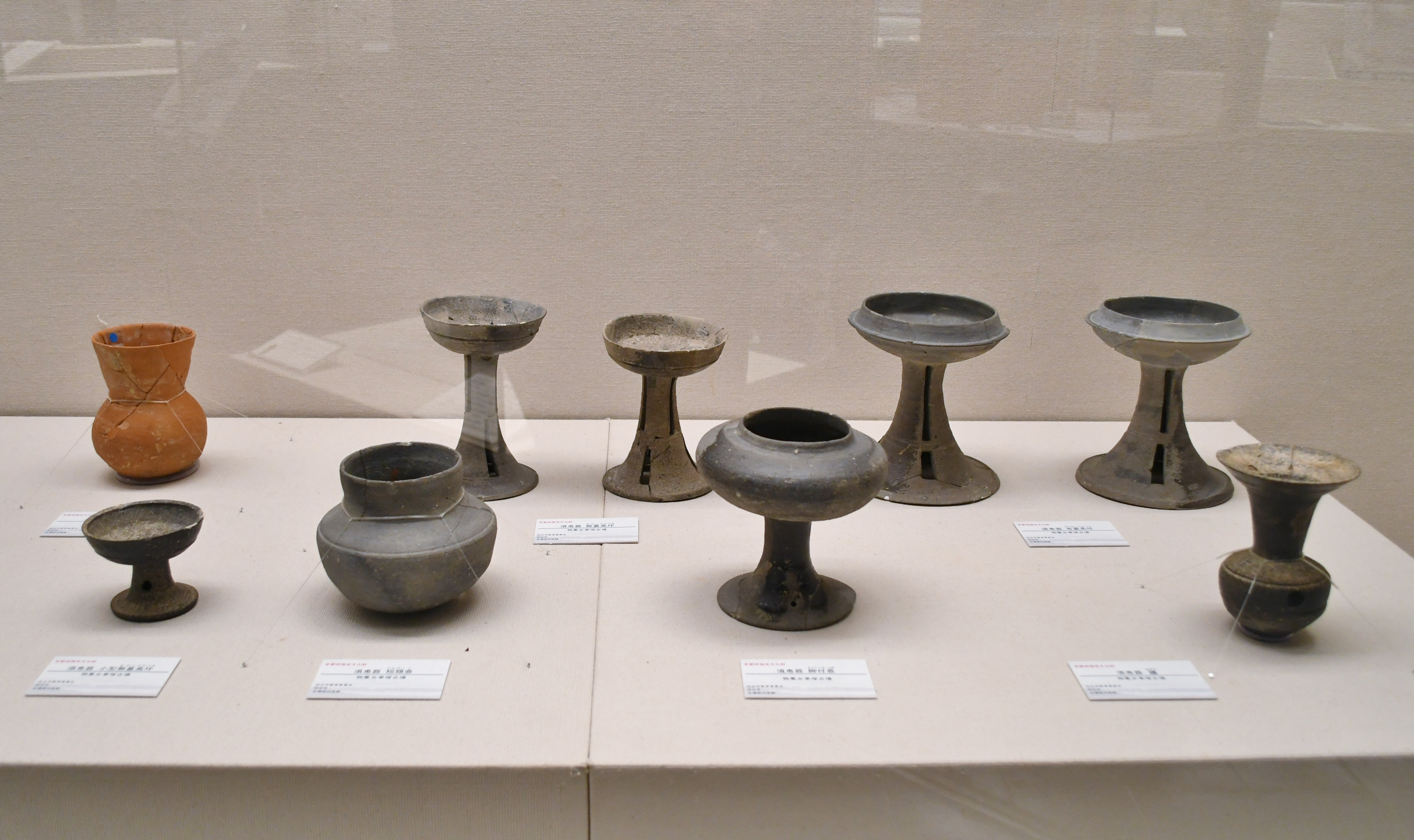
Excavated grave goods

Total length
46 meters:
Anterior rectangular portion
39 meters wide x 8 meters high, 2-tier
Posterior circular portion
24-32 meter diameter x 9 meters high, 2-tiers

The tumulus is about a one kilometer northwest from Higashi-Mukō Station on the Hankyu Kyoto Line.

== See also ==
- List of Historic Sites of Japan (Kyoto)
