= Yamazaki Station (Kyoto) =

Railway station in Ōyamazaki, Kyoto Prefecture, Japan

Yamazaki Station 山崎駅
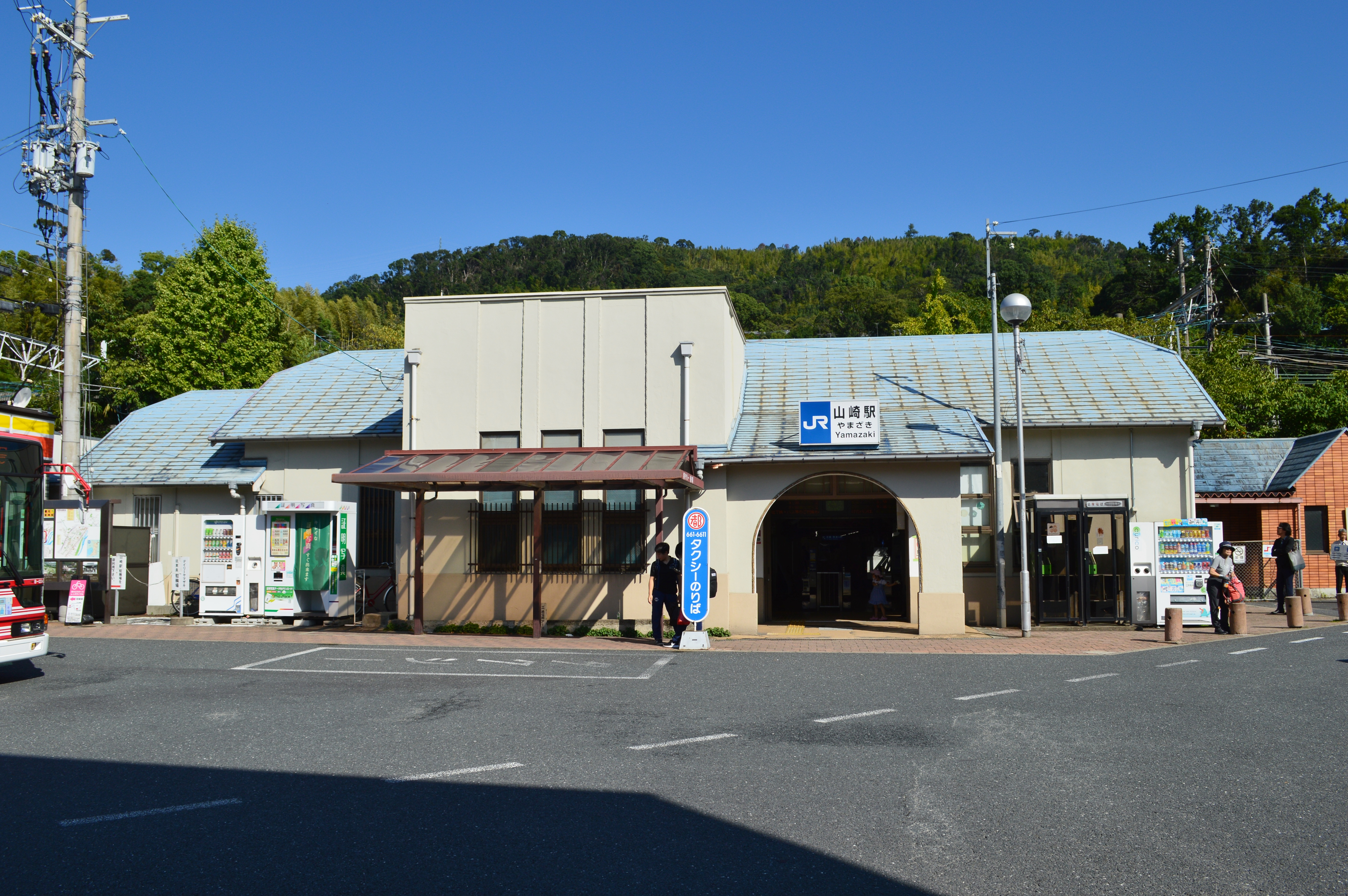
- Yamazaki Station, September 2019

General information
- Location: Nishitani, Ōyamazaki-cho, Otokuni-gun, Kyoto-fu618-0071; Japan
- Coordinates: 34°53′33″N 135°40′48″E
- Owner: JR-West
- Line: Tōkaidō Main Line (JR Kyoto Line)
- Distance: 14.1 km (8.8 miles) from Kyoto
- Platforms: 2 island platforms
- Tracks: 4
- Train operators: JR-West

Construction
- Structure type: Ground level
- Accessible: Yes

Other information
- Station code: JR-A36
- Website: Official website (in Japanese)

History
- Opened: 9 August 1876

Passengers
- FY 2023: 10,396 daily

Services
| Preceding station | JR West | Following station |
|---|---|---|
| Nagaokakyō towards Kyōto | JR Kyōto Line | Shimamoto towards Ōsaka |
Location
- Location within Kyoto Prefecture Location within Japan

Yamazaki Station (山崎駅, Yamazaki-eki) is a passenger railway station in the town of Ōyamazaki, Otokuni District, Kyoto Prefecture, Japan, operated by the West Japan Railway Company (JR West).

== Lines ==
Yamazaki Station is served by the Tōkaidō Main Line (JR Kyōto Line), and lies 14.1 km (8.8 miles) from the starting point of the line at Kyoto and 527.7 kilometers from Tokyo. Only local trains stop at this station.

== Layout ==
The station has two island platforms serving four tracks (compatible with 12-car trains) and one outbound siding track. The outer track side of each platform is closed to permit the passing of express trains. Since the platform is on a slope, the station building is located below the platform. The station is staffed.

=== Platforms ===
| 1 | ■ JR Kyōto Line | passing trains |
| 2 | ■ JR Kyōto Line | for Shin-Osaka, Osaka and Sannomiya |
| 3 | ■ JR Kyōto Line | for Kyōto and Kusatsu |
| 2 | ■ JR Kyōto Line | passing trains |

== History ==
Yamazaki Station opened on 9 August 1876.

Station numbering was introduced to the station in March 2018 with Yamazaki being assigned station number JR-A36. With the privatization of Japanese National Railways (JNR) on 1 April 1987, the station came under the control of JR West.

== Passenger statistics ==
According to the Kyoto Prefecture statistical book, the station was used by 5,941 passengers per day.

== Surrounding area ==
- Bus stop for Keihan Bus (Operated for Kyoto Racecourse when JRA Horse Racing is held)
- Bus stop for Keihan City Bus (Route 13 for Keihan Yodo)
- Bus stop for Hankyu Bus (Route 18 for Hankyu Nagaoka-Tenjin and JR Nagaokakyo via Oyamazaki Town Hall, Koizumibashi and Tomooka)
- Oyamazaki Station (Hankyu Railway Kyoto Line)
- Suntory Yamazaki Distillery

== See also ==
- List of railway stations in Japan
