= Mukōmachi Station =

Railway station in Mukō, Kyoto Prefecture, Japan

Mukōmachi Station 向日町駅
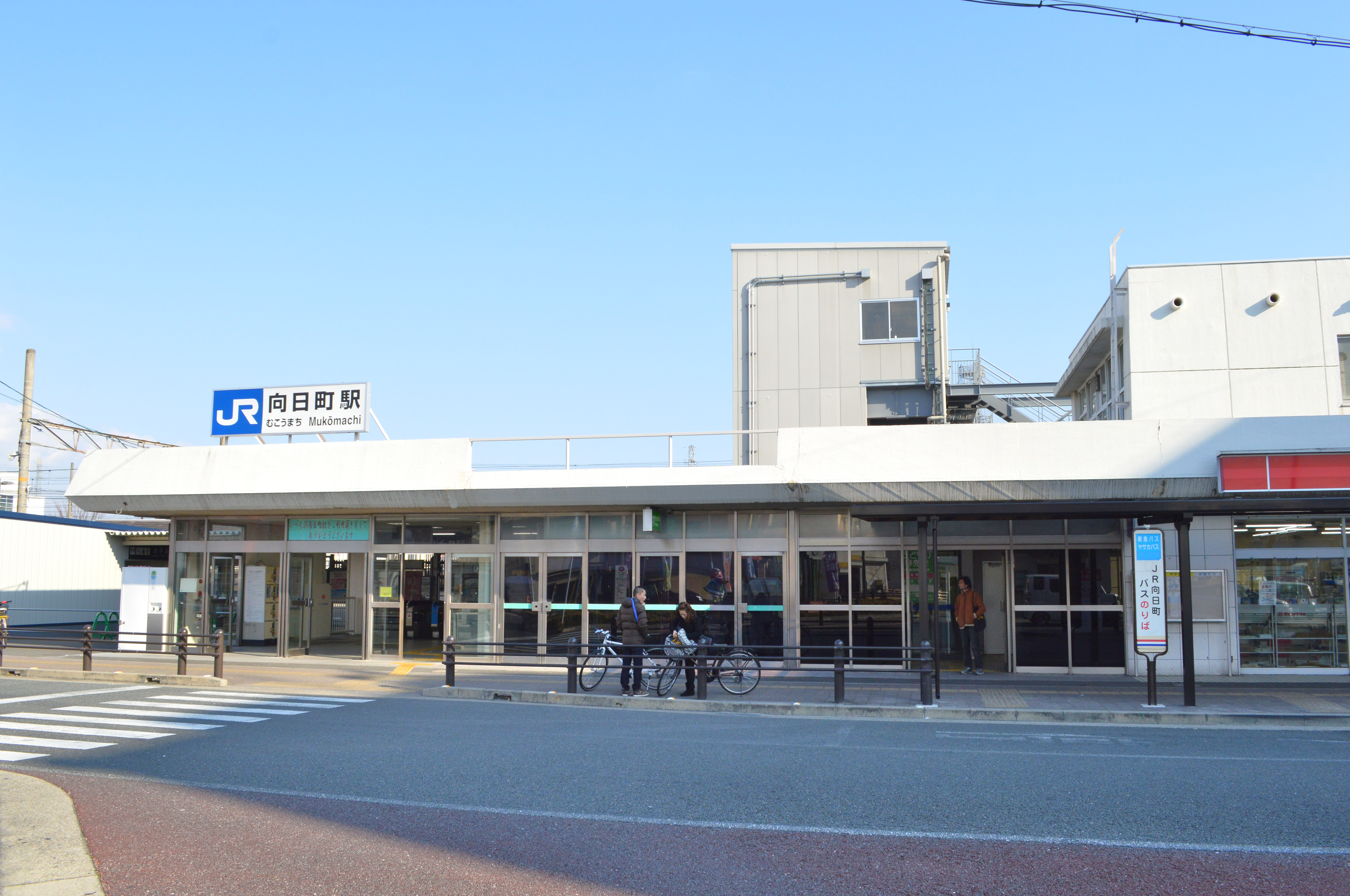
- Mukōmachi Station, December 2015

General information
- Location: Kuguso Teradochō, Mukō-cho, Kyoto-fu 617-0002; Japan
- Coordinates: 34°57′18″N 135°42′34″E
- Owner: JR-West
- Line: Tōkaidō Main Line (JR Kyoto Line)
- Distance: 6.4 km (4.0 miles) from Kyoto
- Platforms: 2 island platforms

Construction
- Structure type: Ground level
- Accessible: Yes

Other information
- Station code: JR-A34

History
- Opened: July 28, 1876

Passengers
- FY 2023: 15,438 daily

Services
Preceding station	JR West	Following station
Katsuragawa towards Kyōto	JR Kyōto Line	Nagaokakyō towards Ōsaka
Location
- Location within Kyoto Prefecture Location within Japan

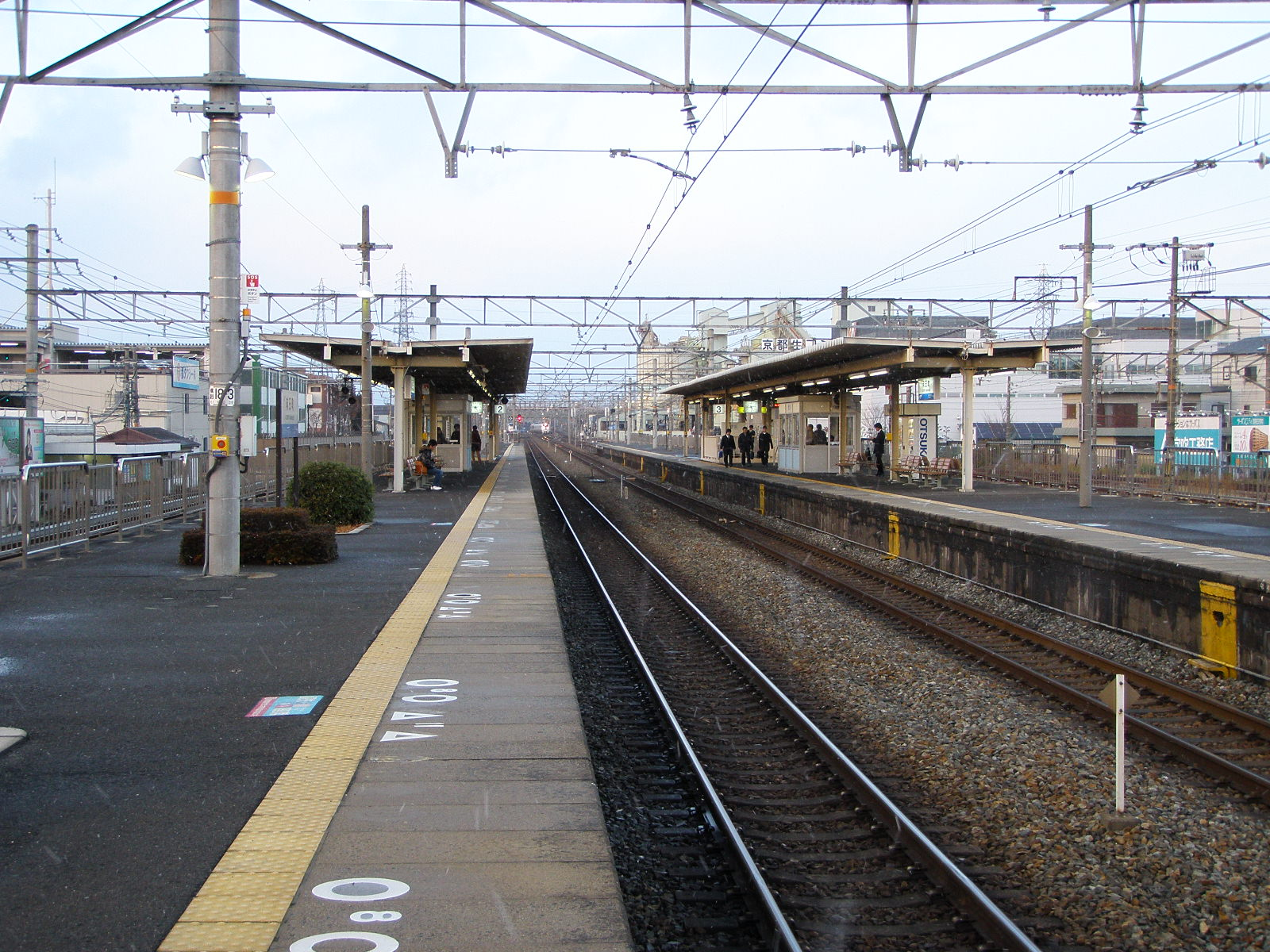
Platforms

Mukōmachi Station (向日町駅, Mukōmachi-eki) is a passenger railway station located in the city of Mukō, Kyoto Prefecture, Japan. It is operated by the West Japan Railway Company (JR West). Mukōmachi Station is one of three railway stations in the city of Mukō; the others are Nishi-Mukō and Higashi-Mukō stations on the Hankyu Kyoto Line.

== Lines ==
Mukōmachi Station is served by trains of the JR Kyoto Line (Tōkaidō Main Line). Only local trains stop at this station except for special rapid service trains which stop in the morning. The station is 6.4 km to Kyoto Station, 36.4 km to Osaka Station and 520.0 km to Tokyo Station.

== Station facilities ==
The track runs north to south and the station building stands west of the tracks. On the tracks there are two island platforms, which are connected by a footbridge. Tracks No. 2 and 3 are for passenger use, with Tracks No. 1 and 4 fenced off as all trains on the outer tracks pass through this station without stopping. The station is staffed.

1	■ JR Kyōto Line	Passing trains only
2	■ JR Kyōto Line	for Shin-Osaka, Osaka and Sannomiya
3	■ JR Kyōto Line	for Takatsuki and Kyoto
4	■ JR Kyōto Line	Passing trains only

== History ==
Mukōmachi Station opened on 28 July 1876, as the first railway station in Kyoto Prefecture when the nation's second-oldest railway line connecting Osaka and Kobe was first extended towards Kyoto. The location of the station was a crossing point of the railway and the Saigoku Highway (西国街道, Saigoku Kaidō) to Kyoto. The railway once terminated at Mukōmachi was extended to the temporary station of Kyoto on 5 September 1876.

Mukōmachi was the name of the predecessor town of the city of Mukō. When Mukō become a city in 1972, the two Hankyu stations were renamed from Nishi-Mukōmachi and Higashi-Mukōmachi respectively, but the name of JNR station was not changed.

Station numbering was introduced to the station in March 2018 with Mukōmachi being assigned station number JR-A34.

== Passenger statistics ==
According to the Kyoto Prefecture statistical book, in fiscal 2019 the station was used by an average of 7994 passengers per day.

== Environs ==
South of the station is the large train yard called Kyoto Sōgō Untensho, a base of passenger trains of West Japan Railway. Higashi-Mukō Station of the Hankyu Kyoto Line is located about 0.5 km southwest of the station. A free bus service connects the station to Mukōmachi Keirinjō bicycle racecourse when keirin races are held there.

== Adjacent stations ==
«	Service	»
JR Kyoto Line
Katsuragawa	Local (Including rapid service after the morning)	Nagaokakyō
Rapid Service (in the morning): Does not stop at this station
Special Rapid Service: Does not stop at this station
Kansai Airport Limited Express "Haruka": Does not stop at this station
Limited Express "Hida": Does not stop at this station
Limited Express "Kuroshio": Does not stop at this station
Limited Express "Super Hakuto": Does not stop at this station
Limited Express "Thunderbird": Does not stop at this station

== See also ==
- List of railway stations in Japan
