= Igenoyama Kofun =

Kofun period keyhole-shaped burial mound in Japan

- 恵解山古墳 (Japanese)
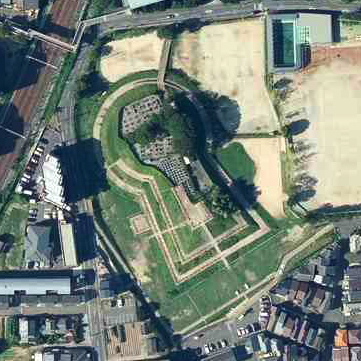
- Igenoyama Kofun

- Igenoyama Kofun Igenoyama Kofun (Japan)
- 34°54′52.3″N 135°41′51.3″E
- Type: Kofun
- Periods: Kofun period
- Location: Nagaokakyō, Kyoto, Japan
- Region: Kansai region

History
- Built: c.5th century

Site notes
- Public access: Yes (park)
- National Historic Site of Japan 京都府内の位置

Igenoyama Kofun (恵解山古墳) is a Kofun period keyhole-shaped burial mound, located in the Shōryuji-Kugai neighborhood of Nagaokakyō, Kyoto in the Kansai region of Japan. The tumulus was designated a National Historic Site of Japan in 1981, and was incorporated into the Otokuni Kofun Cluster in 2016.

== Overview ==
The Igenoyama Kofun was built on the edge of a plateau just 16 meters above sea level on the right bank of the Katsura River. It is estimated to be about 128 meters long, making it the largest tumulus in the Otokuni region. It is a zenpō-kōen-fun (前方後円墳), which is shaped like a keyhole, having one square end and one circular end, when viewed from above and is orientated to the south-southeast. The posterior circular mound is 78.6 meters in diameter and 10.4 meters high, and the anterior rectangular portion is 78.6 meters wide and 7.6 meters high. There is a moat about 30 meters wide around the tumulus, and the total length including the moat is about 180 meters. The surface of the tumulus is covered with sandstone and chert fukiishi roofing stones, and haniwa clay figurines are lined up. It is estimated to have been built in the first half of the 5th century.

The tumulus has been considerably defaced by a cemetery, which has been in existence for several centuries, built on top of the circular mound, but it is believed that there was a pit-type stone burial chamber was once located in the posterior circular mound. The tumulus has been excavated several times. In the 1980 excavation, a chamber to store grave goods was discovered and found to contain over 700 iron weapons (including 146 straight swords, 11 iron swords, 52 daggers, 1 knife, 5 chisel-shaped iron products, 10 fern-shaped blades, and 472 iron arrowheads). The unearthing of such a large number of iron weapons is rare not only in the Yamashiro region, but nationwide. For these reasons, this tumulus is thought to be the tomb of a chief who ruled over the Otokuni region west of the Katsura River in the first half of the 5th century. These excavated items were designated as Kyoto Prefecture Tangible Cultural Property in 1999.

Per local folklore this tumulus was widely believed to have been the field headquarters of Akechi Mitsuhide during the Battle of Yamazaki against Toyotomi Hideyoshi in 1582.

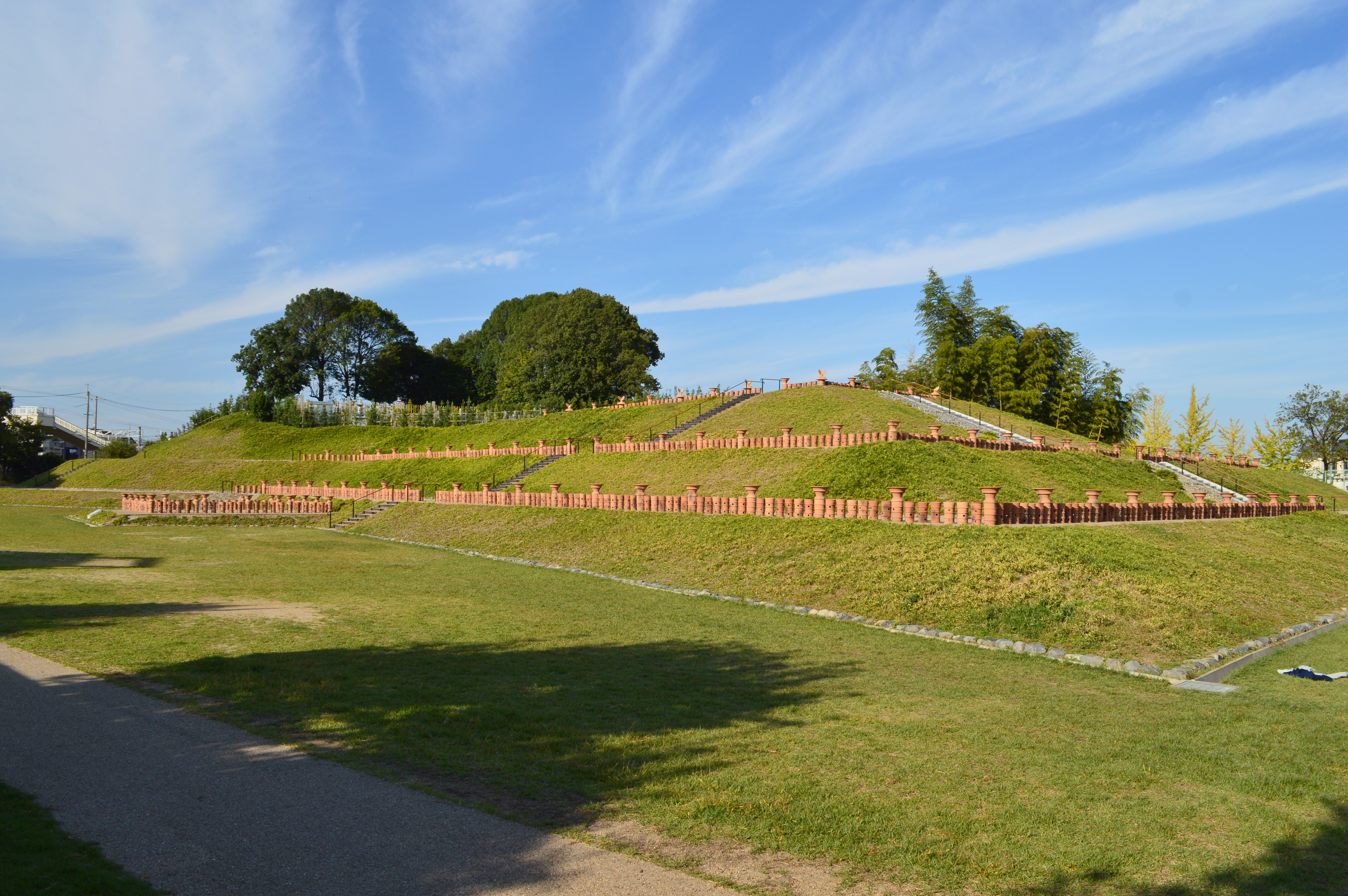
Panoramic view

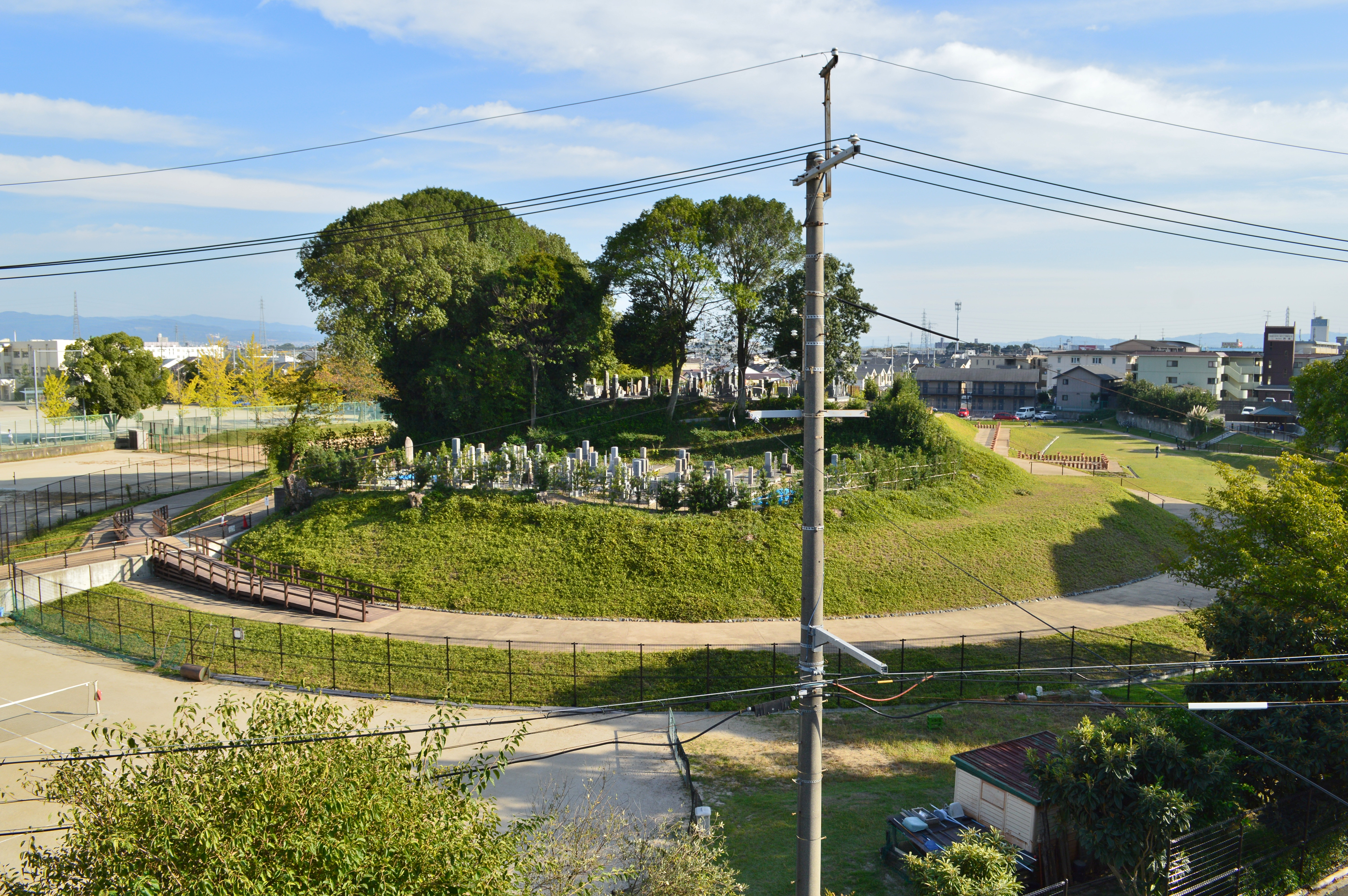
View from the north

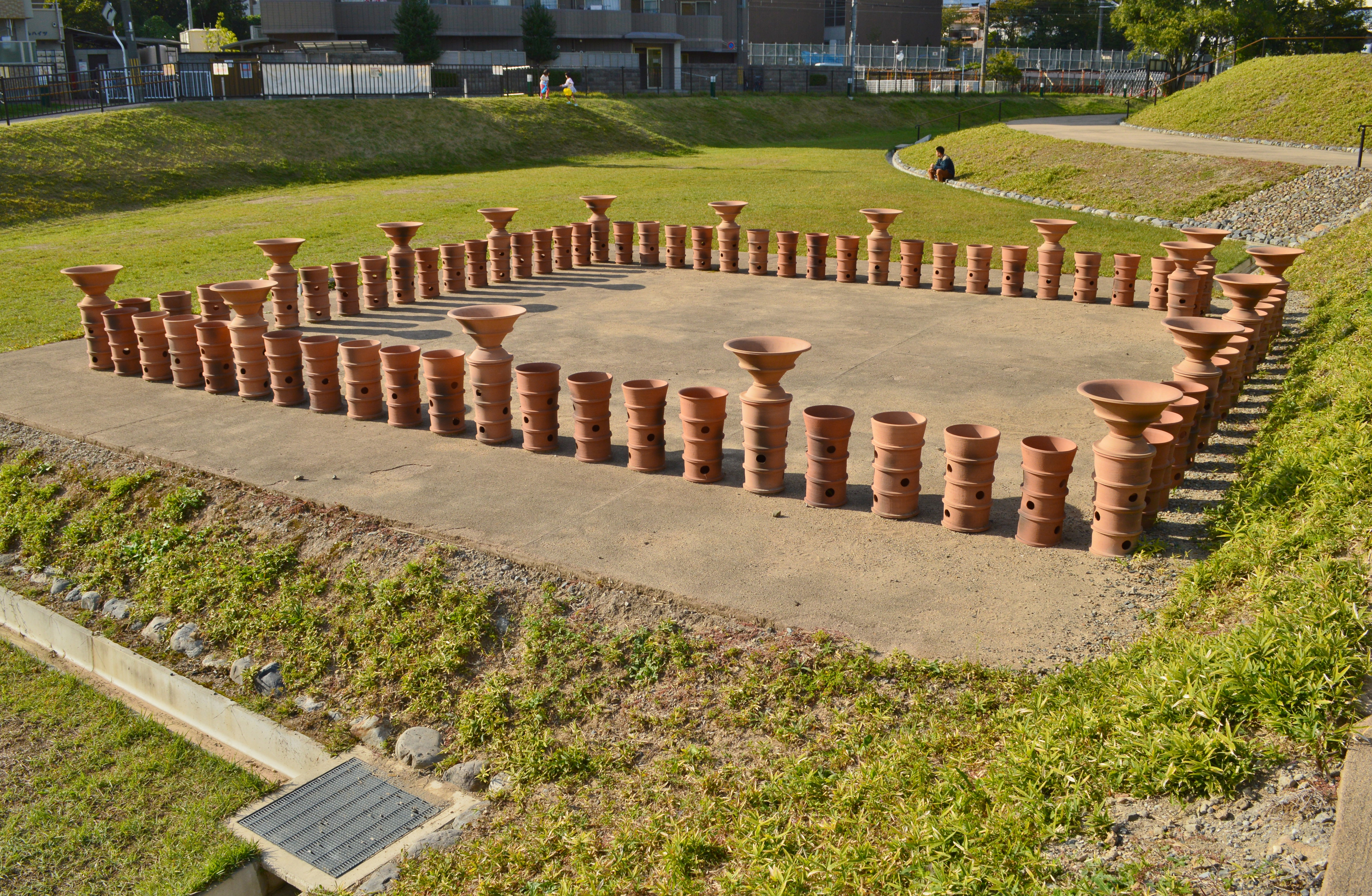
Western ceremonial platform

The tumulus is currently maintained and open to the public as the Igenoyama Kofun Park. The tumulus is about a 20-minute walk from Nagaokakyō Station on the JR West Tōkaidō Main Line.

== See also ==
- List of Historic Sites of Japan (Kyoto)
