= 2005 Nagaokakyō city assembly election =

Nagaokakyō, Kyoto, held an election for the city assembly on October 2, 2005. Independents won the most seats while the Japanese Communist Party gathered most party votes.

== Results ==
Summary of the October 2, 2005 Nagaokakyō City Assembly election results
Parties	Votes	%	Seats
Japanese Communist Party (日本共産党, Nihon Kyōsan-tō)	6,538		6
New Komeito Party (公明党, Kōmeitō)	4,435		4
Democratic Party of Japan (民主党, Minshutō)	3,205		2
Liberal Democratic Party (自由民主党, Jiyū Minshutō)	1,955		1
Independents	17,902		13
Total (turnout 55.18 %)	34,398	100.00	26
