= Ōyamazaki Station =

Railway station in Ōyamazaki, Kyoto Prefecture, Japan

Ōyamazaki Station 大山崎駅
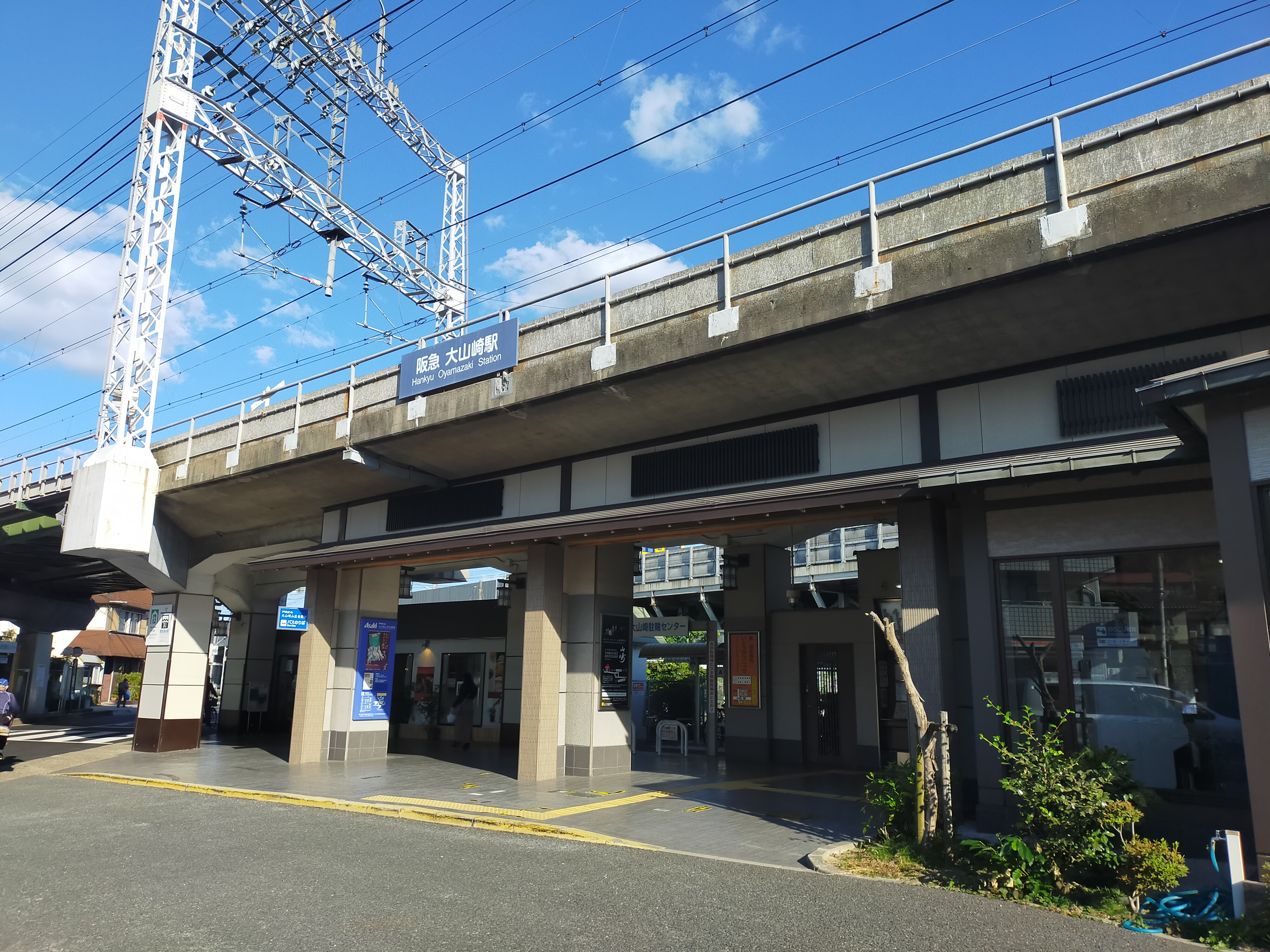
- Ōyamazaki Station, October 2022

General information
- Location: 13-2 Myojima Ōyamazaki, Otokuni-gun, Kyoto-fu 618-0071; Japan
- Coordinates: 34°53′29″N 135°40′54″E
- Operator: Hankyu Railway.
- Line: ■ Hankyu Kyoto Line
- Distance: 27.7 km (17.2 miles) from Jūsō
- Platforms: 2 Side platforms
- Tracks: 2

Construction
- Structure type: Elevated
- Accessible: Yes

Other information
- Status: Staffed
- Station code: HK-75
- Website: Official website

History
- Opened: 1 November 1928

Passengers
- FY2019: 7411 daily

Services
Hankyu Kyoto Line
Commutation Limited Express: Does not stop at this station
Limited Express: Does not stop at this station
Semi limited Express: Does not stop at this station
Express: Does not stop at this station
Minase	Semi-Express	Nishiyama-tennozan
Minase	Local	Nishiyama-tennozan
Location
- Location within Osaka Prefecture Location within Japan

Ōyamazaki Station (大山崎駅, Ōyamazaki-eki) is a passenger railway station located in the town of Ōyamazaki, Otokuni District, Kyoto Prefecture, Japan. It is operated by the private transportation company Hankyu Railway.

== Lines ==
Ōyamazaki Station is served by the Hankyu Kyoto Line, and is located 27.7 kilometers from the terminus of the line at Jūsō and 30.1 kilometers from Osaka-umeda. Only local trains stop at this station.

== Layout ==
The station has two elevated opposed side platforms, with the station facilities underneath.

=== Platforms ===
1	■ Kyoto Line	for Kyoto-kawaramachi, Katsura and Arashiyama
2	■ Kyoto Line	for Osaka-umeda, Tengachaya, Kita-Senri, Kobe-sannomiya, and Takarazuka

== History ==
Oyamazaki Station opened on 1 November 1928.

Station numbering was introduced to all Hankyu stations on 21 December 2013 with this station being designated as station number HK-75.

== Passenger statistics ==
In fiscal 2019, about 7,411 passengers used this station daily.

== Surrounding area ==
- Yamazaki Station (JR West)
- Battle of Yamazaki site
- Asahi Beer Oyamazaki Villa Museum of Art
- Oyamazaki Town History Museum

== See also ==
- List of railway stations in Japan
