= Nishiyama Tennozan Station =

Railway station in Nagaokakyō, Kyoto Prefecture, Japan

Nishiyama-tennozan Station 西山天王山駅
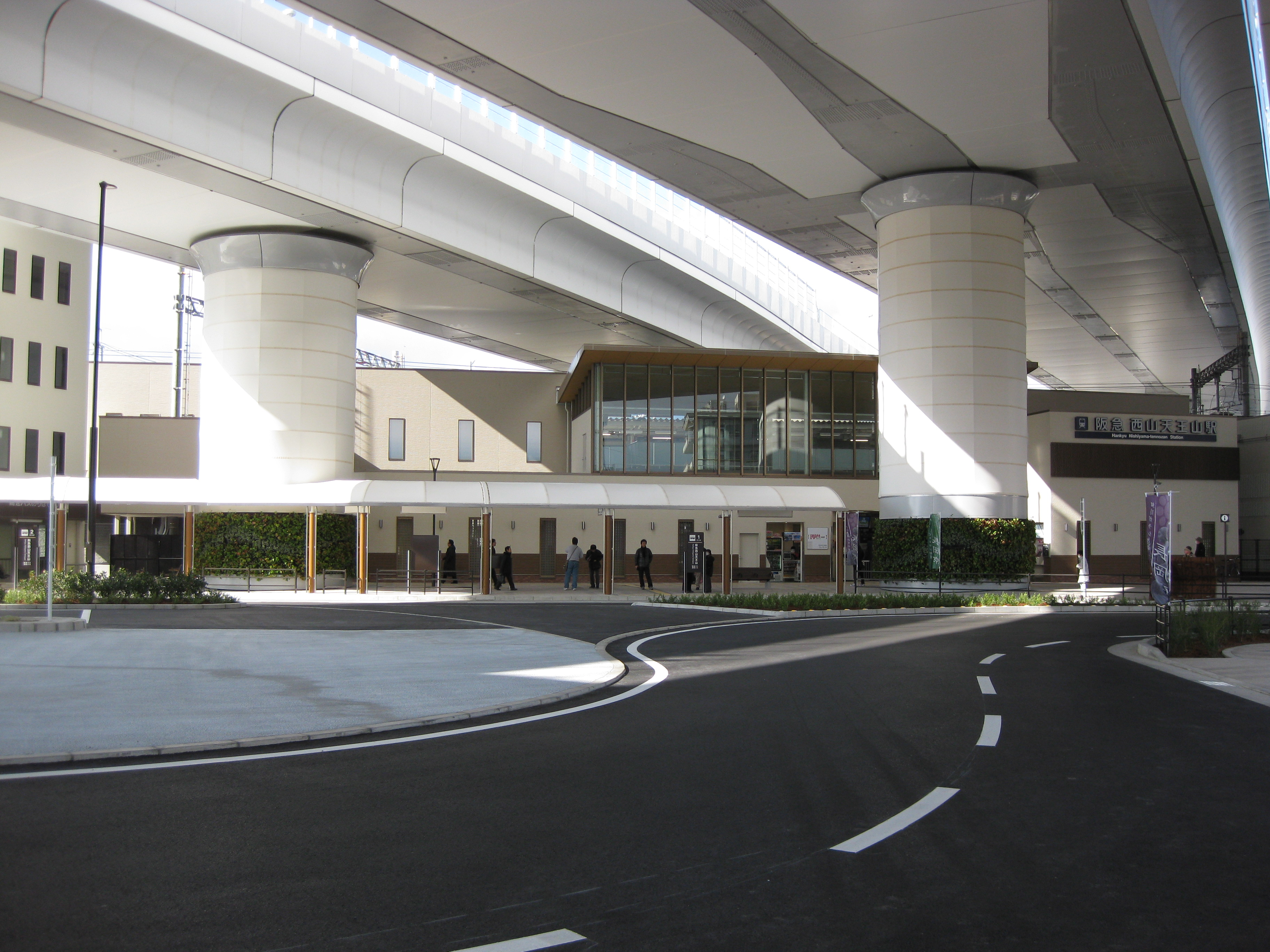
- Nishiyama-tennozan Station east entrance, December 2013

General information
- Location: 4-chōme-22 Tomooka, Nagaokakyō-shi, Kyoto-fu 617-0843; Japan
- Coordinates: 34°54′48″N 135°41′19″E
- Operator: Hankyu Railway.
- Line: ■ Hankyu Kyoto Line
- Distance: 30.2 km (18.8 miles) from Jūsō
- Platforms: 2 side platforms
- Tracks: 2
- Connections: Bus stop

Construction
- Structure type: At grade
- Accessible: yes

Other information
- Status: Staffed
- Station code: HK-76
- Website: Official website

History
- Opened: 21 December 2013

Passengers
- FY2019: 14,695 daily

Services
Hankyu Kyoto Line (HK-76)
Limited Express: Does not stop at this station
Commutation Limited Express: Does not stop at this station
Semi limited Express: Does not stop at this station
Express: Does not stop at this station
Ōyamazaki (HK-75)	Semi-Express	Nagaoka-Tenjin (HK-77)
Ōyamazaki (HK-75)	Local	Nagaoka-Tenjin (HK-77)
Location
- Location within Osaka Prefecture Location within Japan

Nishiyama-Tennōzan Station (西山天王山駅, Nishiyama-Tennōzan-eki; station number: HK-76) is a passenger railway station located in the city of Nagaokakyō, Kyoto, Japan. It is operated by the private railway operator Hankyu Railway.

== Lines ==
Nishiyama-Tennōzan Station is served by the Hankyu Kyoto Line, and is located 30.2 kilometers from the terminus of the line at Jūsō and 32.6 kilometers from Osaka-umeda.

== Station layout ==
Nishiyama-Tennōzan Station is located under Kyoto Jūkan Expressway. The station has two side platforms serving two tracks, connected by an underground passage.

=== Platforms ===
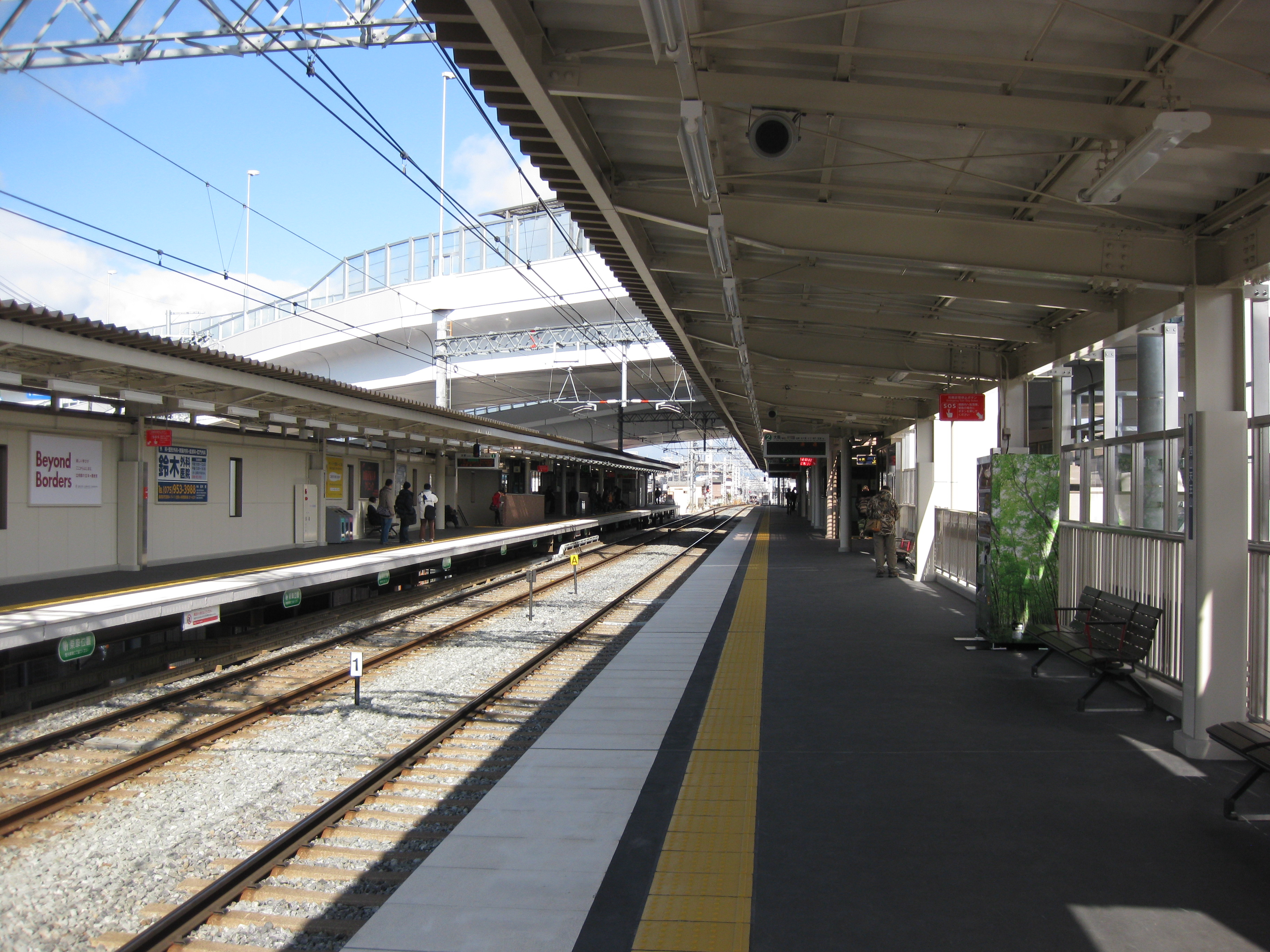
The platforms, December 2013

1	■ Hankyu Kyoto Main Line	for Kyoto-kawaramachi and Arashiyama
2	■ Hankyu Kyoto Main Line	for Osaka-umeda, Tengachaya, Kita-Senri, Kobe-sannomiya, and Takarazuka

== History ==
Nishiyama Tennozan Station opened on 21 December 2013 and is the 87th station operated by Hankyu Corporation. Station numbering was introduced to all Hankyu stations on this date with this station being designated as station number HK-76.

== Passenger statistics ==
In fiscal 2019, the station was used by an average of 14,695 passengers daily

== Surrounding area ==
- Kyoto Jūkan Expressway
- Suntory Kyoto Beer Factory
- Kyoto Prefectural Nishi-Otokuni Senior High School
- Nagaoka Healthcare Center
- Mount Tennōzan

== Bus services ==
Kōsoku Nagaokakyō Bus Stop and Nishiyama Tennōzan Bus Terminal were opened with the opening of this station. The former is an expressway bus stop by an elevated highway (Kyoto-Jukan Expressway) and is accessed by elevators.

=== Hankyu Nishiyama Tennozan ===
- Hankyu Bus
  - Route 1: for Kanegahara
  - Route 3: for JR Nagaokakyo via Tomooka and Hankyu Nagaoka-Tenjin
  - Route 5: for JR Nagaokakyo, Kofudai and Mitakedai
  - Route 6: for JR Nagaokakyo, Mitakedai and Kofudai
  - Route 7: for JR Nagaokakyo, Saiseikai Hospital and Mitakedai
  - Route 48: for Shin-Yamazakibashi via Obatabashi
  - Route 80: for JR Yamazaki via Saihoji, Emmyoji and Hankyu Oyamazaki / for Hankyu Higashi-Muko via Tomooka, Hankyu Nagaoka-Tenjin and JR Nagaokakyo
  - Route 82: for Koizumibashi via Saihoji / for JR Nagaokakyo via Tomooka and Hankyu Nagaoka-Tenjin
- Hankyu Bus and Keihan Bus
  - Route 90: for JR Nagaokakyo / for Keihan Yodo

=== Kōsoku Nagaokakyō ===
- Hankyu Bus, Hankyu Kanko Bus, West JR Bus, Keisei Bus
  - Kobe, Osaka - Tokyo, Tokyo Disney Resort, Chiba
  - Osaka - Ina (Alpen Ina)
  - Osaka - Suwa (Alpen Suwa)
  - Tango - Kyoto
  - Osaka, Kyoto - Atsugi, Machida, Yokohama (Harbor Light, Youth Harbor Light)

== See also ==
- List of railway stations in Japan
