= Nagaokakyō Station =

Railway station in Nagaokakyō, Kyoto Prefecture, Japan

Nagaokakyō Station 長岡京駅
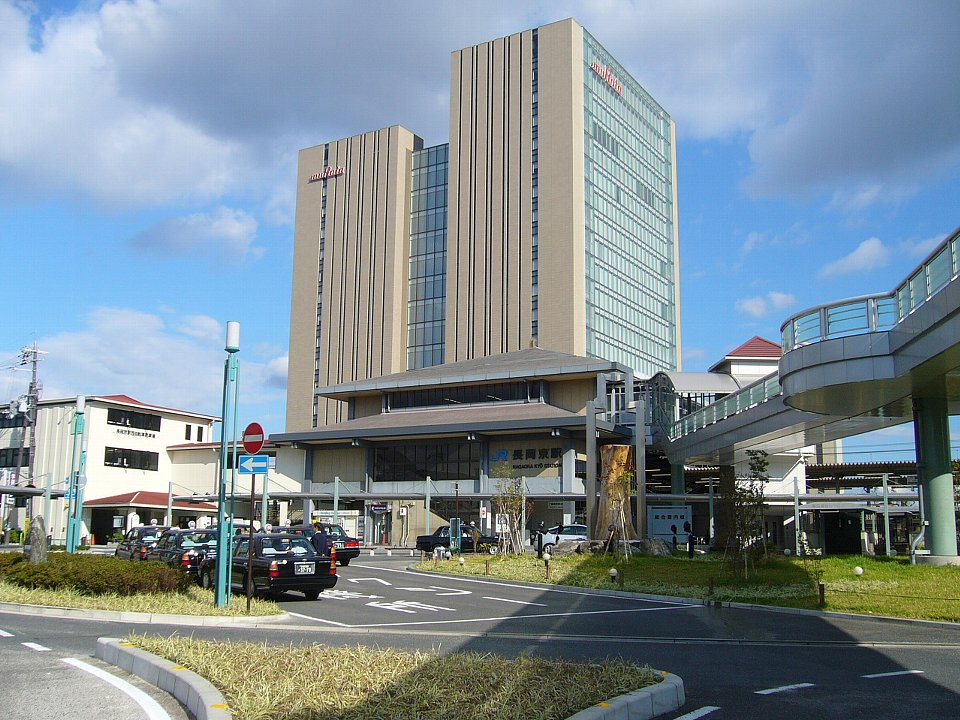
- Nagaokakyō Station in front of high-rise Murata Manufacturing headquarters

General information
- Location: Kōtari Nichome, Nagaokakyō-shi, Kyoto-fu 617-0833; Japan
- Coordinates: 34°55′24.66″N 135°42′2.51″E
- Owner: JR-West
- Line: Tōkaidō Main Line (JR Kyoto Line)
- Distance: 10.1 km (6.3 miles) from Kyoto
- Platforms: 2 island platforms
- Tracks: 4
- Train operators: JR-West

Construction
- Structure type: Elevated
- Accessible: Yes

Other information
- Station code: JR-A35
- Website: Official website (in Japanese)

History
- Opened: 1 August 1931
- Former names: Kōtari (until 1995)

Passengers
- FY 2023: 36,062 daily

Services
Preceding station	JR West	Following station
Mukōmachi towards Kyōto	JR Kyōto Line	Yamazaki towards Ōsaka
Location
- Location within Kyoto Prefecture Location within Japan

Nagaokakyō Station (長岡京駅, Nagaokakyō-eki) is a passenger railway station located in the city of Nagaokakyō, Kyoto Prefecture, Japan, operated by the West Japan Railway Company (JR West). Nagaokakyō Station is one of the two railway stations in the city of Nagaokakyō. The other is Nagaoka-Tenjin Station on the Hankyu Kyoto Line.

== Lines ==
Nagaokakyō Station is served by the Tōkaidō Main Line (JR Kyōto Line), and lies 10.1 km (6.3 miles) from the starting point of the line at Kyoto, 32.7 km to Osaka and 523.7& kilometers from Tokyo. Only local trains stop at this station.

== Station layout ==
Nagaokakyō Station has two island platforms connected by an elevated station building. The station has a Midori no Madoguchi staffed ticket office. Tracks No. 1 and 4 are fenced as all trains on the outer tracks pass through this station without stopping.

1	■ JR Kyōto Line	Passing trains only
2	■ JR Kyōto Line	for Kyōto and Kusatsu
3	■ JR Kyōto Line	for Shin-Osaka, Osaka and Sannomiya
4	■ JR Kyōto Line	Passing trains only

== Passenger statistics ==
According to the Kyoto Prefecture statistical book, in fiscal 2019 the station was used by 20,521 passengers per day.

== History ==
Nagaokakyō station opened as Kōtari Station (神足駅, Kōtari-eki) on 1 August 1931 by virtue of local villagers’ eager petitions to the Railway Ministry. The station was named after the village (Shin-Kōtari). On 1 September 1995, the station was renamed Nagaokakyō, the present city name.

Station numbering was introduced to the station in March 2018 with Nagaokakyō being assigned station number JR-A35.

== Environs ==
The headquarters of Murata Manufacturing are just east of the station. Nagaoka-Tenjin Station of Hankyu Kyoto Line is located about 1 km west of the station.

In front of the east exit of the station, a miniature of bullet-marked chimney is standing. This is a monument of an attack by an enemy carrier-based aircraft to Kōtari area on July 19, 1945, which killed one and injured others.

== Adjacent stations ==
«	Service	»
JR Kyoto Line
Mukōmachi	Local (Including rapid service after the morning)	Yamazaki
Kyoto	Rapid Service (in the morning)	Takatsuki
Special Rapid Service: Does not stop at this station
Limited Express "Hida": Does not stop at this station
Limited Express "Kuroshio": Does not stop at this station

== See also ==
- List of railway stations in Japan
