= Nagaokakyō =

Nagaokakyō 長岡京市
- City
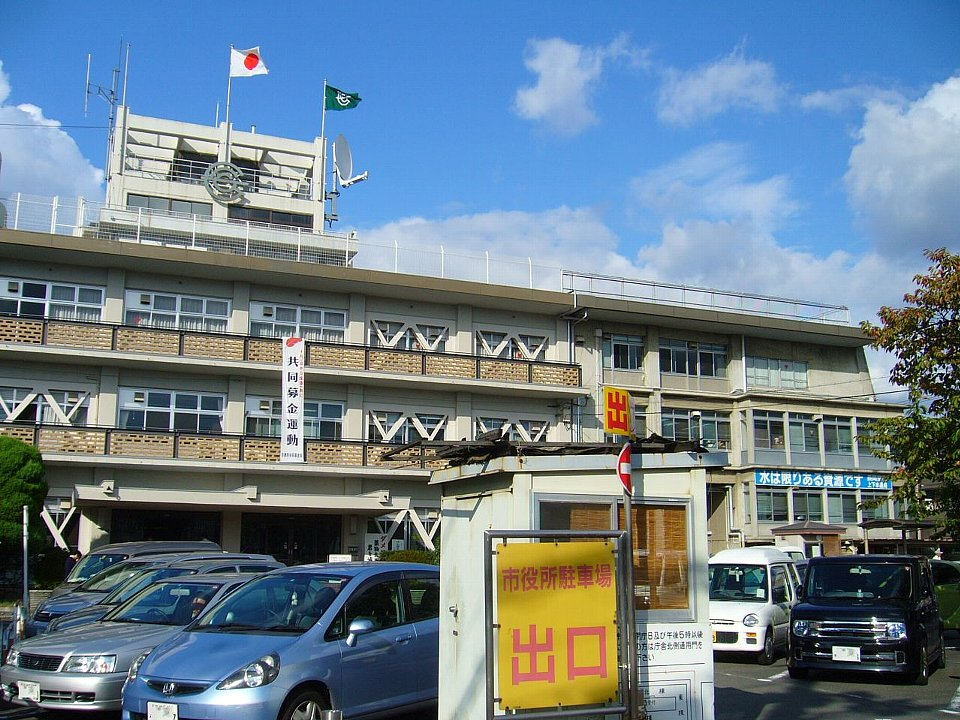
- Nagaokakyō City Hall

- Flag Seal
- /0/queryThe property query is required; /0/idsThe property ids is required; /0Failed to match at least one schema; /0/titleThe property title is required; /0/serviceDoes not have a value in the enumeration ["page"]; /0Failed to match exactly one schema; /0/geometriesThe property geometries is required; /0/typeDoes not have a value in the enumeration ["GeometryCollection"]; /0/typeDoes not have a value in the enumeration ["MultiPolygon"]; /0/typeDoes not have a value in the enumeration ["Point"]; /0/typeDoes not have a value in the enumeration ["MultiPoint"]; /0/typeDoes not have a value in the enumeration ["LineString"]; /0/typeDoes not have a value in the enumeration ["MultiLineString"]; /0/typeDoes not have a value in the enumeration ["Polygon"]; /0/coordinatesThe property coordinates is required; /0/geometryThe property geometry is required; /0/typeDoes not have a value in the enumeration ["Feature"]; /0/featuresThe property features is required; /0/typeDoes not have a value in the enumeration ["FeatureCollection"]; Location of Nagaokakyō in Kyoto Prefecture

- Location in Japan
- Coordinates: 34°55′37″N 135°41′45″E
- Country: Japan
- Region: Kansai
- Prefecture: Kyoto

Government
  - Mayor: Kengo Nakakoji (since January 2015)

Area
  - Total: 19.17 km^{2} (7.40 sq mi)

Population (September 1, 2023)
  - Total: 82,279
  - Density: 4,292/km^{2} (11,120/sq mi)
- Time zone: UTC+09:00 (JST)
- City hall address: 1-1-1 Kaida, Nagaokakyō-shi, Kyoto-fu 617-8501
- Website: Official website
- Symbols
- Bird: Japanese white-eye
- Flower: Ericaceae
- Tree: Maple

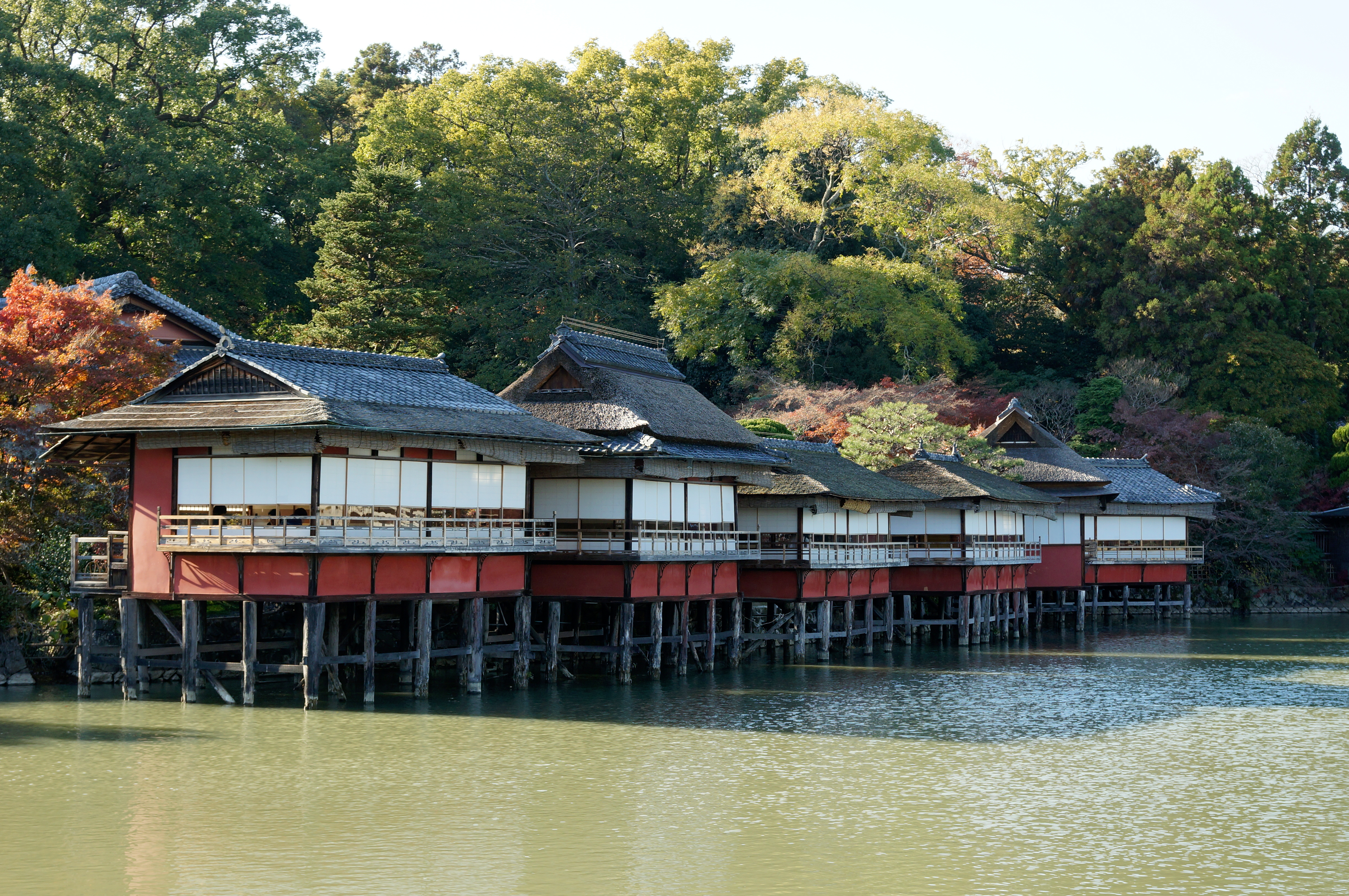
Nagaoka Tenman-gū

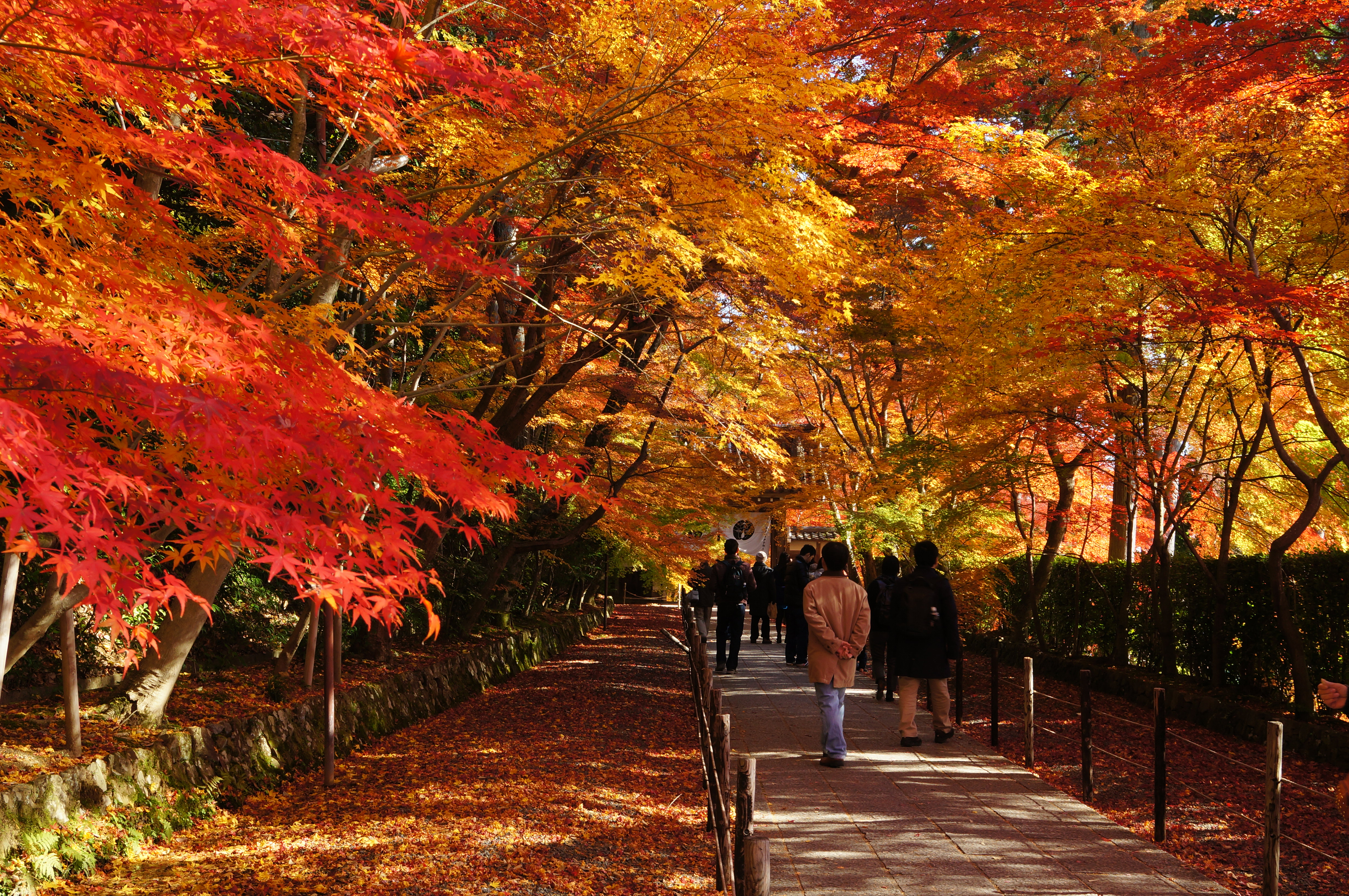
Komyo-ji temple

Nagaokakyō (長岡京市, Nagaokakyō-shi) is a city located in Kyoto Prefecture, Japan. As of 1 September 2023, the city has an estimated population of 82,279 in 37718 households and a population density of 4700 persons per km^{2}. The total area of the city is 19.17 square kilometres (7.40 sq mi).

== Geography ==
Nagaokakyō is located in southwestern Kyoto Prefecture. The Obata River and Koizumi River flow through the city. The topography is low from the northwest to the southwest. The area is noted for its bamboo forests.

=== Neighboring municipalities ===
Kyoto Prefecture

- Kyoto
- Mukō
- Otokuni District (Ōyamazaki)

Osaka Prefecture

- Mishima District (Shimamoto)

=== Climate ===
Nagaokakyō has a humid subtropical climate (Köppen Cfa) characterized by warm summers and cool winters with light to no snowfall. The average annual temperature in Nagaokakyō is 14.5 °C. The average annual rainfall is 1677 mm with September as the wettest month. The temperatures are highest on average in August, at around 26.5 °C, and lowest in January, at around 3.1 °C.

== Demographics ==
Per Japanese census data, the population of Nagaokakyō has increased slightly in recent decades.

Historical population
Year	Pop.	±%
1940	8,090	—
1950	10,614	+31.2%
1960	15,050	+41.8%
1970	51,414	+241.6%
1980	71,445	+39.0%
1990	77,191	+8.0%
2000	77,846	+0.8%
2010	79,850	+2.6%
2020	80,608	+0.9%

== History ==
The area of Nagaokakyō was part of ancient Yamashiro Province. The legendary Kofun period Emperor Keitai's Prince Otokuni, constructed a palace in this location in 518 AD. In 784 AD, Emperor Kammu transferred the capital of Japan from Heijō-kyō to the Nagaoka-kyō Palace; however, the palace was not actually located in modern Nagaokakyō, but in the adjacent city of Mukō .

The villages of Otokuni, Kaiin-ji and Shinkotari in Otokuni District, Kyoto were established on April 1, 1889, with the creation of the modern municipalities system. These villages merged on April 1, 1949, to form the town of Nagaoka, which was elevated to city status on October 1, 1972, taking the name of Nagaoka-kyō.

== Government ==
Nagaokakyō has a mayor-council form of government with a directly elected mayor and a unicameral city council of 22 members. Nagaokakyō, collectively with Ōyamazaki contributes two members to the Kyoto Prefectural Assembly. In terms of national politics, the city is part of the Kyoto 3rd district of the lower house of the Diet of Japan.

== Economy ==
Nagaokakyō has a mixed economy based on commerce and light manufacturing. Murata Manufacturing and Mitsubishi Logisnext are based in Nagaokakyō. The city is also a commuter town for the neighboring cities of Kyoto and Osaka.

== Education ==
Nagaokakyō has ten public elementary schools and four public junior high schools operated by city government and two public high schools operated by the Kyoto Prefectural Board of Education. There is also one private junior high school and one private high school. The prefecture also operates one special education school for the handicapped. The Kyoto Seizan College is a private junior college located in Nagaokakyō.

== Transportation ==
=== Railways ===
JR West - Tōkaidō Main Line (JR Kyoto Line)

- Nagaokakyō

Hankyu - Kyoto Main Line

- Nishiyama Tennozan - Nagaoka-Tenjin

=== Highways ===
- Kyoto Jūkan Expressway
- National Route 171
- National Route 478

== Sister cities ==
- Arlington, Massachusetts, United States, sister city since 1984
- (China) Ningbo, Zhejiang, friendship city since 1983

== Local attractions ==
- Igenoyama Kofun, National Historic Site
- Shōryūji Castle

=== Culture ===
The most popular event in Nagaokakyo is the Garasha Festival, usually held in November, in honor Hosokawa Gracia. The Garasha Festival is held at both the Nagaokakyo Cultural Center and Shoryuji Castle, while the parade runs throughout the city. Many of the parade participants wear various period's traditional clothing, including the chosen 'Garasha' of the year.

== Notable people from Nagaokakyō ==
- Ayumi Kaihori, former soccer player (Japan women's national football team)
- Hiroshi Otsuki, former football player and manager
- Masaaki Sakata, former rugby union player
- Aya Shimokozuru, former soccer player (Japan women's national football team)
- Miho Takahashi, swimmer
- Takashi Usami, soccer player (Gamba Osaka, J1 League)
- Shohei Yamamoto, former soccer player
- Kenjiro Yamashita, member of J-pop boygroups Exile and Sandaime J Soul Brothers and a former member of Gekidan Exile.

== See also ==
- 2005 Nagaokakyō city assembly election
- Capital of Japan
