= Higashi-Mukō Station =

Railway station in Mukō, Kyoto Prefecture, Japan

Higashi-Mukō Station 東向日駅
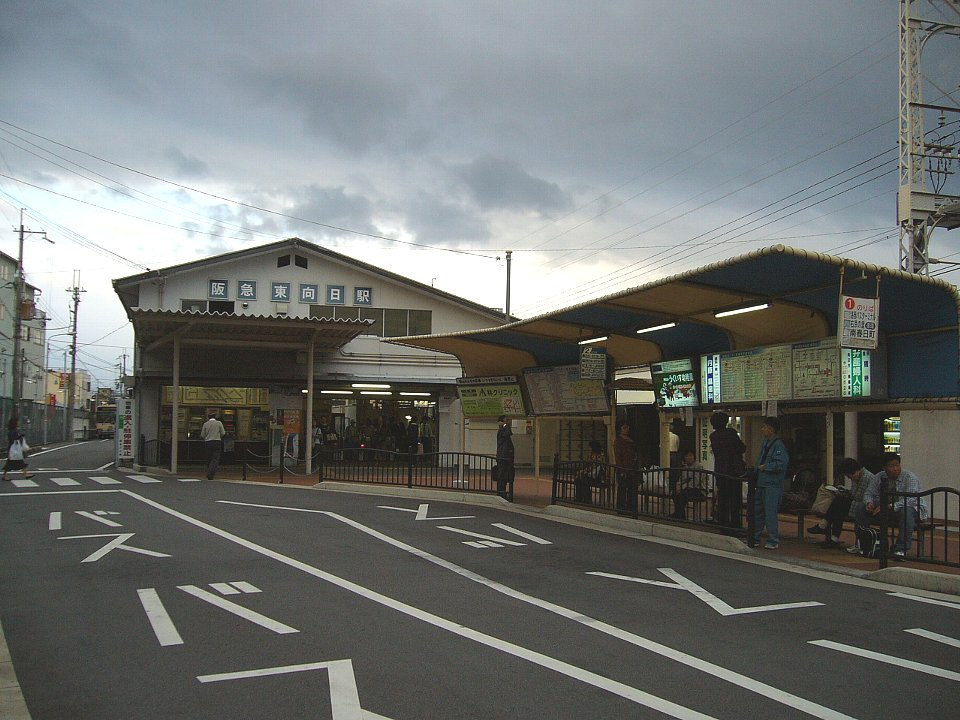
- Station building behind bus terminal

General information
- Location: Kotsukuda Teradochō, Mukō-shi Kyoto-fu 617-0002; Japan
- Coordinates: 34°57′11.62″N 135°42′16.64″E
- Operator: Hankyu Railway.
- Line: ■ Hankyu Kyoto Line
- Distance: 35.0 km (21.7 miles) from Jūsō
- Platforms: 2 side platforms
- Connections: Bus terminal

Construction
- Accessible: yes

Other information
- Status: Staffed
- Station code: HK-79
- Website: Official website

History
- Opened: 1 November 1928
- Former names: Higashi-Mukōmachi (until 1972)

Passengers
- 2019: 16,128 (daily)
Location
- Location within Osaka Prefecture Location within Japan

Higashi-Mukō Station (東向日駅, Higashi-Mukō-eki) is a passenger railway station located in the city of Mukō, Kyoto Prefecture, Japan. It is operated by the private transportation company, Hankyu Railway.

== Lines ==
Higashi-Mukō Station is served by the Hankyu Kyoto Line, and is located 35.0 kilometers from the terminus of the line at Jūsō and 37.4 kilometers from Osaka-umeda.

== Layout ==
The station has two side platforms serving two tracks. The platforms are connected each other by an underground passage, which are accessible with slopes elevators. A bus terminal is located outside the East Exit at the south end of Kawaramachi-bound platform. The West Exit is at the south end of Umeda-bound platform.

== Adjacent stations ==
| « | Service | » |
Hankyu Kyoto Line
Commutation Limited Express: Does not stop at this station
Limited Express: Does not stop at this station
Semi limited Express: Does not stop at this station
Express: Does not stop at this station
| Nishi-Mukō | Semi-Express | Rakusaiguchi |
| Nishi-Mukō | Local | Rakusaiguchi |

== History ==
The station opened as Higashi-Mukōmachi Station on 1 November 1928, the day the Shinkeihan Line (present-day Hankyu Kyoto Main Line) was extended from Takatsuki-machi to Kyoto Saiin. On 1 October 1972 when the town of Mukō (Mukō-machi in Japanese) became a city (Mukō-shi in Japanese), the station name was changed to the current one.

Station numbering was introduced to all Hankyu stations on 21 December 2013 with this station being designated as station number HK-79.

== Passenger statistics ==
In fiscal 2019, the station was used by an average of 16,128 passengers daily

== Surrounding area ==
- Mukomachi Station
- Muko City Hall
- Muko City Cultural Museum

== See also ==
- List of railway stations in Japan
