= Nagaoka-Tenjin Station =

Railway station in Nagaokakyō, Kyoto Prefecture, Japan

Nagaoka-Tenjin Station 長岡天神駅
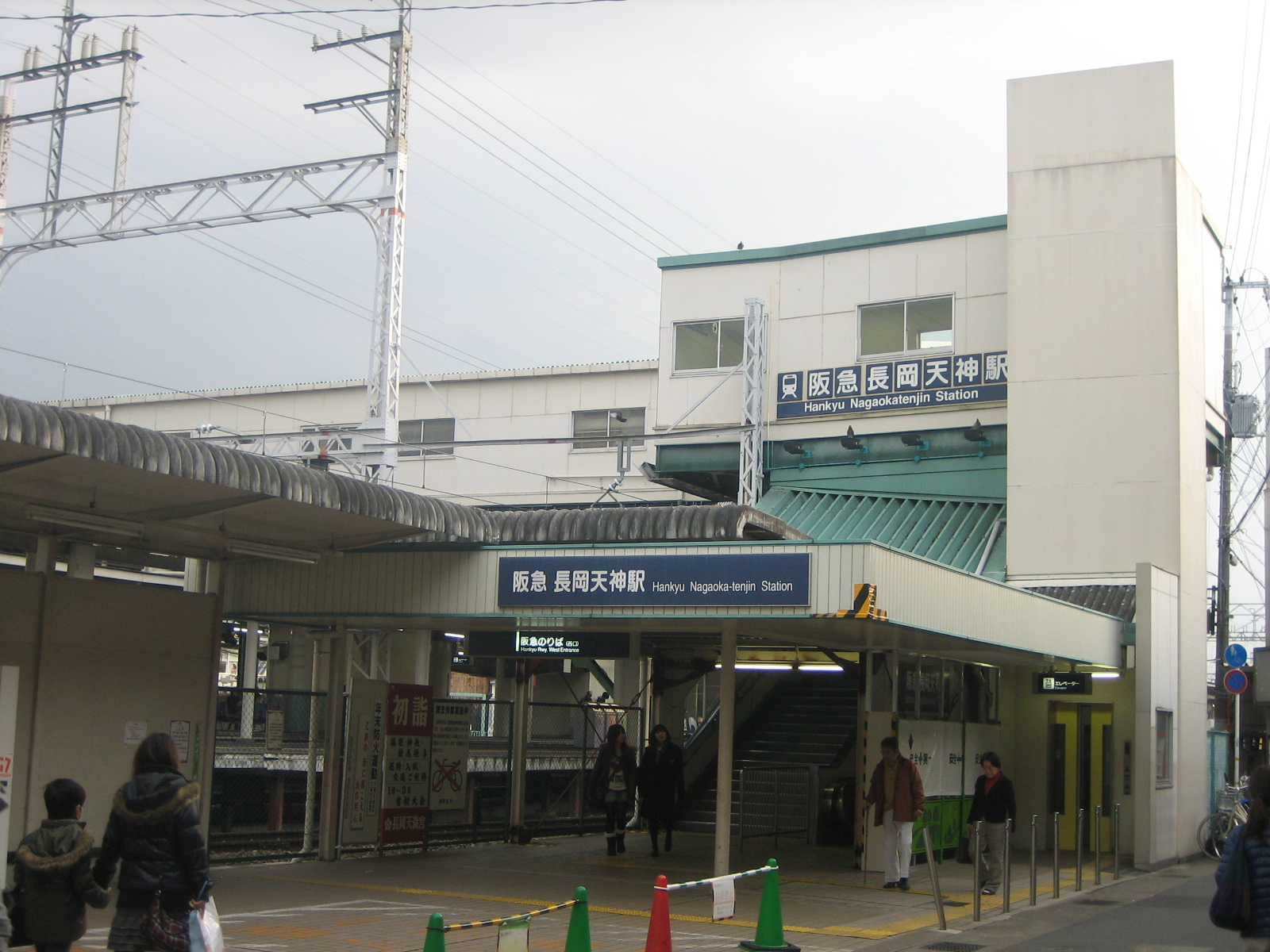
- Nagaoka-Tenjin Station

General information
- Location: 1-chōme-30 Tenjin, Nagaokakyo-shi, Kyoto-fu 617-0824; Japan
- Coordinates: 34°55′31″N 135°41′34″E
- Operator: Hankyu Railway.
- Line: ■ Hankyu Kyoto Line
- Distance: 31.7 km (19.7 miles) from Jūsō
- Platforms: 2 Island platforms
- Tracks: 4

Construction
- Structure type: Elevated
- Accessible: Yes

Other information
- Status: Staffed
- Station code: HK-77
- Website: Official website

History
- Opened: November 1, 1928

Passengers
- FY2019: 30,708 daily

Services
Hankyu Kyoto Line (HK-77)
Nishiyama Tennozan (HK-76)	Local	Nishi-Mukō (HK-78)
Nishiyama Tennozan (HK-76)	Semi-Express	Nishi-Mukō (HK-78)
Takatsuki-shi (HK-72)	Express	Katsura (HK-81)
Takatsuki-shi (HK-72)	Semi limited Express	Katsura (HK-81)
Takatsuki-shi (HK-72)	Limited Express	Katsura (HK-81)
Takatsuki-shi (HK-72)	Commuter Limited Express	Katsura (HK-81)
Rapid Limited Express "Kyo-Train", "Sagano", "Atago", "Togetsu", "Hozu": Does not stop at this station
Location
- Location within Osaka Prefecture Location within Japan

Nagaoka-Tenjin Station (長岡天神駅, Nagaoka-Tenjin-eki) is a passenger railway station located in the city of Nagaokakyō, Kyoto Prefecture, Japan. It is operated by the private transportation company, Hankyu Railway.

== Lines ==
Nagaoka-Tenjin Station is served by the Hankyu Kyoto Line, and is located 31.7 kilometers from the terminus of the line at Jūsō and 34.1 kilometers from Osaka-umeda.

== Layout ==
This station has two island platforms serving 4 tracks on the ground, connected by an elevated station building. Ticket gates are located in the building above the tracks.

=== Tracks ===
1, 2	■ Kyoto Line	for Kawaramachi and Arashiyama
3, 4	■ Kyoto Line	for Osaka (Umeda), Tengachaya, Kita-Senri, Kobe and Takarazuka

== Usage ==
In fiscal 2007, about 6,769,000 passengers started travel from this station annually.

== History ==
Nagaoka-Tenjin Station opened on 1 November 1928.

Station numbering was introduced to all Hankyu stations on 21 December 2013 with this station being designated as station number HK-77.

== Passenger statistics ==
In fiscal 2019, the station was used by an average of 30,708 passengers daily

== Surrounding area ==
- Nagaoka Tenmangu Shrine
- Nagaokakyo City Hall
- Nagaokakyo City Library

== See also ==
- List of railway stations in Japan
