= Nishi-Mukō Station =

Railway station in Mukō, Kyoto Prefecture, Japan

Nishi-Mukō Station 西向日駅
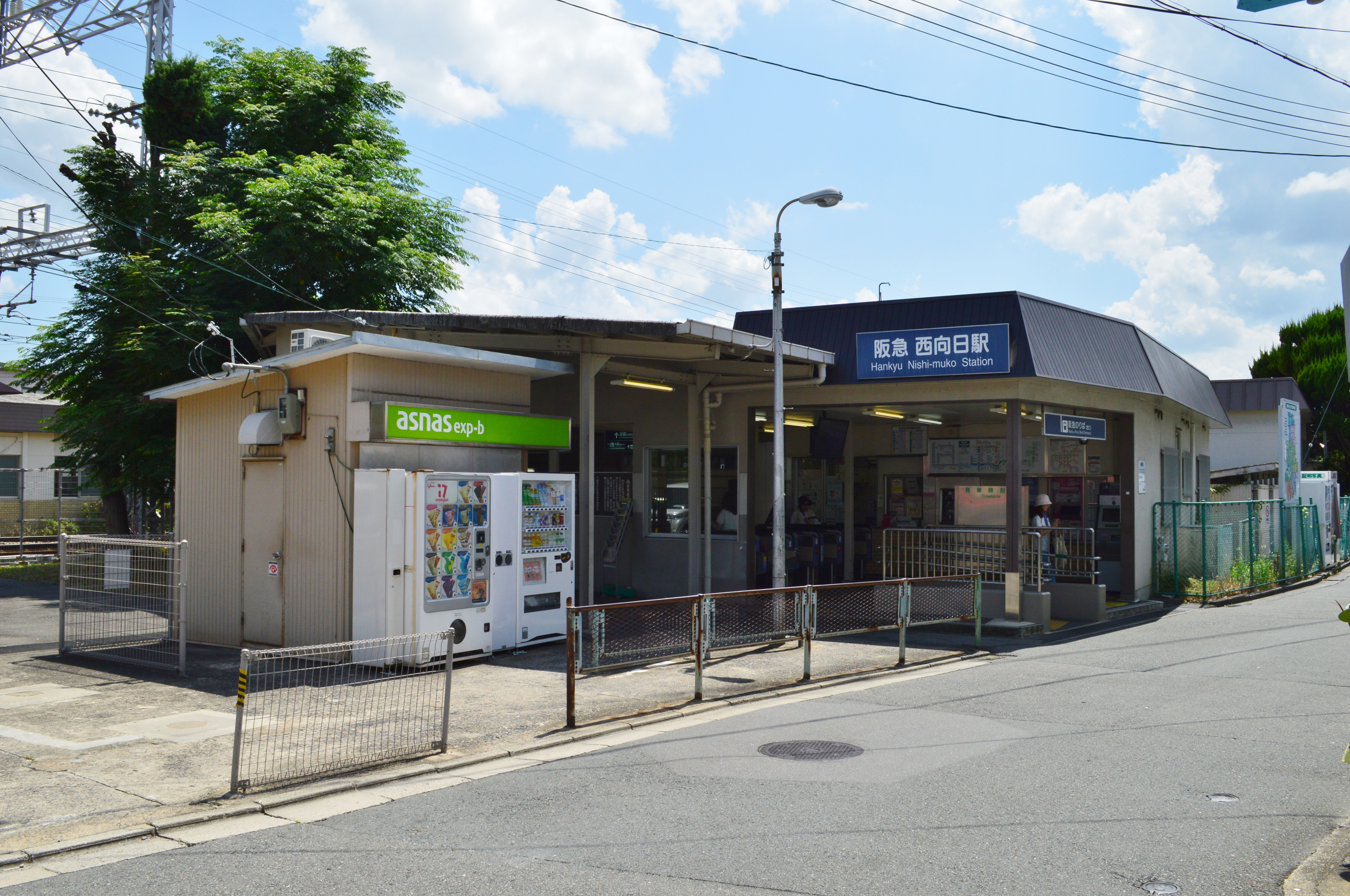
- Nishi-Mukō Station building, August 2017

General information
- Location: Minamibiraki Kamiuenocho, Mukō-shi, Kyoto-fu 617-0006; Japan
- Coordinates: 34°56′25.31″N 135°42′10.74″E
- Operator: Hankyu Railway.
- Line: ■ Hankyu Kyoto Line
- Distance: 33.6 km (20.9 miles) from Jūsō
- Platforms: 2 side platforms
- Tracks: 2

Other information
- Status: Staffed
- Station code: HK-78
- Website: Official website

History
- Opened: November 1, 1928
- Former names: Nishi-Mukōmachi (until 1972)

Passengers
- FY2019: 12,493 daily
Location
- Location within Osaka Prefecture Location within Japan

Nishi-Mukō Station (西向日駅, Nishi-Mukō-eki) is a passenger railway station located in the city of Mukō, Kyoto Prefecture, Japan. It is operated by the private railway operator Hankyu Railway.

== Lines ==
Nishi-Mukō Station is served by the Hankyu Kyoto Line, and is located 33.6 kilometers from the terminus of the line at Jūsō and 36.0 kilometers from Osaka-umeda.

== Layout ==
The station has two side platforms serving two tracks, connected by an underground passage. This underground passage also functions as a general road connecting both sides of the station, and a partition in the center of the road separates the inside and outside of the station.

== History ==
The station opened as Nishi-Mukōmachi Station on November 1, 1928, the day the Shinkeihan Line (present-day Hankyu Kyoto Main Line) was extended from Takatsuki-machi to Kyoto Saiin. On October 1, 1972, when the town of Mukō (Mukō-machi in Japanese) became a city (Mukō-shi in Japanese), the station name was changed to the current one.

In 1978 when the underground passage of the station was constructed, an archaeological excavation at the station found some ruins of Nagaoka-kyō, the capital city of Japan from 784 to 794, and earlier period.

Station numbering was introduced to all Hankyu stations on 21 December 2013 with this station being designated as station number HK-78.

== Passenger statistics ==
In fiscal 2019, the station was used by an average of 12,493 passengers daily

== Surrounding area ==
«	Service	»
Hankyu Kyoto Line
Commutation Limited Express: Does not stop at this station
Limited Express: Does not stop at this station
Semi limited Express: Does not stop at this station
Express: Does not stop at this station
Nagaoka-Tenjin	Semi-Express	Higashi-Mukō
Nagaoka-Tenjin	Local	Higashi-Mukō

== See also ==
- List of railway stations in Japan
