= Mukō =

Mukō 向日市
- City
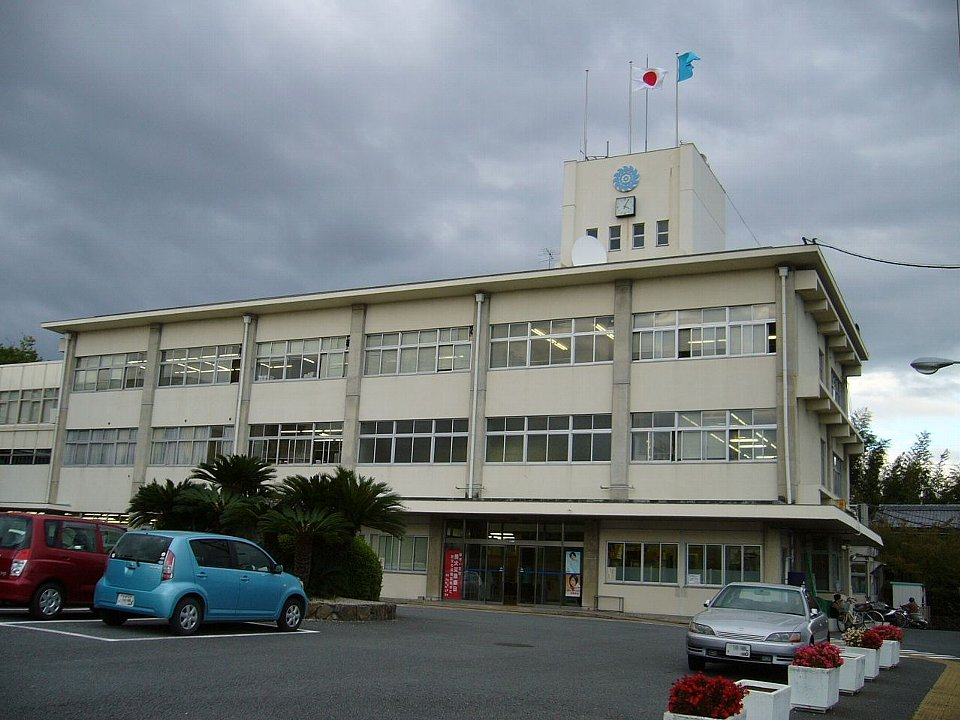
- Mukō City Hall

- Flag Emblem
- Location of Mukō in Kyoto Prefecture

- Location in Japan
- Coordinates: 34°56′55″N 135°41′54″E
- Country: Japan
- Region: Kansai
- Prefecture: Kyoto

Government
  - Mayor: Mamoru Yasuda

Area
  - Total: 7.72 km^{2} (2.98 sq mi)

Population (September 1, 2023)
  - Total: 56,070
  - Density: 7,260/km^{2} (18,800/sq mi)
- Time zone: UTC+09:00 (JST)
- City hall address: 20, Nakano, Terada-cho, Muko-shi, Kyoto-fu 617-0002
- Website: Official website
- Symbols
- Flower: Sunflower, Azalea
- Tree: Sakura, Bamboo

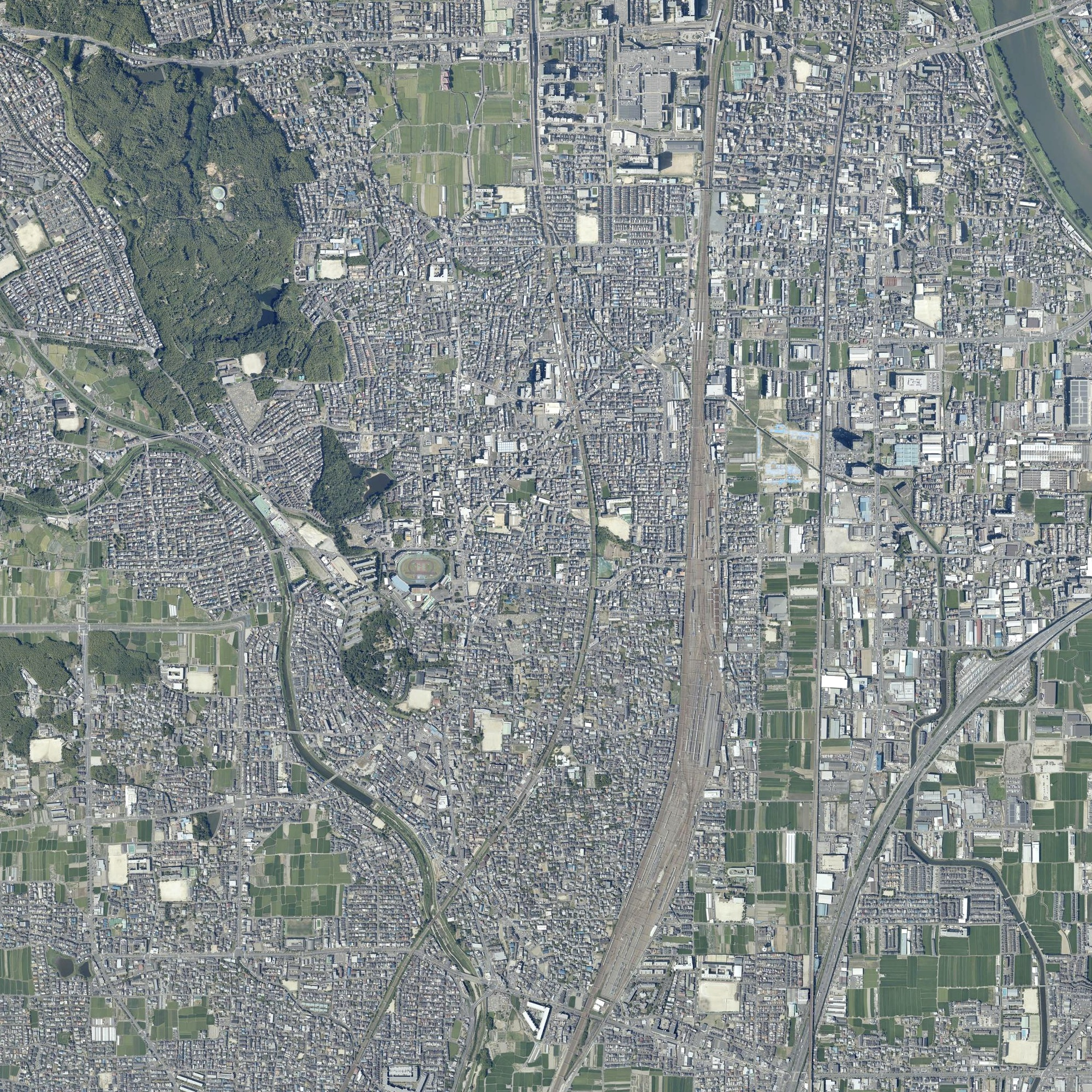
Mukō, 2020 aerial photography

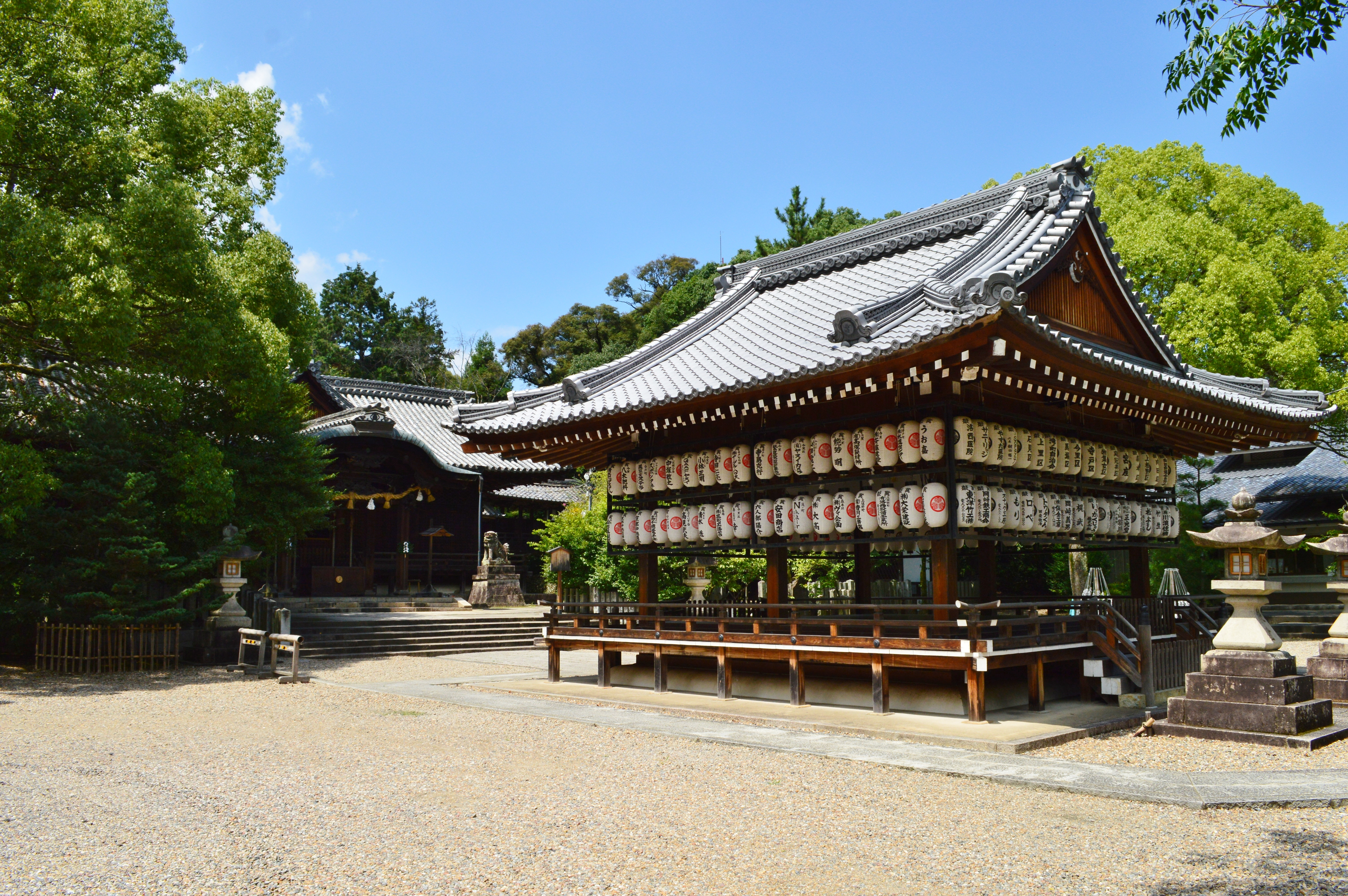
Mukō Jinja

Mukō (向日市, Mukō-shi) is a city in Kyoto Prefecture, Japan. As of 1 September 2023, the city has an estimated population of 56,070 in 23,748 households and a population density of 2200 persons per km^{2}. The total area of the city is 7.72 square kilometres (2.98 sq mi).

== Geography ==
Mukō is located in southern Kyoto Prefecture. It is located at the southwestern edge of the Kyoto Basin, with views of the Nishiyama mountain range including Mt. Koshio to the west, and the Katsura River flowing to the east of the city. As a result, the terrain is generally flat with highlands to the northwest and lowlands to the southwest. Muko adjoins northern Nagaoka, is surrounded by Kyoto on other three sides. There are bamboo groves found on the hillside on the west of the city. Residential area for Kyoto and Osaka is expanded to the hill, encroaches on bamboo groves. The Itsuka Kofun, the large keyhole-shaped kofun dated to 4th century, is located in the center of the hill chain.

=== Neighboring municipalities ===
Kyoto Prefecture

- Kyoto
- Nagaokakyō

=== Climate ===
Mukō has a humid subtropical climate (Köppen Cfa) characterized by warm summers and cool winters with light to no snowfall. The average annual temperature in Mukō is 14.5 °C. The average annual rainfall is 1667 mm with September as the wettest month. The temperatures are highest on average in August, at around 26.5 °C, and lowest in January, at around 3.1 °C.

== Demographics ==
Per Japanese census data, the population of Mukō saw rapid growth in the late 20th century as the city developed as a residential community, and it has grown at a slower pace since then. According to the provisional results of the 2015 national census of Japan, the population of Muko is 56,859; of which male and female are 27,119 and 29,740 respectively.

Historical population
Year	Pop.	±%
1886	3,528	—
1920	4,712	+33.6%
1925	5,188	+10.1%
1930	5,959	+14.9%
1940	8,072	+35.5%
1950	9,243	+14.5%
1960	12,734	+37.8%
1970	36,988	+190.5%
1980	50,604	+36.8%
1990	52,928	+4.6%
2000	53,425	+0.9%
2010	54,328	+1.7%
2020	56,859	+4.7%

== History ==
The area of Mukō was part of ancient Yamashiro Province. At the end of the 8th century, Emperor Kanmu moved his capital from Heijō-kyō to Nagaoka-kyō. The new capital encompassed a large part of modern Muko, where research has revealed the palace to have been located. In the south, it also included parts of Nagaokakyō. In 794, because of the location's humid climate and reputation as a breeding ground for disease, Kammu relocated his capital from Nagaoka to Heian-kyō, now known as Kyoto. Mukō developed as a market town in 1592, during Azuchi–Momoyama period. The town's main road, called Saigoku Kaido, flourished because it connected Tō-ji in Kyoto and Nishinomiya Shrine in Settsu Province. Saigoku Kaido, which still presents a traditional and historical setting, changed name National Route 171 as important road.

=== Modern Mukō ===
The town of Mukō was established on April 1, 1889, with the creation of the modern municipalities system. Mukōmachi Station opened on July 26, 1876. Higashi-Mukō Station and Nishi-Mukō Station opened on December 1, 1928. Mukō was elevated to city status on October 1, 1972.

== Government ==
Mukō has a mayor-council form of government with a directly elected mayor and a unicameral city council of 18 members. Mukō, collectively with Nagaokakyō, contributes two members to the Kyoto Prefectural Assembly. In terms of national politics, the city is part of the Kyoto 3rd district of the lower house of the Diet of Japan.

- 2007 Mukō city assembly election

== Economy ==
Mukō has a mixed economy based on commerce and light manufacturing.

- Mukomachi Saty Center is a six-level shopping center with car parking located approximately 170 metres (a three-minute walk) from Higashi Muko station on Hankyu Kyoto line and 630 metres (an eight-minute walk) from JR Mukomachi station.

There is an Aeon Department Store, a Japanese restaurant and a casual dining area. A specialty tea stand on the first floor sells a variety of tea from around Japan.

== Education ==
Mukō has six public elementary schools and three public junior high schools operated by city government and one public high school operated by the Kyoto Prefectural Board of Education. There is also one private elementary school and one private high school.

== Transportation ==
=== Railways ===
JR West - Tōkaidō Main Line (JR Kyoto Line)

- Mukōmachi

Hankyu - Kyoto Main Line

- Nishi-Mukō - Higashi-Mukō

=== Highways ===
- National Route 171

== Sister cities ==
- Saratoga, California, United States, sister city since 1983
- Hangzhou, Zhejiang, China
