= Sōjiji Station =

Railway station in Ibaraki, Osaka Prefecture, Japan

Sōjiji Station 総持寺駅
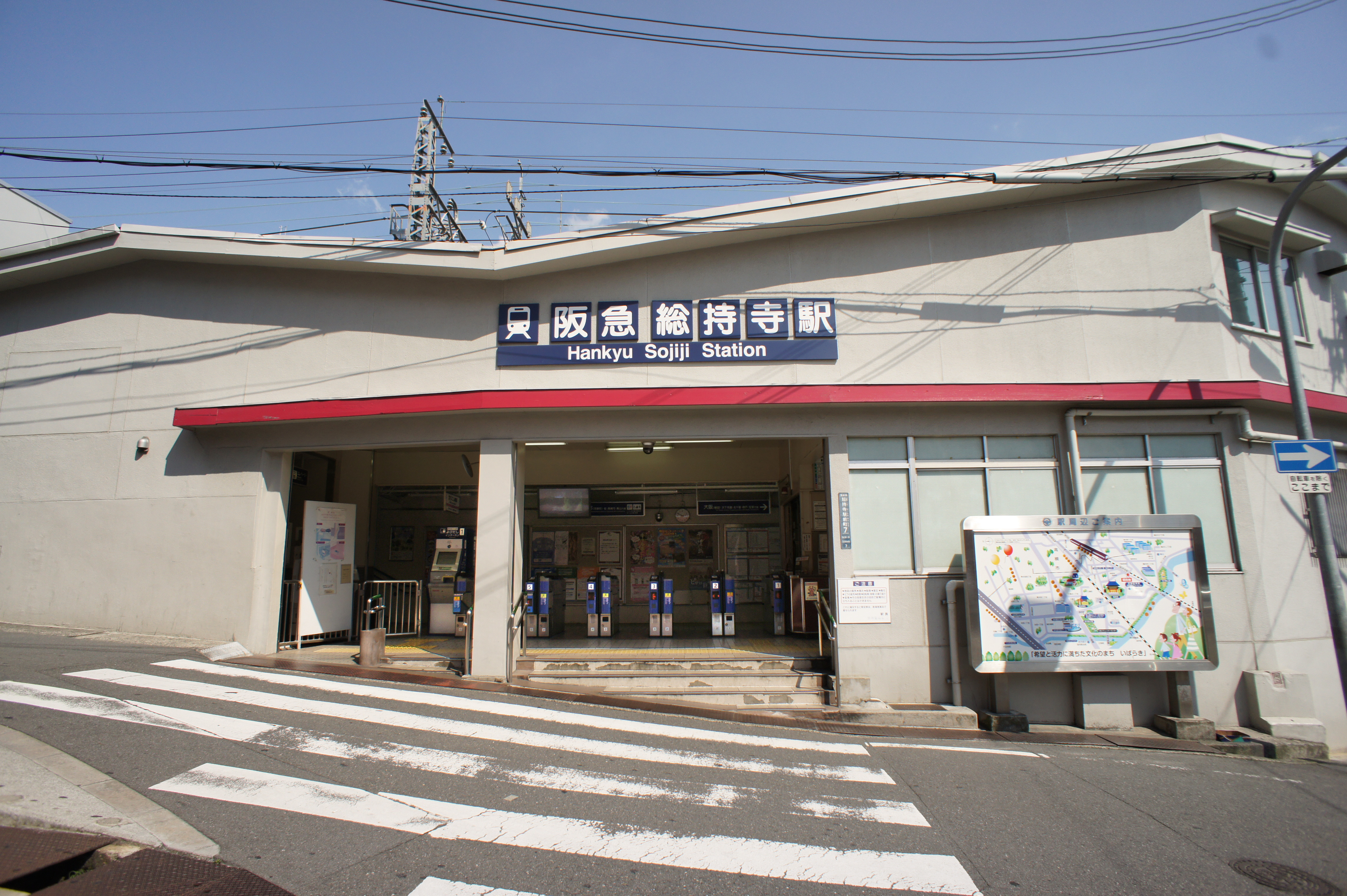
- Sōjiji Station west entrance in 2012

General information
- Location: 7 Sōjijiekimaechō, Ibaraki-shi, Osaka-fu 567-0802
- Coordinates: 34°49′36.33″N 135°35′3.5″E
- Operator: Hankyu Railway.
- Line: ■ Hankyu Kyoto Line
- Distance: 16.2 km (10.1 miles) from Jūsō
- Platforms: 2 side platforms
- Tracks: 2

Other information
- Status: Staffed
- Station code: HK-70
- Website: Official website

History
- Opened: April 15, 1936

Passengers
- FY2019: 16,634 daily
Location
- Location within Osaka Prefecture Location within Japan

Sōjiji Station (総持寺駅, Sōjiji-eki; station number: HK-70) is a passenger railway station located in the city of Ibaraki, Osaka Prefecture, Japan. It is operated by the private transportation company Hankyu Railway.

== Lines ==
Sōjiji Station is served by the Hankyu Kyoto Line, and is located 16.2 kilometers from the terminus of the line at Jūsō and 18.6 kilometers from Osaka-umeda.

== Layout ==
The station consists of two opposed side platforms. Because it is on a slope, the Awaji side of the platform is on an embankment. The west ticket gate is on the lower level than the platform, near the Awaji side of the inbound (Kyoto Kawaramachi direction) platform. There is also an east ticket gate on the platform side of the outbound train (towards Osaka-Umeda), but there is no automatic ticket vending machine.

=== Platforms ===
1	■ Kyoto Line	for Kyoto (Kawaramachi) and Arashiyama
2	■ Kyoto Line	for Umeda, Tengachaya, Kita-Senri, Kobe, Takarazuka, Takatsuki-shi and Minoo

== Adjacent stations ==
«	Service	»
Hankyu Kyoto Main Line
Ibaraki-shi	Local	Tonda
Others: Does not stop at this station

== History ==
Sojiji station opened on 15 April 1936.

Station numbering was introduced to all Hankyu stations on 21 December 2013 with this station being designated as station number HK-70.

== Passenger statistics ==
In fiscal 2019, the station was used by an average of 16,634 passengers daily

== Surrounding area ==
- Settsu-Tonda Station
- Osaka Prefectural Takatsuki Support School
- Takatsuki Municipal Tomita Elementary School

== See also ==
- List of railway stations in Japan
