= Tonda Station =

Railway station in Takatsuki, Osaka Prefecture, Japan

Tonda Station 富田駅
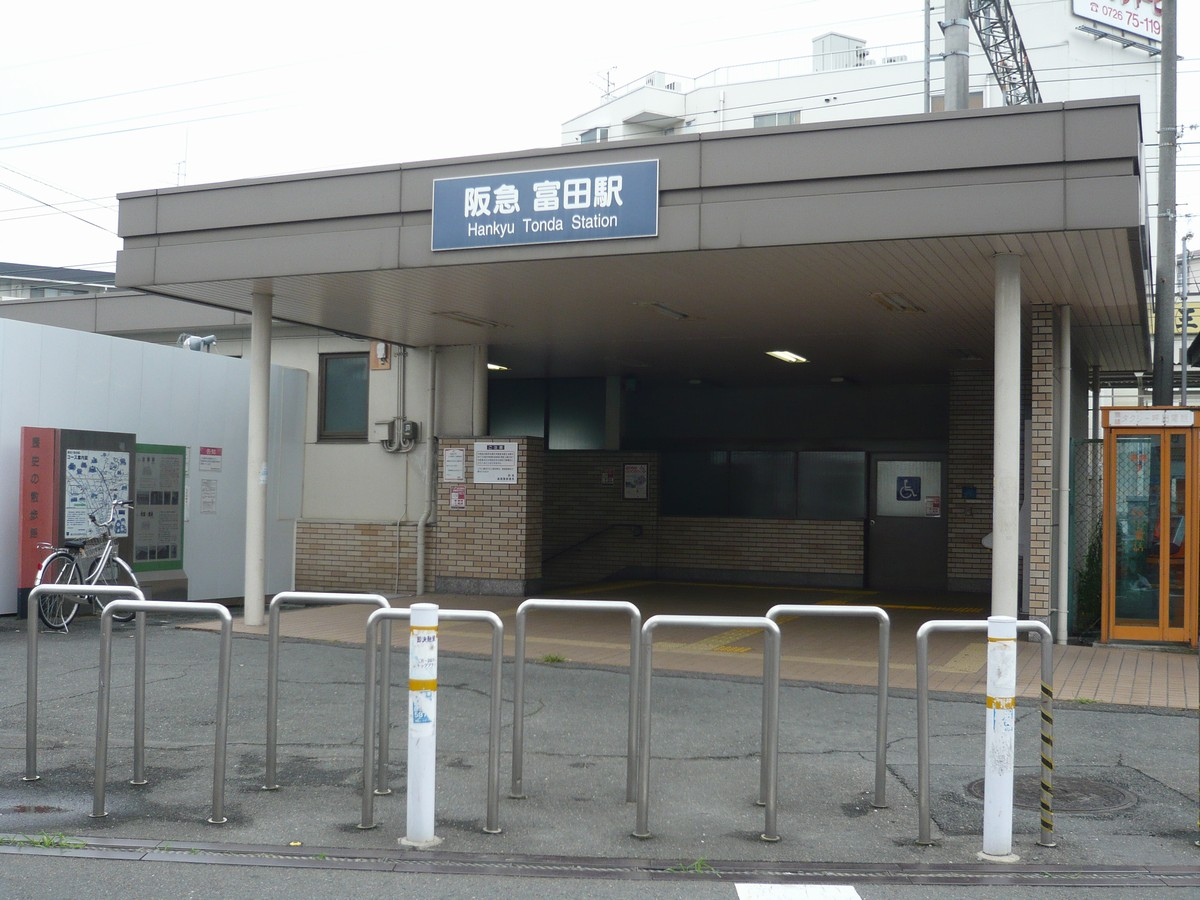
- Tonda Station entrance

General information
- Location: 1-chōme-28 Tondachō, Takatsuki-shi, Osaka-fu 569-0814
- Coordinates: 34°50′7.09″N 135°35′35.19″E
- Operator: Hankyu Railway.
- Line: ■ Hankyu Kyoto Line
- Distance: 17.3 km (10.7 miles) from Jūsō
- Platforms: 2 side platforms
- Tracks: 2

Other information
- Status: Staffed
- Station code: HK-71
- Website: Official website

History
- Opened: January 16, 1928
- Former names: Tondamachi (to 1957)

Passengers
- FY2019: 20,365 daily
Location
- Location within Osaka Prefecture Location within Japan

Tonda Station (富田駅, Tonda-eki; station number: HK-71) is a passenger railway station located in the city of Takatsuki, Osaka Prefecture, Japan. It is operated by the private transportation company Hankyu Railway.

== Lines ==
Tonda Station is served by the Hankyu Kyoto Line, and is located 17.3 kilometers from the terminus of the line at Jūsō and 19.7 kilometers from Osaka-umeda.

== Layout ==
The station consists of two opposed side platforms, serving three tracks, with one inbound passing track between the opposing platforms. The platforms are connected by an underground station building.

=== Platforms ===
| 1 | ■ Kyoto Line | for Takatsuki-shi, Kyoto-kawaramachi and Arashiyama |
| 3 | ■ Kyoto Line | for Ibaraki-shi, Awaji, Osaka-umeda and Tengachaya |

== Adjacent stations ==
| « | Service | » |
Hankyu Kyoto Main Line
| Sōjiji | Local | Takatsuki-shi |
Others: Does not stop at this station

== History ==
Tonda station opened on 16 January 1928 as Tondamachi Station (富田町駅). It was renamed on 1 July 1957.

Station numbering was introduced to all Hankyu stations on 21 December 2013 with this station being designated as station number HK-71.

== Passenger statistics ==
In fiscal 2019, the station was used by an average of 20,356 passengers daily

== Surrounding area ==
- Settsu-Tonda Station
- Osaka Prefectural Takatsuki Support School
- Takatsuki Municipal Tomita Elementary School

== See also ==
- List of railway stations in Japan
