= Nakatsu (disambiguation) =

Nakatsu is a city in Ōita Prefecture, Japan.

Nakatsu may also refer to:

- Nakatsu, Wakayama, a former village in Hidaka District, Wakayama Prefecture, Japan
- Nakatsu Station (disambiguation), multiple railway stations in Japan
- Nakatsu River, a river of Iwate Prefecture, Japan
- Nakatsu Domain, a former Japanese domain

== People with the surname ==
- Mari Nakatsu (中津 真莉, born 1983), Japanese voice actress and actress
