= Nakatsu Station =

Nakatsu Station refers to the following railway stations in Japan:

- Nakatsu Station (Ōita) in Nakatsu, Oita, on the Nippo Main Line
- Nakatsu Station (Hankyu) in Kita-ku, Osaka, on the Hankyu Kobe Line and the Hankyu Takarazuka Line
- Nakatsu Station (Osaka Metro) in Kita-ku, Osaka, on the Osaka Metro Midosuji Line
