= Ibaraki-shi Station =

Railway station in Ibaraki, Osaka Prefecture, Japan

Ibaraki-shi Station 茨木市駅
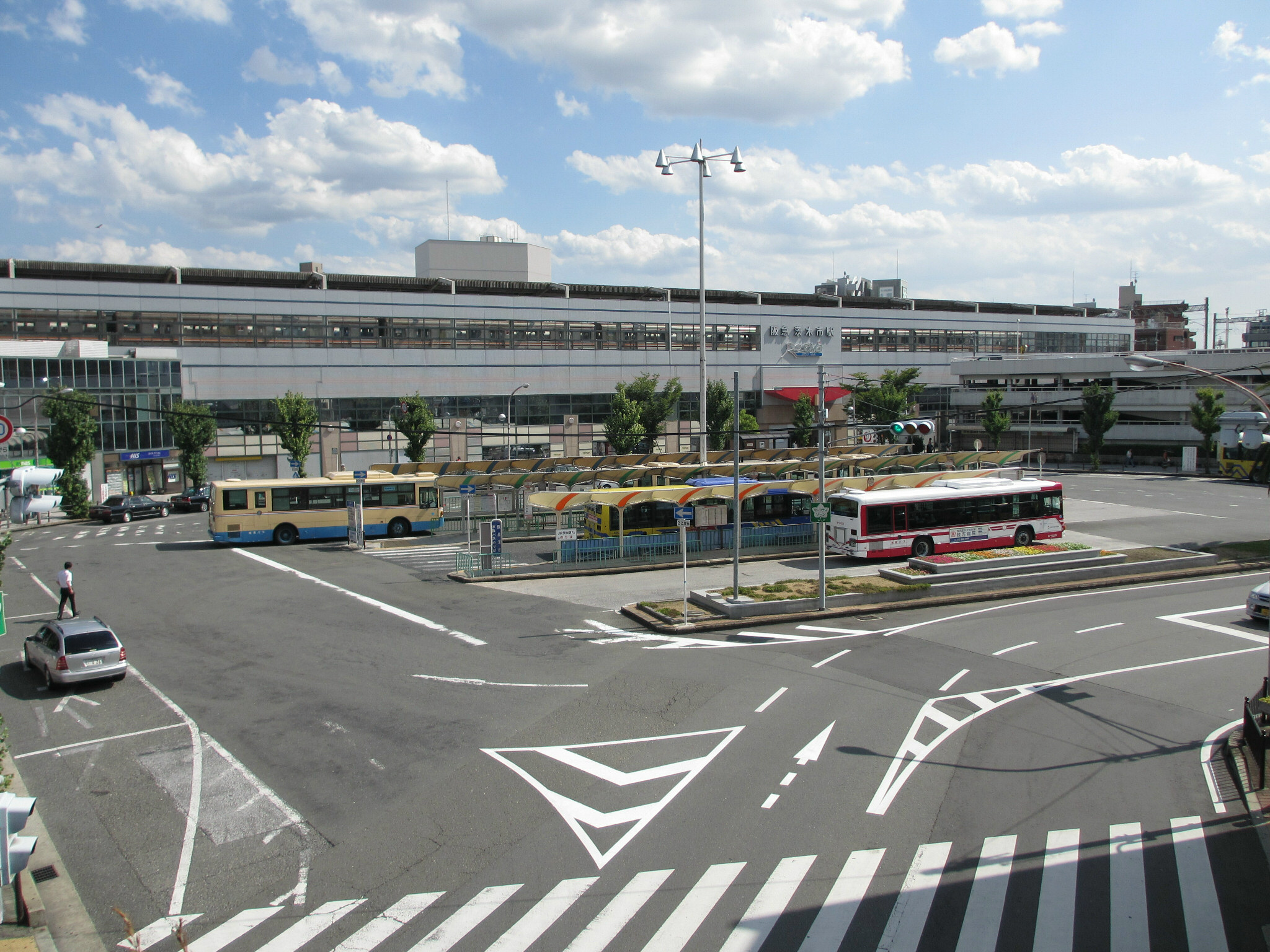
- Ibaraki-shi Station, October 2013

General information
- Location: 1-5 Eidaichō, Ibaraki-shi, Osaka-fu 567-0816
- Coordinates: 34°49′0.03″N 135°34′32.79″E
- Operator: Hankyu Railway.
- Line: ■ Hankyu Kyoto Line
- Distance: 14.8 km (9.2 miles) from Jūsō
- Platforms: 2 island platforms
- Tracks: 2

Construction
- Accessible: yes

Other information
- Status: Staffed
- Station code: HK-69
- Website: Official website

History
- Opened: January 16, 1928
- Former names: Ibaraki-machi (until 1948)

Passengers
- FY2019: 65,937 daily
Location
- Location within Osaka Prefecture Location within Japan

Ibaraki-shi Station (茨木市駅, Ibaraki-shi-eki; station number: HK-69) is a passenger railway station located in the city of Ibaraki, Osaka Prefecture, Japan. It is operated by the private transportation company Hankyu Railway.

== Lines ==
Ibaraki-shi Station is served by the Hankyu Kyoto Line, and is located 14.8 kilometers from the terminus of the line at Jūsō and 17.26 kilometers from Osaka-umeda.

== Layout ==
The station consists of two elevated island platforms with siding facilities. The platforms are on the 3rd floor, the concourse and ticket gates are on the 2nd floor of the station building, and there are one ticket gate each on the north and south sides.

=== Platforms ===
1, 2	■ Kyoto Line	for Kyoto-kawaramachi, Arashiyama
3, 4	■ Kyoto Line	for Osaka-umeda, Tengachaya, Kita-Senri, Kobe-Sannomiya, Takarazuka

== Adjacent stations ==
«	Service	»
Hankyu Kyoto Main Line
Rapid Limited Express "Kyo-Train", "Sagano", "Atago", "Togetsu", "Hozu": Does not stop at this station
Jūsō	Commuter Limited Express	Takatsuki-shi
Awaji	Limited Express	Takatsuki-shi
Awaji	Semi limited Express	Takatsuki-shi
Minami-Ibaraki	Express	Takatsuki-shi
Minami-Ibaraki	Semi-Express	Takatsuki-shi
Minami-Ibaraki	Local	Sōjiji

== History ==
Ibaraki-shi Station opened on 16 January 1928.

Station numbering was introduced to all Hankyu stations on 21 December 2013 with this station being designated as station number HK-69.

== Passenger statistics ==
In fiscal 2019, the station was used by an average of 65,937 passengers daily

== Surrounding area ==
- Ibaraki City Hall
- Ibaraki City Ibaraki Elementary School
- Ibaraki Municipal Yosei Junior High School
- Osaka Prefectural Ibaraki High School

== See also ==
- List of railway stations in Japan
