= Takatsuki-shi Station =

Railway station in Takatsuki, Osaka Prefecture, Japan

Takatsuki-shi Station 高槻市駅
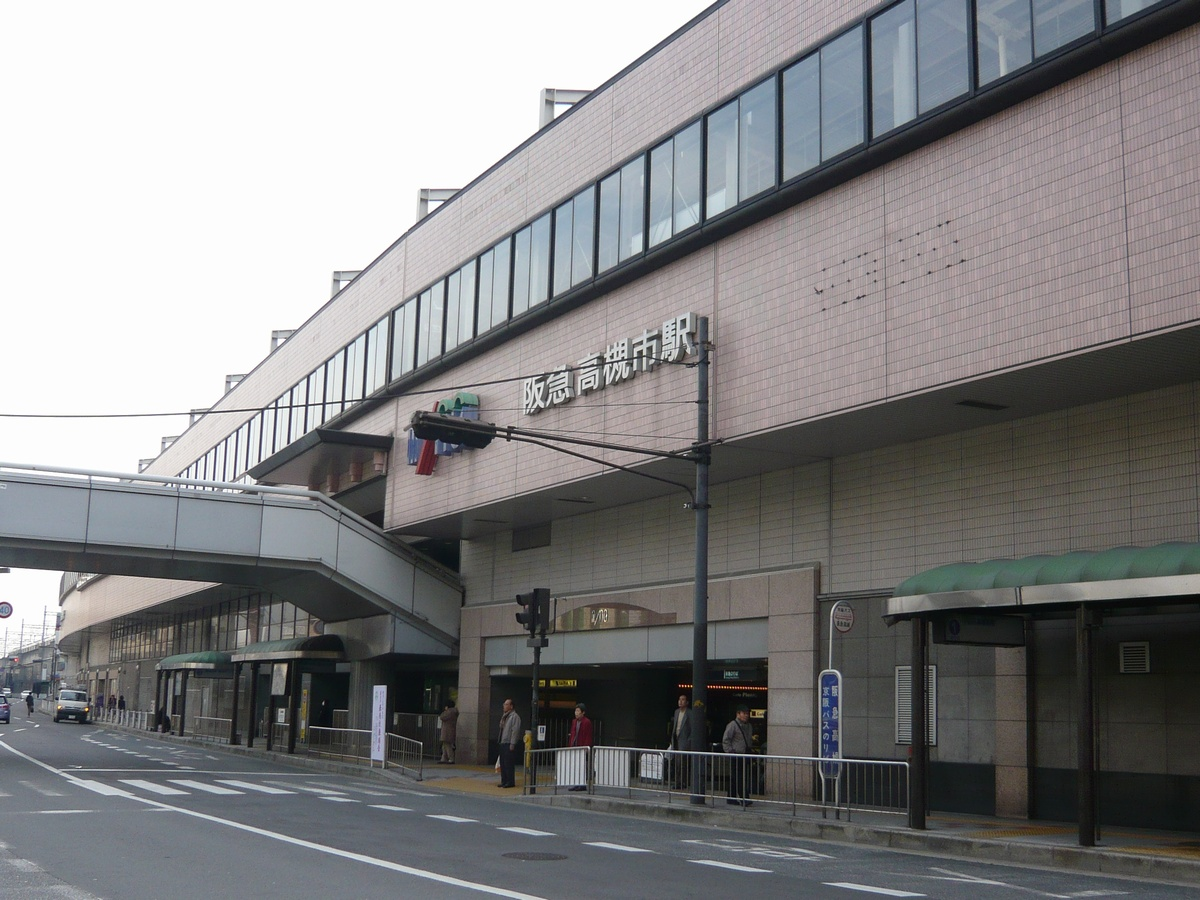
- Takatsuki-shi Station north exit, 2008

General information
- Location: 2-1 Jōhoku-chō, Takatsuki-shi, Osaka-fu 569-0071; Japan
- Coordinates: 34°51′00″N 135°37′23″E
- Operator: Hankyu Railway.
- Line: ■ Hankyu Kyoto Line
- Distance: 20.6 km (12.8 miles) from Jūsō
- Platforms: 2 island platforms
- Tracks: 4

Other information
- Status: Staffed
- Station code: HK-72
- Website: Official website

History
- Opened: January 16, 1928
- Former names: Takatsuki-machi (until 1943)

Passengers
- FY2019: 64,875 daily
Location
- Location within Osaka Prefecture Location within Japan

Takatsuki-shi Station (高槻市駅, Takatsuki-shi-eki; station number: HK-72) is a passenger railway station located in the city of Takatsuki, Osaka Prefecture, Japan. It is operated by the private transportation company Hankyu Railway. It is one of the main train stations of the city along with Takatsuki Station on the JR Kyoto Line.

== Lines ==
Takatsuki-shi Station is served by the Hankyu Kyoto Line, and is located 20.6 kilometers from the terminus of the line at Jūsō and 23.0 kilometers from Osaka-umeda. All types of train services on the line stop at Takatsuki-shi as one of key stations along the line. Many trains from Osaka, especially Osaka Metro rolling stock-operated services from the Sakaisuji Line, terminate at Takatsuki-shi.

== Layout ==
The elevated station consists of three levels:

- 1st level (ground): Ming Hankyu Takatsuki shopping center
- 2nd level: Station facilities (concourses, ticket gates and offices) and Ming Hankyu Takatsuki shopping center
- 3rd level: Platforms and tracks

There are two island platforms, each of which serves two tracks.

=== Platforms ===
1, 2	■ Kyoto Line	for Kyoto-kawaramachi, Arashiyama
3, 4	■ Kyoto Line	for Osaka-umeda, Tengachaya, Kita-Senri, Kobe-Sannomiya, Takarazuka

== Adjacent stations ==
«	Service	»
Kyoto Line
Tonda	Local	Kammaki
Ibaraki-shi	Semi-Express	Kammaki
Ibaraki-shi	Express	Nagaoka-Tenjin
Ibaraki-shi	Semi limited Express	Nagaoka-Tenjin
Ibaraki-shi	Limited Express	Nagaoka-Tenjin
Ibaraki-shi	Commuter Limited Express	Nagaoka-Tenjin
Rapid Limited Express "Kyo-Train", "Sagano", "Atago", "Togetsu", "Hozu": Does not stop at this station

== History ==
The station opened on January 16, 1928, and served as the terminal of the Shin-Keihan Line until its extension to Kyoto in November 1928. The station name was originally Takatsuki-machi Station (高槻町駅) (meaning Takatsuki Town) and was changed to the present one on January 1, 1943 when the town obtained the city status.

The construction of the elevated station replacing the original ground-level station was completed in 1994.

Station numbering was introduced to all Hankyu stations on 21 December 2013 with this station being designated as station number HK-72.

== Passenger statistics ==
In fiscal 2019, the station was used by an average of 64,875 passengers daily

== Surrounding area ==
- Osaka Medical and Pharmaceutical University
- Takatsuki Station
- Takatsuki Junior and Senior High School
- Osaka Prefectural Tsukinoki High School

== See also ==
- List of railway stations in Japan
