= Nakatsu Station (Osaka Metro) =

Metro station in Osaka, Japan

Nakatsu Station 中津駅
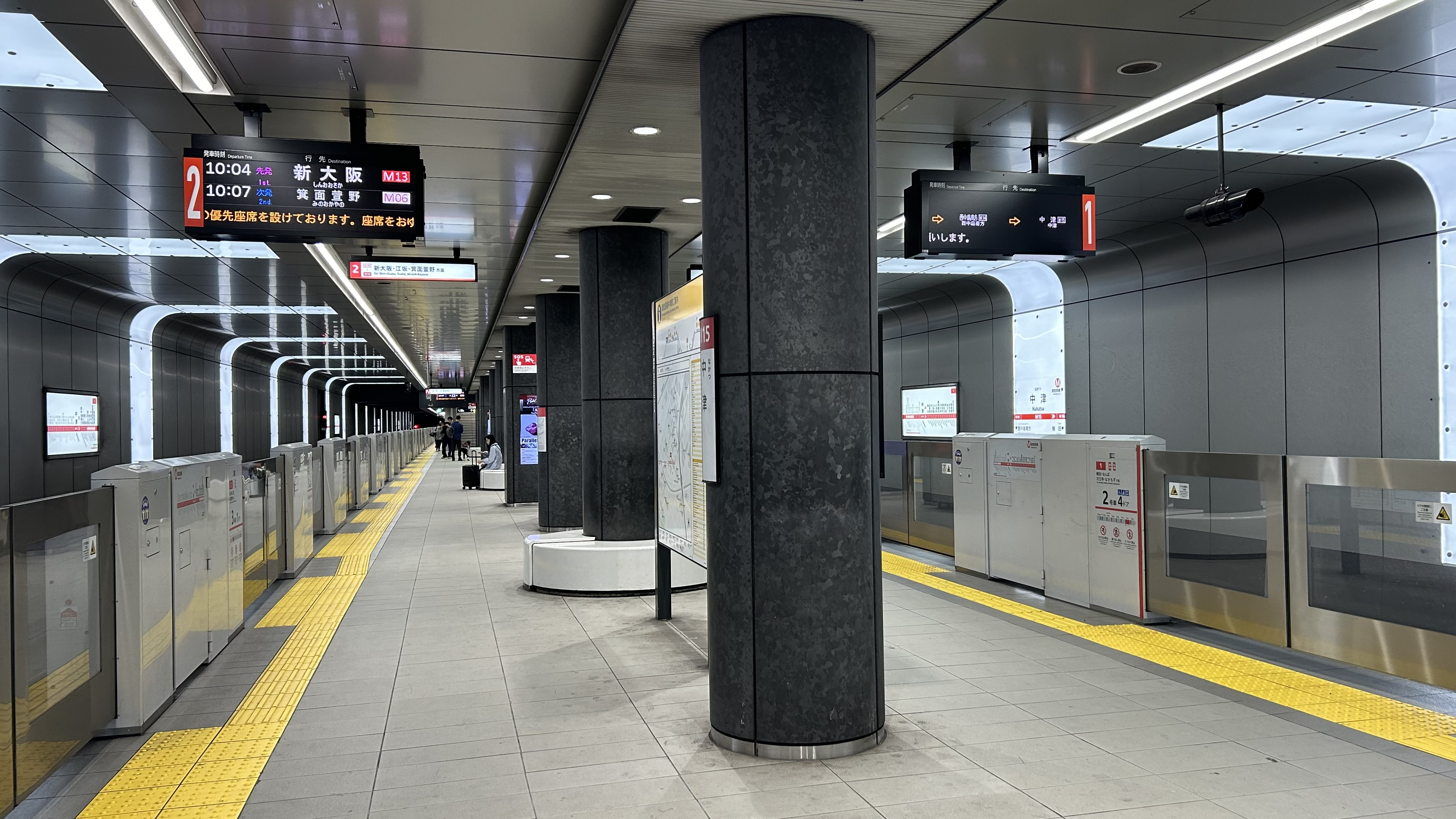
- Platform

General information
- Location: 13-19, Nakatsu Itchome, Kita, Osaka, Osaka （大阪市北区中津一丁目13-19） Japan
- Coordinates: 34°42′39.7″N 135°29′48.88″E
- System: Osaka Metro
- Operator: Osaka Metro
- Line: Midōsuji Line
- Platforms: 1 island platform
- Tracks: 2
- Connections: Bus stop

Construction
- Structure type: Underground

Other information
- Station code: M 15

History
- Opened: 24 September 1964; 61 years ago

Services
Preceding station	Osaka Metro	Following station
Nishinakajima-Minamigata M 14 towards Esaka	Midōsuji Line	Umeda M 16 towards Nakamozu
Location
- Location within Osaka Prefecture Location within Japan

Nakatsu Station (中津駅, nakatsu-eki) is a train station in Kita-ku, Osaka, Japan on the Osaka Metro Midōsuji Line. While situated relatively close to the station of the same name operated by Hankyu Railway, there is no free transfer between the two stations.

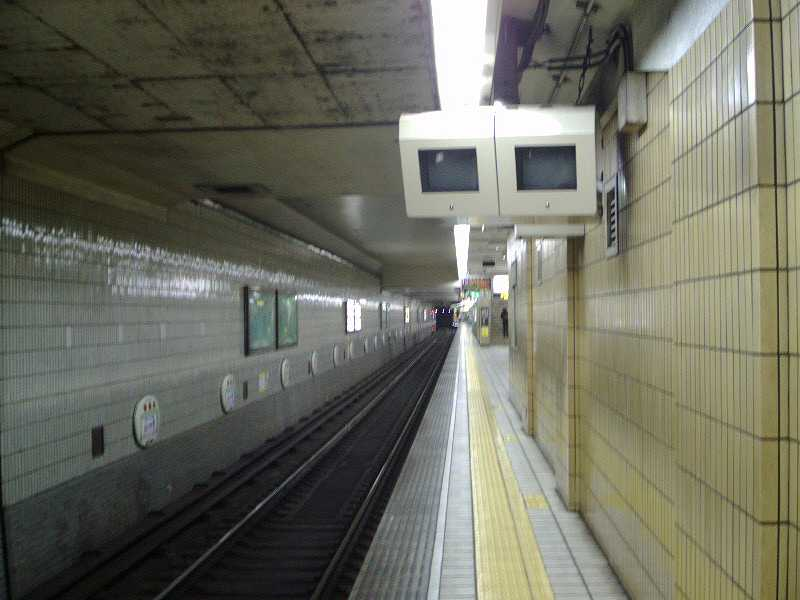
Platform prior to 2020 renovation

== Layout ==
This station has an island platform serving two tracks on the second basement and a Y returning track in the north of the platform.

1	■ Midōsuji Line	for Umeda, Namba, Tennōji and Nakamozu
2	■ Midōsuji Line	for Shin-Ōsaka, Esaka and Minoh-kayano
