= Nakatsu Station (Hankyu) =

Railway station in Osaka, Japan

Nakatsu Station 中津駅
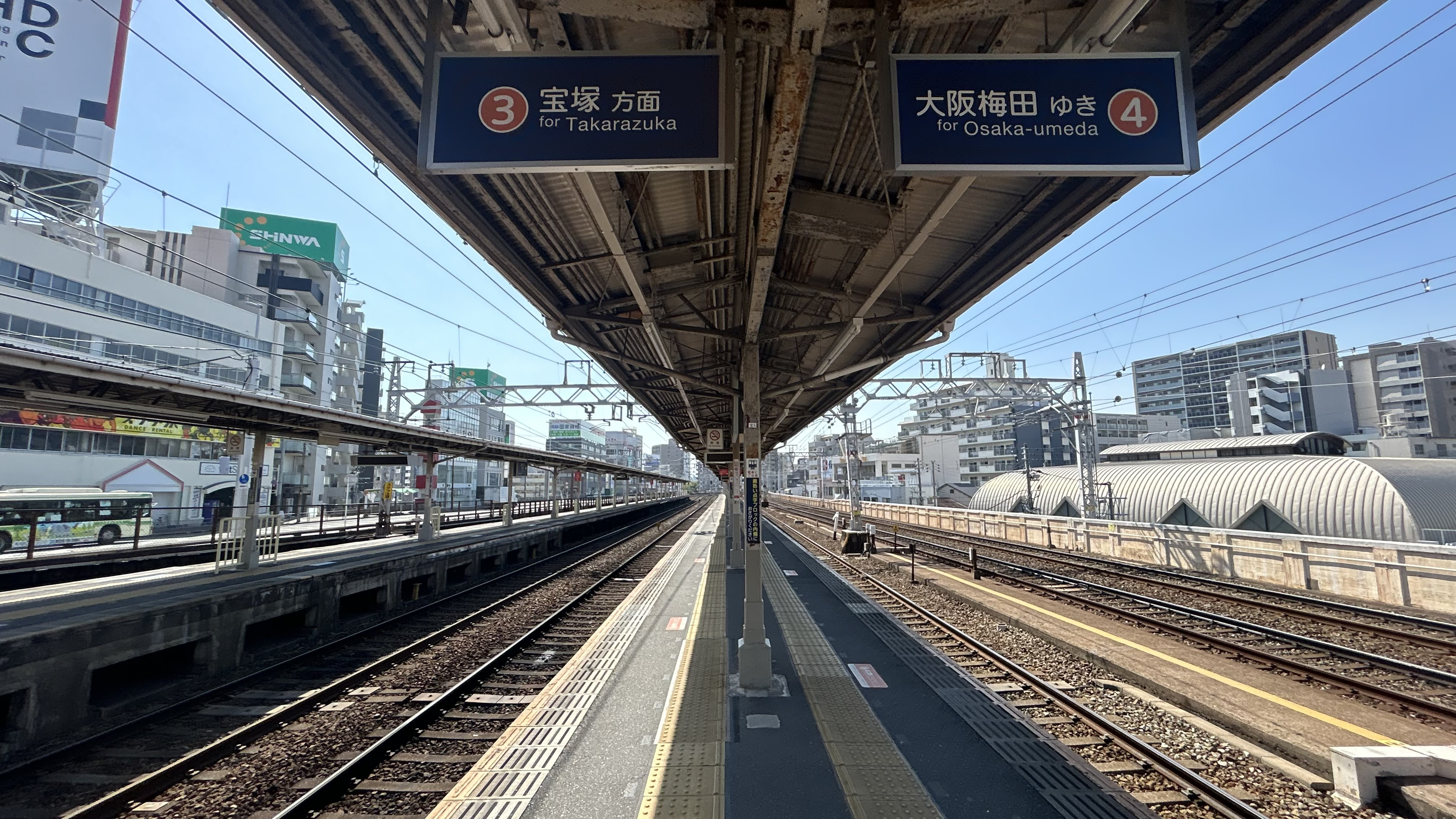
- Takarazuka Line platform

General information
- Location: Nakatsu Sanchōme, Kita, Osaka, Osaka （大阪市北区中津3丁目） Japan
- Coordinates: 34°42′35.05″N 135°29′34.76″E
- Operator: Hankyu Corporation
- Lines: Kōbe Main Line; Takarazuka Main Line
- Connections: Bus stop

Other information
- Station code: HK-02

History
- Opened: 1925

Services
Preceding station	Hankyu Railway	Following station
Osaka-umeda HK-01 Terminus	Kōbe Main Line Local	Jūsō HK-03 towards Kobe-Sannomiya
Osaka-umeda HK-01 Terminus	Takarazuka Main Line Local	Jūsō HK-03 towards Takarazuka
Osaka-umeda HK-01 Terminus	Takarazuka Main Line Semi-Express	Jūsō HK-03 One-way operation
Location

Nakatsu Station (中津駅, Nakatsu-eki) is a railway station in Kita-ku, Osaka, Japan on the Hankyu Kobe Line and the Hankyu Takarazuka Line, and is operated by Hankyu Railway. While situated relatively close to the station of the same name on the Midosuji Line, there are no free transfers between the two stations. In past, there was a car stop on the Hanshin Railway Kita-Osaka Line in the west side of this station on the Hankyu Railway lines.

== Layout ==
The station consists of four tracks and two island platforms, each serving one line. Trains of the Kyoto Line run alongside the Kobe Line and the Takarazuka Line, but do not stop at Nakatsu. Officially the tracks for Kyoto Line are treated as express tracks for Takarazuka Line.

The Kyoto Line services do not stop at this station because of the absence of any platforms on this line.

1	■ Kobe Line	for Nishinomiya-kitaguchi and Kobe (Kobe Sannomiya, Kosoku Kobe, Shinkaichi) (Change trains at Juso for Kyoto-kawaramachi and Kita-Senri)
2	■ Kobe Line	Osaka-umeda
3	■ Takarazuka Line	for Kawanishi-Noseguchi, Takarazuka and Minoo (Change trains at Juso for Kyoto-kawaramachi and Kita-Senri)
4	■ Takarazuka Line	Osaka-umeda
5	■ Kyoto Line	Passing track (to Kyoto-kawaramachi and Kita-Senri)
6	■ Kyoto Line	Passing track (to Osaka-umeda)

== History ==
Nakatsu Station 中津駅

General information
- Location: Nakatsu, Kita, Osaka, Osaka （大阪市北区中津） Japan
- Operator: Hanshin Electric Railway
- Line: Kita-Osaka Line

History
- Opened: 1914
- Closed: 1975
Location

- 3 August 1914 - Nakatsu Station on the Hanshin Railway Kita-Osaka Line opened.
- 4 November 1925 - Nakatsu Station on the Hanshin Kyuko Railway (present: Hankyu) lines opened.
- 5 September 1926 - The Hanshin Kyuko Railway lines from Umeda to Juso were elevated. Nakatsu Station became an elevated station serving 4 tracks, 2 tracks for one line.
- 6 May 1975 - The Hanshin Railway Kita-Osaka Line was abolished.
- 21 December 2013 - Station numbering was introduced to all Hankyu stations with this station being designated as station number HK-02.

== Adjacent stations ==
=== Former services ===
«	Service	»
Hanshin Railway Kita-Osaka Line
Higashi-Oyodo	-	Kitano
