= Jūsō Station =

Railway station in Osaka, Japan

Jūsō Station 十三駅
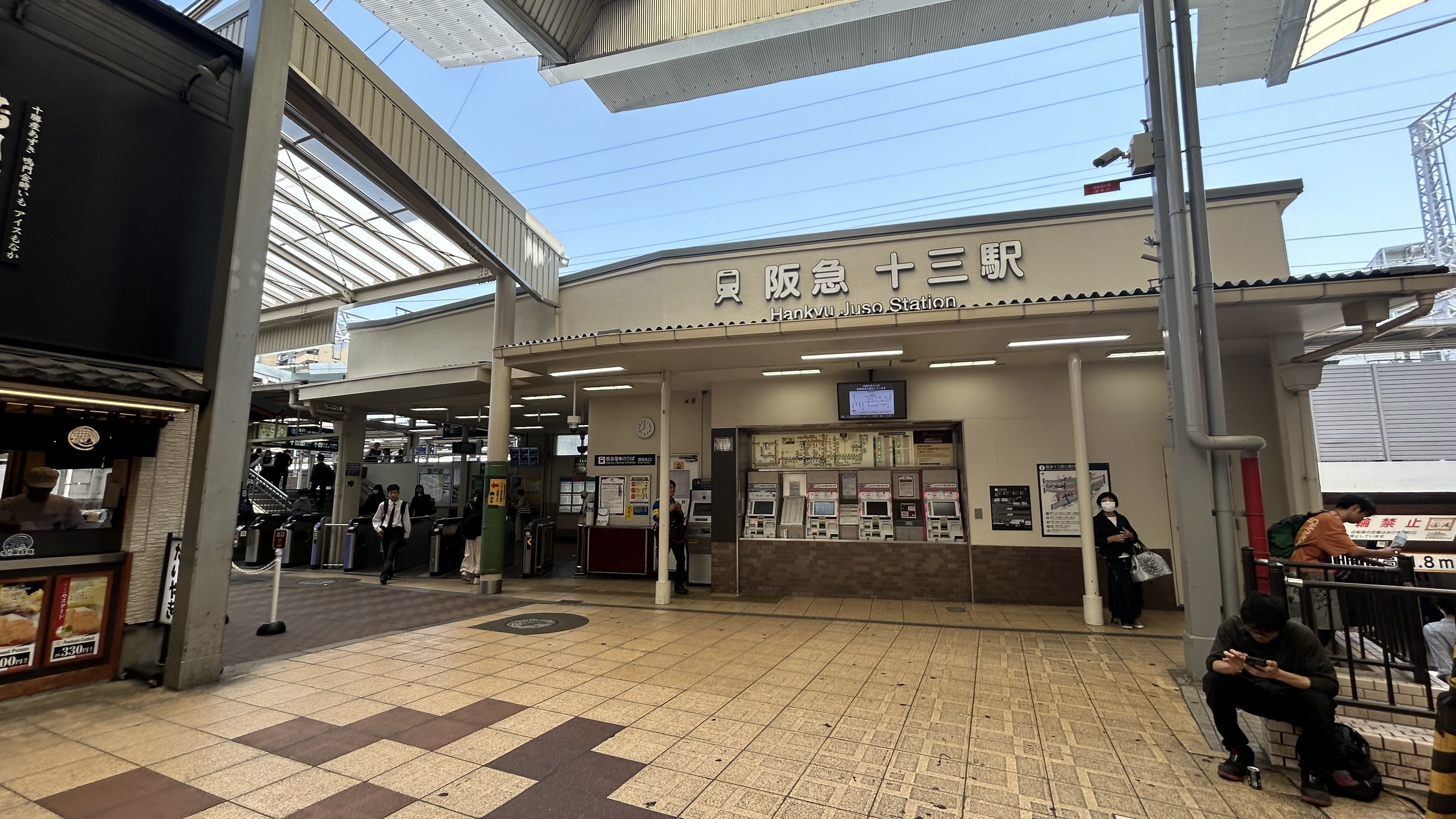
- West gate of Jūsō Station

General information
- Location: Juso-higashi Nichome, Yodogawa, Osaka, Osaka （大阪市淀川区十三東二丁目） Japan
- Coordinates: 34°43′11.61″N 135°28′58.05″E
- Operator: Hankyu Railway
- Lines: Takarazuka Main Line; Kōbe Main Line; Kyōto Main Line
- Platforms: 2 island platforms; 2 side platforms
- Tracks: 6
- Connections: Bus stop

Other information
- Station code: HK-03

History
- Opened: 10 March 1910
Services
Preceding station	Hankyu Railway	Following station
Nakatsu HK-02 towards Osaka-umeda	Kōbe Main Line Local	Kanzakigawa HK-04 towards Kobe-Sannomiya
Osaka-umeda HK-01 Terminus	Kōbe Main Line Semi-Express	Tsukaguchi HK-06 One-way operation
Osaka-umeda HK-01 Terminus	Kōbe Main Line Commuter Express Express Semi-Limited Express Commuter Limited Express	Tsukaguchi HK-06 towards Kobe-Sannomiya
Osaka-umeda HK-01 Terminus	Kōbe Main Line Limited Express	Nishinomiya-Kitaguchi HK-08 towards Kobe-Sannomiya
Nakatsu HK-02 towards Osaka-umeda	Takarazuka Main Line Local	Mikuni HK-41 towards Takarazuka
Osaka-umeda HK-01 Terminus	Takarazuka Main Line Semi-Express	Sone HK-44 One-way operation
Osaka-umeda HK-01 Terminus	Takarazuka Main Line Express	Toyonaka HK-46 towards Takarazuka
Osaka-umeda HK-01 Terminus	Takarazuka Main Line Commuter Limited Express	Toyonaka HK-46 One-way operation
Osaka-umeda HK-01 Terminus	Nissei Express	Ishibashi handai-mae HK-48 towards Nissei-chuo
Osaka-umeda HK-01 Terminus	Kyōto Main Line Local Semi-Express	Minamikata HK-61 towards Kyoto-kawaramachi
Osaka-umeda HK-01 Terminus	Kyōto Main Line Express Limited Express Semi-Limited Express Rapid Limited Express	Awaji HK-63 towards Kyoto-kawaramachi
Osaka-umeda HK-01 Terminus	Kyōto Main Line Commuter Limited Express	Ibaraki-shi HK-69 towards Kyoto-kawaramachi
Location

Jūsō Station (十三駅, Jūsō eki) is a railway station in Jūsō, Yodogawa-ku, Osaka, Japan, operated by the private railway operator Hankyu Railway. The six-track trunk line from Umeda Station diverges into the three double tracks of the Hankyu Kobe Line, the Hankyu Kyoto Line and the Hankyu Takarazuka Line at this station. The area surrounding the station is an extensive shopping and entertainment district.

== Station layout ==
This station has two island platforms and two side platforms serving six tracks on the ground level, enabling to change trains from the Kobe Line for Umeda to the Takarazuka Line for Takarazuka and Minoo on one island platform between Tracks 2 and 3, and from the Takarazuka Line for Umeda to the Kyoto Line for Kyoto (Kawaramachi, Arashiyama) and Kita-Senri on another island platform between Tracks 4 and 5. The platforms are connected by two transfer concourses, one elevated and one underground. The east gate connects directly to platform 6 while the west gate connects directly to platform 1. Several shops and restaurants serving transferring passengers are located inside the station.

There is a returning track in the south of the station between the Kobe Line and the Takarazuka Line. The track is used for the trains for the Kobe Line and the Takarazuka Line running to and from Shojaku Workshop for maintenance, and for seasonal trains running between Kobe or Takarazuka and Arashiyama via the Kobe Line and the Kyoto Line.

1	■ Kobe Line	for Nishinomiya-kitaguchi, Kobe (Kobe-sannomiya, Shinkaichi) and Nigawa
2	■ Kobe Line	for Osaka-umeda (Local trains stop at Nakatsu)
3	■ Takarazuka Line	for Takarazuka, Ishibashi handai-mae, Minoo, Kawanishi-noseguchi and the Nose Railway line (Nissei Chūō)
4	■ Takarazuka Line	for Osaka-umeda (Semi-express trains and local trains stop at Nakatsu)
5	■ Kyoto Line	for Takatsuki-shi, Kyoto-kawaramachi, Arashiyama and Kita-Senri
6	■ Kyoto Line	to Osaka-umeda (No trains stop at Nakatsu)

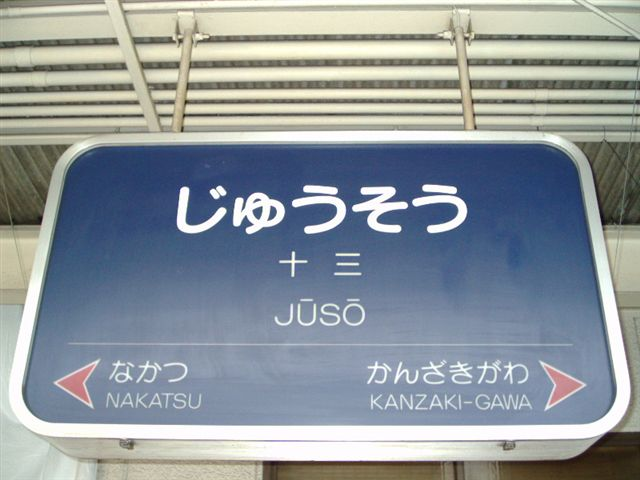
Tracks 1-2 (Kobe Line)

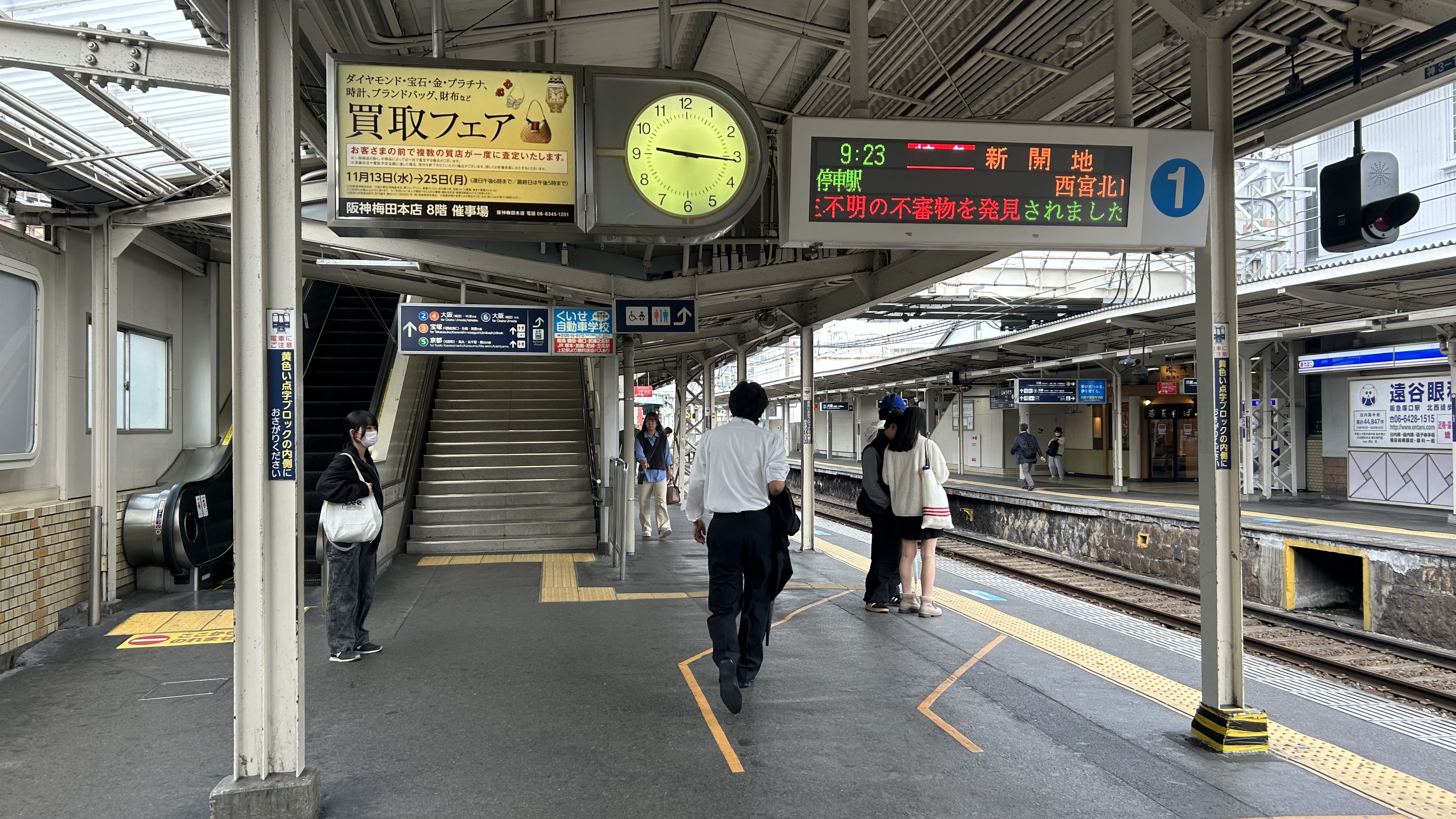
Tracks 1-2 (Kobe Line)

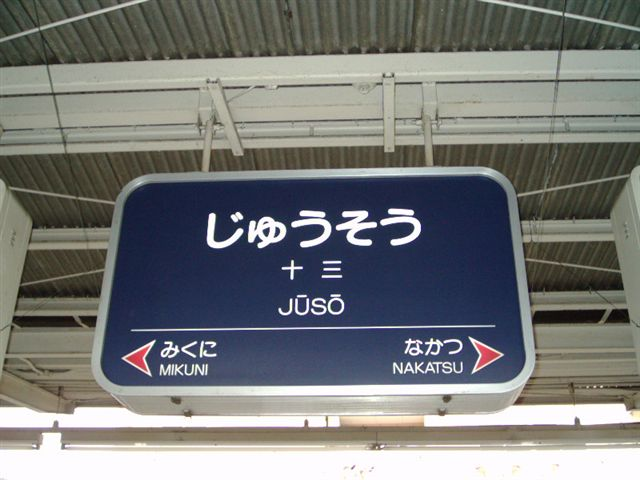
Tracks 3-4 (Takarazuka Line)

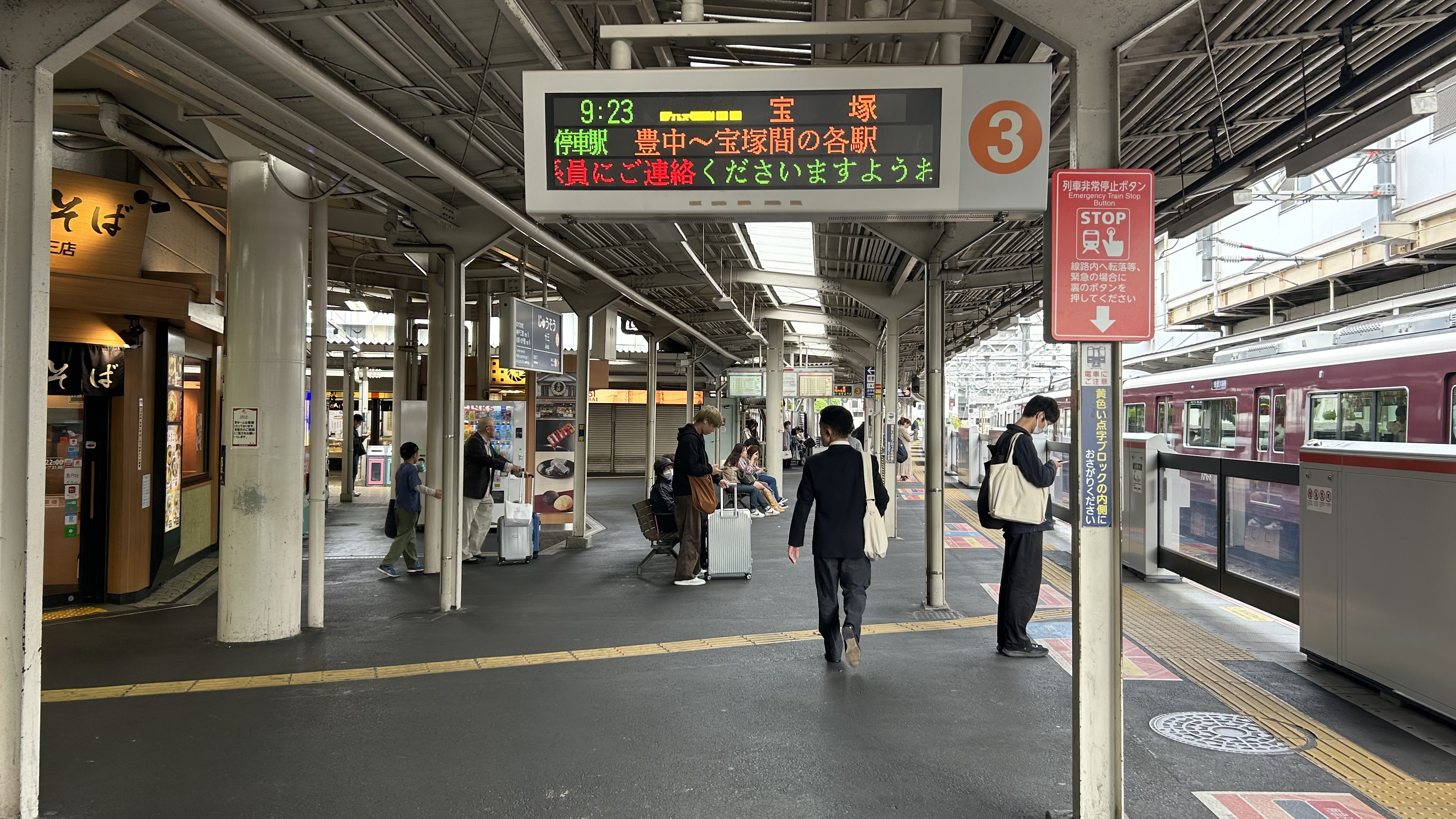
Tracks 3-4 (Takarazuka Line)

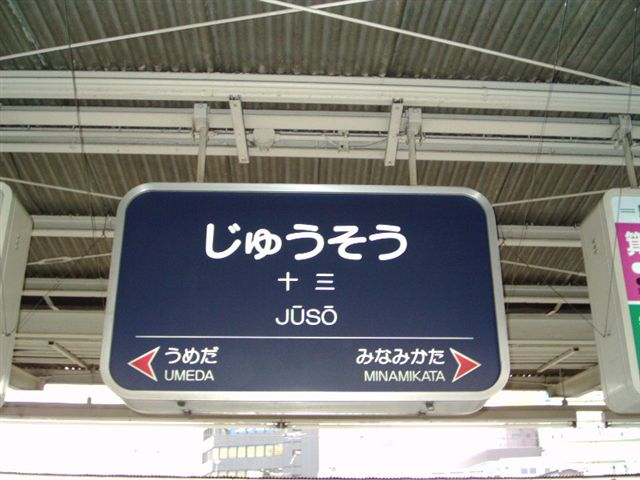
Tracks 5-6 (Kyoto Line)

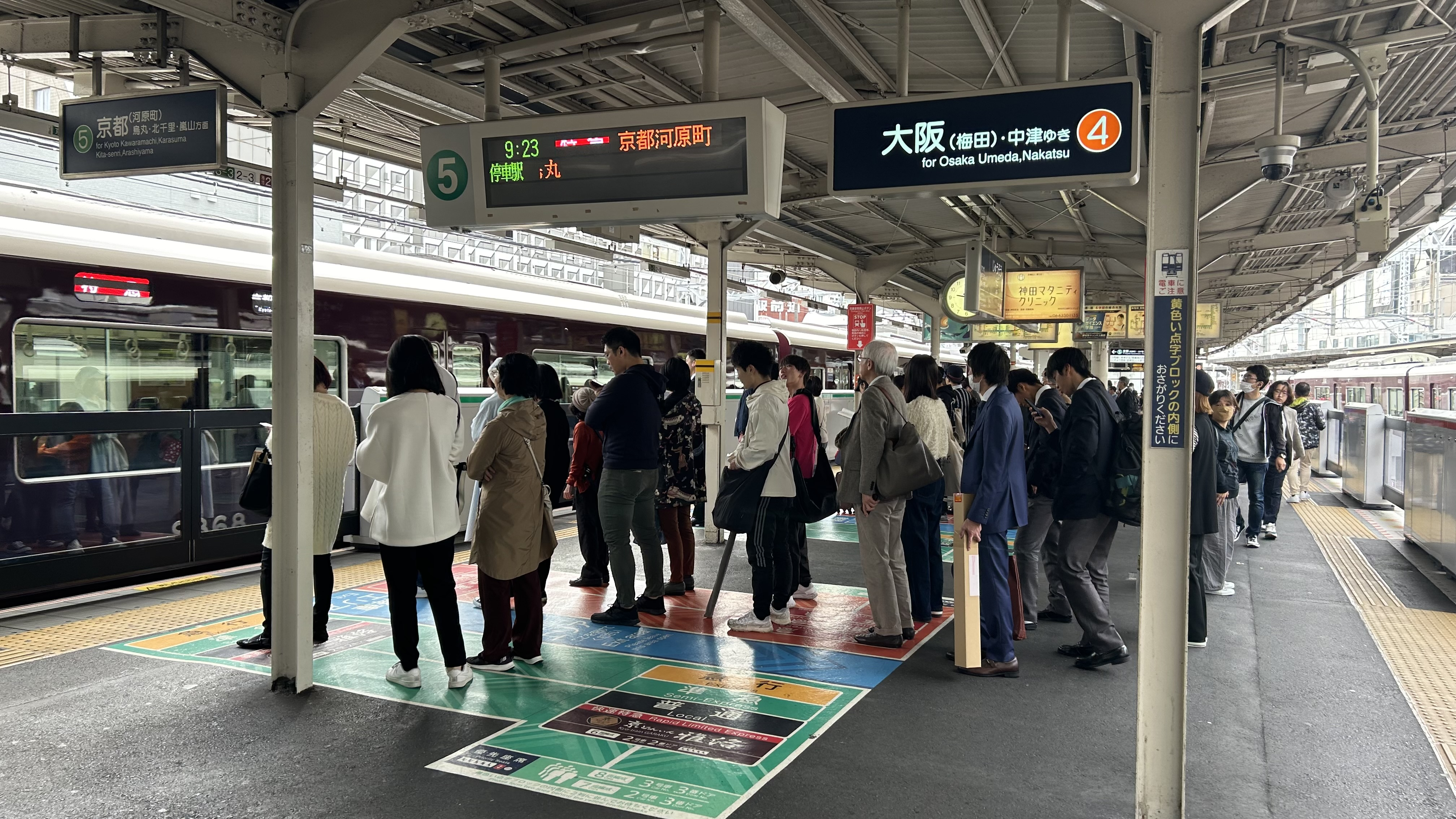
Tracks 5-6 (Kyoto Line)

== History ==
The station opened on 10 March 1910, as a stop on the Minoo-Arima Railway (today's Takarazuka Line). The Kobe Line was added in 1920. In 1921, the North Osaka Electric Railway began service between Juso and Senriyama; this line was acquired by the Keihan Electric Railway and was extended from Awaji Station to both Kyoto and central Osaka. Keihan and Hankyu merged in 1943, bringing all of Juso's lines under common ownership. While Keihan was again spun off as a separate company in 1949, Hankyu retained the Juso-Kyoto and Senriyama lines. Juso served as the terminal of the Kyoto Main Line until 1959, when the line was extended to Umeda.

Station numbering was introduced to all Hankyu stations on 21 December 2013 with this station being designated as station number HK-03.
