= Umeda Station =

Major railway and metro station in Osaka, Japan

Umeda Station 梅田駅
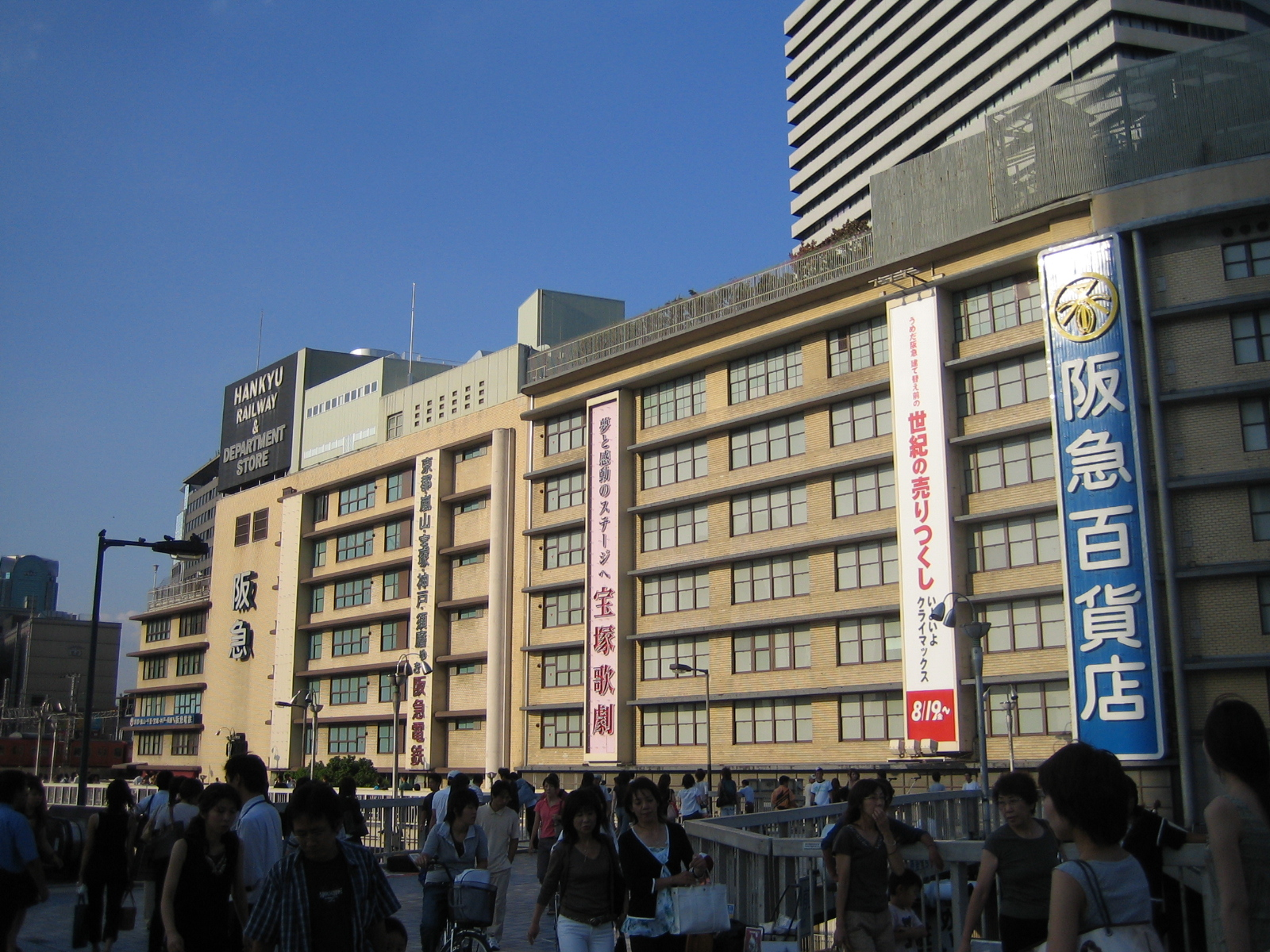

General information
- Location: Kita Ward, Osaka City, Osaka Prefecture; Japan
- Operator: Hanshin Electric Railway; Hankyu Railway; Osaka Metro; JR Freight
- Connections: Bus terminal
Location

Umeda Station (Japanese: 梅田駅, Hepburn: Umeda-eki) is a major railway station in Kita-ku in the northern commercial center of Osaka, Japan. It is the busiest station in western Japan, serving 2,343,727 passengers daily in 2005.

Umeda Station is served by the following railways:

- Hankyu Railway (Kōbe Line, Kyōto Line, Takarazuka Line) - Osaka-umeda Station
- Hanshin Electric Railway (Main Line) - Osaka Umeda Station
- Osaka Metro (Midōsuji Line, Station number: M16)

The freight terminal of Japan Freight Railway Company (JR Freight) (Umeda Freight Branch of Tōkaidō Main Line), closed in 2013, was also called Umeda. Portions of this line were moved underground in 2023.

The nearby stations Ōsaka (JR West), Kitashinchi (JR West Tōzai Line), Nishi-Umeda (Osaka Subway Yotsubashi Line, Y11) and Higashi-Umeda (Osaka Subway Tanimachi Line, T20) are within walking distance and connected by a large complex of underground malls.

== Hanshin Railway ==
Osaka-Umeda Station 大阪梅田駅
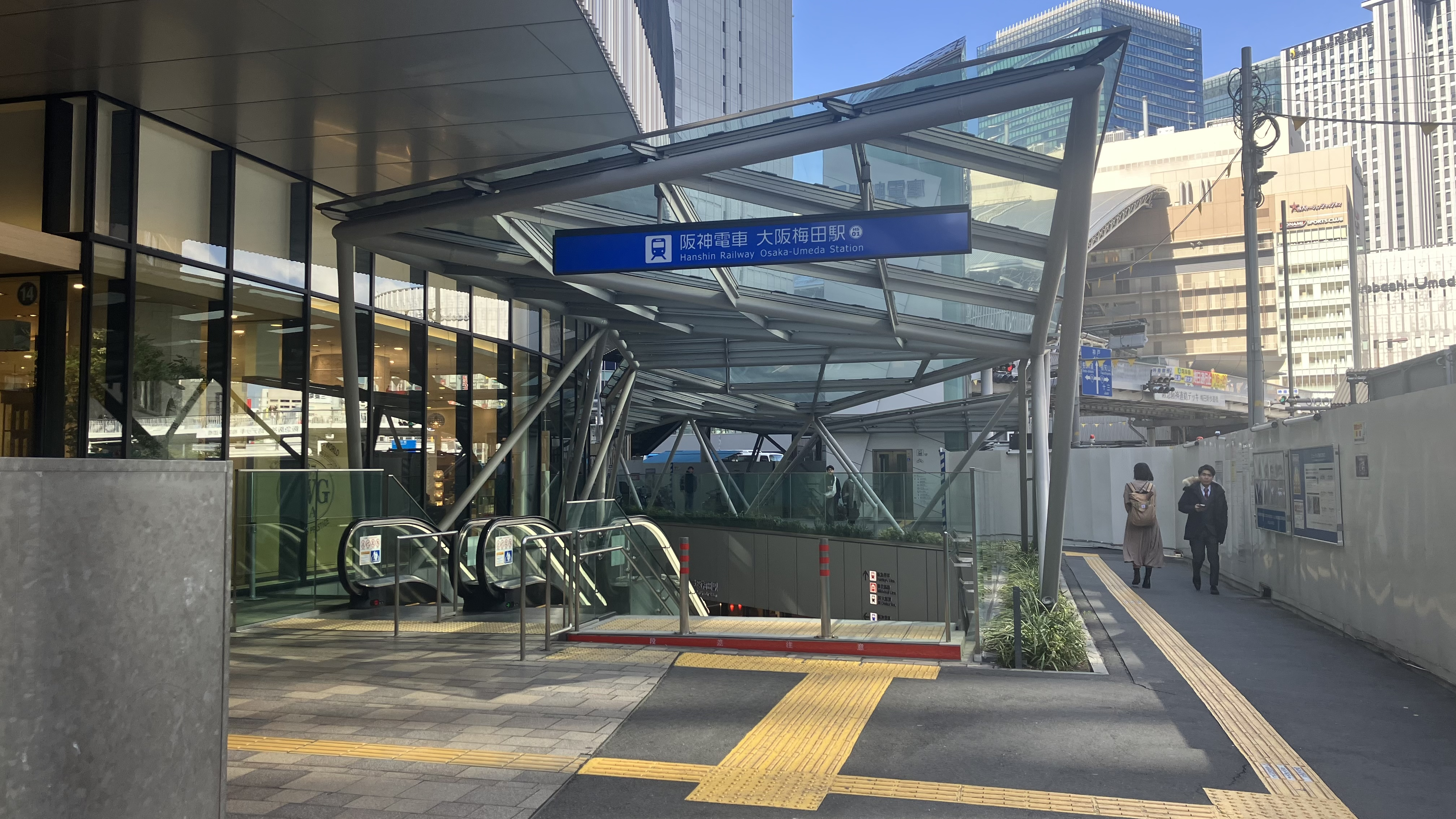

General information
- Location: Umeda Sanchōme, Kita-ku, Osaka, Osaka Prefecture; Japan
- Coordinates: 34°42′3.49″N 135°29′47.2″E
- System: Hanshin Railway station
- Operator: Hanshin Electric Railway
- Line: Hanshin Main Line

Other information
- Station code: HS 01

History
- Opened: 1906
Location
- Location within Osaka city Location within Osaka Prefecture Location within Japan

The underground Umeda terminal of Hanshin Electric Railway (officially Osaka-Umeda Station, but commonly called Hanshin Osaka-Umeda Station) is located south of Ōsaka Station, next to underground of Hanshin Department Store. The Hanshin station first opened on December 21, 1906 as a ground level station and moved to the present underground location on March 21, 1939.

=== Layout ===
There are five bay platforms and four tracks on the second basement. There are east ticket gates on the second basement and center ticket gates and west ticket gates on the first basement.

■Main Line for Amagasaki, Koshien, Kobe Sannomiya, Akashi and Himeji
1	(Not used during non-rush hour) ■■limited express trains (for Kobe and Himeji) including the first one departing for Himeji at 6:00
2	■■limited express trains (for Kobe and Himeji)
3	■express trains ■morning express trains ■a limited express train departing for Himeji at 6:25 (weekdays)
4	■local trains

=== Adjacent stations of Hanshin Osaka-Umeda ===
«	Service	»
Main Line (HS 01)
Terminus	Local (普通, every day)	Fukushima (HS 02)
Terminus	Morning Express(区間急行, on weekdays)	Fukushima (HS 02)
Terminus	Express (急行, every day)	Noda (HS 03)
Terminus	Limited Express (直通特急, 特急, every day)	Amagasaki (HS 09)
Terminus	Morning Limited Express terminating at Umeda (区間特急, on weekdays)	Noda (HS 03)

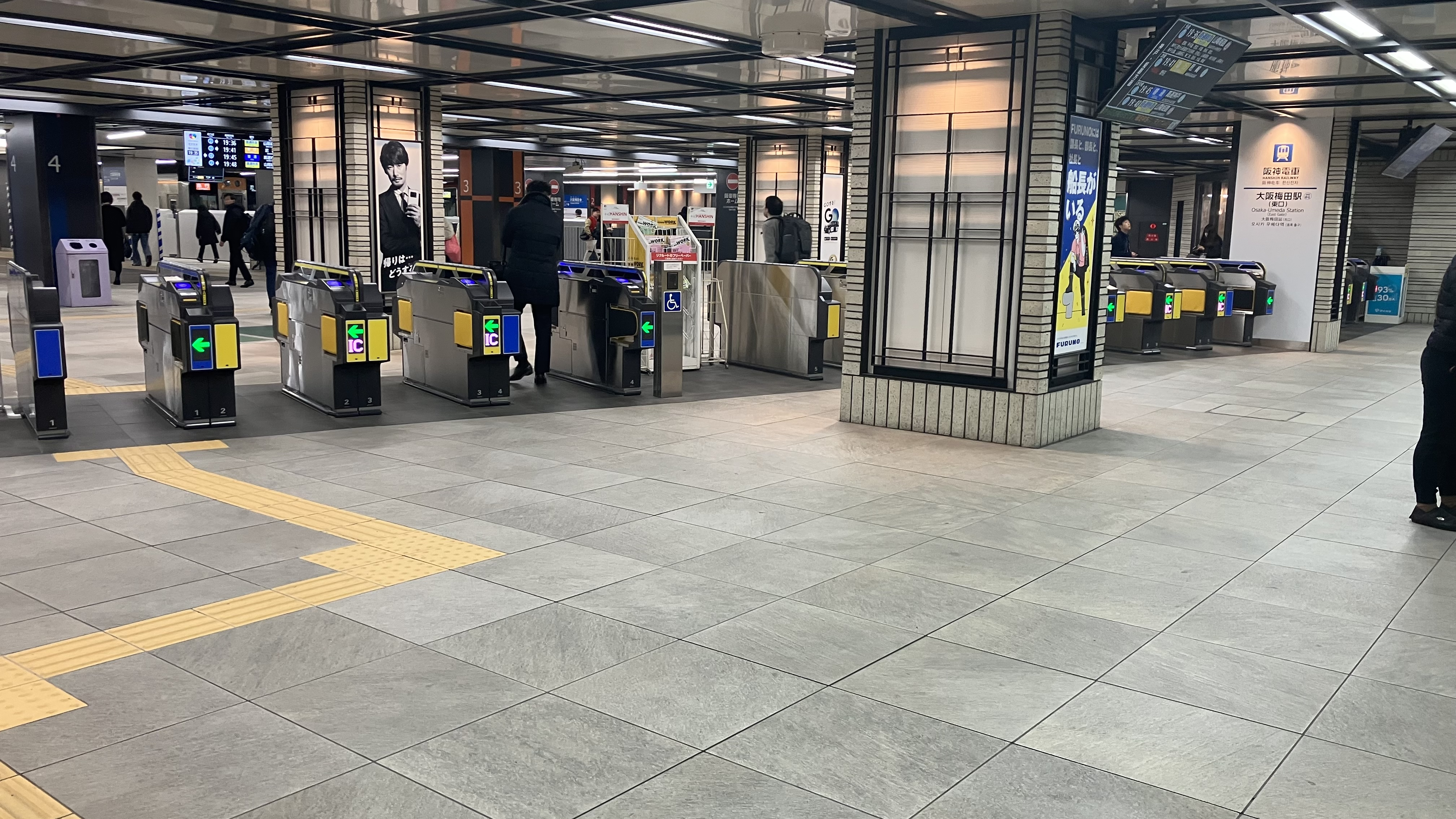
East Exit

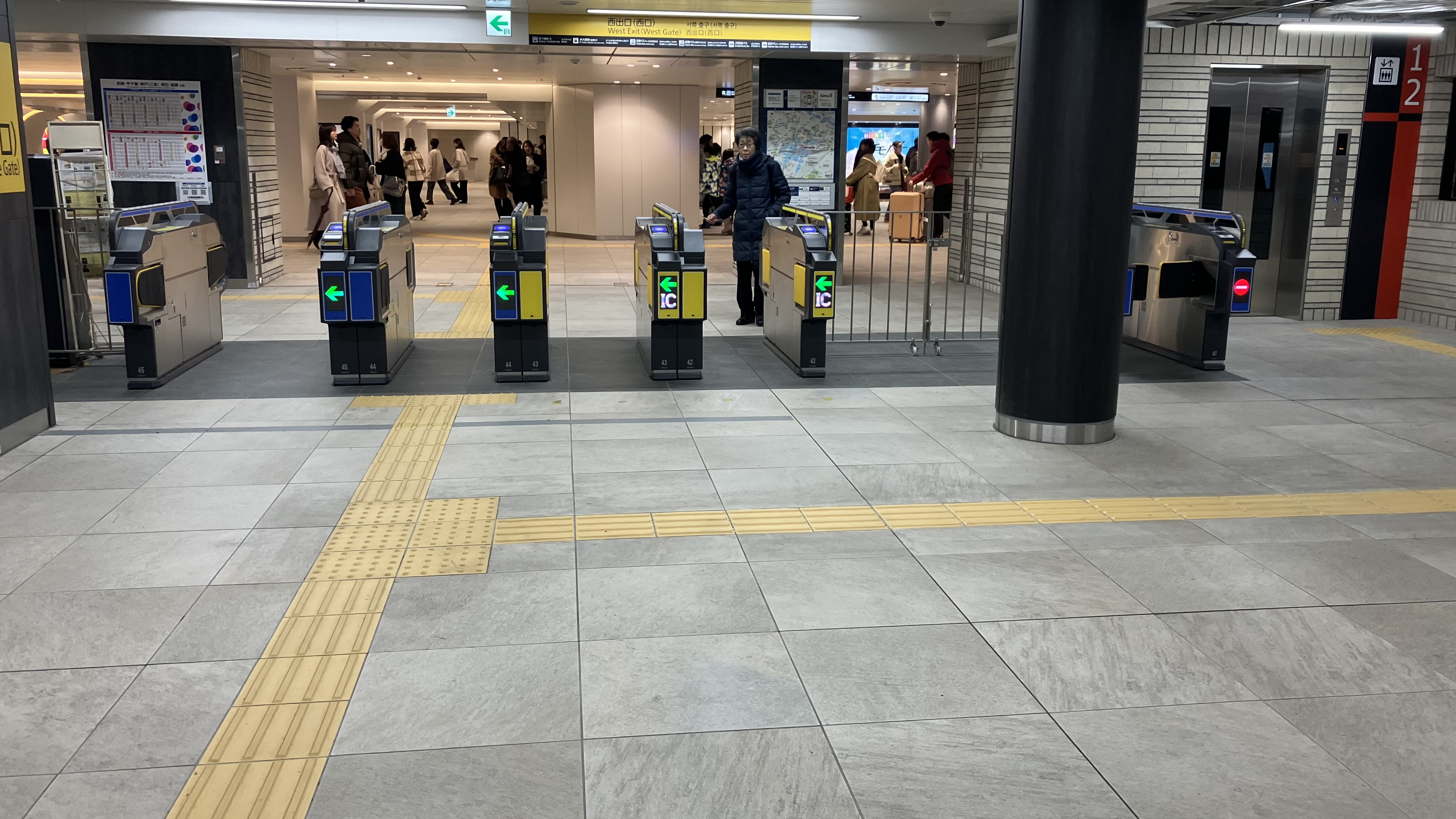
West Exit

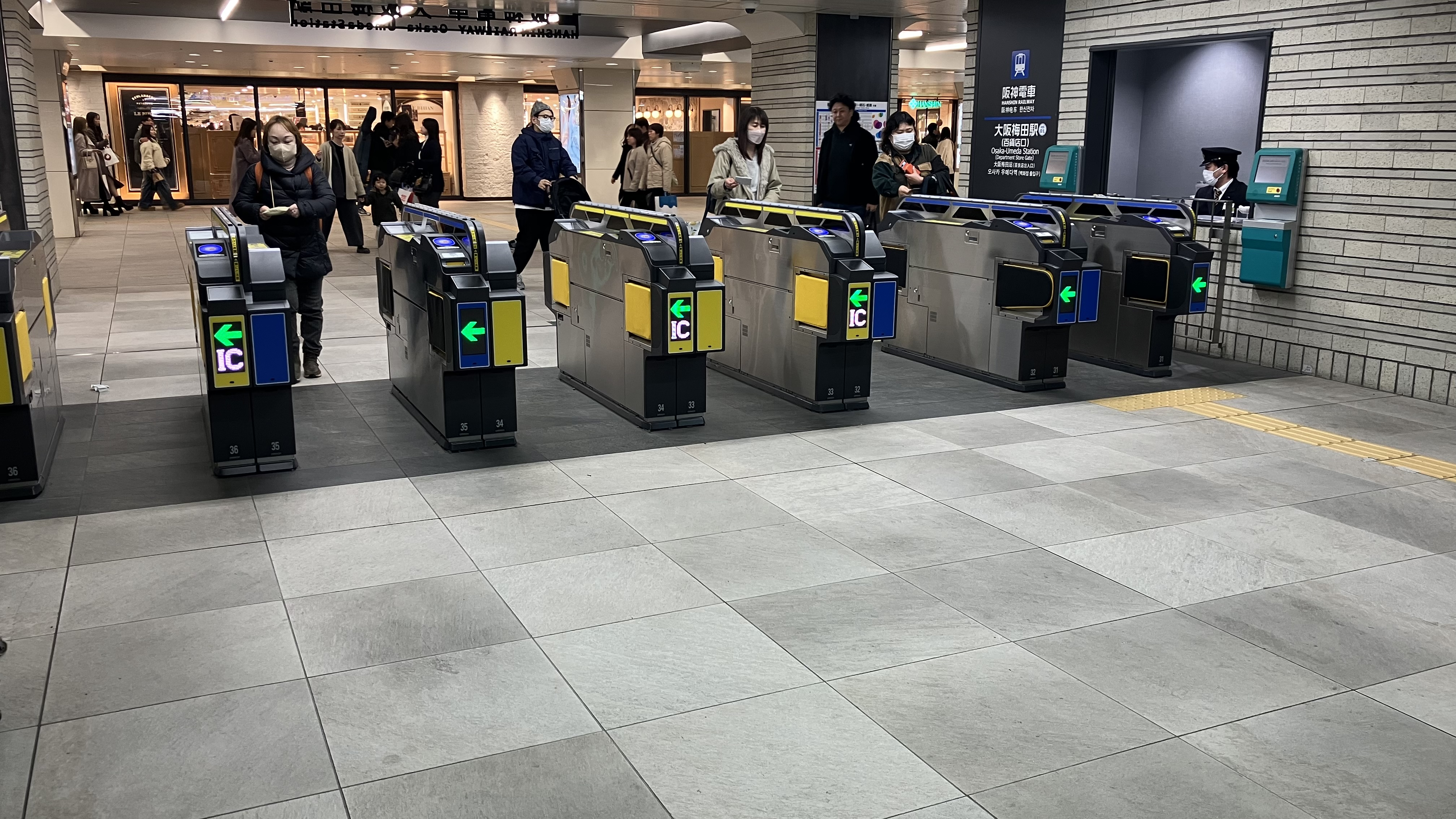
Department Store Entrance

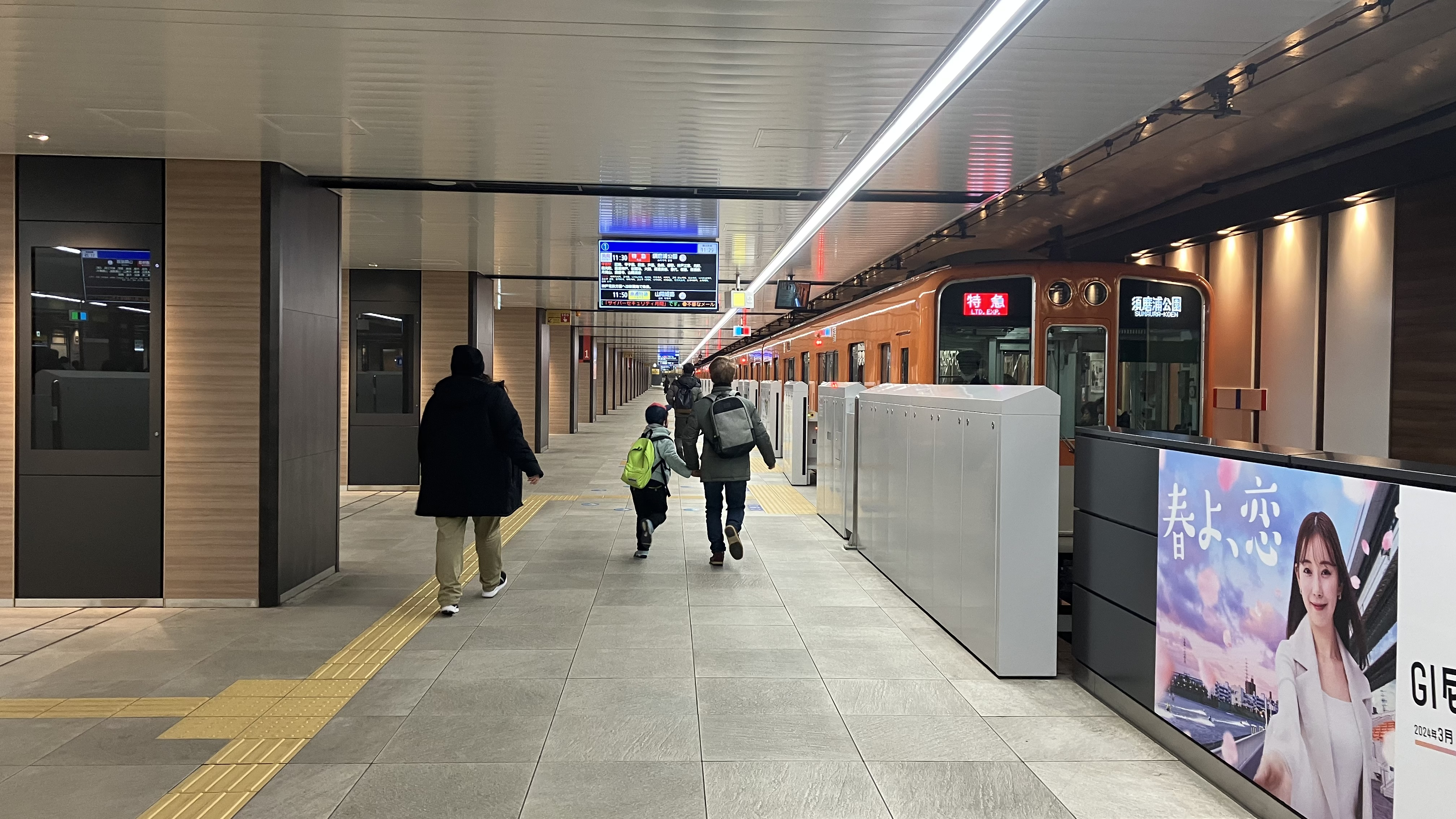
Platform 1

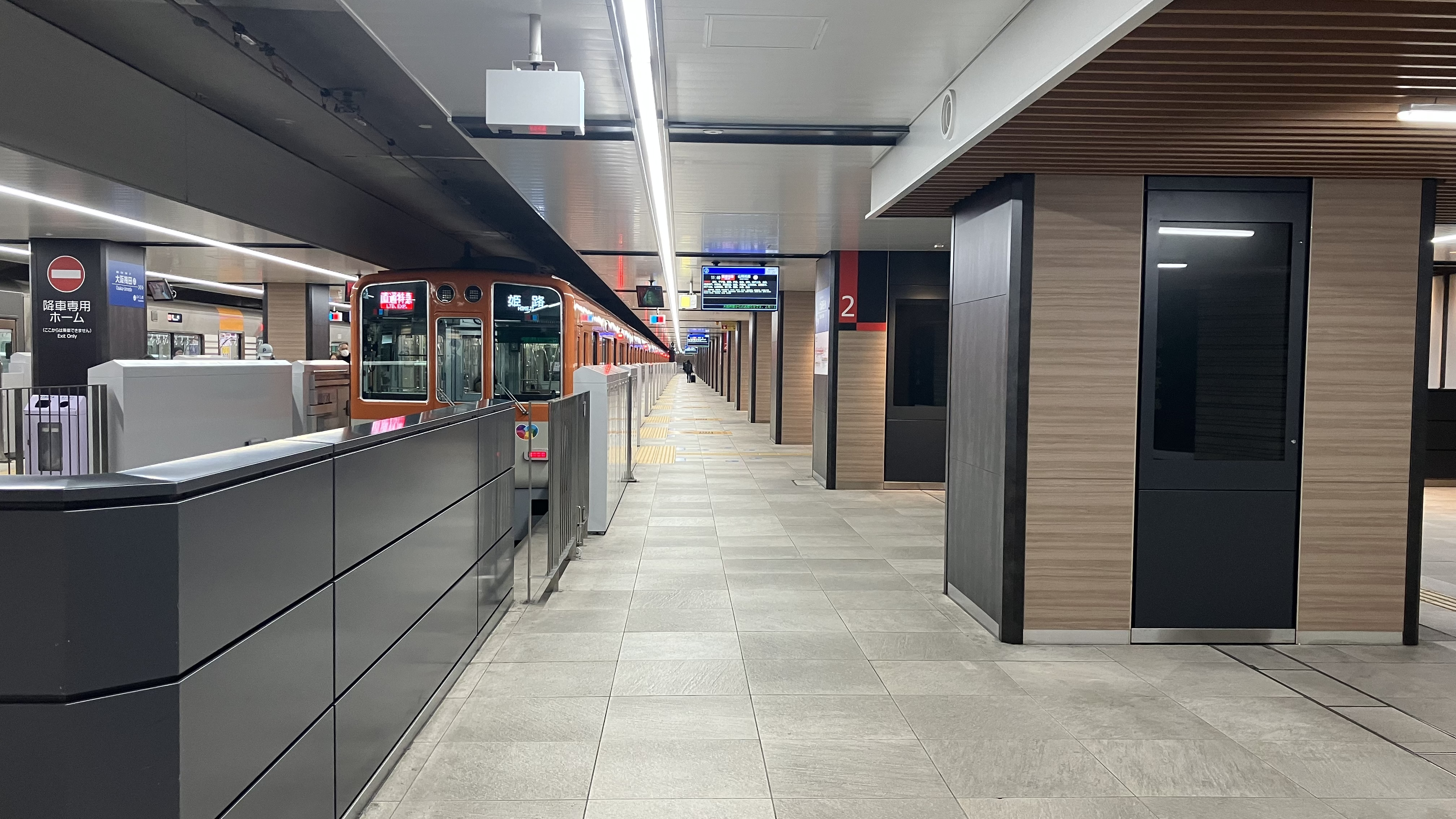
Platform 2

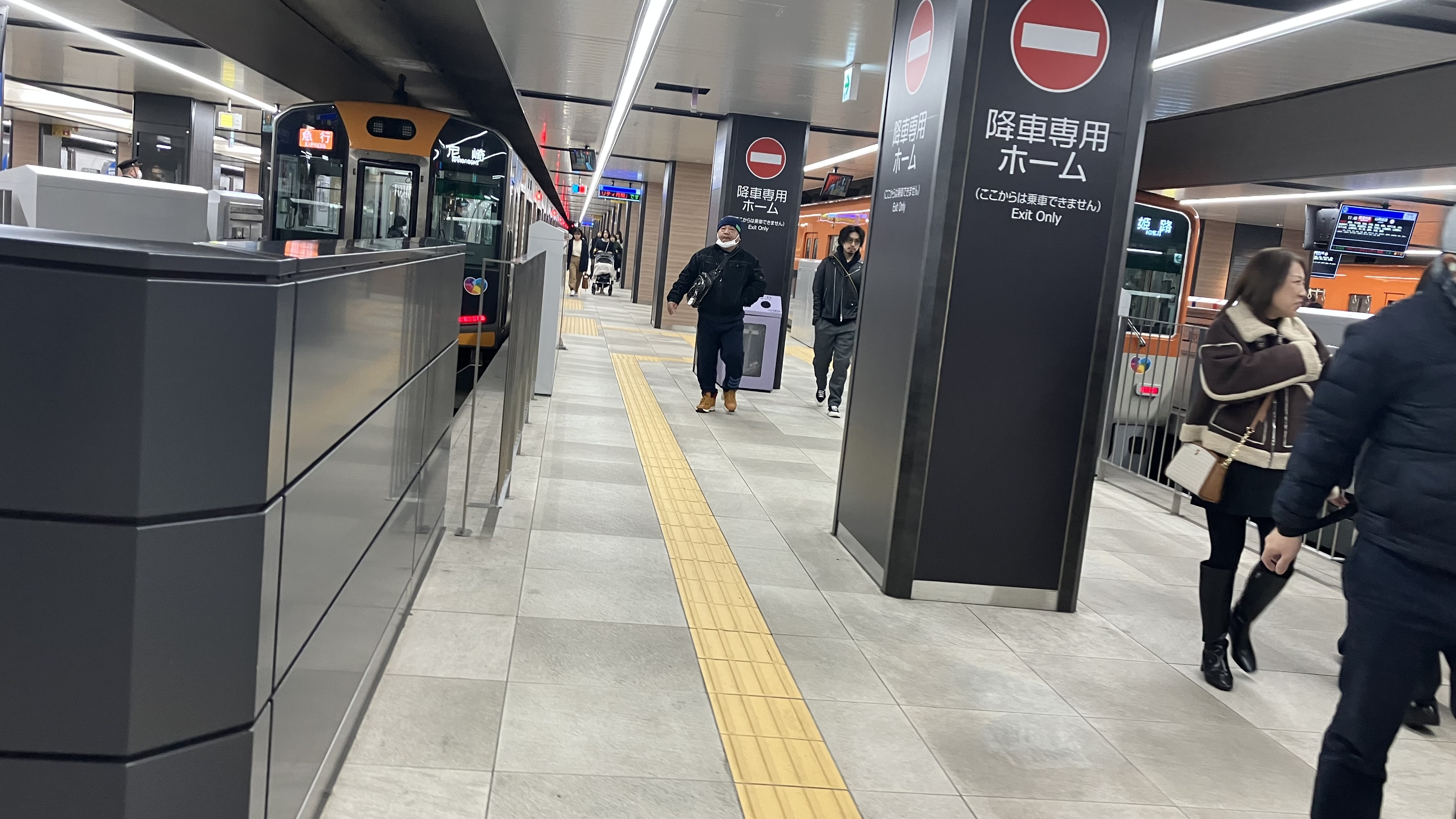
Line 2 and 3 drop-off platform

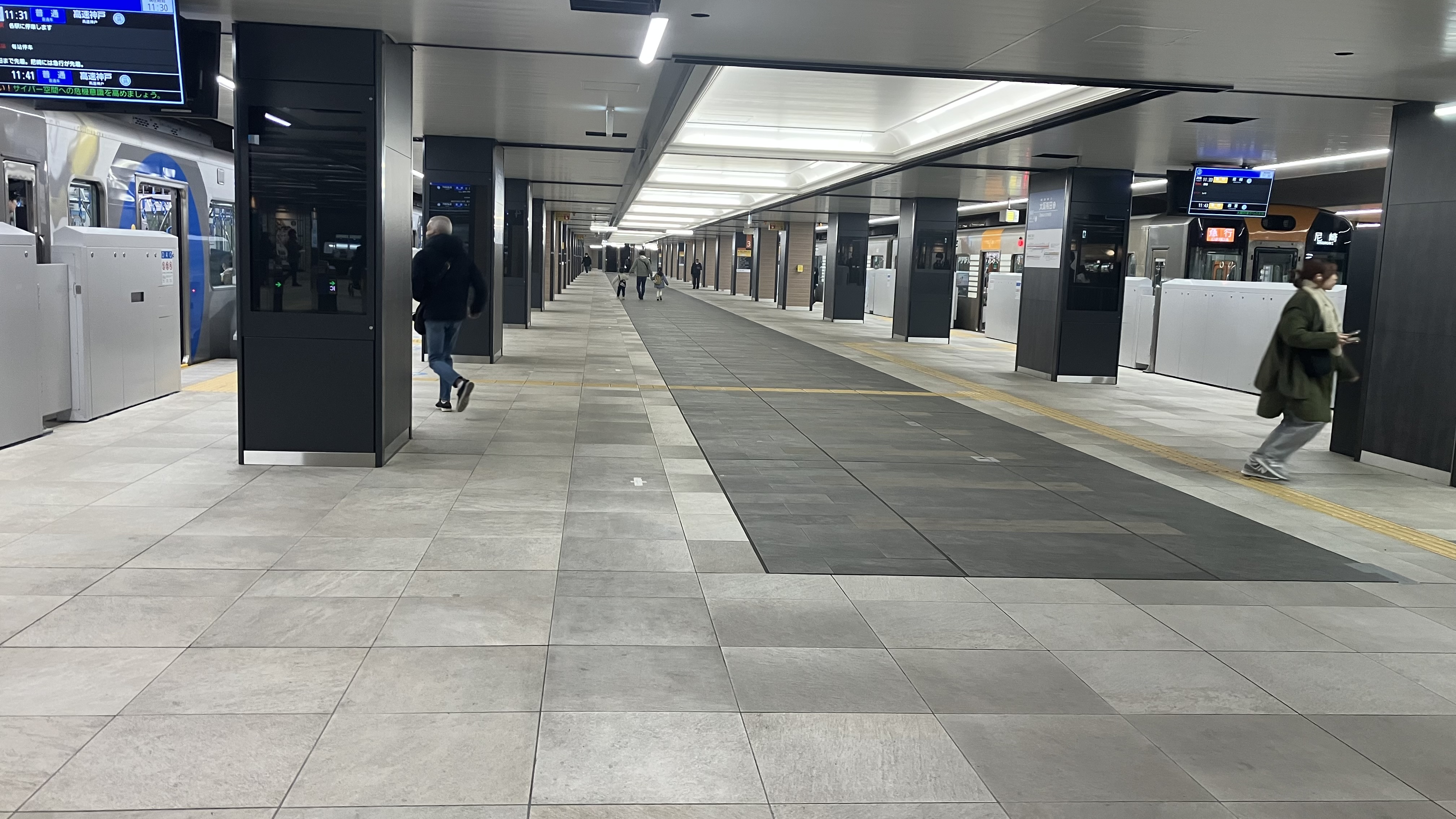
Platform 3 and 4

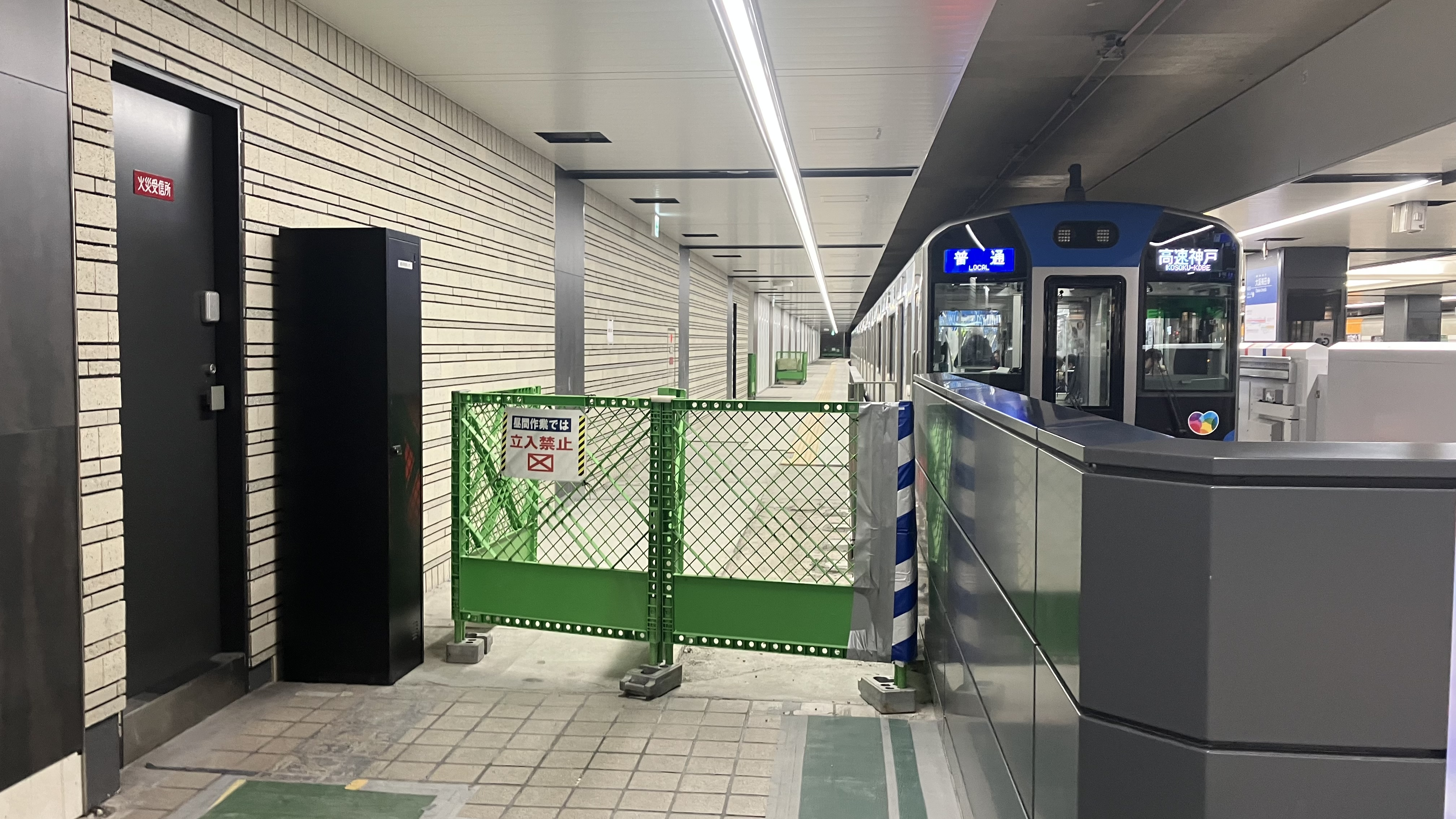
Line 4 drop-off platform

== Hankyu Railway ==
Osaka-umeda Station 大阪梅田駅
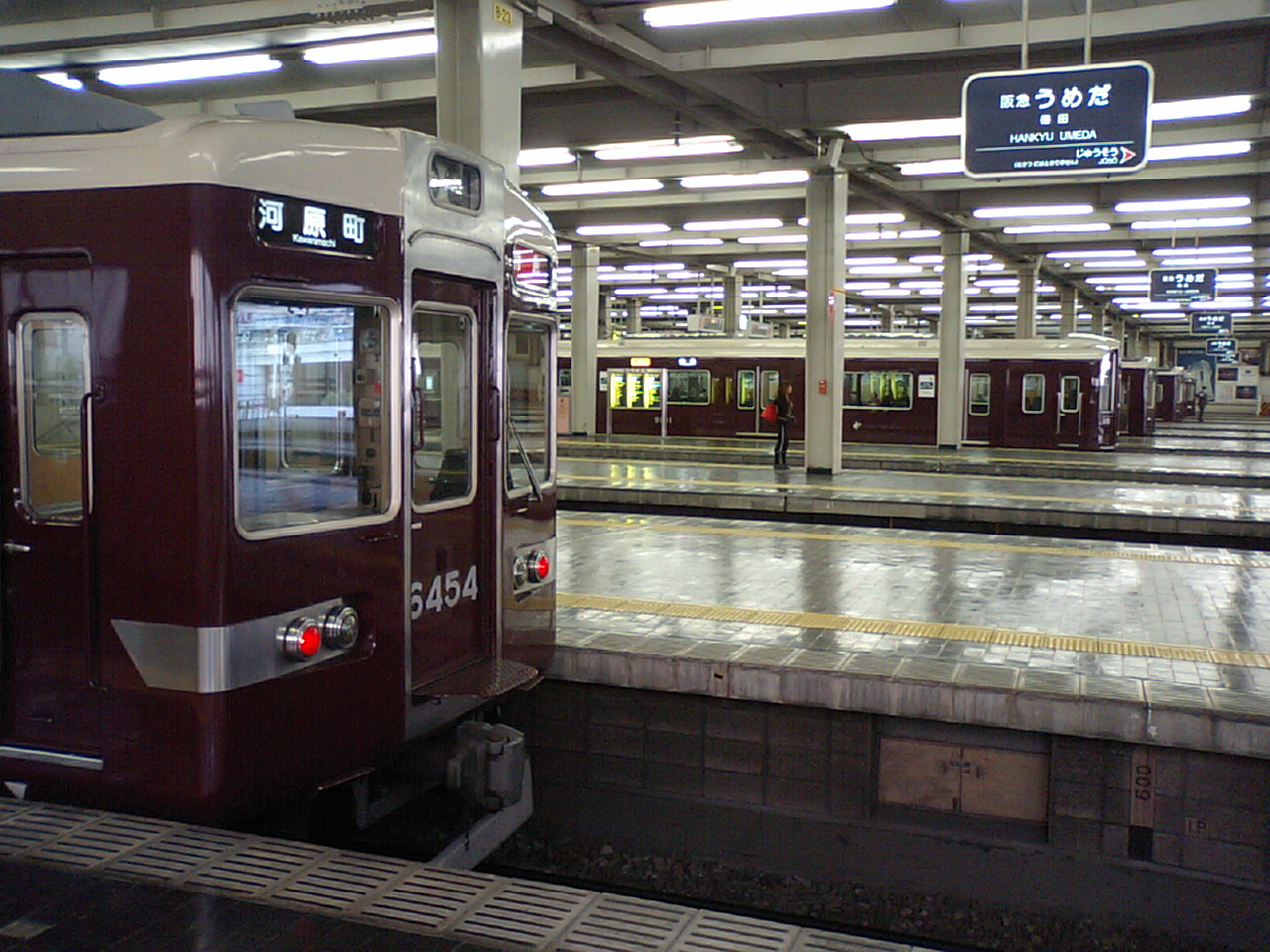
- Platforms of Hankyu Umeda Station

General information
- Location: 1-2, Shibata Itchōme, Kita-ku, Osaka, Osaka Prefecture; Japan
- Coordinates: 34°42′19.85″N 135°29′53.92″E
- System: Hankyu Railway station
- Operator: Hankyu Corporation
- Lines: Hankyu Kobe Line; Hankyu Takarazuka Line; Hankyu Kyoto Line

Other information
- Station code: HK-01

History
- Opened: 1910
Services
Preceding station	Hankyu Railway	Following station
Terminus	Kōbe Main Line Local	Nakatsu HK-02 towards Kobe-Sannomiya
Terminus	Kōbe Main Line Semi-Express	Nakatsu HK-02 One-way operation
Terminus	Kōbe Main Line Commuter Express Express Semi-Limited Express Commuter Limited Express Limited Express	Jūsō HK-03 towards Kobe-Sannomiya
Terminus	Takarazuka Main Line Local	Nakatsu HK-02 towards Takarazuka
Terminus	Takarazuka Main Line Semi-Express	Nakatsu HK-02 One-way operation
Terminus	Takarazuka Main Line Express	Jūsō HK-03 towards Takarazuka
Terminus	Takarazuka Main Line Commuter Limited Express	Jūsō HK-03 One-way operation
Terminus	Nissei Express	Jūsō HK-03 towards Nissei-chuo
Terminus	Kyōto Main Line Local Semi-Express Express Limited Express Semi-Limited Express Rapid Limited Express	Jūsō HK-03 towards Kyoto-kawaramachi
Location

The Umeda terminal of Hankyu Railway (officially Osaka-umeda Station, but commonly called Hankyu Osaka-umeda Station) is located northeast of Ōsaka Station.

The station first opened on March 10, 1910, as a ground-level station. The original location of the station was southeast of Ōsaka Station and the Hankyu (then Minoo-Arima Electric Tramway) tracks crossed the Tōkaidō Main Line by an overpass. The station was elevated on July 5, 1926.

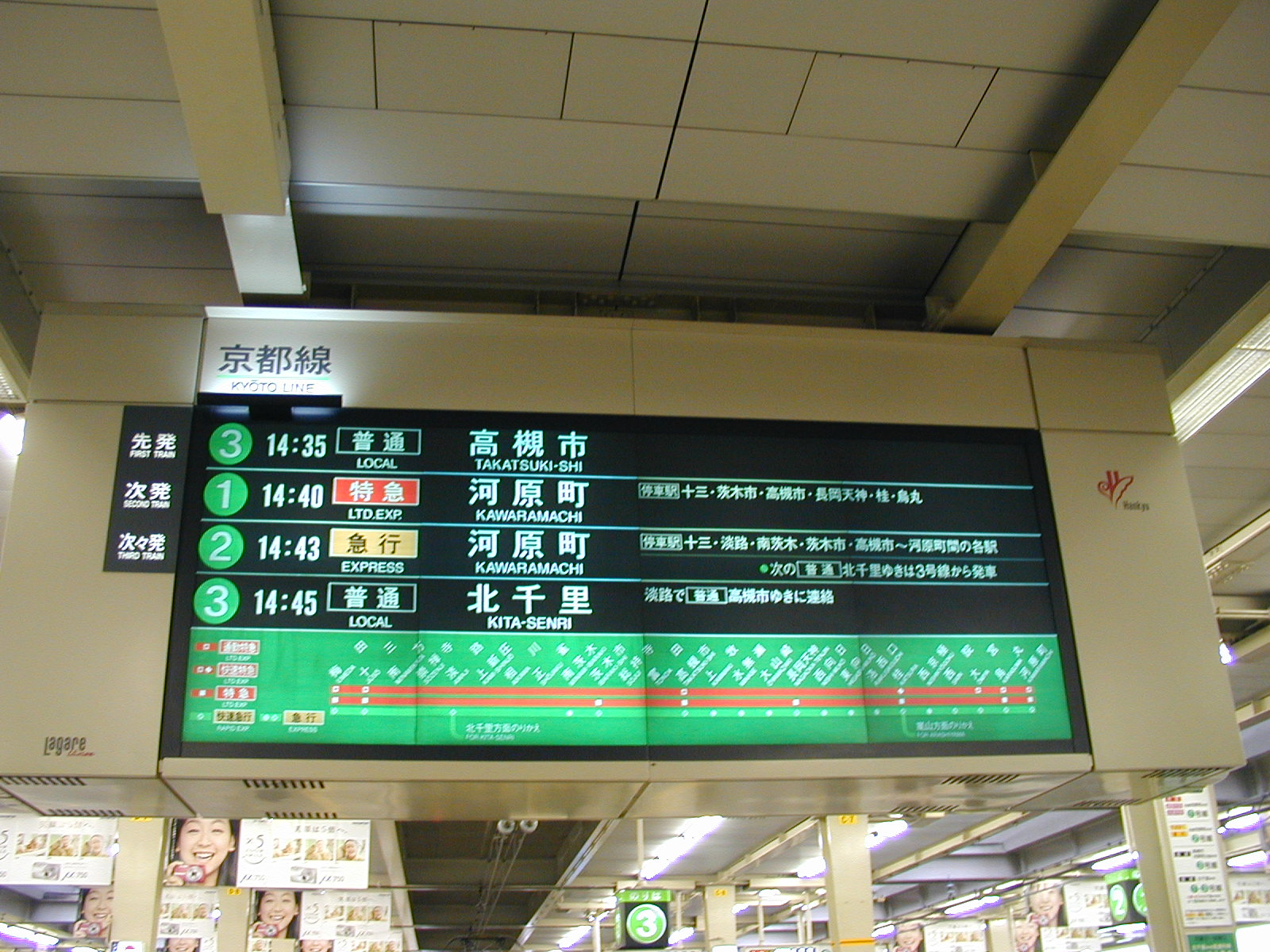
The former "Lagare Vision" screen of Hankyu Umeda Station

When Osaka Station was elevated in 1934, Hankyu's elevated tracks were forced to be removed and new Umeda Station was built to handle new ground-level tracks. The switching of tracks were carried out on June 1, 1934. This station facility was used until November 28, 1971, when the move of station to the present location was completed. This move was because of a sharp increase of transit, which forced Hankyu to operate 8-car trains. The existence of JNR tracks on the northern end of the 1934 station prevented the expansion of the station so that the station could not handle long trains.

After the opening of the current huge elevated station, spaces around and beneath the station, as well as the site of former station, were extensively redeveloped. One of the symbols of the commercial complex surrounding the station is the BIG MAN video screen above the Kinokuniya bookshop, common and necessary places to meet in this bustling railway station.

The Hankyu Department Store, built next to the station in 1929, was a pioneer of the successful business model of department stores run by urban railway companies in Japan. The store is still in business at the original location even after the move of the station (as of 2007, the reconstruction of the store building is in progress).

Station numbering was introduced to all Hankyu stations on 21 December 2013 with this station being designated as station number HK-01.

=== Layout ===
There are ten bay platforms serving nine tracks on the third floor. There are south ticket gates on the third floor and center ticket gates and on Chayamachi ticket gates on the second floor.

■Kyoto Line for Takatsuki-shi, Kyoto (Kawaramachi, Arashiyama) and Kita-Senri
1	■limited express trains ■local trains
2	■local trains (non rush-hour) ■commuter limited express trains (in the morning and the evening on weekdays) ■semi-limited express trains (in the morning and the evening)
3	■semi-express trains ■local trains (partly in the morning on weekdays) ■rapid limited express trains "Kyo-Train Garaku" (weekends and holidays only) ■express trains (late nights only)

■Takarazuka Line for Takarazuka, Hibarigaoka-Hanayashiki, Kawanishi-Noseguchi, Minoo and Nissei-Chūō
4	■express trains (every day) ■local trains (weekday morning rush hour only) ■limited express trains for Nissei-Chuo (weekday evening rush hour only)
5	■local trains (every day) ■express trains (weekday rush hour only)
6	■local trains (weekday rush hour only)

■Kobe Line for Nishinomiya-kitaguchi, Kobe-sannomiya, Kosoku Kobe and Shinkaichi
7	■local trains
8	■limited express trains (non-rush hour) ■express trains (in the morning on weekdays) ■commuter express trains (from the evening until night on weekdays) ■rapid trains (weekday evening rush hour only) ■local trains (every early morning and every night)
9	■limited express trains ■commuter limited express trains ■semi-limited express trains ■express trains ■local trains (every early morning and every night)

|}

== Osaka Metro ==
M 16 Umeda Station 梅田駅
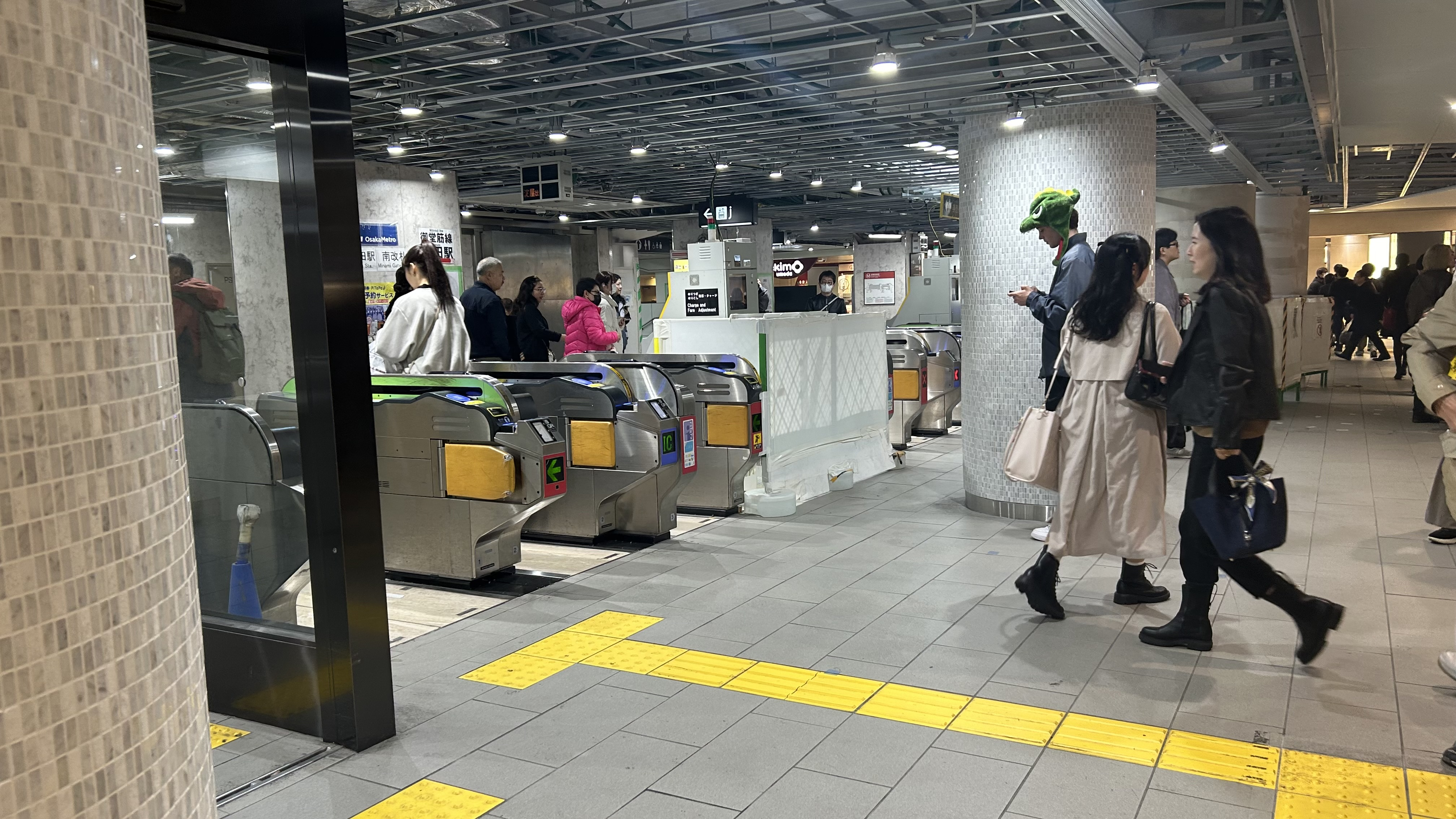
- Station mezzanine

General information
- Location: 8-6, Kakudachō, Kita-ku, Osaka, Osaka Prefecture; Japan
- Coordinates: 34°42′10.22″N 135°29′51.89″E
- System: Osaka Metro
- Operator: Osaka Metro
- Line: Midōsuji Line
- Platforms: 1 island platform
- Tracks: 2

Other information
- Station code: M 16

History
- Opened: May 20, 1933 (temporary station); October 6, 1935 (permanent station)
- Closed: October 5, 1935 (temporary station)
- Rebuilt: 1989

Passengers
- FY2016: 431,007 daily

Services
Preceding station	Osaka Metro	Following station
Nakatsu M 15 towards Esaka	Midōsuji Line	Yodoyabashi M 17 towards Nakamozu
Location

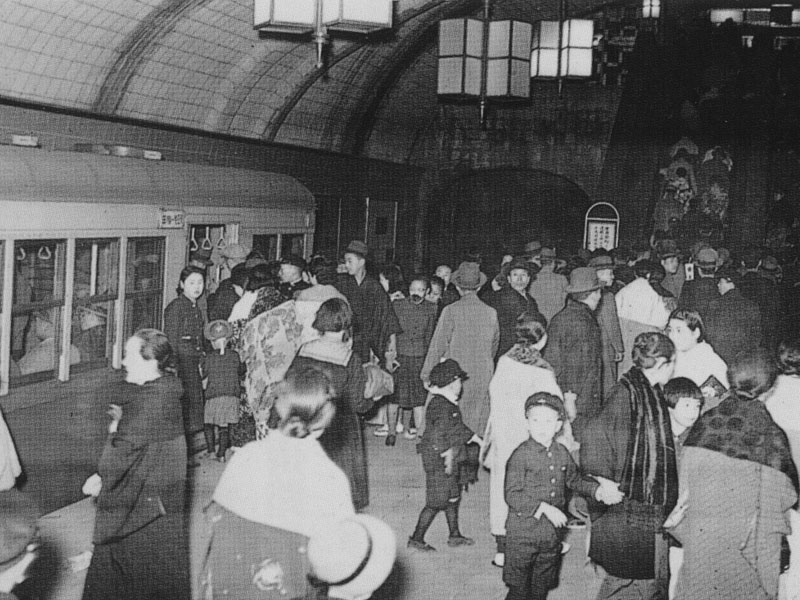
Platform in 1935

Umeda is the transferring point of three lines of the metro: the Midōsuji Line, the Tanimachi Line and the Yotsubashi Line. Among them, only the Midōsuji Line station is named Umeda, with the station number M16. The Tanimachi Line station is Higashi-Umeda (meaning "East Umeda") and the Yotsubashi Line station is Nishi-Umeda (meaning "West Umeda"). These three stations are connected with each other by underground walkways. Regular tickets of the subway, Surutto Kansai cards and IC cards are valid until the passenger gets out the ticket barrier of the station. The transfer between the three Umeda stations is an exception of this principle; the fare can be calculated as one travel as if the passengers do not exit the station provided the passengers transfer within 30 minutes.

Umeda Station on the Midōsuji Line started its operation on May 20, 1933, as a temporary station. The station was moved to the present location on October 6, 1935. Originally the station with an island platform and two tracks was built amid one tunnel, but on November 5, 1989, the station was expanded to a tunnel that existed next to the station (built for Tanimachi Line but due to change of plan remained unused for decades). The two tunnels are separated by a wall with some passages.

=== Layout ===
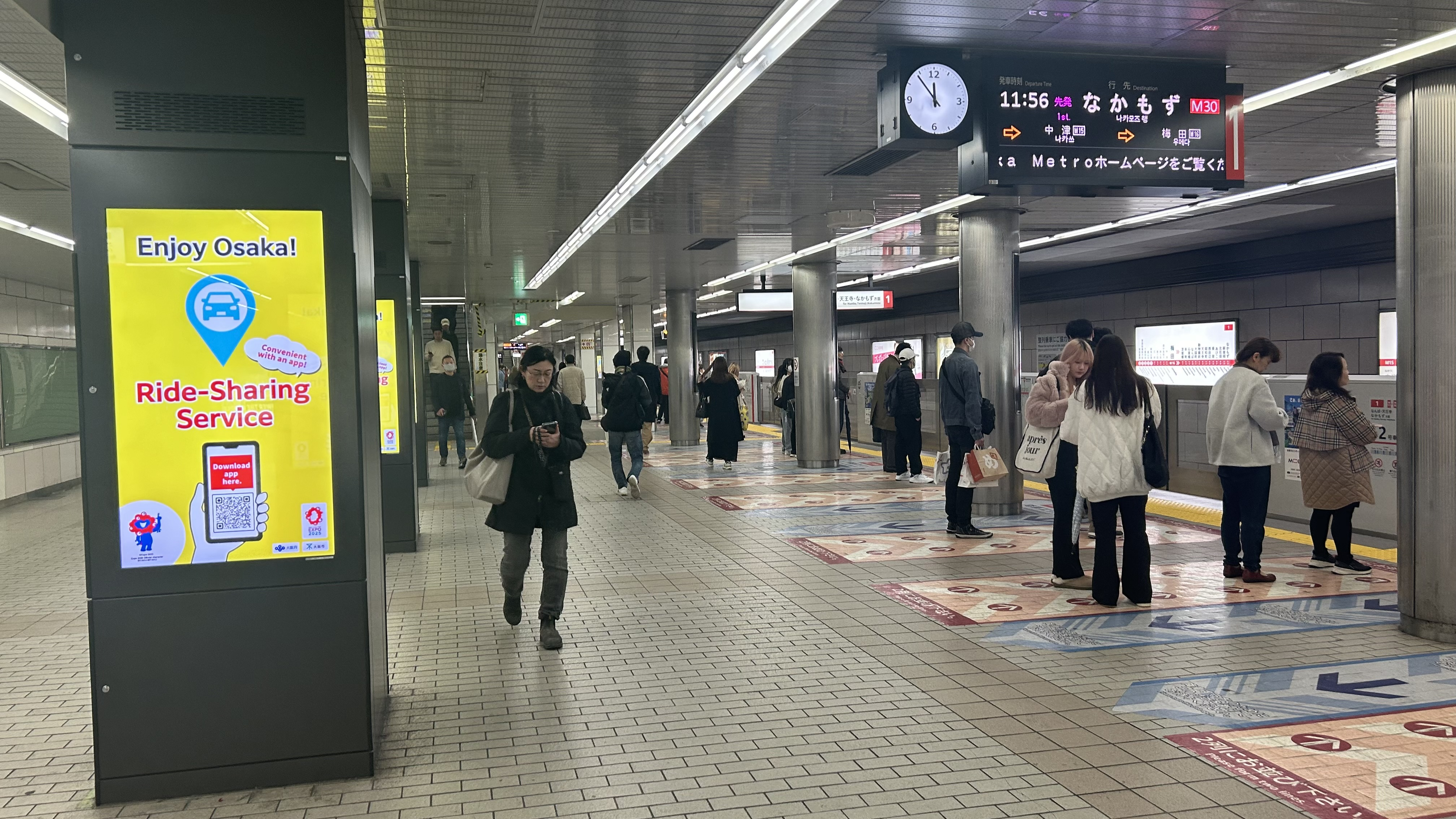
Platform 1 (for southbound trains)

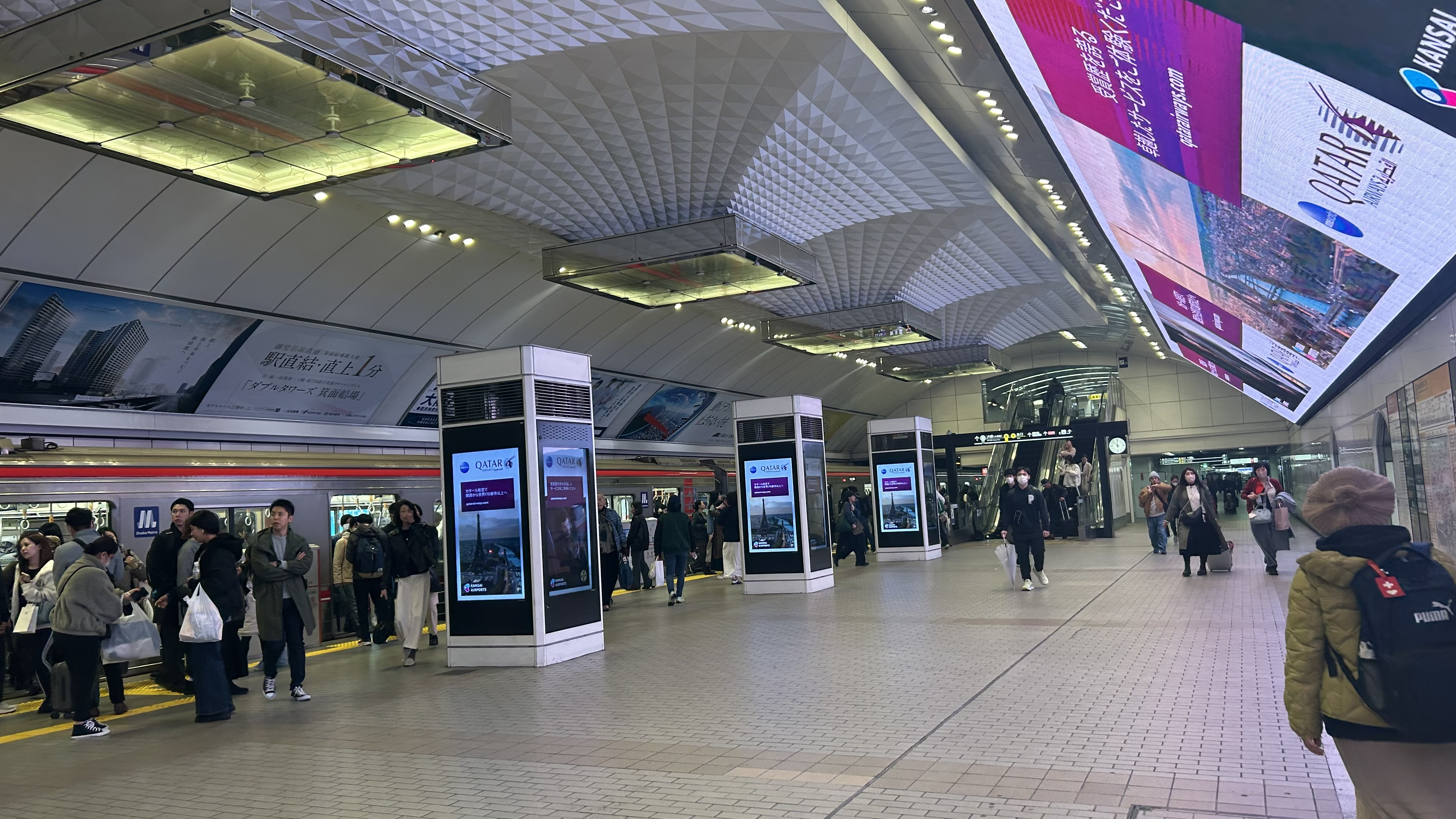
Platform 2 (for northbound trains)
- There is an island platform with two tracks on the second basement. There is a wall with passages in the center of the platform. On the upper level of the platform, there are north, center-north-west, center-north-east, center-south and south ticket gates.

G	Street Level	Exit/Entrance, connection to Hankyu lines
B1F	Mezzanine	Ticket gates, ticket/ICOCA/PiTaPa machines, station agent, shopping arcade, restrooms Passageways to Yotsubashi Line, Tanimachi Line, and Hanshin Main Line platforms
B2F; Platform level	Platform 1	Midōsuji Line towards Nakamozu (Yodoyabashi) →
B2F; Platform level	Half of island platform, doors will open on the right
B2F; Platform level	Half of island platform, doors will open on the right
B2F; Platform level	Platform 2	← Midōsuji Line towards Esaka (Nakatsu) (Through service to Minoh-kayano on the Kitakyu Namboku Line)

== Japan Freight Railway ==
Umeda Freight Terminal 梅田
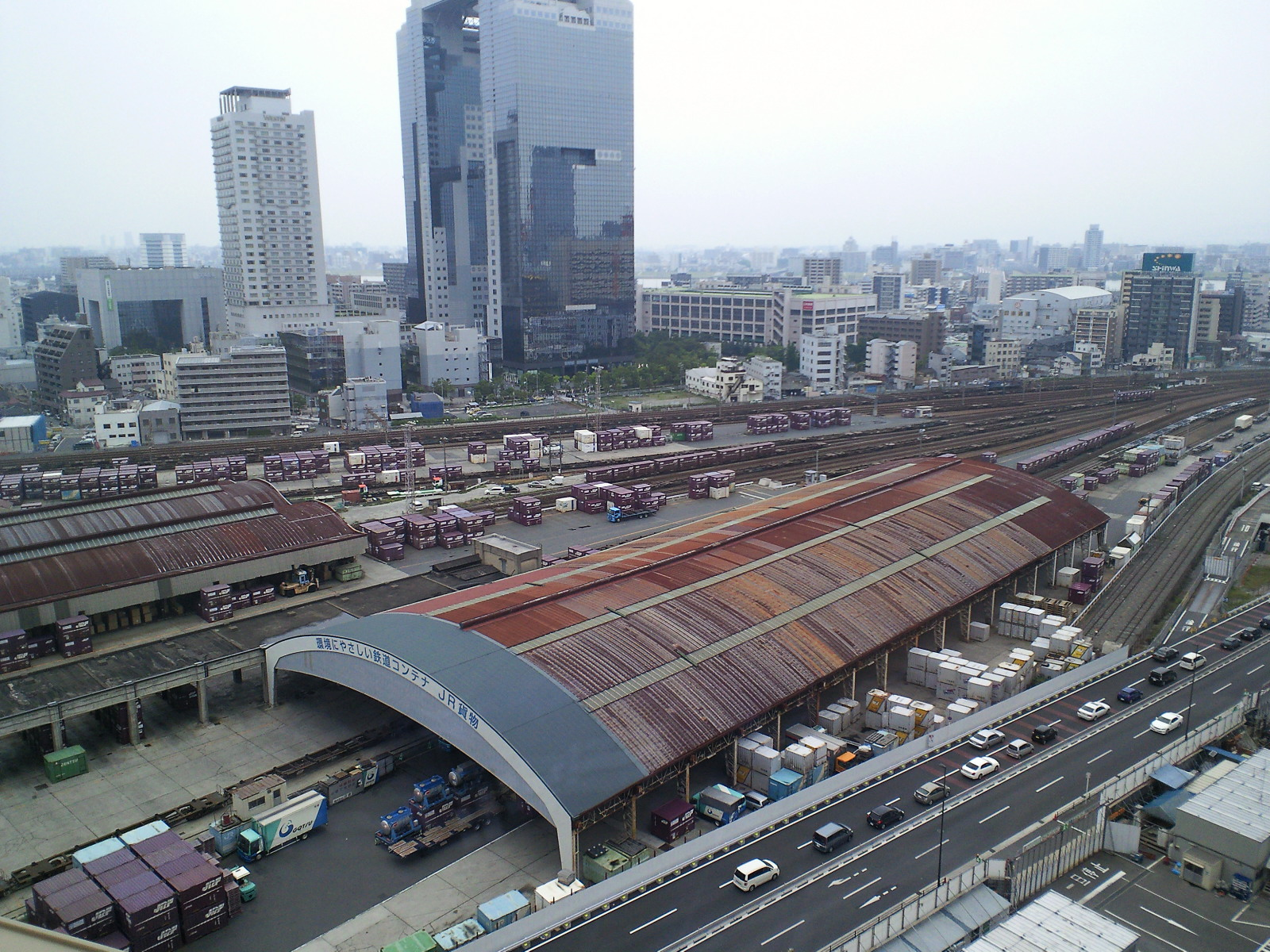
- Umeda Freight Terminal (12 June 2011)

General information
- Location: 2-25, Ōfukachō, Kita-ku, Osaka, Osaka Prefecture; Japan
- Coordinates: 34°42′13.38″N 135°29′35.63″E
- System: JR Freight terminal (closed)
- Operator: JR Freight
- Line: Tokaido Main Line Freight Branch (Umeda Freight Line)

History
- Opened: 1928
- Closed: 2013
Location

Umeda Freight Terminal of Japan Freight Railway Company (JR Freight) was a freight terminal on the Umeda Branchline (unofficial name) of the Tōkaidō Main Line owned by West Japan Railway Company (JR West). The station was built to separate freight services from Ōsaka Station and began operation on December 1, 1928. The yard of the terminal was located to the north, literally in the backyard, of the Ōsaka Station.

The freight terminal ceased to handle freight on March 16, 2013 and its function was succeeded by newly established Suita Freight Terminal and other nearby yards. The station was officially closed on March 31, 2013. The site, commonly called Ōsaka Station North Area (ja:大阪駅北地区, Ōsaka-eki Kita-chiku) or Ume-kita (うめきた), will be redeveloped.

A portion of the line was moved underground in 2023, resulting in an addition of underground passenger platforms at Ōsaka Station which was previously bypassed. The JR West Limited Express trains still use the freight line to transfer from the Osaka Loop Line to the JR Kyoto Line. No passenger trains had stopped at Umeda Freight Station itself.

«	Service	»
JR West Tōkaidō Line Branch (Umeda Freight Line)
Shin-Ōsaka	-	Ōsaka (2023-)

== Surrounding area ==
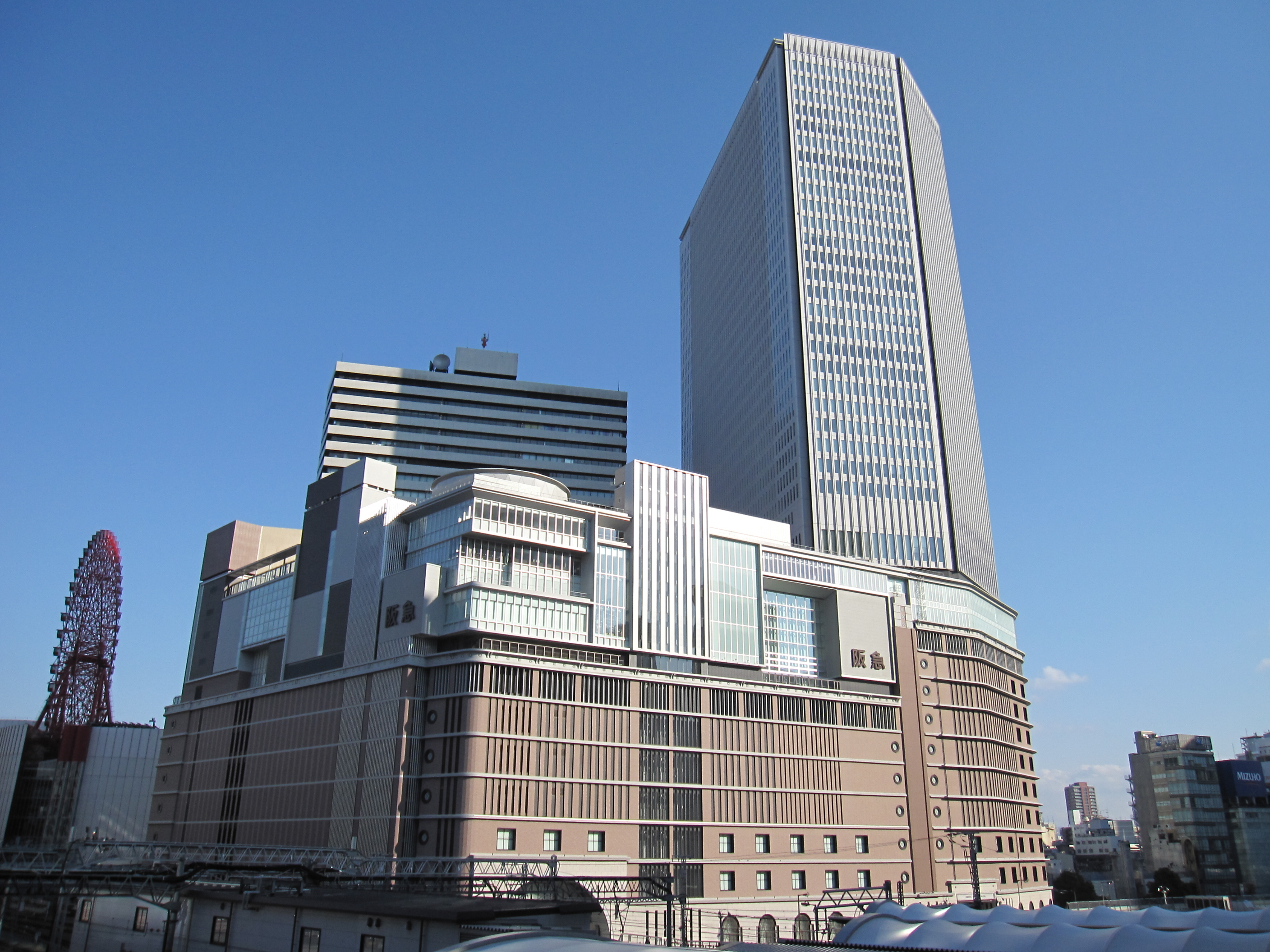
Hankyu Department Store

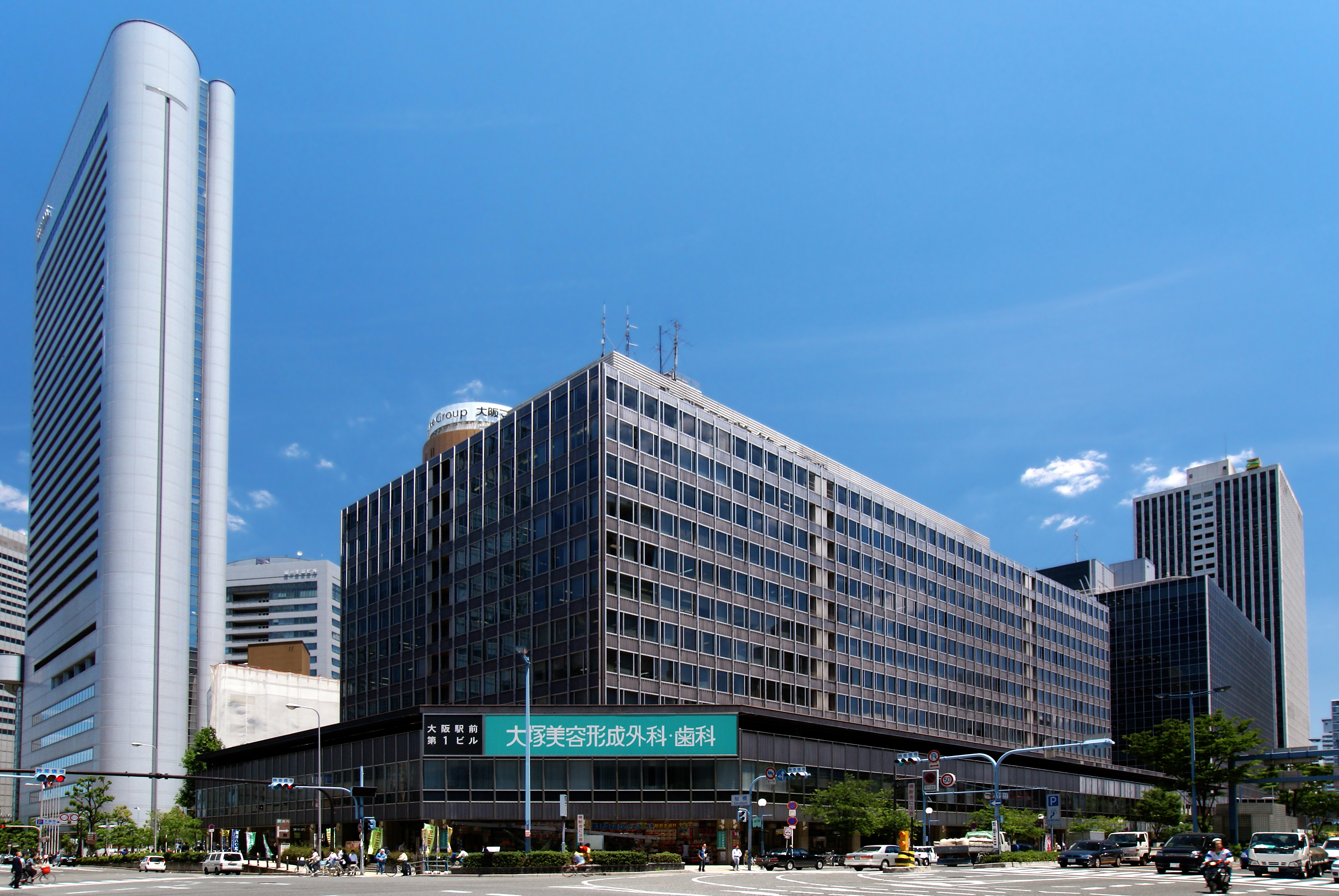
Hilton Osaka (left) and office buildings

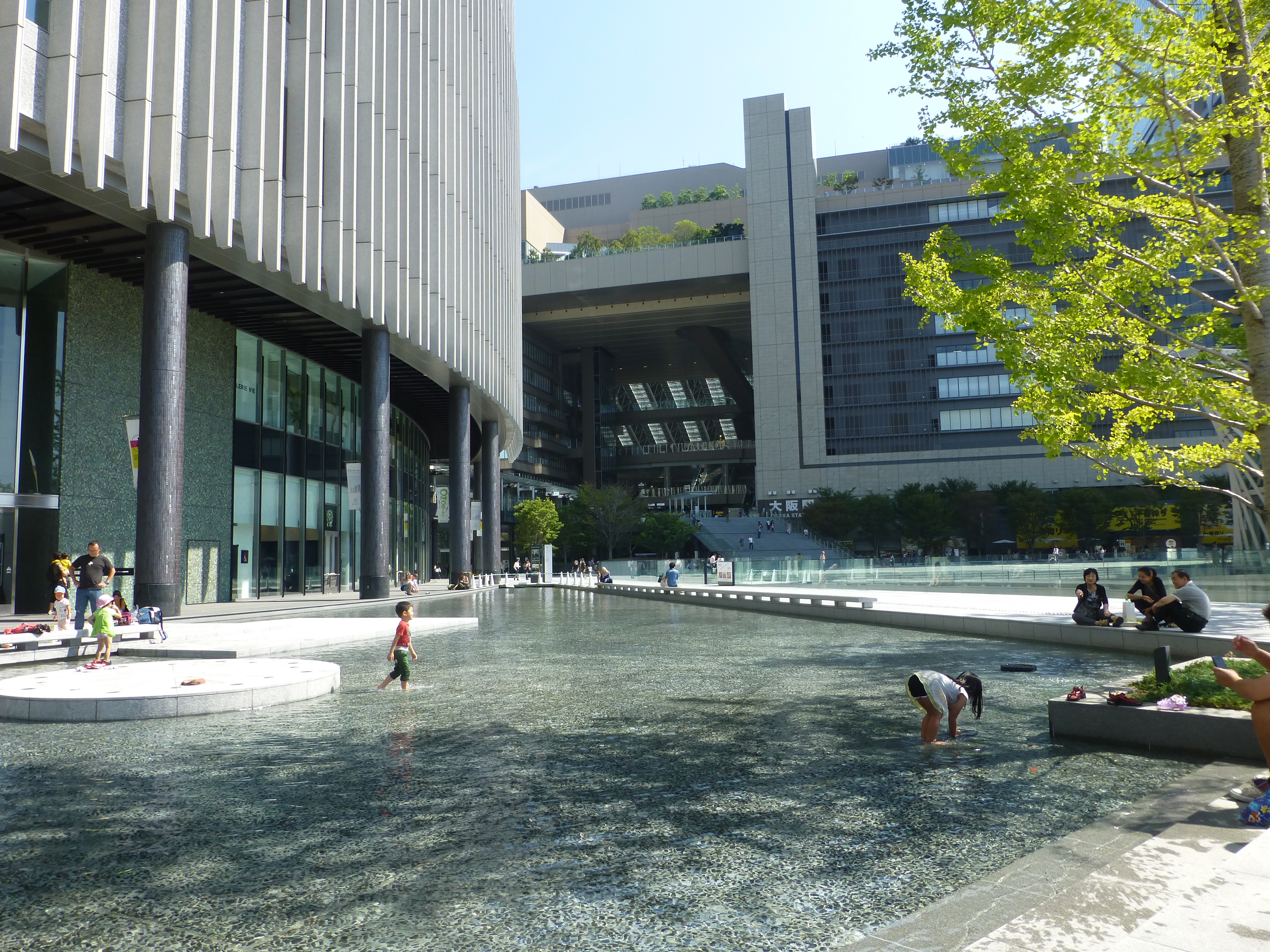
Umeda station north entry

- Hankyu Department Store, Hanshin Department Store (Both are owned by Hankyu Hanshin Department Stores, Inc.)
- HEP Navio
  - Hankyu Men's
  - TOHO Cinemas Umeda
- HEP Five
- Hankyu San-Bangai
  - Books Kinokuniya
- Hankyu Terminal Building
  - Hankyu 17 bangai
- Hankyu Grand Building
  - Hankyu 32 bandai
- Kitano Hankyu Building
  - D.D.House
- Shin-Hankyu Building
  - Shin-Hankyu Hachi-Bangai
- Hankyu Kappa Yokocho
- Hankyu Kosho no Machi
- Sonezaki Police Station
- Asahiya Shoten
- EST
- South Gate Building
  - Daimaru Umeda
  - Pokémon Center Osaka
  - Hotel Granvia Osaka
- North Gate Building
  - Lucua
  - JR Osaka Isetan-Mitsukoshi
  - Osaka Station City Cinema
  - ITOCHU
- Umeda Center Building
  - the headquarters of Daikin Industries, Ltd.
  - the headquarters of NTT Data Sekisui Systems Corporation
  - Animate Umeda
- Yodobashi Umeda (Yodobashi Camera Multimedia Umeda, Comme Ça Store, etc.)
  - Links Umeda
  - Hotel Hankyu Respire Osaka
- Chayamachi Applause
  - Umeda Arts Theater
  - Hotel Hankyu International
- NU Chayamachi
- Chaska Chayamachi
  - Maruzen & Junkudo Umeda
- Mainichi Broadcasting System, Inc. (MBS)
- Umeda Loft
- Osaka Marubiru
- Umeda DT Tower
- E-MA
- Diamor Osaka
- Whity Umeda
- the Hilton Plaza East
  - Hilton Osaka
  - Junkudo Umeda
- the Hilton Plaza West
- Osaka Garden City
    - the Ritz-Carlton Osaka
    - Osaka Shiki Theatre
    - Billboard live Osaka
- Shin Umeda City
  - Umeda Sky Building
  - the Westin Osaka

== See also ==
- List of railway stations in Japan
- Ōsaka Station
- Namba Station
- Transport in Keihanshin
