= Minamikata Station (Osaka) =

Railway station in Osaka, Japan

Coordinates: 34°43′33″N 135°29′57″E

Minamikata Station 南方駅
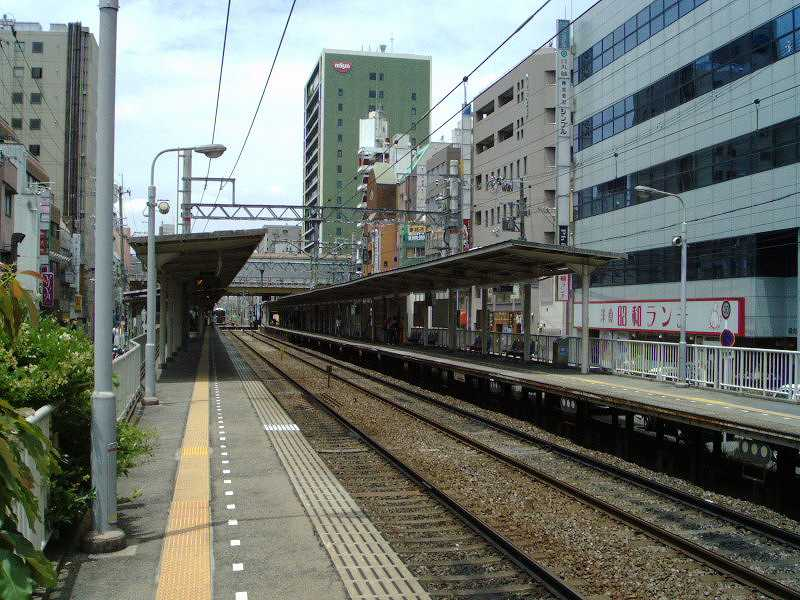
- Minamikata Station

General information
- Location: Yodogawa-ku, Osaka; Japan
- Operator: Hankyu
- Line: Hankyu Kyoto Main Line
- Platforms: 2 - Side Platforms
- Tracks: 2

Other information
- Station code: HK-61

History
- Opened: 1 April 1921
Location

Minamikata Station (南方駅, Minamikata-eki; station number: HK-61) is a train station on the Hankyu Kyoto Line located in Yodogawa-ku, Osaka, Japan. It also serves as an interchange for Nishinakajima-Minamigata Station on the Osaka Municipal Subway Midosuji Line.

== Connecting line from Minamikata ==
- Osaka Municipal Subway Midosuji Line (Nishinakajima-Minamigata Station)

== Layout ==
2 side platforms serve 2 tracks on the ground level.

| 1 | ■ Kyoto Line | for Kyoto (Kawaramachi, Arashiyama) and Kita-Senri |
| 2 | ■ Kyoto Line | for Umeda, Kobe and Takarazuka |

== History ==
The station was opened by Kita-Osaka Electric Railway on 1 April 1921.

Station numbering was introduced to all Hankyu stations on 21 December 2013 with this station being designated as station number HK-61.

== Stations next to Minamikata ==
| « | Service | » |
Hankyu Kyoto Main Line (HK-61)
| Jūsō (HK-03) | Local | Sōzenji (HK-62) |
| Jūsō (HK-03) | Semi-Express | Awaji (HK-63) |
| Jūsō (HK-03) | Express | Awaji (HK-63) |
Semi limited Express: Does not stop at this station
Limited Express: Does not stop at this station
Commutation Limited Express: Does not stop at this station
Rapid Limited Express "Kyo-Train Garaku", "Sagano", "Atago", "Togetsu": Does not stop at this station
