= Sōzenji Station =

Railway station in Osaka, Japan

Coordinates: 34.7312°N 135.5104°E

Sozenji Station 崇禅寺駅
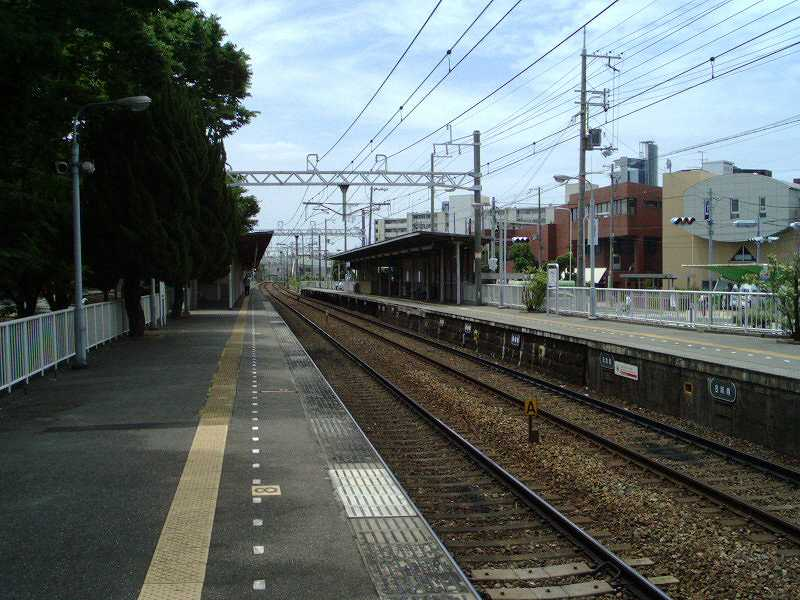
- Sozenji Station platforms

General information
- Location: Yodogawa-ku, Osaka; Japan
- Operator: Hankyu
- Line: Hankyu Kyoto Main Line
- Platforms: 2 - Side Platforms
- Tracks: 2

Other information
- Station code: HK-62

History
- Opened: 1 April 1921

Services
Preceding station	Hankyu Railway	Following station
Minamikata towards Osaka-umeda	Kyōto Main Line Local	Awaji towards Kyoto-kawaramachi
Location

Sōzenji Station (崇禅寺駅, Sōzenji-eki; station number: HK-62) is a train station on the Hankyu Kyoto Line located in Higashiyodogawa-ku, Osaka, Japan. Sōzenji Station is the least used station on the Hankyu Kyoto Line.

== Layout ==
Two side platforms serving two tracks.

north side	■ Kyoto Line	for Kyoto (Kawaramachi, Arashiyama) and Kita-Senri
south side	■ Kyoto Line	for Umeda, Kobe, and Takarazuka

== History ==
The station was opened by Kita-Osaka Electric Railway on April 1, 1921.

Station numbering was introduced to all Hankyu stations on 21 December 2013 with this station being designated as station number HK-62.

=== Future plans ===
Construction is underway for grade separation. Work is being done as of 2019 to elevate a 3.3 km (2.1 mi) section of the Kyoto Line between this station and Kami-Shinjō Station. Originally planned to be opened by 2020, various delays have resulted in the opening being pushed to 2031.

== Surrounding area ==
- Nakajima Soja
- Sozen-ji
- Kunijima Purification Plant (Osaka City Waterworks Bureau)
- Kunijima Station (Senri Line)
- Osaka Prefectural Kunijima High School
- Osaka Municipal Nakajima Junior High School
- Osaka Municipal Keihatsu Elementary School
- Osaka Municipal Higashiyodogawa Gymnasium
- Yodogawa Christian Hospital
