= Aikawa Station (Osaka) =

Railway station in Osaka, Japan

Aikawa Station 相川駅
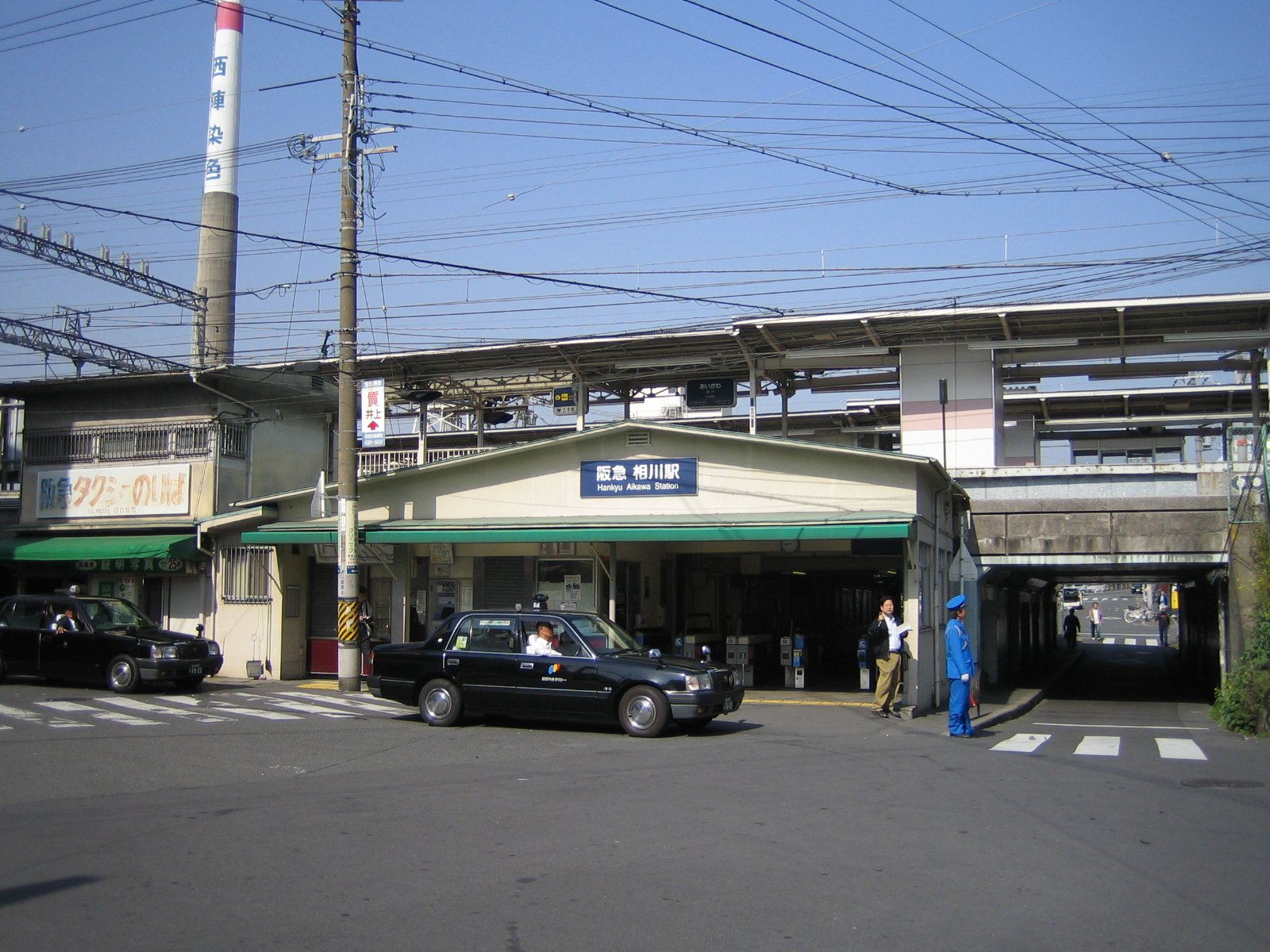

General information
- Location: Higashiyodogawa-ku, Osaka; Japan
- Coordinates: 34°45′29″N 135°32′02″E
- Operated by: Hankyu Railway
- Line(s): Hankyu Kyoto Main Line
- Tracks: 4

Construction
- Structure type: Elevated
- Accessible: Yes

Other information
- Station code: HK-65

History
- Opened: 28 January 1916

Aikawa Station (相川駅, Aikawa-eki) is a railway station on the Hankyu Railway Kyoto Line located in Higashiyodogawa-ku, Osaka Prefecture, Japan.

== Layout ==
The station has 2 elevated island platforms, serving 2 tracks each. Local trains for Takatsuki-shi arrive at Line 1 during the non-rush hour to let Kyoto-bound limited express trains pass Line 2.

1, 2	■ Kyoto Line	for Takatsuki-shi and Kyoto (Kawaramachi)
3, 4	■ Kyoto Line	for Umeda, Tengachaya, Kita-Senri, Kobe, and Takarazuka

== History ==
Aikawa Station opened on 28 January 1916.

Station numbering was introduced to all Hankyu stations on 21 December 2013 with this station being designated as station number HK-65.

== Stations next to Aikawa ==
«	Service	»
Kami-Shinjō (HK-64)	Local	Shōjaku (HK-66)
Others: Does not stop at this station
