= Awaji Station =

Railway station in Osaka, Japan

Coordinates: 34.738844°N 135.516508°E

Awaji Station 淡路駅
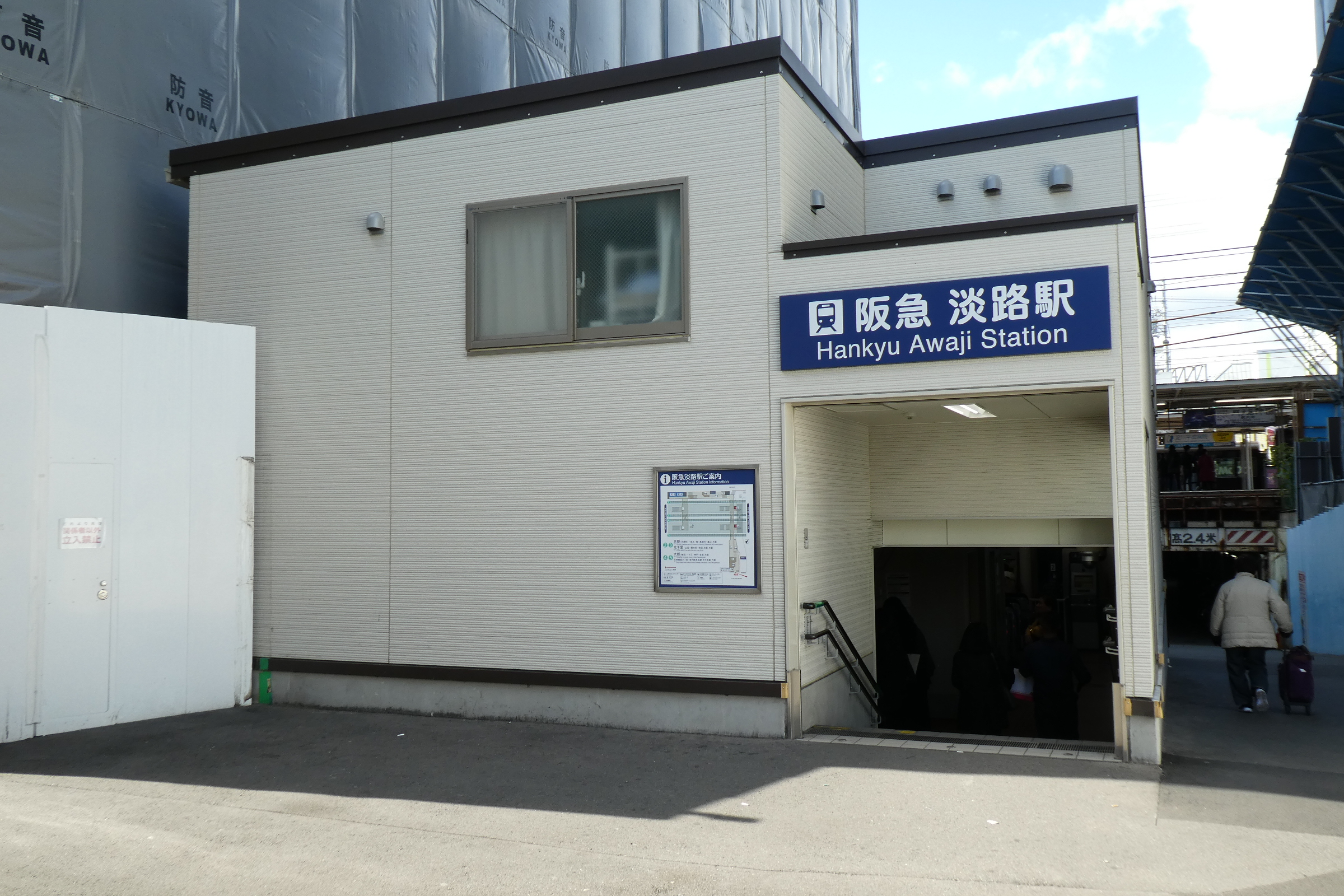
- Temporary east exit in November 2019

General information
- Location: Higashiawaji Yonchome, Higashiyodogawa, Osaka, Osaka （大阪市東淀川区東淡路四丁目） Japan
- Operator: Hankyu Railway
- Lines: Kyoto Main Line; Senri Line
- Connections

Other information
- Station code: HK-63

History
- Opened: April 1, 1921
Services
Preceding station	Hankyu Railway	Following station
Sōzenji HK-62 towards Osaka-umeda	Kyōto Main Line Local	Kami-Shinjō HK-64 towards Kyoto-kawaramachi
Minamikata HK-61 towards Osaka-umeda	Kyōto Main Line Semi-Express Express	Kami-Shinjō HK-64 towards Kyoto-kawaramachi
Jūsō HK-03 towards Osaka-umeda	Kyōto Main Line Semi-Limited Express Limited Express	Ibaraki-shi HK-69 towards Kyoto-kawaramachi
Jūsō HK-03 towards Osaka-umeda	Kyōto Main Line Kyo-Train Garaku Sagano Atago Togetsu	Katsura HK-81 towards Kyoto-kawaramachi
through to Senri Line	Kyōto Main Line Hozu	Katsura HK-81 towards Kyoto-kawaramachi
Kunijima HK-87 towards Tenjimbashisuji Rokuchōme	Senri Line Local	Shimo-Shinjō HK-88 towards Kita-Senri
Tenjimbashisuji Rokuchōme K 11 Terminus	Senri Line Semi-Express Hozu	through to Kyoto Line
Location

Awaji Station (淡路駅, Awaji-eki) is a railway station in Higashiyodogawa-ku, Osaka, Japan, operated by the private operator Hankyu Railway.

== Lines ==
Awaji Station is an intersection of the following two Hankyu Railway lines:

- Hankyu Senri Line
- Hankyu Kyoto Line

In March 2019, the nearby JR-Awaji Station of the Osaka Higashi Line owned by West Japan Railway Company (JR West) has been inaugurated.

== Station layout ==
This station has two island platforms with four tracks at ground level.

Track layout of Awaji Station
	Kita-Senri ↑
Osaka-umeda ←		→ Kawaramachi, Arashiyama
	↓ Tenjimbashisuji rokuchōme, Tengachaya

=== Platforms ===
2, 3	■ Hankyu Kyoto Main Line	for Kyoto (Kawaramachi, Arashiyama) and Takatsuki-shi
2, 3	■ Hankyu Senri Line	for Kita-Senri
4, 5	■ Hankyu Kyoto Main Line	for Osaka-umeda, Kobe and Takarazuka
4, 5	■ Hankyu Senri Line	for Tenjimbashisuji Rokuchome and Tengachaya

== History ==
Awaji Station opened on 1 April 1921.

Station numbering was introduced to all Hankyu stations on 21 December 2013 with this station being designated as station number HK-63.

=== Future plans ===
As of 2025, work is being done to elevate a 7.1 km (4.4 mi) X-shaped section of track from Sōzenji Station to Kami-Shinjō Station on the Kyoto Line and from Kunijima Station to Shimo-Shinjō Station on the Senri Line (including Awaji station from which the aforementioned stations are adjacent stations). Construction began in 2008 and was expected to be completed in 2017 with full operation on the elevated tracks beginning in 2020. However in 2015 it was determined that the original completion date can not be achieved, and the finish date was pushed back to 2024 with operations beginning that year. Later, the completion date was pushed back to 2027. In 2022, Osaka City estimated that the project would not be completed until 2031 owing to the effects of the COVID-19 pandemic as well as delays in land acquisition. As a result of the delays, the cost of the project has increased by as much as ¥69 billion (2021) (equivalent to ¥75 billion or US$496 million in 2024).

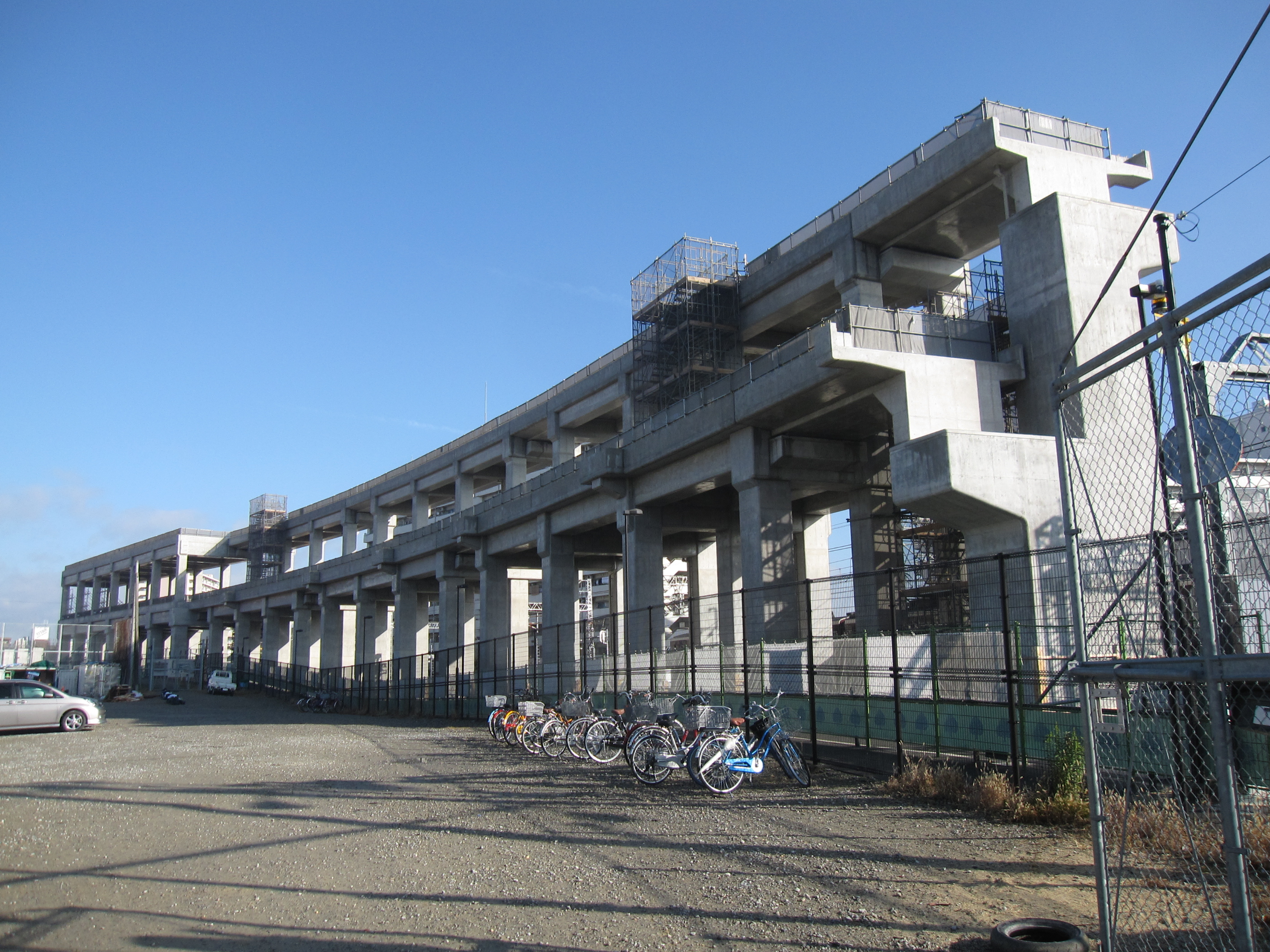
Elevated guideway of the Senri line under construction in 2012

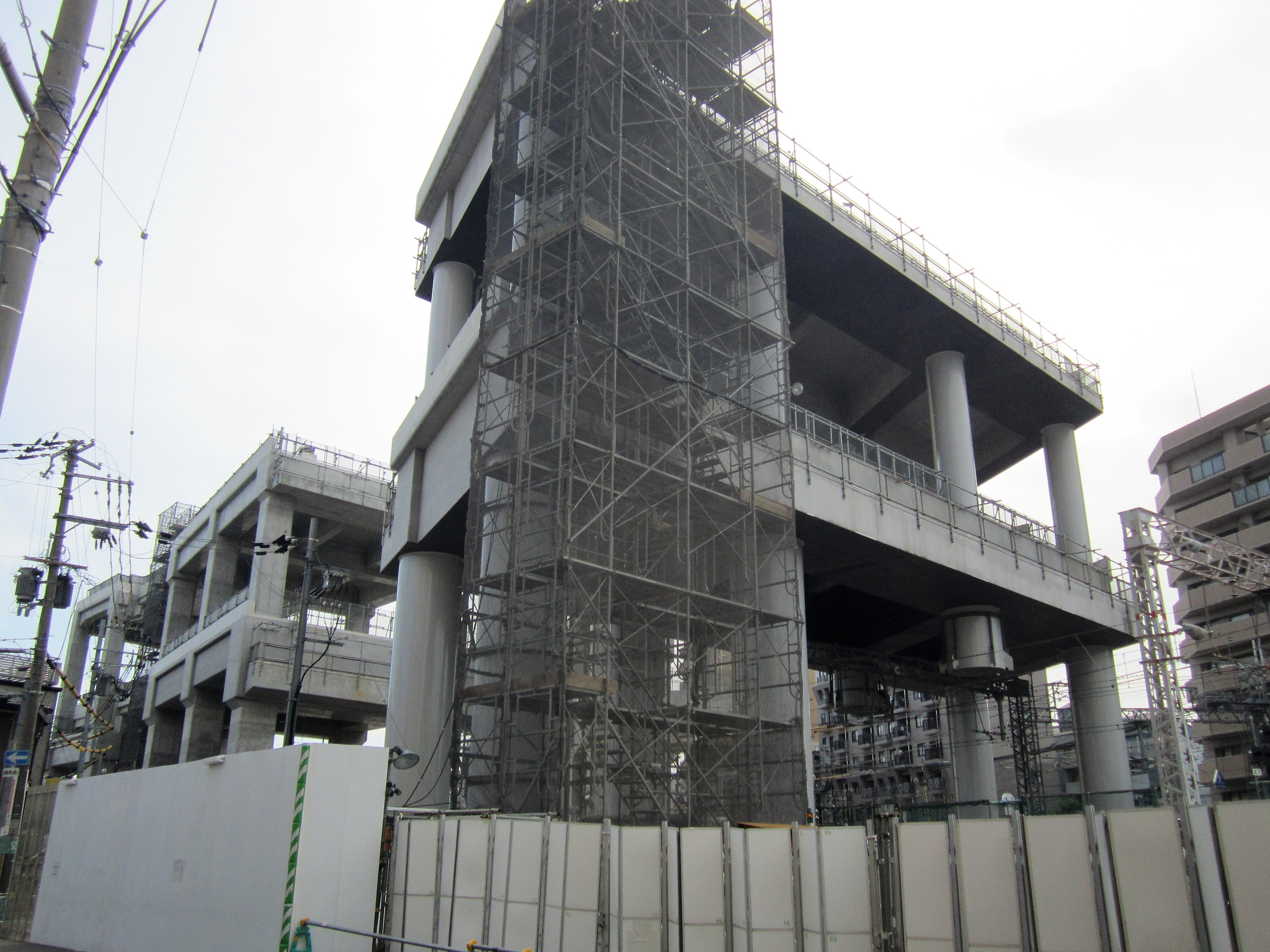
Construction of the elevated station structure in 2019

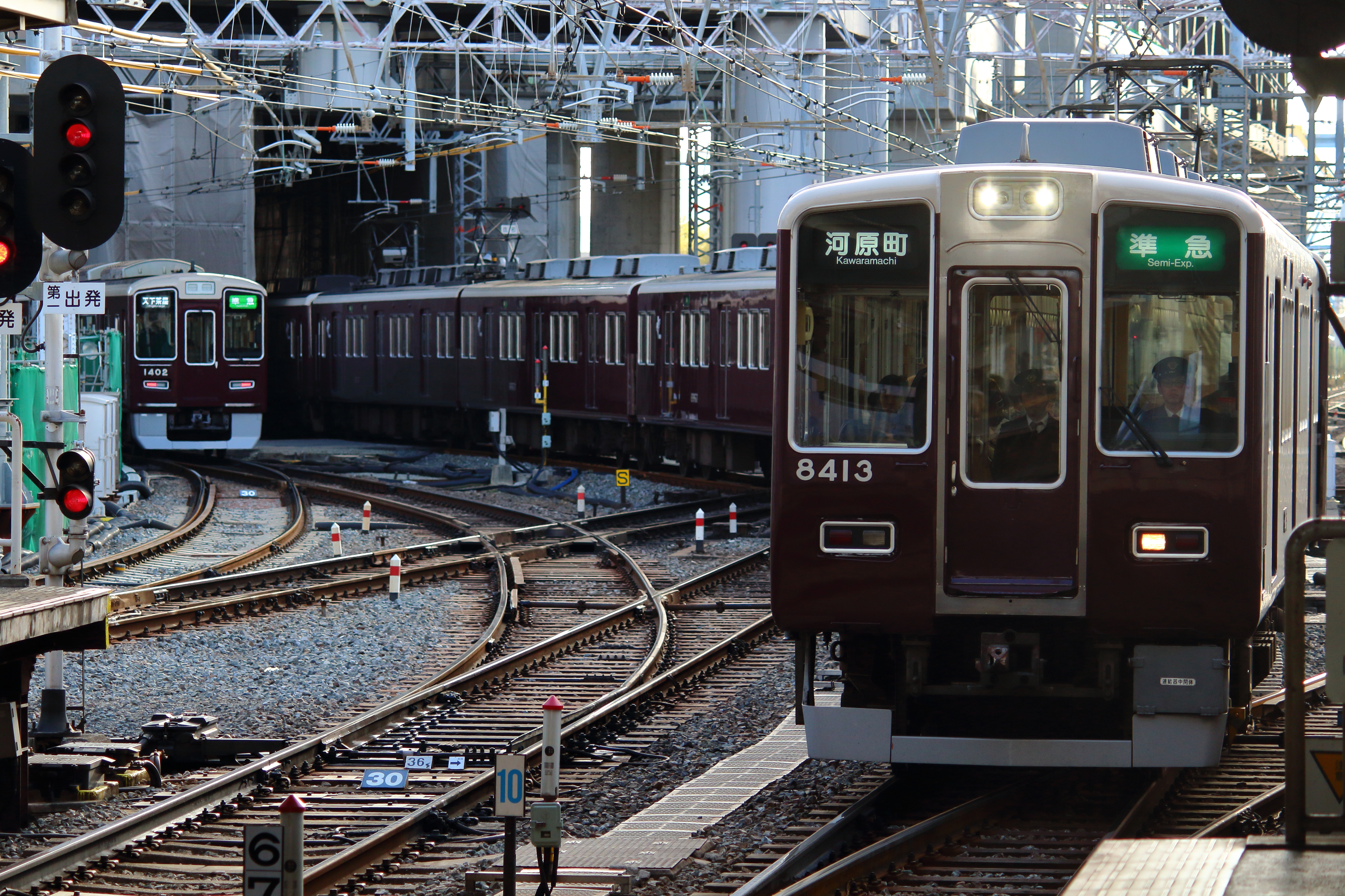
View of construction in the background as a northbound train enters the station
