= Kami-Shinjō Station =

Railway station in Osaka, Japan

Coordinates: 34.7508°N 135.5330°E

Kami-Shinjō Station 上新庄駅
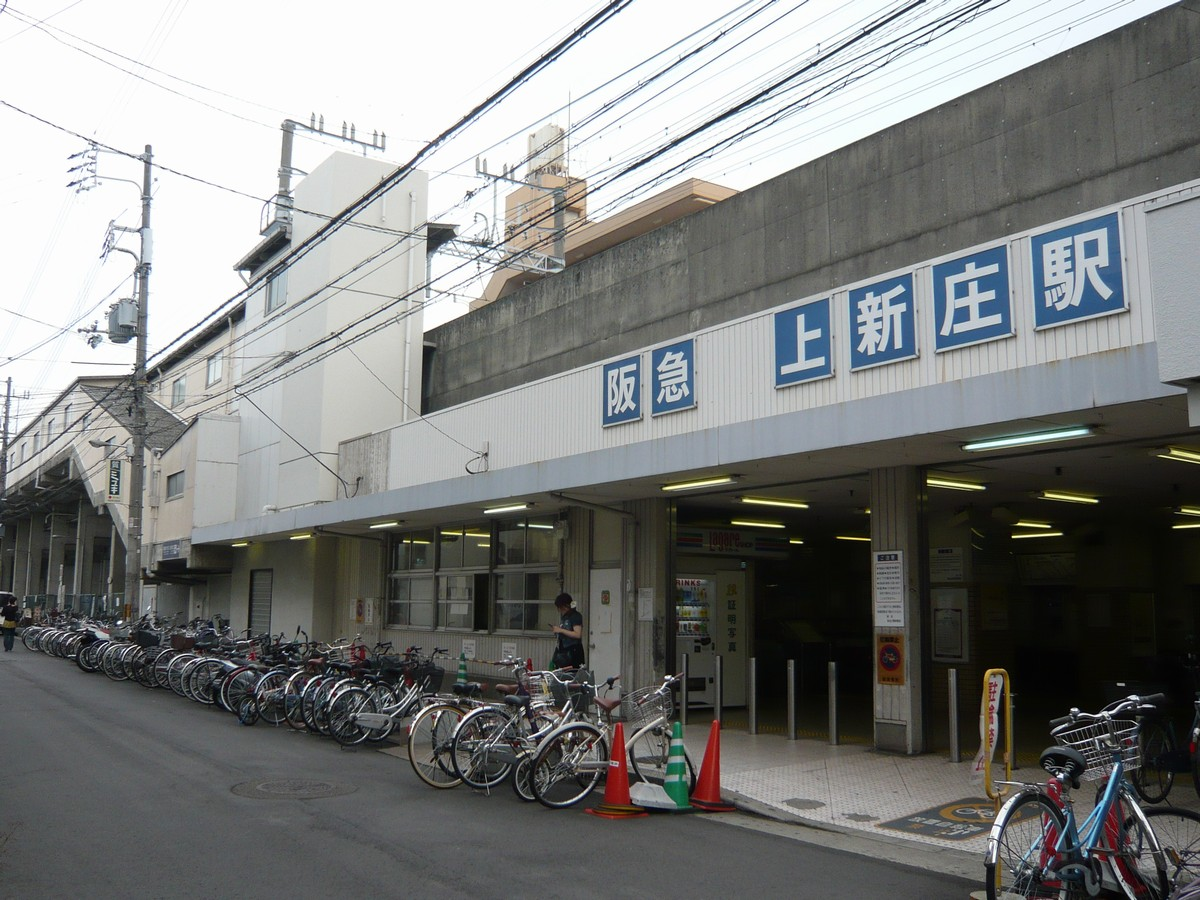
- North station entrance in 2007

General information
- Location: Japan
- Operator: Hankyu Railway
- Line: Kyoto Main Line
- Platforms: 2 - Side platforms
- Tracks: 2
- Connections

Construction
- Structure type: Elevated
- Accessible: yes

Other information
- Station code: HK-64

History
- Opened: 28 January 1916
Location

Kami-Shinjō Station (上新庄駅, Kami-Shinjō-eki; station number: HK-64) is a railway station on the Hankyu Kyoto Line located in Higashiyodogawa-ku, Osaka Prefecture, Japan. It is one of two nearest stations to Osaka University of Economics as well as Zuiko Yonchome Station on the Osaka Metro Imazatosuji Line.

== Layout ==
The station has two elevated side platforms serving a track each, over Japan National Route 479. Ticket gates are located in the north and the south. "Kami-Shinjo Hankyu Building" is close to the south gates. Opened as a ground-level station in 1916, it was elevated in 1975 shifting platforms in the direction of Kyoto, and removing the level crossing on Japan National Route 479 (then Osaka Municipal Road Shinjo Yamatogawa Route).

1	■ Kyoto Line	for Takatsuki-shi and Kyoto (Kawaramachi)
2	■ Kyoto Line	for Umeda, Tengachaya, Kita-Senri, Kobe, and Takarazuka

== Stations next to Kami-Shinjō ==
«	Service	»
Hankyu Kyoto Main Line (HK-64)
Awaji (HK-63)	Local	Aikawa (HK-65)
Awaji (HK-63)	Semi-Express	Minami-Ibaraki (HK-68)
Awaji (HK-63)	Express	Minami-Ibaraki (HK-68)
Semi Limited Express: Does not stop at this station
Limited Express: Does not stop at this station
Commutation Limited Express: Does not stop at this station
Rapid Limited Express "Kyo-Train Garaku", "Sagano", "Atago", "Togetsu", "Hozu": Does not stop at this station

== History ==
Kami-Shinjo station opened on 28 January 1916.

Station numbering was introduced to all Hankyu stations on 21 December 2013 with this station being designated as station number HK-64.

=== Future plans ===
Construction is underway for grade separation. Work is being done as of 2019 to elevate a 3.3 km (2.1 mi) section of the Kyoto Line south of this station towards Sōzenji Station. Originally planned to be opened by 2020, various delays have resulted in the opening being pushed to 2031.
