= Kunijima Station =

Railway station in Osaka, Japan

Coordinates: 34°43′41.62″N 135°30′41.16″E

Kunijima Station 柴島駅
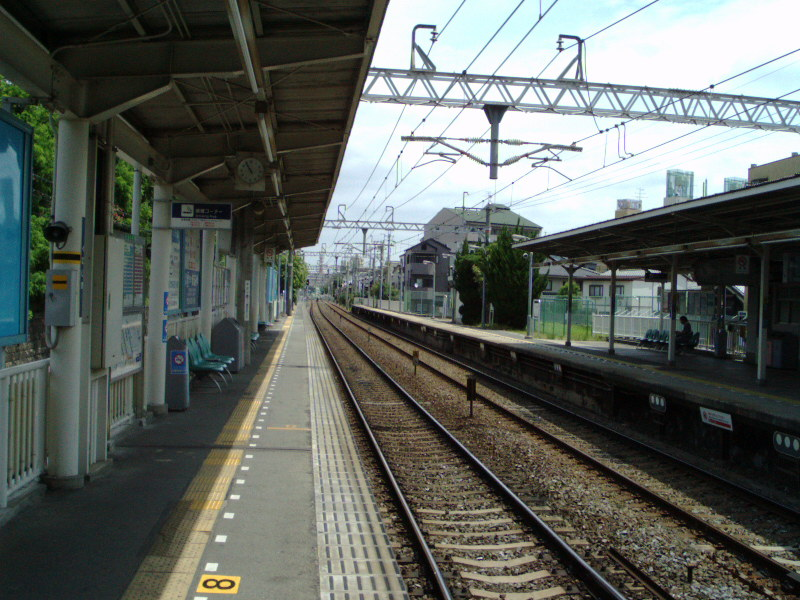
- Tracks and side platforms

General information
- Location: Higashiyodogawa, Osaka, Osaka; Japan
- Operator: Hankyu
- Line: Hankyu Senri Line

Other information
- Station code: HK87

History
- Opened: October 15, 1925

Services
Preceding station	Hankyu Railway	Following station
Tenjimbashisuji Rokuchōme Terminus	Senri Line	Awaji towards Kita-Senri
Location

Kunijima Station (柴島駅, Kunijima Eki; station number: HK-87) is a railway station on the Hankyu Senri Line in Higashiyodogawa-ku, Osaka, Japan.

== Layout ==
The station has two side platforms serving a track each connecting with a footbridge. Ticket gate is located on the side platform for Tengachaya.

■ Senri Line	southbound (for Tenjimbashisuji Rokuchome and Tengachaya)
■ Senri Line	northbound (for Kita-Senri and Takatsuki-shi)

== History ==
The station opened on October 15, 1925 when the line between Tenjinbashi (present-day Tenjimbashisuji Rokuchōme) and Awaji opened.

=== Future plans ===
Construction is underway for grade separation. Work is being done as of 2019 to elevate a 3.8 km (2.4 mi) section of the Senri Line between this station and Shimo-Shinjō Station. Originally planned to be opened by 2020, various delays have resulted in the opening being pushed to 2031.

== Surroundings ==
- Kunijima Purification Plant (Osaka City Waterworks Bureau)
- Kunijima Castle
- Kunijima Shrine
- Osaka Prefectural Kunijima High School
- Osaka Municipal Kunijima Junior High School
- Sozenji Station (Kyoto Line)
- Higashiyodogawa Kunijima Post Office
