= Rakusaiguchi Station =

Railway station in Kyoto, Japan

Coordinates: 34°57′50.71″N 135°42′11.13″E

Rakusaiguchi Station 洛西口駅
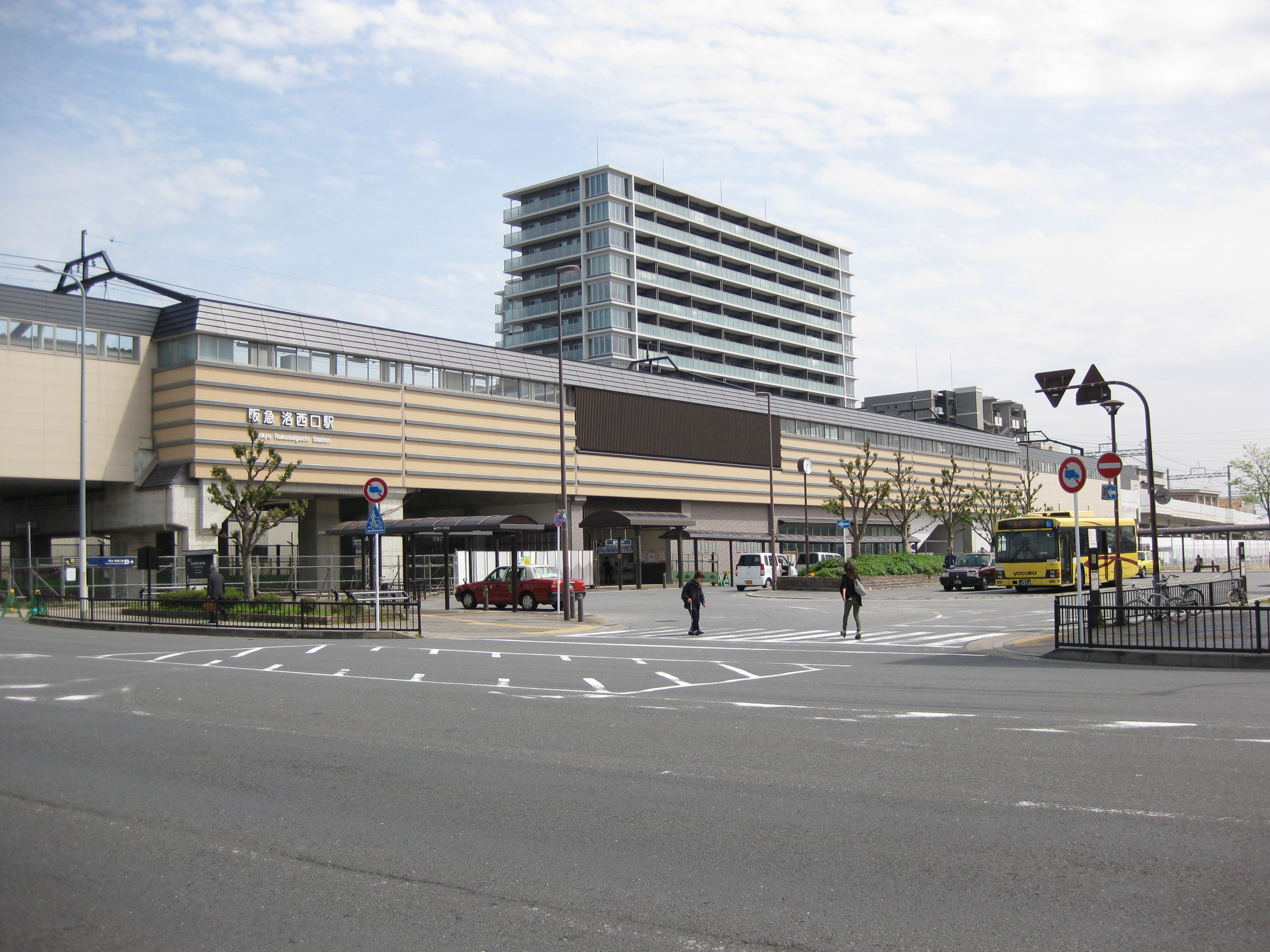
- West side of the station, April 2016

General information
- Location: Nishikyō, Kyoto, Kyoto Prefecture; Japan
- Operator: Hankyu Corporation
- Line: Hankyu Kyoto Main Line
- Tracks: 2
- Connections: Bus terminal

Other information
- Station code: HK-80

History
- Opened: 16 March 2003

Passengers
- FY2015: 4.5 million
Location
- Location within Kyoto city Location within Japan

Rakusaiguchi Station (洛西口駅, Rakusaiguchi-eki) is a train station on the Hankyu Kyoto Line in Japan. It was opened on 16 March 2003, and serves the communities nestled between Katsura and Mukō.

== Layout ==
The elevated station has two side platforms serving two tracks. Both platforms are connected by stairs, elevators and escalators with the ground level where a ticket gate is located.

== History ==
Rakusaiguchi Station opened on 16 March 2003.

Station numbering was introduced to all Hankyu stations on 21 December 2013 with this station being designated as station number HK-80.

Until the work to elevate the tracks was completed on 5 March 2016, each platform had its own ticket gate. From 26 October 2013 to 4 March 2016, only Kawaramachi-bound platform was on the elevated track.

== Usage ==
In fiscal 2015 (April 2015 to March 2016), about 4,525,000 passengers used this station annually. For historical data, see the table below.

Year	Number (in thousands)	
Year	Boarding	Total
2002	53	
2003	614	
2004	602	
2005	1,302	
2006	1,314	
2007	1,405	2,635
2008	1,503	2,855
2009	1,389	2,747
2010	1,419	2,749
2011	1,396	2,726
2012	1,438	2,798
2013	1,425	2,756
2015	2,276	4,525

== Stations next to Rakusaiguchi ==
«	Service	»
Hankyu Kyoto Line
Commutation Limited Express: Does not stop at this station
Limited Express: Does not stop at this station
Semi limited Express: Does not stop at this station
Express: Does not stop at this station
Higashi-Mukō	Semi-Express	Katsura
Higashi-Mukō	Local	Katsura
