= Katsura Station =

Railway station in Kyoto, Japan

Katsura Station 桂駅
- Exterior of Katsura Station (west side)

General information
- Location: Kawashima Kitauracho, Nishikyo-ku, Kyoto-fu, 615-8107; Japan
- Coordinates: 34°58′46″N 135°42′12″E
- System: Hankyu Railway commuter rail station
- Operator: Hankyu Railway.
- Lines: ■ Kyoto Main Line; ■ Arashiyama Line
- Distance: 38.0 km from Jūsō
- Platforms: 3 island platforms
- Tracks: 6
- Connections: Bus terminal

Other information
- Station code: HK81
- Website: www.hankyu.co.jp/global/en/station_guide/katsura/index.html

History
- Opened: November 1, 1928

Passengers
- FY2015: 20.6 million
Location
- Location within Kyoto Prefecture Location within Japan

Katsura Station (桂駅, Katsura-eki) is a passenger railway station located in Nishikyo-ku, Kyoto, and is about 15 kilometers from the center of Kyoto, near the Katsura River. It is operated by the private transportation company Hankyu Railway.

== Lines ==
The station is located on the Hankyu Kyoto Line and is 38.0 kilometers from the starting point of the line at Jūsō . It is also the eastern terminus of the 4.1 kilometer Hankyu Arashiyama Line.

== Layout ==
This station has three island platforms with six tracks, and an elevated station building. The Kyoto Main Line has two platforms with four tracks, while the Arashiyama Line has one platform with two tracks, allowing express trains to pass through. A dedicated underground passage connects the platforms. On the east side of the station is the 5-story shopping facility and station building "MEW Hankyu Katsura," which is directly connected by a pedestrian deck.

=== Platforms ===
C	■ Kyoto Line	for Kawaramachi and Karasuma (starting in the early morning)
C	■ Arashiyama Line	extra limited express trains for Arashiyama, Kawaramachi, Osaka (Umeda, Tengachaya), Kobe and Takarazuka
1	■ Arashiyama Line	for Arashiyama
2, 3	■ Kyoto Line	for Kawaramachi and Karasuma
4, 5	■ Kyoto Line	for Osaka (Umeda, Tengachaya), Kita-Senri, Kobe, and Takarazuka

== Adjacent stations ==
«	Service	»
Kyoto Line (HK-81)
Rakusaiguchi (HK-80)	Local	Nishi-Kyōgoku (HK-82)
Rakusaiguchi (HK-80)	Semi-Express	Nishi-Kyōgoku (HK-82)
Nagaoka-Tenjin (HK-77)	Express	Nishi-Kyōgoku (HK-82)
Nagaoka-Tenjin (HK-77)	Semi limited Express	Saiin (HK-83)
Nagaoka-Tenjin (HK-77)	Limited Express	Karasuma (HK-85)
Nagaoka-Tenjin (HK-77)	Commuter Limited Express	Saiin (HK-83)
Awaji (HK-63)	Rapid Limited Express "Kyo-Train Garaku" (weekends, holidays)	Karasuma (HK-85)
Arashiyama Line (HK-81)
Terminus	Local	Kami-Katsura (HK-96)
Awaji (HK-63)	Limited Express "Sagano", "Atago", "Togetsu", "Hozu"	Kami-Katsura (HK-96)
Karasuma (HK-85)	Limited Express "Ogura"	Kami-Katsura (HK-96)

== Usage ==
In fiscal 2015 (April 2015 to March 2016), about 20,595,000 passengers used this station annually. For historical data, see the table below.

Year	Number (in thousands)	
Year	Boarding	Total
2001	11,936	23,901
2002	11,640	23,431
2003	11,540	23,148
2004	11,289	22,775
2005	10,983	22,370
2006	10,919	21,817
2007	11,139	22,069
2008	11,241	22,321
2009	10,202	20,859
2010	9,962	20,072
2011	10,154	20,338
2012	10,234	20,351
2015	10,372	20,595

== History ==
Katsura Station opened on 1 November 1928.

Station numbering was introduced to all Hankyu stations on 21 December 2013 with this station being designated as station number HK-81.

== Surrounding area ==
Mister Donut, FamilyMart, 7-Eleven and Lawson are also located within walking distance. The station is also relatively near the Nishikyo Ward Office and Seiyu supermarket.
