= Tenjimbashisuji Rokuchōme Station =

Railway and metro station in Osaka, Japan

Tenjimbashisuji 6-chome Station 天神橋筋六丁目駅
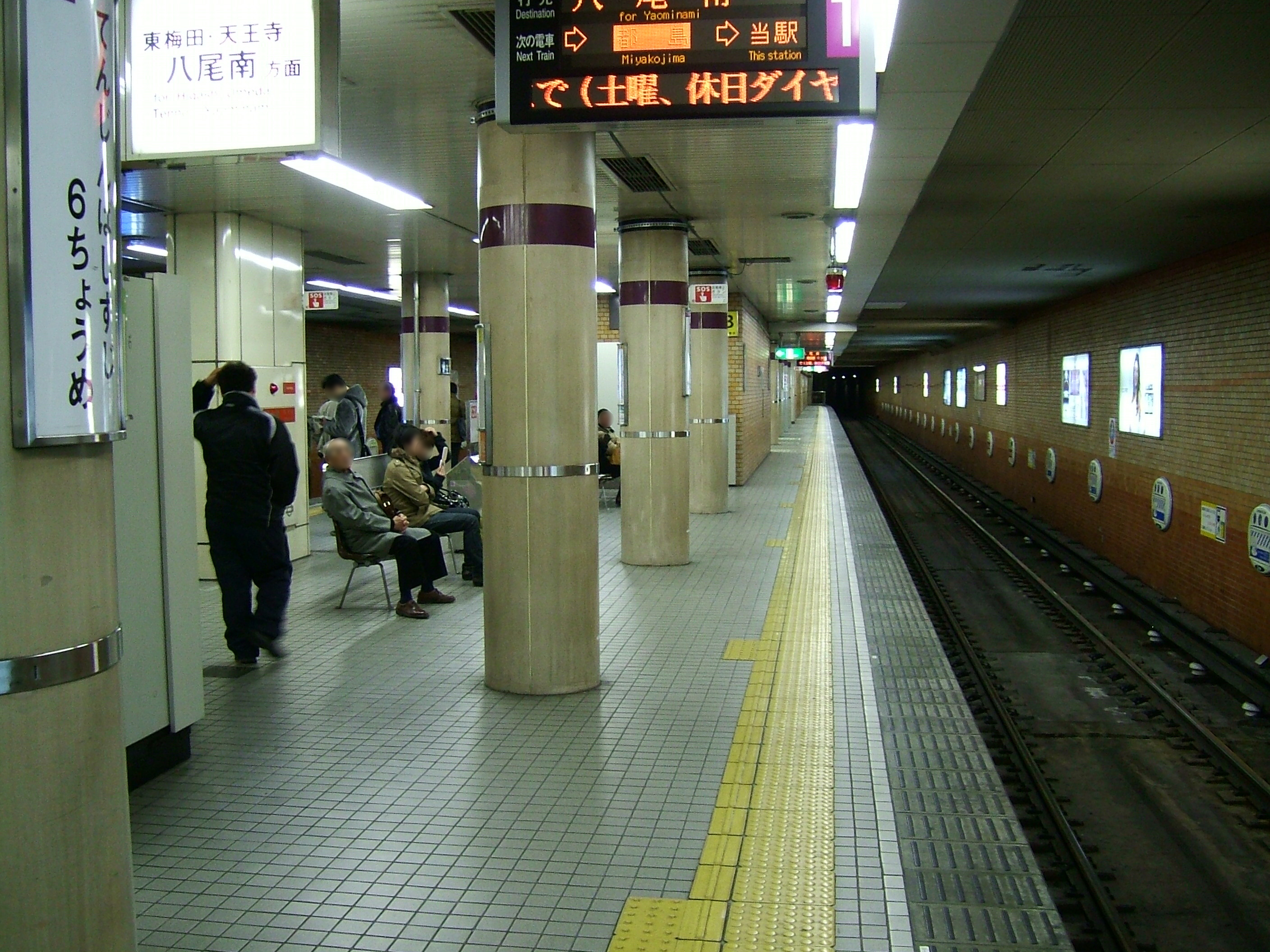
- Tanimachi Line platform, January 2008

General information
- Location: Tenjimbashi Rokuchome, Kita-ku, Osaka, Osaka （大阪市北区天神橋六丁目） Japan
- Coordinates: 34°42′38.17″N 135°30′38.82″E
- System: Osaka Metro
- Operator: Osaka Metro; Hankyu Corp.
- Lines: Tanimachi Line; Sakaisuji Line; Senri Line
- Platforms: 2 island platforms
- Tracks: 4

Construction
- Structure type: Underground

Other information
- Station code: K 11 T 18

History
- Opened: 15 October 1925; 100 years ago
- Rebuilt: 1969
- Former names: Tenjimbashi (until 1969)

Services
Preceding station	Osaka Metro	Following station
Miyakojima T 17 towards Dainichi	Tanimachi Line	Nakazakichō T 19 towards Yaominami
through to Hankyu Senri	Sakaisuji Line	Ōgimachi K 12 towards Tengachaya
through to Hankyu Kyoto	Sakaisuji Line	Ōgimachi K 12 towards Tengachaya
Location
- Location within Osaka Prefecture Location within Japan

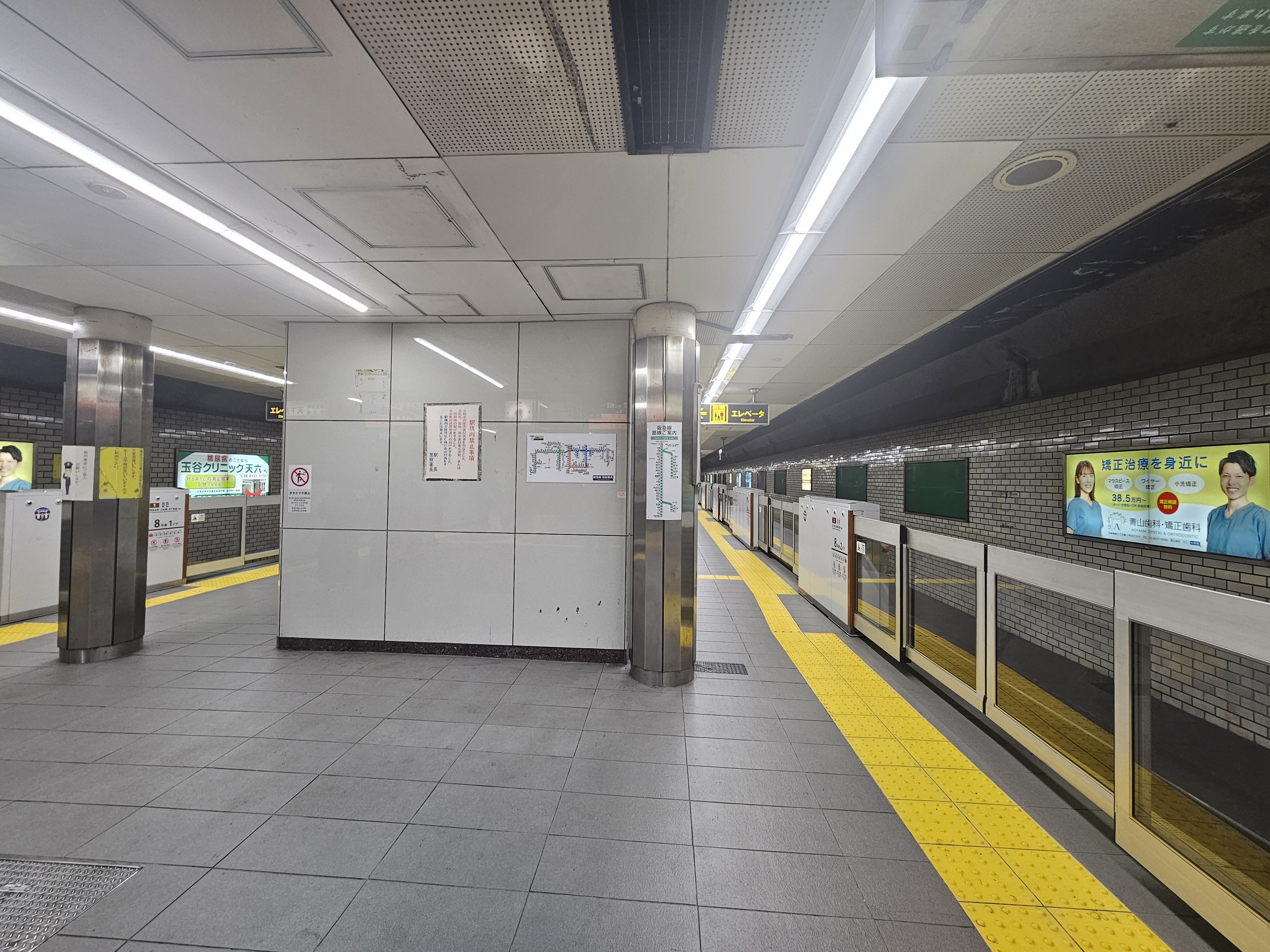
Sakaisuji Line/Hankyu Senri Line platform

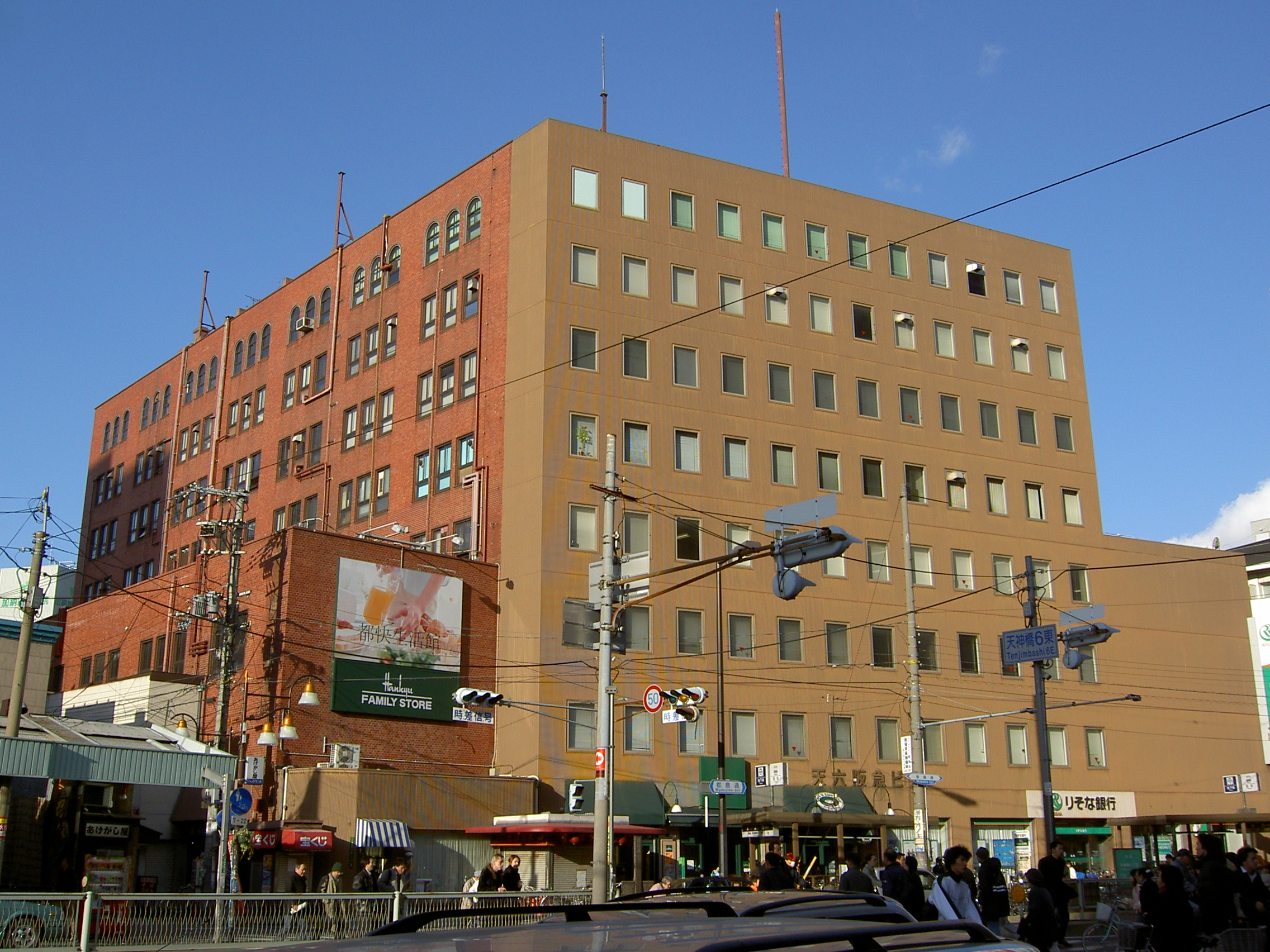
Tenroku Hankyū Building was the former Tenjinbashi terminal of Hankyu.

Tenjimbashisuji 6-chome Station (天神橋筋六丁目駅, Tenjimbashisuji Roku-chōme Eki) is located in Tenjimbashi Rokuchome, Kita-ku, Osaka, Japan. Nicknamed "Ten-roku", it is located on the Osaka Metro Tanimachi Line, the Sakaisuji Line and the Hankyu Railway Senri Line (also through trains to the Kyoto Line).

Until 1969 there was the terminal station of the Hankyū Senri Line named Tenjinbashi Station (天神橋駅) which opened in 1925. When the Sakaisuji Line subway opened, the station was replaced by the underground Tenjimbashisuji 6-chome Station. The station building (Ten-Roku Hankyu Building) and platforms remained until 2009, when the building was demolished to make way for high-rise condominiums.

The world's largest covered shopping street, known as the Tenjimbashisuji Shotengai, begins at Ten-roku. It is 2.6 km (1.6 mi) long.

== Layout ==
There is an island platform with two tracks for each line.

Tanimachi Line (T18)

1	■ Tanimachi Line	for Higahi-Umeda, Tennoji, and Yaominami
2	■ Tanimachi Line	for Miyakojima and Dainichi

Sakaisuji Line (K11) and Hankyu Railway Senri Line

1	■ Sakaisuji Line	for Sakaisuji-Hommachi, Nippombashi, Dobutsuen-mae, and Tengachaya
2	■ Hankyu Railway Senri Line	for Awaji, Kita-Senri, Takatsuki-shi, and Kyoto (Kawaramachi)

== 1970 gas explosion ==
On April 8, 1970, a gas explosion occurred during the construction of the Tanimachi Line at this station, killing 79 people and injuring 420. The gas leaked out from a detached joint and filled the tunnel and exploded, creating a fire pillar of over 10 meters and destroying 495 houses and buildings.

== Stations next to Tenjimbashisuji Rokuchome ==
«	Service	»
Osaka Metro Sakaisuji Line K11
Hankyu Railway Senri Line K11
Kunijima (Senri Line, HK-87)	Local	Ogimachi (Sakaisuji Line, K12 )
Awaji (Senri Line, HK-63)	Semi-Express	Ogimachi (Sakaisuji Line, K12 )
Awaji (Senri Line, HK-63)	Limited Express "Hozu"	Nippombashi (Sakaisuji Line, K17 )
