= Hankyu 3100 series =

Japanese train type

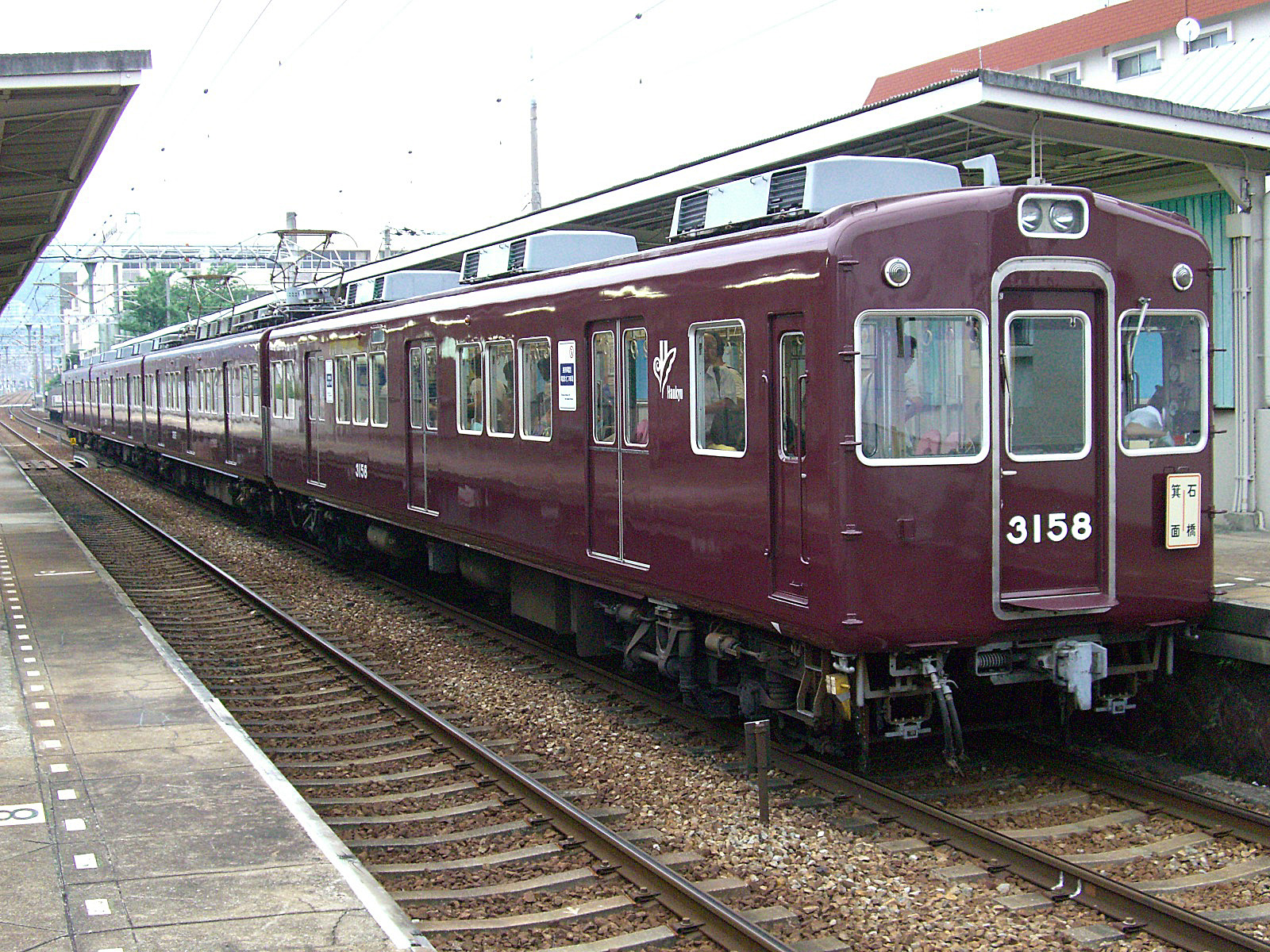
- 3100 series original style 4-car set 3158 in July 2007
- In service: 1964–2016
- Manufacturer: Alna Kōki
- Constructed: 1964–67
- Number built: 40 vehicles
- Number in service: none
- Formation: 3/4 cars per trainset
- Operators: Hankyu Corporation
- Lines served: Hankyu Takarazuka Main Line

Specifications
- Car body construction: Steel
- Car length: 19 m (62 ft 4 in)
- Doors: 3 pairs per side
- Maximum speed: 100 km/h (60 mph)
- Traction system: Resistor control
- Power output: 120 kW (160 hp) per motor
- Electric system(s): 600/1,500 V DC overhead catenary
- Current collection: Pantograph
- Braking system(s): Dynamic brake Electro-pneumatic brake
- Safety system(s): ATS
- Track gauge: 1,435 mm (4 ft 8 1/2 in)

The Hankyu 3100 series (阪急電鉄3100系) is an electric multiple unit (EMU) train type formerly operated in Japan by the private railway operator Hankyu Corporation from 1964 until 2016.

== Formations ==
Trains were formed as four-car and permanently coupled 3+3-car sets, as follows.

=== 4-car sets ===
Car No.	1	2	3	4
Designation	Tc	M	T	M'c
Numbering	3150	3600	3650	3101

Car 2 was fitted with two pantographs, and car 3 was designated as a mildly air-conditioned car.

=== 3+3-car sets ===
Car No.	1	2	3	4	5	6
Designation	Tc	M	M'c	Tc	M	M'c
Numbering	3150	3600	3100	3150	3600	3100

Cars 2 and 5 were each fitted with two pantographs, and car 5 was designated as a mildly air-conditioned car.

One 3100 series car, 3651, is inserted in 3000 series four-car set 3007.

== History ==
40 3100 series cars were built between 1964 and 1967 for use on the Hankyu Takarazuka Line. Initially not air-conditioned, the fleet was retro-fitted with air-conditioning between 1975 and 1981.

The last remaining set, four-car set 3150, was withdrawn following its final run on 8 July 2016.
