= Hankyu 2000 series (1960) =

Japanese train type

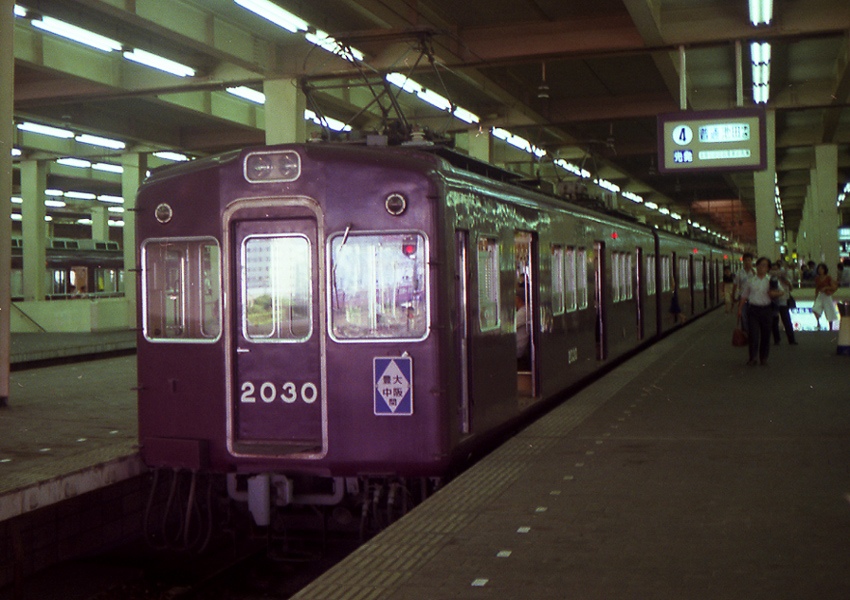
- A 2000 series at Umeda Station
- In service: 1960–2013
- Manufacturer: Naniwa Kōki
- Family name: Auto Car
- Number built: 114 vehicles
- Number in service: 9 vehicles (mixed 3000 series)
- Number preserved: 2 vehicles
- Operators: Hankyu Railway

Specifications
- Car body construction: Steel
- Doors: 3 pairs per side
- Maximum speed: 110 km/h (70 mph)
- Traction system: Resistor control
- Electric system(s): 600 V DC, later 1,500 V DC overhead catenary
- Current collector(s): Pantograph
- Braking system(s): Regenerative brake (originally); Dynamic brake Electro-pneumatic brake
- Safety system(s): ATS
- Coupling system: Knuckle-Type
- Track gauge: 1,435 mm (4 ft 8 1/2 in)

The Hankyu 2000 series (阪急電鉄2000系) was an electric multiple unit (EMU) train type operated in Japan by the private railway operator Hankyu Railway since 1960. It was the recipient of the inaugural Laurel Prize presented by the Japan Railfan Club in 1961.

== Variants ==
The 2000 series included the following types.

- 2021 series (later reclassified 2071 series)
- 2100 series

== Interior ==
Passenger accommodation consisted of longitudinal bench seating throughout.

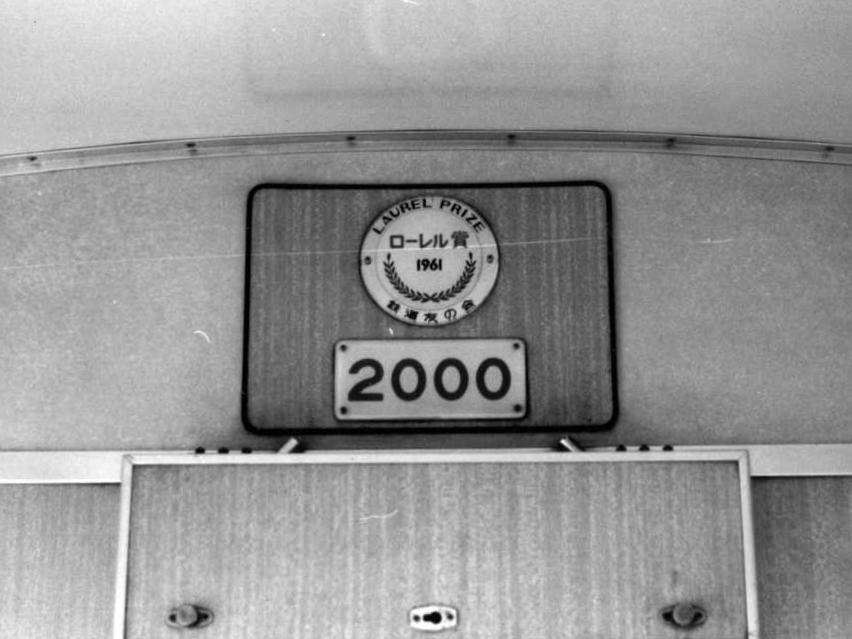
Laurel Prize Award plaque

== Withdrawal and resale ==
The 2100 series trains were withdrawn between 1983 and 1985, and four-car sets were sold to the Nose Electric Railway, classified as 1500 series. The 2000 series trains were withdrawn between 1989 and 1992, and four-car sets were sold to the Nose Electric Railway, classified as 1700 series.

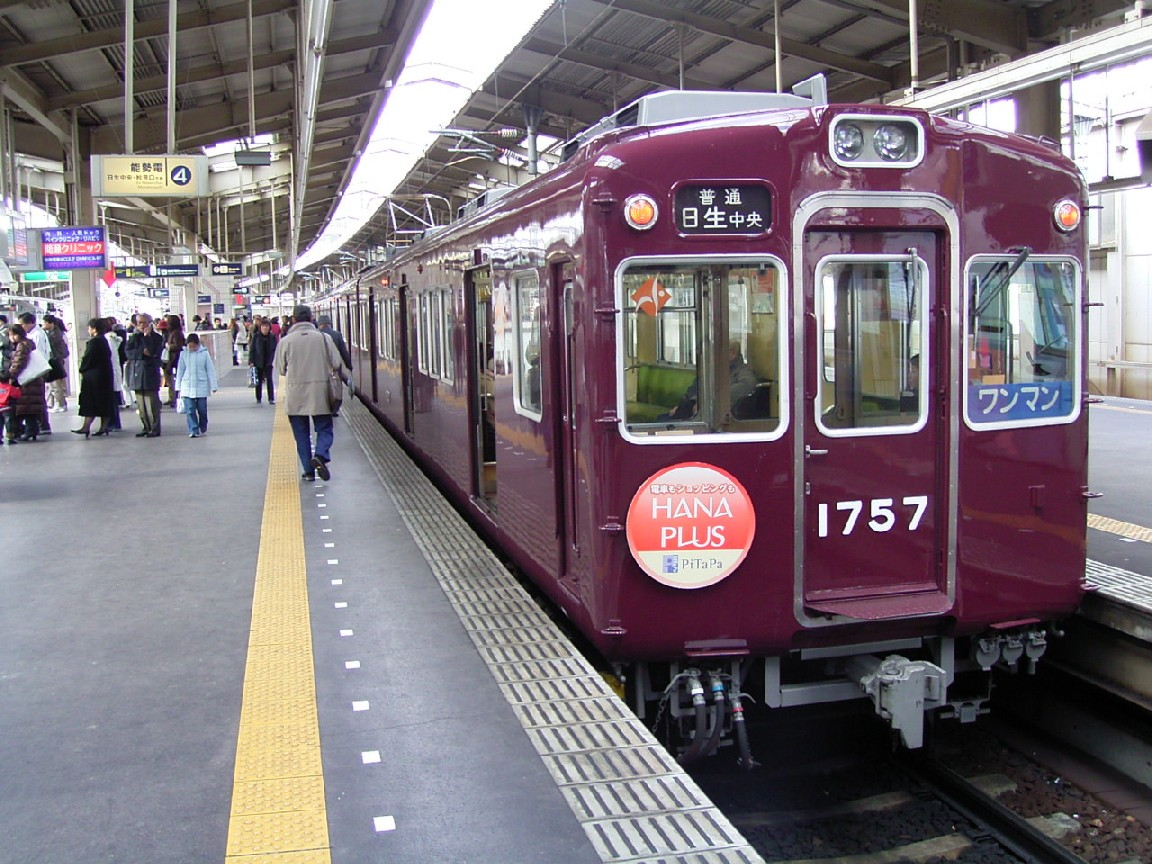
Nose Electric Railway 1700 series set 1757 in 2006
