= Hankyu Kyoto Main Line =

Japanese railway line

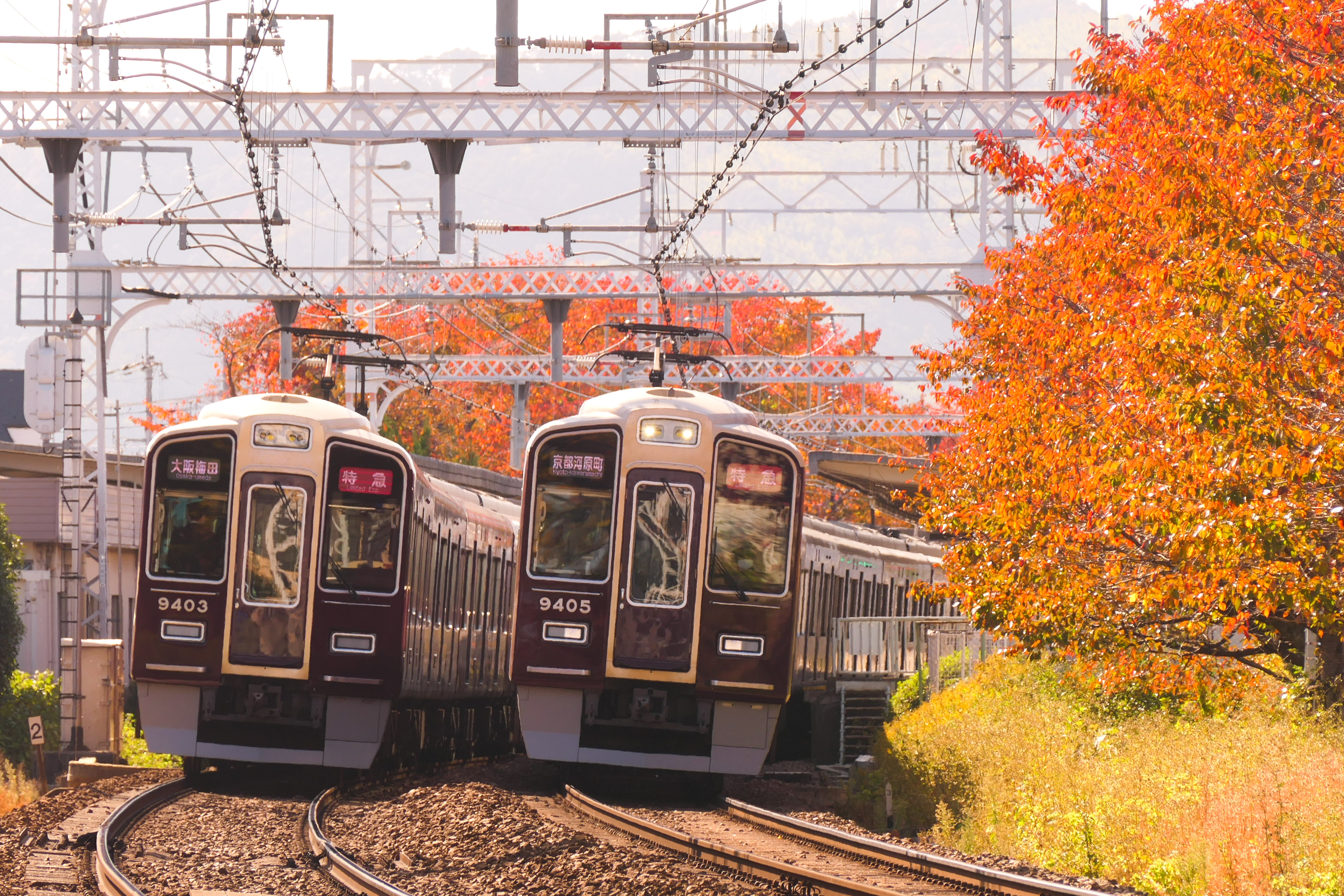
- A pair of 9300 series EMUs near Nishi-Muko Station

Overview
- Native name: 阪急京都本線
- Locale: Kansai
- Termini: Jūsō; Kyoto-kawaramachi
- Stations: 26

Service
- Operator: Hankyu Railway
- Depot(s): Shōjaku; Katsura
- Rolling stock: Hankyu Kyoto Main Line#Rolling stock

History
- Opened: 1 April 1921; 105 years ago

Technical
- Line length: 45.3 km (28.1 mi)
- Number of tracks: Double
- Track gauge: 1,435 mm (4 ft 8 1/2 in)
- Electrification: 1,500 V DC, overhead line
- Operating speed: 115 km/h (70 mph)
Route map

The Hankyu Kyoto Main Line (阪急京都本線, Hankyū Kyōto-honsen) is a railway line in Japan operated by the private railway operator Hankyu Railway. It connects Umeda Station in Osaka and Kyoto-kawaramachi Station in Kyoto.

== Definition ==
The Kyoto Main Line is often called the Kyoto Line (京都線, Kyōto-sen) for short, and in a broader sense its two branch lines, the Senri Line and the Arashiyama Line, are included to the Kyoto Line by historical, geographical and structural reasons. The other two sections of Hankyu, the Kobe Line and the Takarazuka Line are called the Shinpōsen (神宝線) as a whole.

Officially, the Kyoto Main Line is from Jūsō to Kyoto-kawaramachi, however, all trains run beyond Jūsō to Osaka-umeda terminal, using the eastern tracks of the section exclusively. Hankyu treats the Kyoto Main Line in the same way as the passengers do, i.e. as the line between Osaka-umeda and Kyoto-kawaramachi (except for special circumstances such as governmental procedures).

== History ==
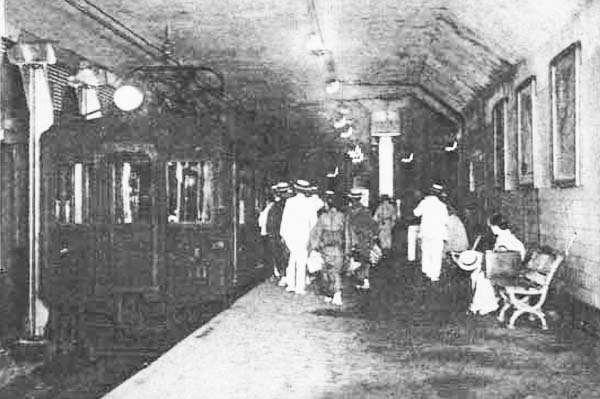
An underground station in 1931

The Kyoto Main Line was constructed in the following phases:

- 1 April, 1921: Jūsō – Awaji (by Kita-Osaka Electric Railway)
- 16 January 1928: Awaji – Takatsuki-machi (present-day Takatsuki-shi) (by Shin-Keihan Railway)
- 1 November 1928: Takatsuki-machi – Kyoto-Saiin (present-day Saiin) (by Shin-Keihan Railway)
- 31 March 1931: Saiin – Keihan-Kyoto (present-day Ōmiya) (by Keihan Electric Railway)
- 18 February 1959: The additional double tracks of the Takarazuka Main Line between Umeda (present-day Osaka-umeda) and Jūso now used exclusively by the Kyoto Main Line
- 17 June 1963: Ōmiya – Kawaramachi (now Kyoto-kawaramachi)

During the wartime consolidation policies of World War II, Hankyu Railway and Keihan Railway were temporarily forced to merge. After the war, the merger was dissolved in 1949. Keihan demanded the return of this line, while Hankyu maintained that it was part of its own network. In the end, it was not returned to Keihan, and Hankyu effectively wrested the line from Keihan against its wishes.

Construction has been in progress since 2012 to elevate a 3.3 km (2.1 mi) section of track from Sōzenji Station to Kami-Shinjō Station including the junction with the Senri Line at Awaji Station. Originally projected for a 2020 completion, various delays have pushed back the start of operations on the new tracks to 2031.

Station numbering was introduced to all Hankyu stations on 21 December 2013.

=== Proposed connecting line ===
A loop line from Juso to Awaji via Shin-Osaka Station, to provide a direct connection to the Shinkansen has been proposed, but is not currently scheduled for construction.

== Service types ==
=== Regular operations ===
As of the December 2022 timetable, trains are classified as follows:

Local (普通, futsū)

- Local trains stop at all stations on the Kyoto and Senri lines. During the day they operate between Osaka Umeda or Tengachaya and Takatsuki-shi or Kita Senri. During early mornings, rush hours, and late nights, some services are extended to Kyoto-Kawaramachi and other short turn services are operated as well.

Semi-Express (準急, junkyū)

- All day except early morning and late nights between Osaka-Umeda and Kyoto-Kawaramachi. Additional services operate through to Tengachaya during weekday rush hours and weekends. Limited stops between Osaka-Umeda and Takatsuki-shi, then all stops to Kyoto-Kawaramachi.

Express (急行, kyūkou)

- Late nights from Osaka-Umeda to Kyoto-Kawaramachi and weekday early mornings towards Osaka-Umeda.

Semi-Limited Express (準特急, juntokkyū)

- Early mornings and evenings and weekday rush hours, both directions.

Commuter Limited Express (通勤特急, tsūkin tokkyū)

- Weekday morning rush hours only, both directions. Car number 5 is for women only.

Limited Express (特急, tokkyū)

- Operates during the daytime when other express and limited express services are not running.

Rapid Limited Express (快速特急, kaisoku tokkyū)

- Weekends only, using special 6 car trains.

=== Extra services ===
- Rapid Limited Express (快速特急, kaisoku tokkyū)
  - Osaka-umeda - Arashiyama: "Sagano (さがの; named after the district in Ukyo-ku, Kyoto)"
  - Kyoto-kawaramachi - Arashiyama: "Ogura (おぐら; named after Mount Ogura)"
- Direct Limited Express (直通特急, chokutsū tokkyū) - Through services to Arashiyama Line, Osaka Metro Sakaisuji Line, Takarazuka Main Line and the Kobe Main Line.
  - Kosoku Kobe - Arashiyama: "Atago (あたご; named after Mount Atago)"
  - Takarazuka - Arashiyama (via the Imazu Line): "Togetsu (とげつ; named after Togetsukyo Bridge)"
  - Tengachaya - Arashiyama: "Hozu (ほづ; named after the Hozu River)" (seasonal service)
- On the Kyoto Main Line, these extra limited express stop at the same stations as the regular Rapid Limited Express.

== Stations ==
Legends:

- ● : Trains stop.
- | : Trains pass.

Local trains stop at all stations.

No trains stop at Nakatsu which is served by Local trains on the Kobe Main Line and the Takarazuka Main Line, because of the absence of any platforms on this line. Thus, in operation, Nakatsu Station is not listed on the Kyoto Line.

The starting point of the distances (km) shown is Jūsō Station, which is officially the starting point of the Kyoto Main Line.

| Line name | No. | Station | | Distance (km) | Semi-Express | Express | Semi Ltd. Exp. | Commuter Ltd. Exp. | Ltd. Exp. | Rapid Ltd. Exp. | Transfers | Location | |
|---|---|---|---|---|---|---|---|---|---|---|---|---|---|
| Through services: | | | | | From Awaji: Local / Semi-Express ー From Kyoto-Kawaramachi to Tengachaya via the Senri Line and Osaka Metro Sakaisuji Line Local — From Osaka-Umeda to Kita-Senri via the Senri Line | | | | | | | | |
| Takarazuka Main Line | HK-01 | Osaka-umeda | 大阪梅田 | (2.4) | ● | ● | ● | ● | ● | ● | Hanshin Electric Railway Main Line (HS 01) Osaka Metro: Midosuji Line (M16); Tanimachi Line (T20: Higashi-Umeda Station); Yotsubashi Line (Y11: Nishi-Umeda Station); JR West (Ōsaka Station): Tōkaidō Main Line; JR Kyoto Line (JR-A47); JR Kobe Line (JR-A47); JR Takarazuka Line (JR-G47); Osaka Higashi Line (JR-F01); Osaka Loop Line (JR-O11); JR Tōzai Line (JR-H44: Kitashinchi Station) | Kita-ku, Osaka | Osaka Prefecture |
| Takarazuka Main Line | HK-03 | Jūsō | 十三 | 0.0 | ● | ● | ● | ● | ● | ● | Hankyu Kobe Main Line Hankyu Takarazuka Main Line | Yodogawa-ku, Osaka | Osaka Prefecture |
| Kyoto Main Line | HK-03 | Jūsō | 十三 | 0.0 | ● | ● | ● | ● | ● | ● | Hankyu Kobe Main Line Hankyu Takarazuka Main Line | Yodogawa-ku, Osaka | Osaka Prefecture |
| Kyoto Main Line | HK-61 | Minamikata | 南方 | 1.9 | ● | ● | | | | | | | | | Osaka Metro Midosuji Line (M14: Nishinakajima-Minamigata Station) | Yodogawa-ku, Osaka | Osaka Prefecture |
| Kyoto Main Line | HK-62 | Sōzenji | 崇禅寺 | 3.2 | | | | | | | | | | | | | | Higashiyodogawa-ku, Osaka | Osaka Prefecture |
| Kyoto Main Line | HK-63 | Awaji | 淡路 | 4.2 | ● | ● | ● | | | ● | ● | Hankyū Senri Line (through service, see above) JR West Osaka Higashi Line (JR-F04:JR-Awaji Station) | Higashiyodogawa-ku, Osaka | Osaka Prefecture |
| Kyoto Main Line | HK-64 | Kami-Shinjō | 上新庄 | 6.3 | ● | ● | | | | | | | | | | Higashiyodogawa-ku, Osaka | Osaka Prefecture |
| Kyoto Main Line | HK-65 | Aikawa | 相川 | 7.2 | | | | | | | | | | | | | | Higashiyodogawa-ku, Osaka | Osaka Prefecture |
| Kyoto Main Line | HK-66 | Shōjaku | 正雀 | 9.4 | | | | | | | | | | | | | | Settsu | Osaka Prefecture |
| Kyoto Main Line | HK-67 | Settsu-shi | 摂津市 | 10.9 | | | | | | | | | | | | | | Settsu | Osaka Prefecture |
| Kyoto Main Line | HK-68 | Minami-Ibaraki | 南茨木 | 12.9 | ● | ● | | | | | | | | | ■ Osaka Monorail Main Line (19) | Ibaraki | Osaka Prefecture |
| Kyoto Main Line | HK-69 | Ibaraki-shi | 茨木市 | 14.8 | ● | ● | ● | ● | ● | | | | Ibaraki | Osaka Prefecture |
| Kyoto Main Line | HK-70 | Sōjiji | 総持寺 | 16.8 | | | | | | | | | | | | | | Ibaraki | Osaka Prefecture |
| Kyoto Main Line | HK-71 | Tonda | 富田 | 17.3 | | | | | | | | | | | | | | Takatsuki | Osaka Prefecture |
| Kyoto Main Line | HK-72 | Takatsuki-shi | 高槻市 | 20.6 | ● | ● | ● | ● | ● | | | | Takatsuki | Osaka Prefecture |
| Kyoto Main Line | HK-73 | Kammaki | 上牧 | 24.9 | ● | | | | | | | | | | | | Takatsuki | Osaka Prefecture |
| Kyoto Main Line | HK-74 | Minase | 水無瀬 | 25.7 | ● | | | | | | | | | | | | Shimamoto | Osaka Prefecture |
| Kyoto Main Line | HK-75 | Ōyamazaki | 大山崎 | 27.7 | ● | | | | | | | | | | | | Ōyamazaki | Kyoto Prefecture |
| Kyoto Main Line | HK-76 | Nishiyama Tennozan | 西山天王山 | 30.2 | ● | | | | | | | | | | | | Nagaokakyō | Kyoto Prefecture |
| Kyoto Main Line | HK-77 | Nagaoka-Tenjin | 長岡天神 | 31.7 | ● | ● | ● | ● | ● | | | | Nagaokakyō | Kyoto Prefecture |
| Kyoto Main Line | HK-78 | Nishi-Mukō | 西向日 | 33.6 | ● | | | | | | | | | | | | Mukō | Kyoto Prefecture |
| Kyoto Main Line | HK-79 | Higashi-Mukō | 東向日 | 35.0 | ● | | | | | | | | | | | | Mukō | Kyoto Prefecture |
| Kyoto Main Line | HK-80 | Rakusaiguchi | 洛西口 | 36.3 | ● | | | | | | | | | | | | Nishikyō-ku, Kyoto | Kyoto Prefecture |
| Kyoto Main Line | HK-81 | Katsura | 桂 | 38.0 | ● | ● | ● | ● | ● | ● | Hankyu Arashiyama Line | Nishikyō-ku, Kyoto | Kyoto Prefecture |
| Kyoto Main Line | HK-82 | Nishi-Kyōgoku | 西京極 (西京極総合運動公園前) | 40.1 | ● | ● | | | | | | | | | | Ukyō-ku, Kyoto | Kyoto Prefecture |
| Kyoto Main Line | HK-83 | Saiin | 西院 | 41.9 | ● | ● | ● | ● | | | | | Keifuku Electric Railroad Arashiyama Main Line (A02) | Ukyō-ku, Kyoto | Kyoto Prefecture |
| Kyoto Main Line | HK-84 | Ōmiya | 大宮 | 43.3 | ● | ● | ● | ● | | | | | Keifuku Electric Railroad Arashiyama Main Line (A01: Shijō-Ōmiya Station) | Nakagyō-ku, Kyoto | Kyoto Prefecture |
| Kyoto Main Line | HK-85 | Karasuma | 烏丸 | 44.4 | ● | ● | ● | ● | ● | ● | Kyoto Municipal Subway Karasuma Line (K09: Shijō Station) | Shimogyō-ku, Kyoto | Kyoto Prefecture |
| Kyoto Main Line | HK-86 | Kyoto-kawaramachi | 京都河原町 | 45.3 | ● | ● | ● | ● | ● | ● | Keihan Main Line (KH39: Gion-Shijō Station) | Shimogyō-ku, Kyoto | Kyoto Prefecture |

== Rolling stock ==
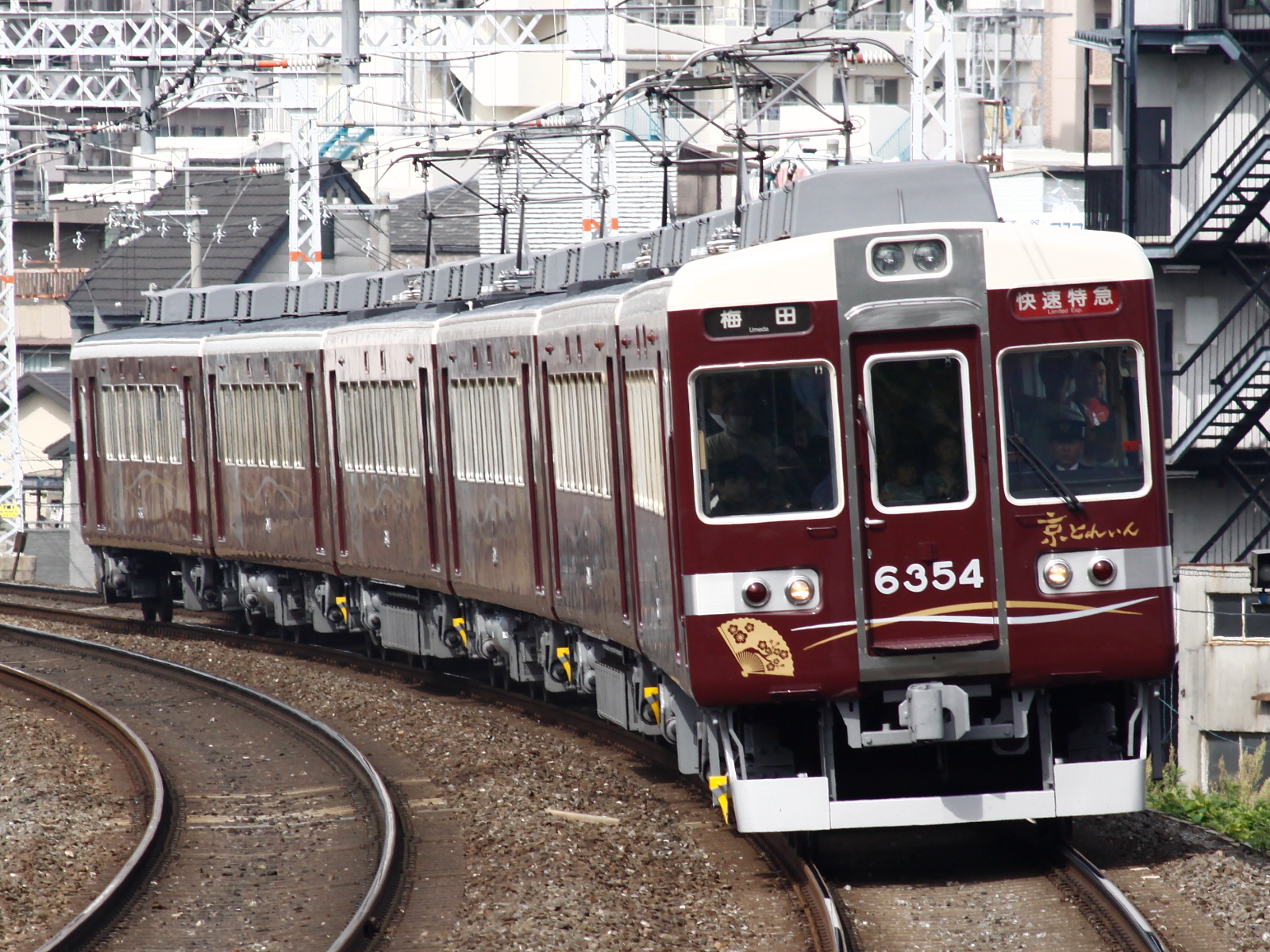
Hankyu 6300 series EMU on a rapid limited express service

- 1300 series (II) EMU (from 30 March 2014)
- 2300 series (II) EMU (from 21 July 2024)
- 3300 series EMU
- 5300 series EMU
- 7000 series EMU (Kyō-Train Garaku)
- 7300 series EMU
- 8300 series EMU
- 9300 series EMU
- Osaka Municipal Subway 66 series EMU (Awaji - Takatsuki-shi)

=== Former ===
- 1300 series (I) EMU
- 2000 series (I) EMU (Temporary)
- 2300 series (I) EMU
- 2800 series EMU
- 5100 series EMU (Temporary)
- 6300 series EMU (Kyō-Train)
- Osaka Municipal Subway 60 series EMU (Awaji - Takatsuki-shi)
