= Arashiyama Station (Hankyu) =

Railway station in Kyoto, Japan

Arashiyama Station 嵐山駅
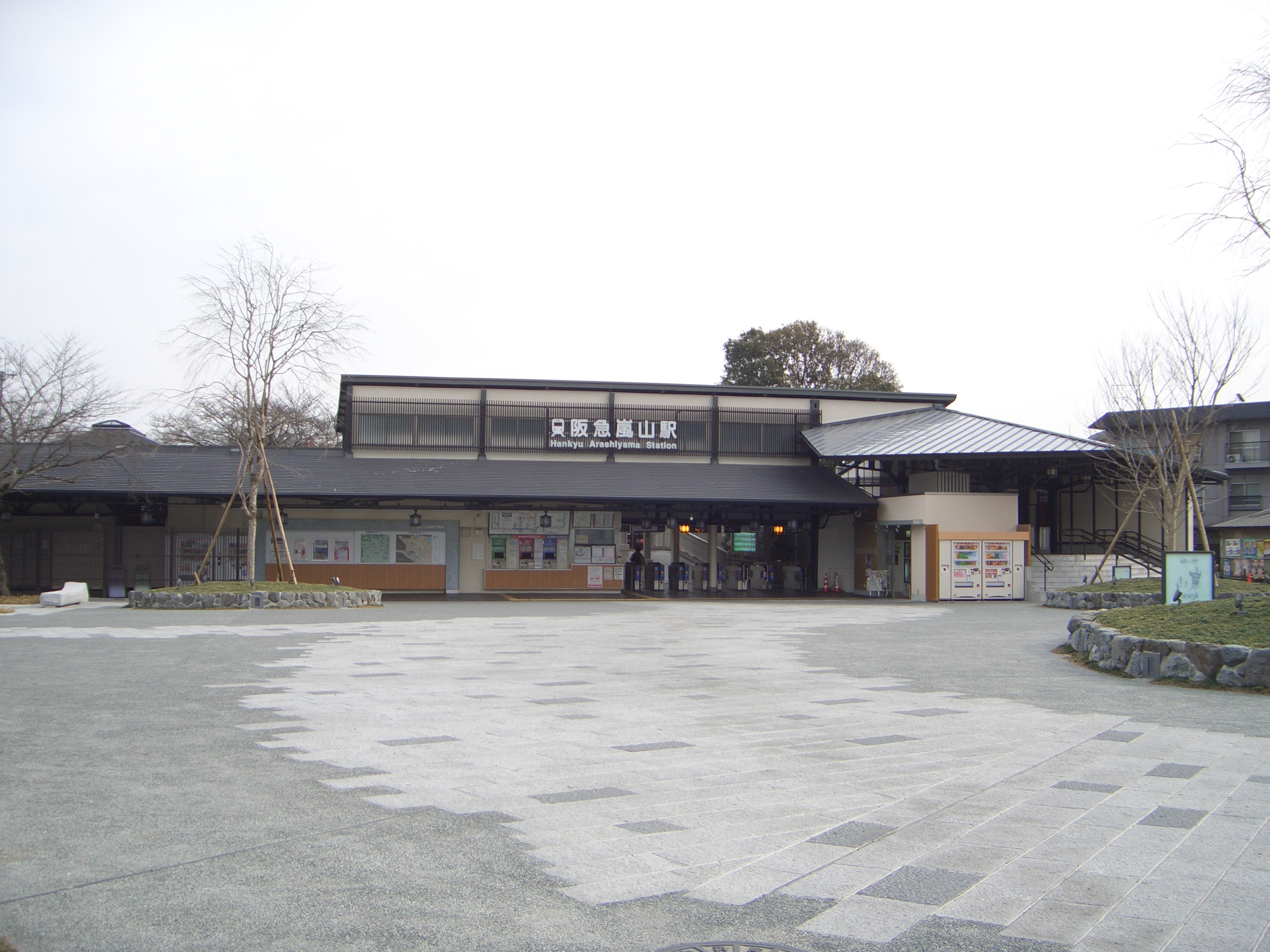

General information
- Other names: Sagano
- Location: Nishikyō-ku, Kyoto; Japan
- Coordinates: 35°0′37″N 135°40′54″E
- Operator: Hankyu Corporation
- Line: Arashiyama Line
- Platforms: 3
- Tracks: 2
- Connections: Arashiyama Station (Randen)

Other information
- Station code: HK-98
- Website: Official

History
- Opened: 1928

Passengers
- FY2015: 3.3 million
Location
- Location within Kyoto city Location within Japan

Arashiyama Station (嵐山駅, Arashiyama-eki) is a railway station in Kyoto, Japan. It is the terminal station of the Hankyu Arashiyama Line. The station is a short walk from Nakanoshima Park and Togetsukyo Bridge. In spring, sakura trees lining the station light up in an array of white and pink.

== History ==
The station was opened by Shin-Keihan Railway as the terminus of the branchline on November 9, 1928. It originally had six platforms serving five dead-end tracks, which were later reduced to three platforms for two tracks.
