= Kyoto-kawaramachi Station =

Railway station in Kyoto, Japan

Kyoto-kawaramachi 京都河原町
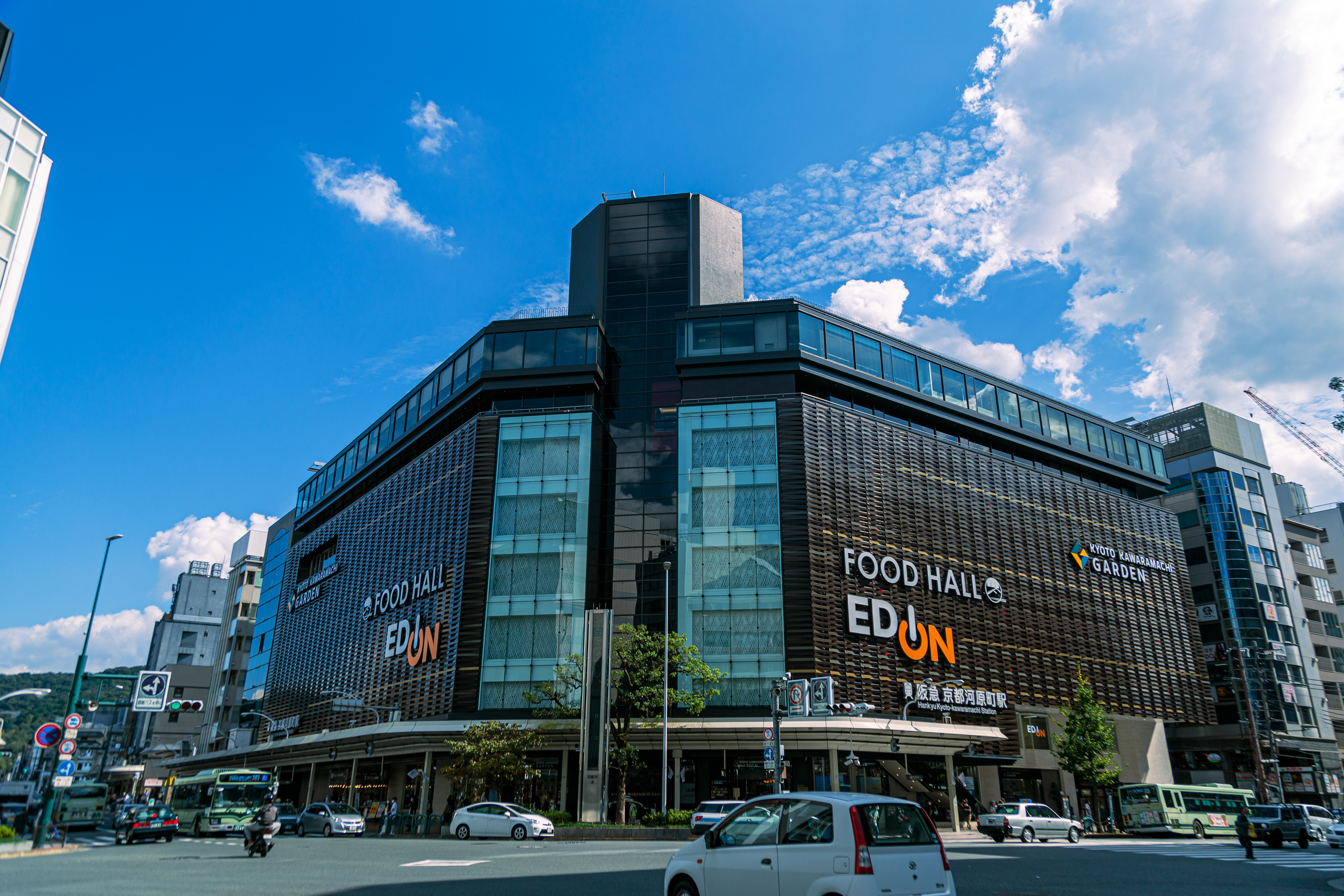
- Former Hankyu Department Store building above the underground terminal, now occupied by Kyoto Marui

General information
- Location: Shijō-dōri Kawaramachi, Shimogyō, Kyoto, Kyoto （京都市下京区四条通河原町） Japan
- Coordinates: 35°0′13.5″N 135°46′9.5″E
- Operator: Hankyu Corporation
- Line: Kyoto Main Line
- Tracks: 3
- Connections: Gion-Shijō Station (Keihan Main Line)

Other information
- Station code: HK-86
- Website: Official

History
- Opened: June 17, 1963

Passengers
- 2025: 71,257 daily
Location

Kyoto-kawaramachi Station (京都河原町駅, Kyōto-kawaramachi eki) is the northern terminal station of the Hankyu Kyoto Main Line of Hankyu in Kyoto City, Japan.

== Layout ==
The station has an island platform serving three tracks underground.

1	■ Kyoto Line	for Katsura, Takatsuki-shi, Osaka (Umeda), Arashiyama, Kita-Senri, Tengachaya, Kobe, and Takarazuka
2	■ Kyoto Line	for Katsura, Takatsuki-shi, and Osaka (Umeda) (One local train departs for Osaka (Umeda) every morning, and one local train for Nagaoka-Tenjin on weekdays) sightseeing limited express trains for Osaka (Umeda)
3	■ Kyoto Line	for Katsura, Takatsuki-shi, Osaka (Umeda), Arashiyama, Kita-Senri, Tengachaya, Kobe, and Takarazuka

== Adjacent stations ==
«	Service	»
Hankyu Kyoto Main Line
Karasuma	Local	Terminus
Karasuma	Semi-Express	Terminus
Karasuma	Rapid Service	Terminus
Karasuma	Semi Limited Express	Terminus
Karasuma	Limited Express	Terminus
Karasuma	Commuter Limited Express	Terminus
Karasuma	Rapid Limited Express "Kyo-Train", "Ogura"	Terminus
Karasuma	Rapid Limited Express A "Kyo-Train"	Terminus

== History ==
This station opened as Kawaramachi Station on June 17, 1963; it was renamed to Kyoto-kawaramachi Station on October 1, 2019.

Before the opening of Kawaramachi Station and Karasuma Station, the Hankyu Kyoto Main Line terminated at Ōmiya Station.

Station numbering was introduced to all Hankyu stations on 21 December 2013 with this station being designated as station number HK-86.

== Passenger statistics ==
In fiscal 2015 (April 2015 to March 2016), approximately 27,320,000 passengers used this station annually. For historical data, see the table below.

Year	Number	
Year	Boarding	Total
2001	14,773,000	28,665,000
2002	14,027,000	27,717,000
2003	13,930,000	26,861,000
2004	13,641,000	26,433,000
2005	14,116,000	26,863,000
2006	13,830,000	26,586,000
2007	14,471,000	27,479,000
2008	15,816,000	29,763,000
2009	13,121,000	26,406,000
2010	12,925,000	24,882,000
2011	12,819,000	24,508,000
2012	13,454,000	25,522,000
2015	14,460,000	27,320,000

== Surrounding area ==
The area around the station (Shijō Kawaramachi) is one of the commercial centers of Kyoto. The real estate around the station is the most valuable in Kyoto. The Kawaramachi and Shijo streets cross over the underground station. Gion-Shijo Station on the Keihan Main Line is located beyond the Kamo River.

The station is attached underground to department stores such as Takashimaya, which has a food market on its basement floor. The station also connects underground to Karasuma Station.
