= Hankyu =

Japanese railway company

Hankyu Railway

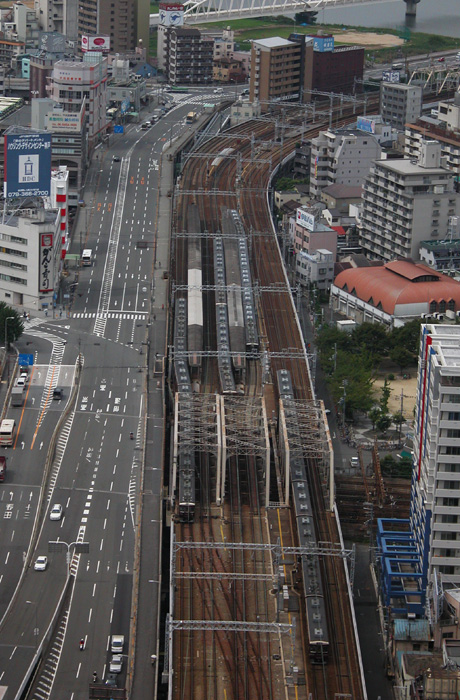
- The Kobe, Takarazuka, and Kyoto main lines in parallel near the Umeda Station terminal; Nakatsu Station in the center

Overview
- Parent company: Hankyu Hanshin Holdings (Hankyu Hanshin Toho Group)
- Headquarters: Osaka, Japan
- Locale: Kansai region, Japan
- Dates of operation: 1910 (established in 1907)–

Technical
- Track gauge: 1,435 mm (4 ft 8 1/2 in)
- Length: 138.4 km (86.0 mi)

Other
- Website: https://www.hankyu.co.jp/en/

Hankyu Corporation (阪急電鉄株式会社, Hankyū Dentetsu kabushiki gaisha; lit. 'Hankyu Electric Railway Stock Company'), trading as Hankyu Railway (阪急電鉄, Hankyū Dentetsu; lit. 'Hankyu Electric Railway'), is a Japanese private railway company that provides commuter and interurban service to the northern Kansai region, serving 1,950,000 people every weekday. Its main terminal is at Umeda Station in Osaka. The signature color of Hankyu cars is maroon.

Hankyu is owned by Hankyu Hanshin Holdings, a holding company formed in 2006 to take over the competing Hanshin Electric Railway through a tender offer. Hankyu Hanshin is one of the three core companies of the Hankyu Hanshin Toho Group, a keiretsu of independent companies that trace their roots to founder Ichizo Kobayashi. Hankyu and Hankyu Hanshin have their head offices in Kita-ku, Osaka and their registered headquarters at Ikeda Station in Ikeda, Osaka Prefecture.

Hankyu Corporation is the parent company of the Takarazuka Revue, an all-female musical theatre performance company, which was an internal division of Hankyu Corporation until its spin-off as a separate company in 2025.

== History ==
=== Etymology ===
The name Hankyu is an abbreviation of Keihanshin Kyūkō (京阪神急行).

Keihanshin (京阪神) refers to the area served by Hankyu trains, comprising the cities of Kyoto (京都), Osaka (大阪) and Kobe (神戸), along with the suburbs that connect them to each other.

Kyūkō (急行) means "express train(s)".

=== Foundation ===
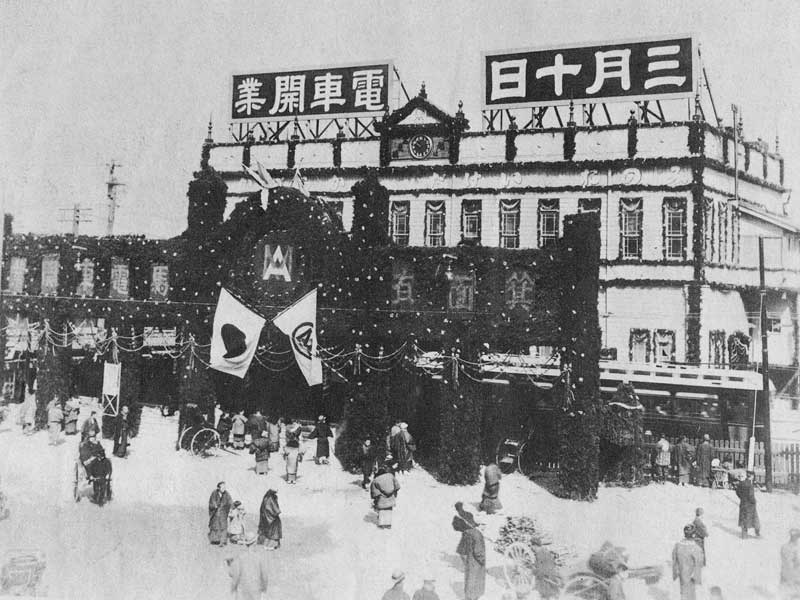
Umeda Station on the day of inauguration

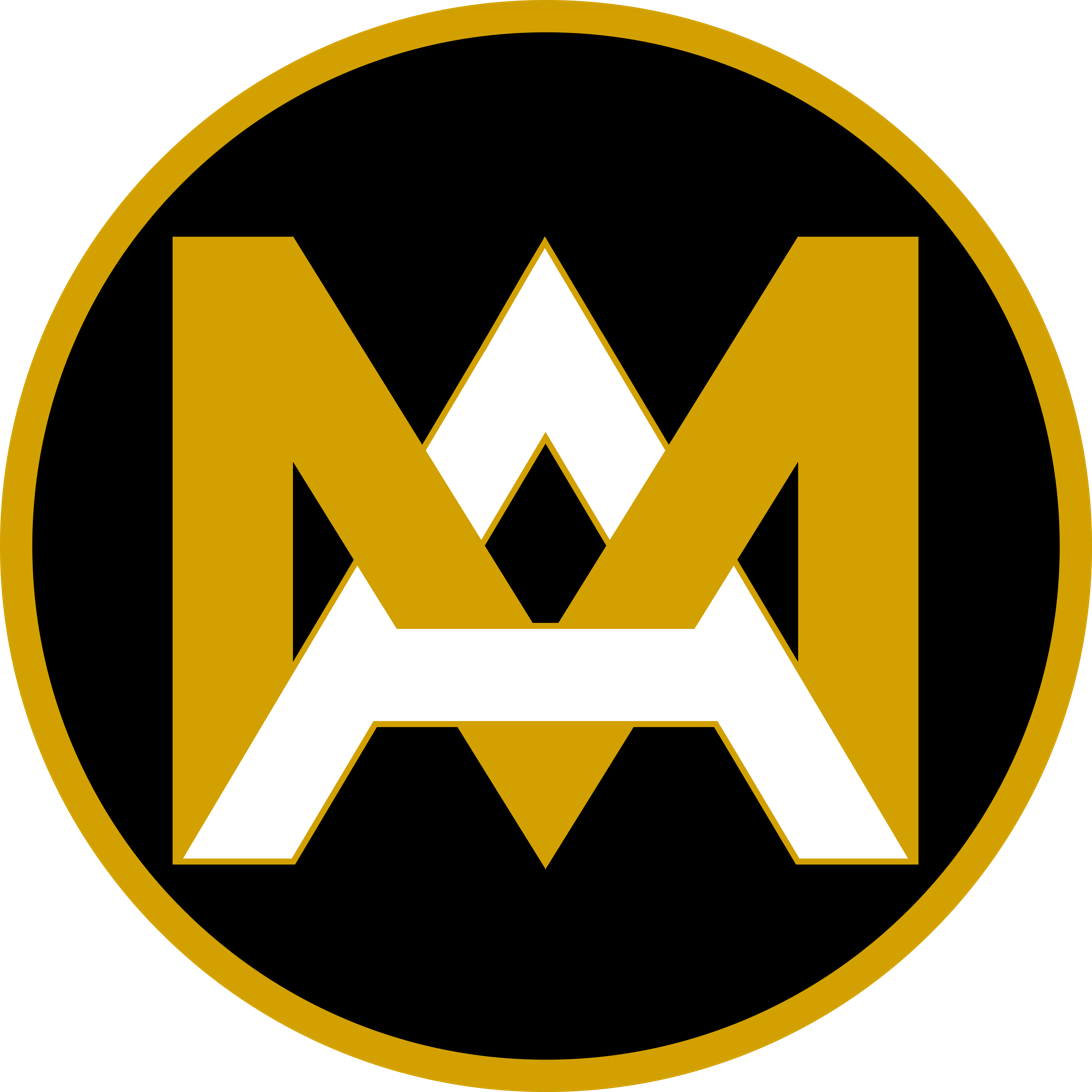
Seal of the Minoo Arima Electric Tramway

In 1907, the Minoo Arima Electric Tramway Company (箕面有馬電気軌道株式会社, Minoo Arima Denki Kidō Kabushiki-gaisha), a forerunner of Hankyu Hanshin Holdings, Inc., was established by Ichizō Kobayashi (precisely, he was one of the "promoters" of the tramway). On 10 March 1910, Minoo Arima Tramway opened the rail lines from Umeda to Takarazuka (the Takarazuka Main Line) and from Ishibashi to Minoo (the Minoo Line). The tramway was popular due to Kobayashi's pioneering act to develop housing around stations along the line (a first in Japan), a forerunner to transit-oriented developments.

=== Expansion to Kobe ===
On February 4, 1918, Minoo Arima Tramway was renamed Hanshin Kyūkō Railway Company (阪神急行電鉄株式会社, Hanshin Kyūkō Dentetsu Kabushiki-gaisha; referred to as "Hankyū", 阪急).

On July 16, 1920, the Kobe Main Line from Jūsō to Kobe (later, renamed Kamitsutsui) and the Itami Line from Tsukaguchi to Itami were opened.

On April 1, 1936, the Kobe Main Line was extended from Nishi-Nada (present-day Ōji-kōen) to the new terminal in Kobe (present-day Kobe-Sannomiya Station), and the Kobe Main Line from Nishi-Nada to Kamitsutsui was named the Kamitsutsui Line, which was abandoned on May 20, 1940.

In 1936, Hankyu established a professional baseball team and in 1937 the Nishinomiya Stadium as the team's home field was completed near Nishinomiya-Kitaguchi Station. The Hankyu Braves (named in 1947) played until the 1988 season and became the predecessors of the present-day Orix Buffaloes.

=== Merger and separation with Keihan ===
On October 1, 1943, under the order of the government, Hanshin Kyūkō and Keihan Electric Railway were merged, and renamed Keihanshin Kyūkō Railway Company (京阪神急行電鉄株式会社, Keihanshin Kyūkō Dentetsu Kabushiki-gaisha; referred to as "Keihanshin", 京阪神). The merged lines included the Keihan Main Line, the Uji Line, the Shinkeihan Line (present-day Kyoto Main Line), the Senriyama Line (present-day Senri Line), the Jūsō Line (part of Kyoto Main Line), the Arashiyama Line, the Keishin Line and the Ishiyama Sakamoto Line. The Katano Line was also added in 1945.

On December 1, 1949, the Keihan Main Line, the Katano Line, the Uji Line, the Keishin Line, and the Ishiyama-Sakamoto Line were split off to become part of the newly established Keihan Electric Railway Co., Ltd. Although this revived the former Keihan Electric Railway, Keihan was now smaller than before the 1943 merger, because the Shinkeihan Line and its branches were not given up by Keihanshin. The present structure of the Hankyu network with the three main lines was fixed by this transaction. The abbreviation of Keihanshin Kyūkō Railway was changed from "Keihanshin" to "Hankyū".

=== Postwar development ===
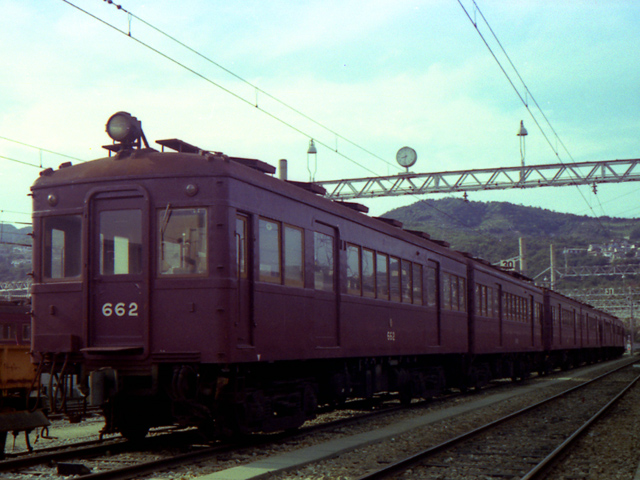
610 Series car, built 1953-56

On April 7, 1968, the Kobe Main Line started through service to the Kobe Rapid Transit Railway Tozai Line and the Sanyo Electric Railway Main Line.

On December 6, 1969, the Kyoto Main Line and the Senri Line started through service to the Osaka Municipal Subway Sakaisuji Line. In 1970, the Senri Line was one of access routes to the Expo '70 held in Senri area.

On April 1, 1973, Keihanshin Kyūkō Railway Company assumed its current name.

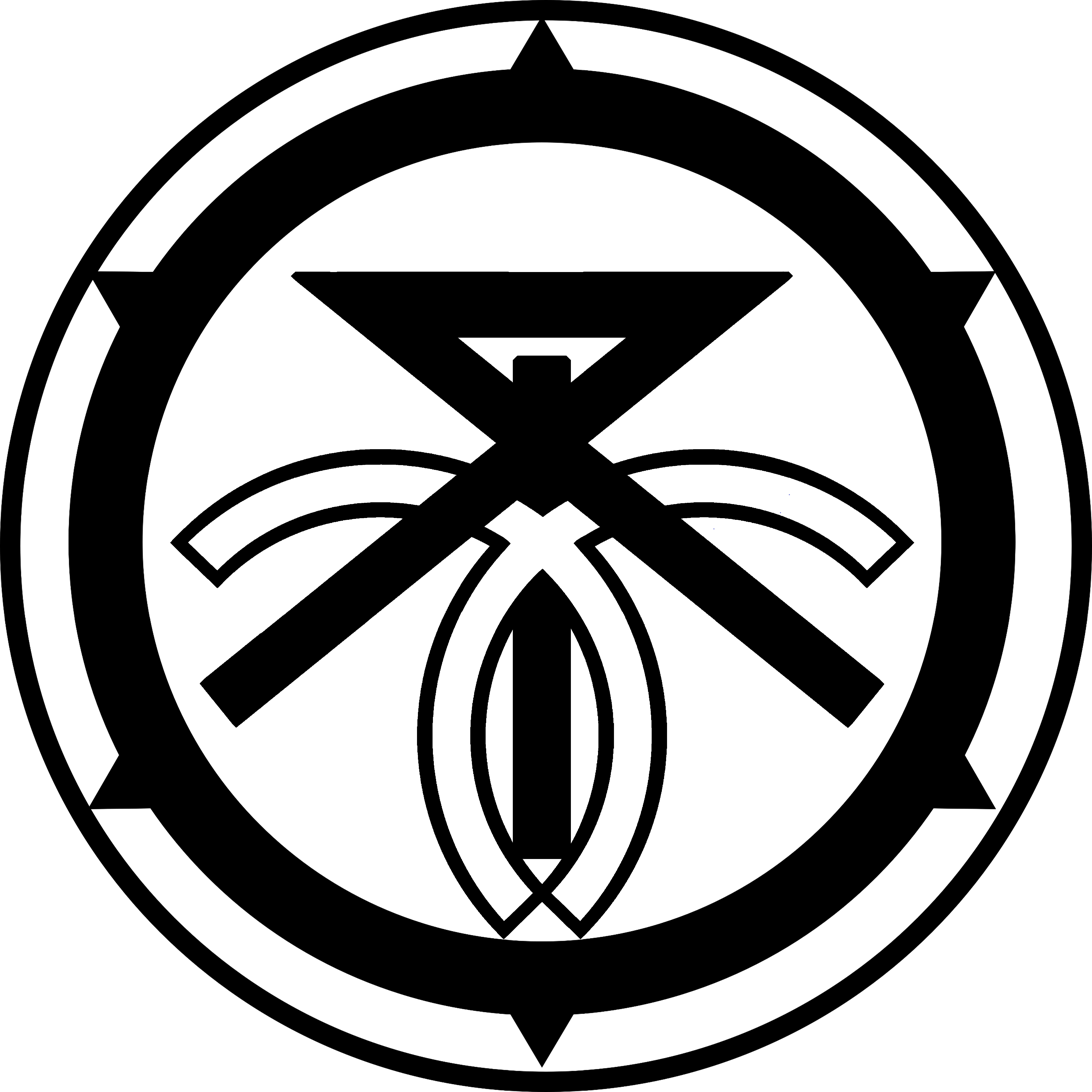
Former Hankyu logo used between 1943 and 1992. The 6-point ring stands for Kyoto, and the symbols for Osaka City and Kobe are incorporated.

On April 1, 2005, former Hankyu Corporation became a holding company and was renamed Hankyu Holdings, Inc. (阪急ホールディングス株式会社, Hankyū Hōrudhingusu Kabushiki-gaisha). The railway business was ceded to a subsidiary, now named Hankyu Corporation (before the restructuring, the new company which reused a dormant company founded on December 7, 1989, was called "Act Systems" (株式会社アクトシステムズ) until March 28, 2004, then "Hankyū Dentetsu Bunkatsu Junbi K.K." (阪急電鉄分割準備株式会社) from the next day).

On October 1, 2006, Hankyu Holdings became the wholly owning parent company of Hanshin Electric Railway Co., Ltd. and the holdings were renamed Hankyu Hanshin Holdings, Inc.. Hankyu's stock purchase of Hanshin shares was completed on June 20, 2006.

== Rail lines ==
Schematic map of Hankyu lines

Geographic map of Hankyu lines

Hankyu operates three main trunk lines, connecting Osaka with Kobe, Takarazuka and Kyoto respectively, and their branches.

Kōbe Main Line (神戸本線) (Category-1: Umeda – Kobe-sannomiya)

Itami Line (伊丹線) (Category-1: Tsukaguchi – Itami)
Imazu Line (今津線) (Category-1: Imazu – Nishinomiya-kitaguchi – Takarazuka)
Kōyō Line (甲陽線) (Category-1: Shukugawa – Kōyōen)
Kōbe Kōsoku Line (神戸高速線) (Category-2: Kobe-sannomiya – Shinkaichi, Trains are operated between Kobe-sannomiya and Shinkaichi on the Kōbe Rapid Transit Railway Tōzai Line)

Takarazuka Main Line (宝塚本線) (Category-1: Umeda – Takarazuka)

Minoh Line (箕面線) (Category-1: Ishibashi – Minoo)

Kyoto Main Line (京都本線) (Category-1: Umeda – Kawaramachi)

Senri Line (千里線) (Category-1: Tenjimbashisuji Roku-chome – Awaji – Kita-Senri)
Arashiyama Line (嵐山線) (Category-1: Katsura – Arashiyama)

The three groups of the lines, the Kobe Lines, the Takarazuka Lines and the Kyoto Lines, can be further grouped into two, the Kobe-Takarazuka Lines and the Kyoto Lines from a historical reason. Hankyu has two groups of rolling stock, one for the Kobe-Takarazuka Lines and the other for the Kyoto Lines.

Nose Electric Railway (Category-1: Kawanishi-Noseguchi – Myōkenguchi/Nissei-Chūō) works as a feeder of the Takarazuka Main Line although it is a separate railway company under control of Hankyu.

=== Former lines ===
==== Abandoned lines ====
- Kitano Line (Umeda – Kitano)
- Kamitsutsui Line (Nishi-Nada (Ōji-kōen) – Kamitsutsui)

==== Transferred lines ====
- Keihan Line
  - Keihan Main Line (Temmabashi – Sanjō)
  - Katano Line (Hirakatashi – Kisaichi)
  - Uji Line (Chūshojima – Uji)
- Ōtsu Line
  - Keishin Line (Sanjō – Hamaōtsu)
  - Ishiyama Sakamoto Line (Ishiyamadera – Sakamoto)

The Keihan and Ōtsu Lines were transferred to Keihan Electric Railway Co., Ltd. which separated from Keihanshin Kyūkō (now Hankyu) on December 1, 1949.

== Rolling stock ==
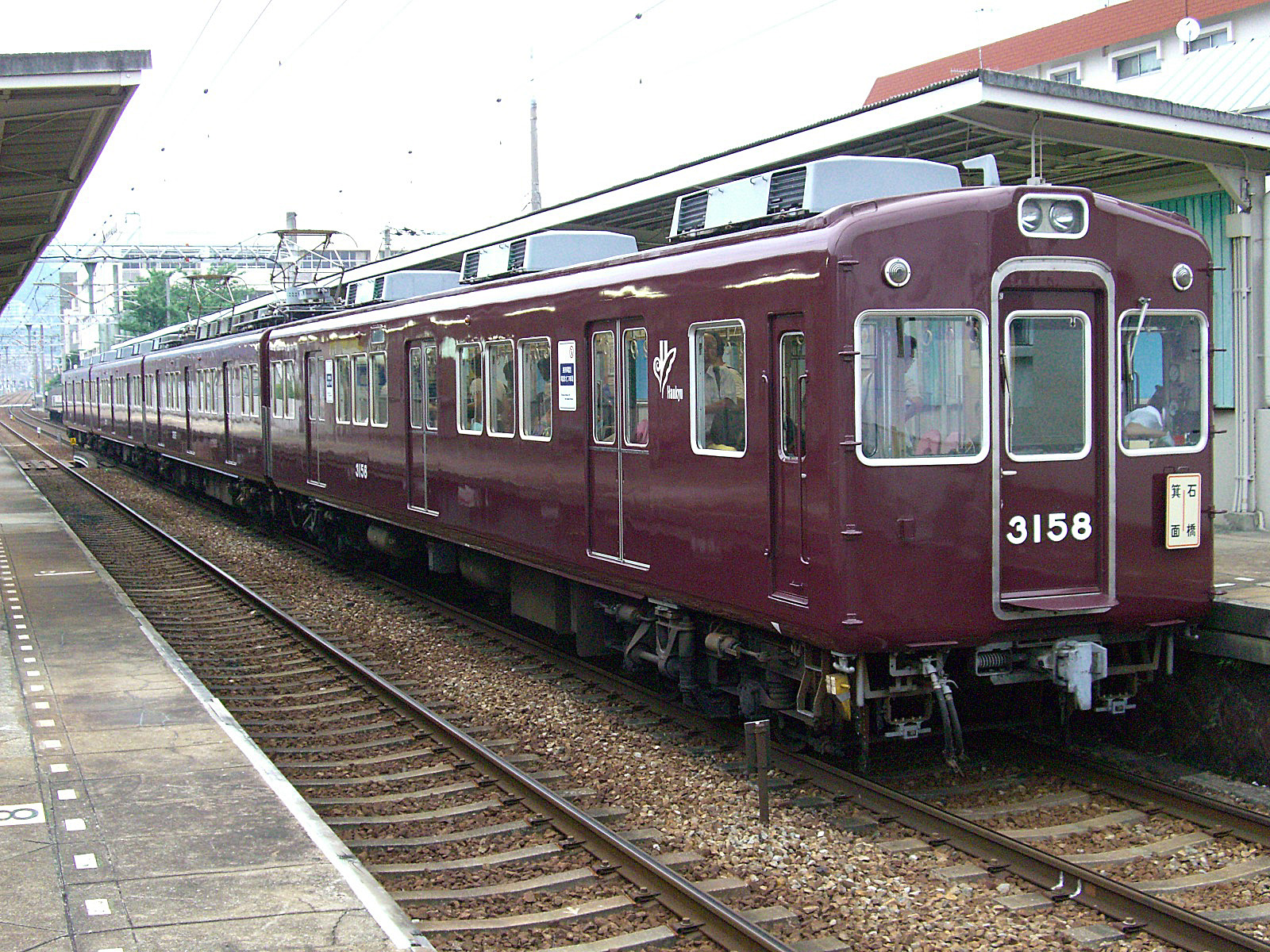
3100 series

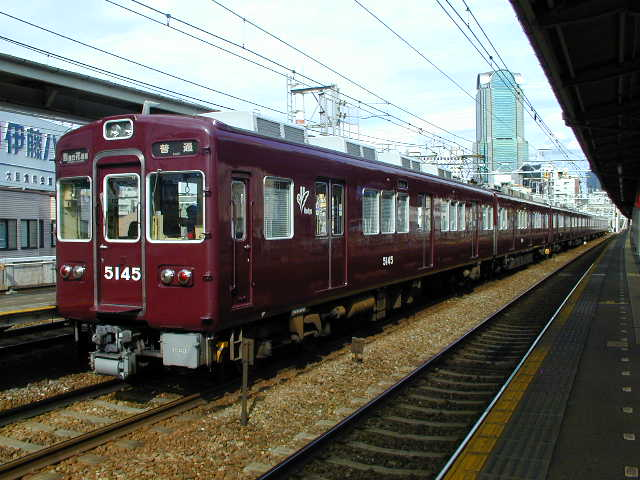
5100 series

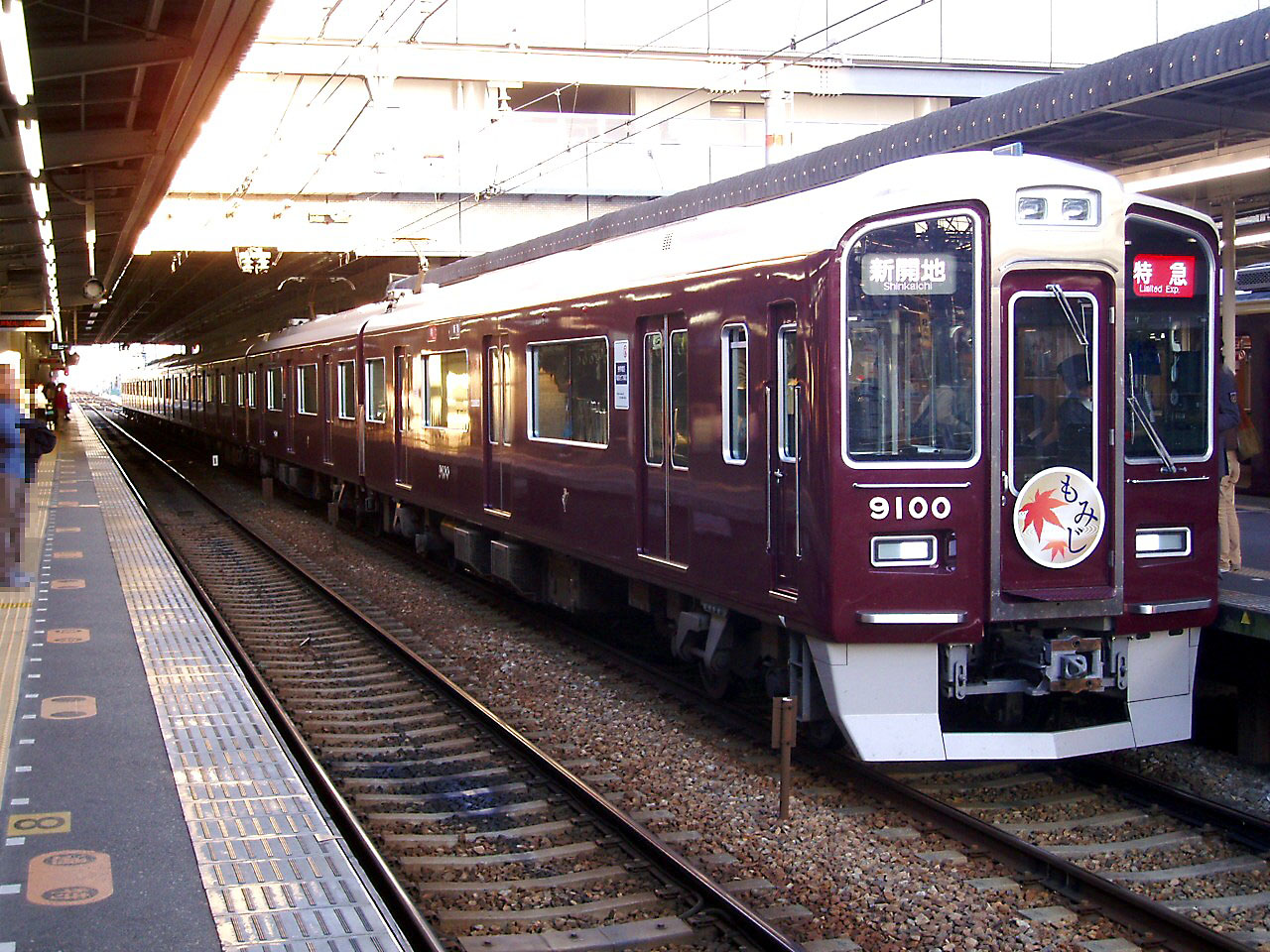
9000 series

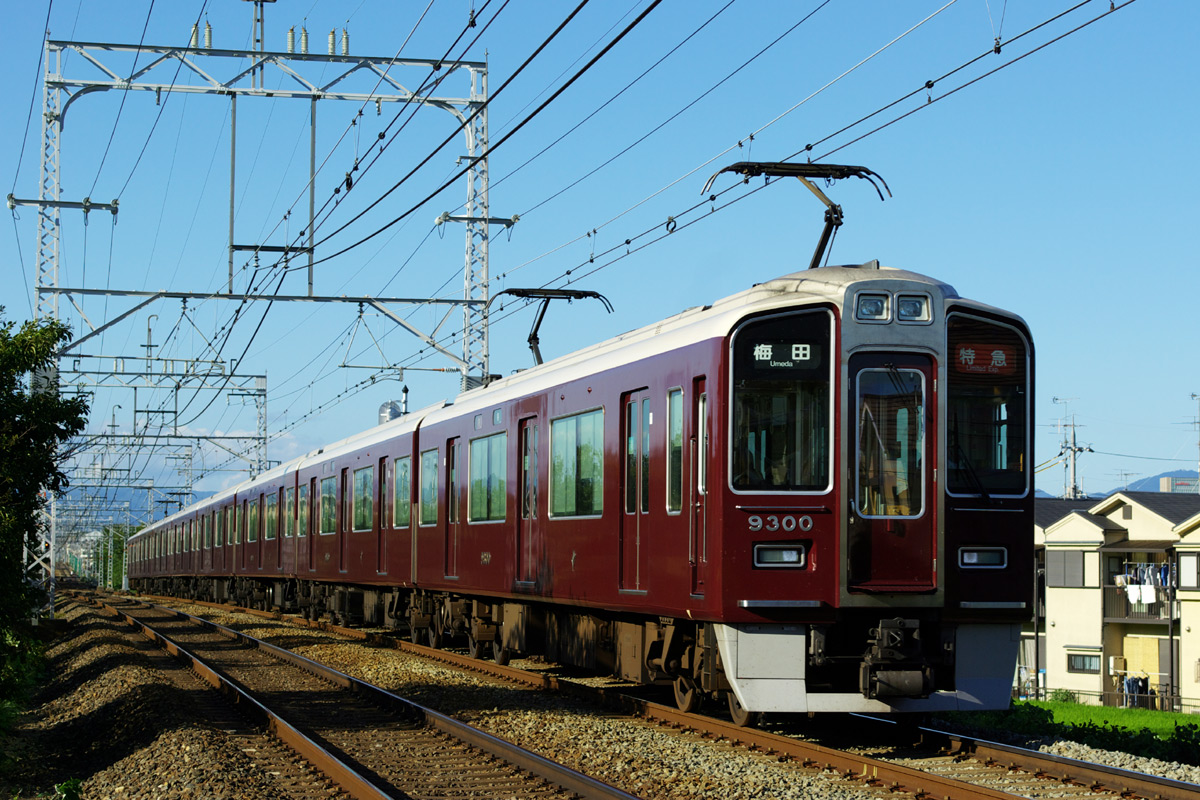
9300 series

As of March 31, 2010, Hankyu had 1,319 cars for passenger service. Standard cars have three pairs of doors per side and bench seating facing the center of the train (exceptions are noted below). The Kobe Line and Takarazuka Line use the same fleet.

Some former Hankyu trains, such as the 2000 series (1960) and 3100 series, have been transferred to the Nose Electric Railway.

=== Kobe Line/Takarazuka Line ===
- 1000 series
- 2000 series (2025)
- 3000 series
- 3100 series
- 5000 series
- 5100 series
- 6000 series
- 7000 series
- 8000 series (includes small number of transverse seating cars)
- 8200 series
- 9000 series

=== Kyoto Line ===
- 1300 series (from spring 2014)
- 2300 series
- 3300 series
- 5300 series
- 6300 series (two doors per side, transverse seating)
- 7300 series
- 8300 series
- 9300 series (transverse seating)

== Fares ==
Single fare (adult) in Japanese Yen by travel distance is as follows. Fares for children (6–11 years old) are half the adult fare, rounded up to the nearest 10 yen.

Current and historical Hankyu Railway fares
Distance	Fare (in JPY), effective		
Distance	1 October 2019	1 April 2014	1 April 1997
1–4 km (1–2 mi)	160	150	150
5–9 km (3–6 mi)	190	190	180
10–14 km (6–9 mi)	230	220	220
15–19 km (9–12 mi)	270	270	260
20–26 km (12–16 mi)	280	280	270
27–33 km (17–21 mi)	320	320	310
34–42 km (21–26 mi)	380	370	360
43–51 km (27–32 mi)	400	400	390
52–60 km (32–37 mi)	470	470	450
61–70 km (38–43 mi)	530	530	510
71–76 km (44–47 mi)	630	620	600

For fare collection, IC cards (PiTaPa, ICOCA and others) are accepted. Contactless payment (credit/debit/prepaid cards and compatible smartphones) is also accepted at designated ticket gates.

The fare rate was changed on April 1, 2014, to reflect the change in the rate of consumption tax from 5% to 8%, and again on October 1, 2019, from 8% to 10%.

== In popular culture ==
A 2-car Hankyu train was featured in the 1988 Japanese animated war drama Grave of the Fireflies.

Hankyu trains appear in the Japanese animated series The Melancholy of Haruhi Suzumiya.

In the 1999 film, 10 Things I Hate About You, the character Bianca Stratford, played by Larisa Oleynik, is seen wearing a shirt reading “阪急 電車” translating to Hankyu Railway. This can be seen at 1:27:23 in the film.

One 2008 book by the Japanese writer Hiro Arikawa, Hankyu Densha, occurs entirely on the Hankyu–Imazu line, in the north-west suburbs of Osaka, where various characters meet and interact in the trains and at the various stations of the line. It was made into a film in 2011, titled Hankyu Railway: A 15-Minute Miracle.

The Hankyu 2000 is the locomotive of choice for Takumi Fujiwara, the main character in Densha de D, a parody of Initial D where the main characters race with trains instead of cars.

== See also ==
- Transport in Keihanshin
- Hankyu Hanshin Toho Group
- Hankyu Hanshin Holdings
