= Tsuzumigataki Station =

Railway station in Kawanishi, Hyōgo Prefecture, Japan

Tsuzumigataki Station 鼓滝駅
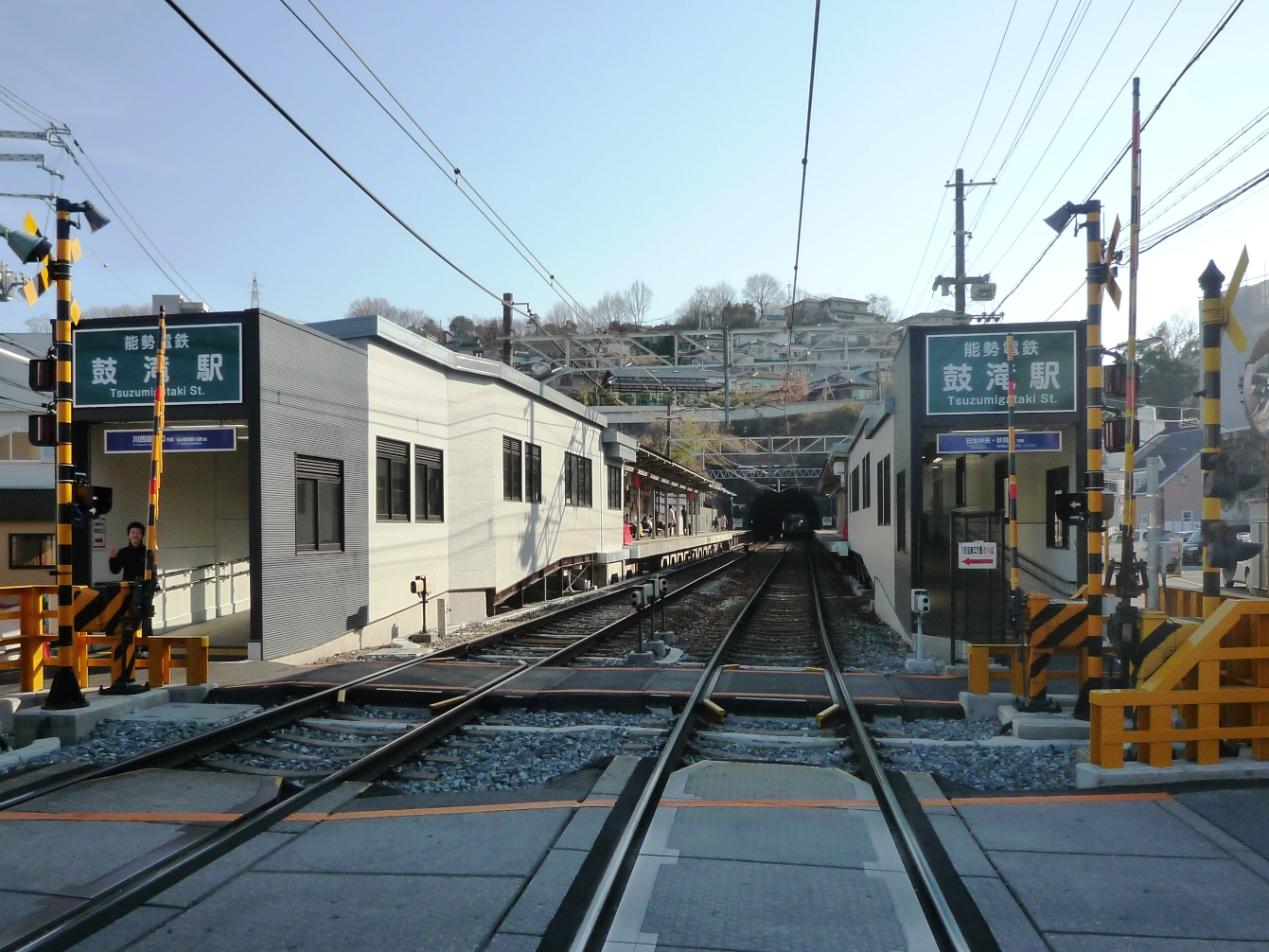
- Tsuzumigataki Station, February 2010

General information
- Location: 1-chōme-5 Tsuzumigataki, Kawanishi-shi, Hyōgo-ken 666-0123; Japan
- Coordinates: 34°51′17.01″N 135°25′5.88″E
- Operator: Nosé Electric Railway
- Line: ■ Myōken Line
- Distance: 3.5 km (2.2 miles) from Kawanishi-Noseguchi
- Platforms: 2 side platforms

Other information
- Status: Unstaffed
- Station code: NS05
- Website: Official website

History
- Opened: 13 April 1913; 113 years ago

Passengers
- FY2019: 5,413 daily

Services
Preceding station	Nosé Electric Railway	Following station
Uguisunomori towards Kawanishi-Noseguchi	Myōken Line Local	Tada towards Myōkenguchi
Location
- Location within Hyōgo Prefecture Location within Japan

Tsuzumigataki Station (鼓滝駅, Tsuzumigataki-eki) is a passenger railway station located in the city of Kawanishi, Hyōgo Prefecture, Japan. It is operated by the private transportation company Nose Electric Railway.

== Lines ==
Tsuzumigataki Station is served by the Myōken Line, and is located 3.5 kilometers (2.2 mi) from the terminus of the line at Kawanishi-Noseguchi.

== Station layout ==
The station two opposed ground-level side platforms, connected by an underground passage. The station is unattended.

=== Platforms ===
1	■ Myoken Line	for Yamashita Myōkenguchi, Nissei Chūō
2	■ Myoken Line	from Nissei Chūō for Kawanishi-noseguchi

== History ==
Tsuzumigataki Station opened on 13 April 1913. It was relocated to its present location on 25 May 1969.

== Passenger statistics ==
In fiscal 2019, the station was used by an average of 5413 passengers daily

== Surrounding area ==
- Aeon Town Kawanishi

== See also ==
- List of railway stations in Japan
