= Uguisunomori Station =

Railway station in Kawanishi, Hyōgo Prefecture, Japan

Uguisunomori Station 鶯の森駅
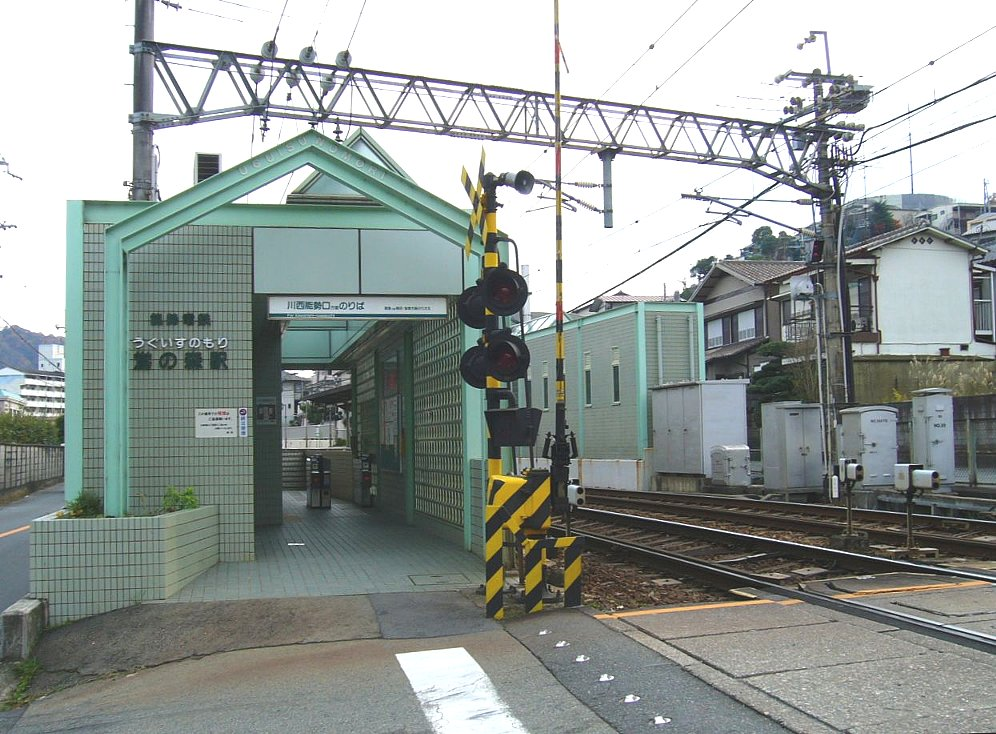
- Uguisunomori Station, December 2006

General information
- Location: 7 Uguisunomorichō, Kawanishi-shi, Hyōgo-ken 666-0001; Japan
- Coordinates: 34°50′52.62″N 135°25′8.09″E
- Operator: Nosé Electric Railway
- Line: ■ Myōken Line
- Distance: 2.7 km (1.7 miles) from Kawanishi-Noseguchi
- Platforms: 2 side platforms

Other information
- Status: Unstaffed
- Station code: NS04
- Website: Official website

History
- Opened: 21 August 1953; 73 years ago

Passengers
- FY2019: 1056 daily

Services
Preceding station	Nosé Electric Railway	Following station
Takiyama towards Kawanishi-Noseguchi	Myōken Line Local	Tsuzumigataki towards Myōkenguchi
Location
- Location within Hyōgo Prefecture Location within Japan

Uguisunomori Station (鶯の森駅, Uguisunomori-eki) is a passenger railway station located in the city of Kawanishi, Hyōgo Prefecture, Japan. It is operated by the private transportation company Nose Electric Railway.

== Lines ==
Uguisunomori Station is served by the Myōken Line, and is located 2.7 kilometers (1.7 mi) from the terminus of the line at Kawanishi-Noseguchi.

== Station layout ==
The station two opposed unnumbered ground-level side platforms. The platforms have an effective length of six cars, but currently only four-car trains stop. Each platform has its own ticket gate, and t is not possible to change platforms within the station. The station is unattended.

=== Platforms ===
1	■ Myoken Line	for Yamashita Myōkenguchi, Nissei Chūō
2	■ Myoken Line	from Nissei Chūō for Kawanishi-noseguchi

== History ==
Uguisunomori Station opened on 21 August 1953.

== Passenger statistics ==
In fiscal 2019, the station was used by an average of 1056 passengers daily

== Surrounding area ==
The station is located in a suburban residential area.

== See also ==
- List of railway stations in Japan
