= Kinunobebashi Station =

Railway station in Kawanishi, Hyōgo Prefecture, Japan

Kinunobebashi Station 絹延橋駅
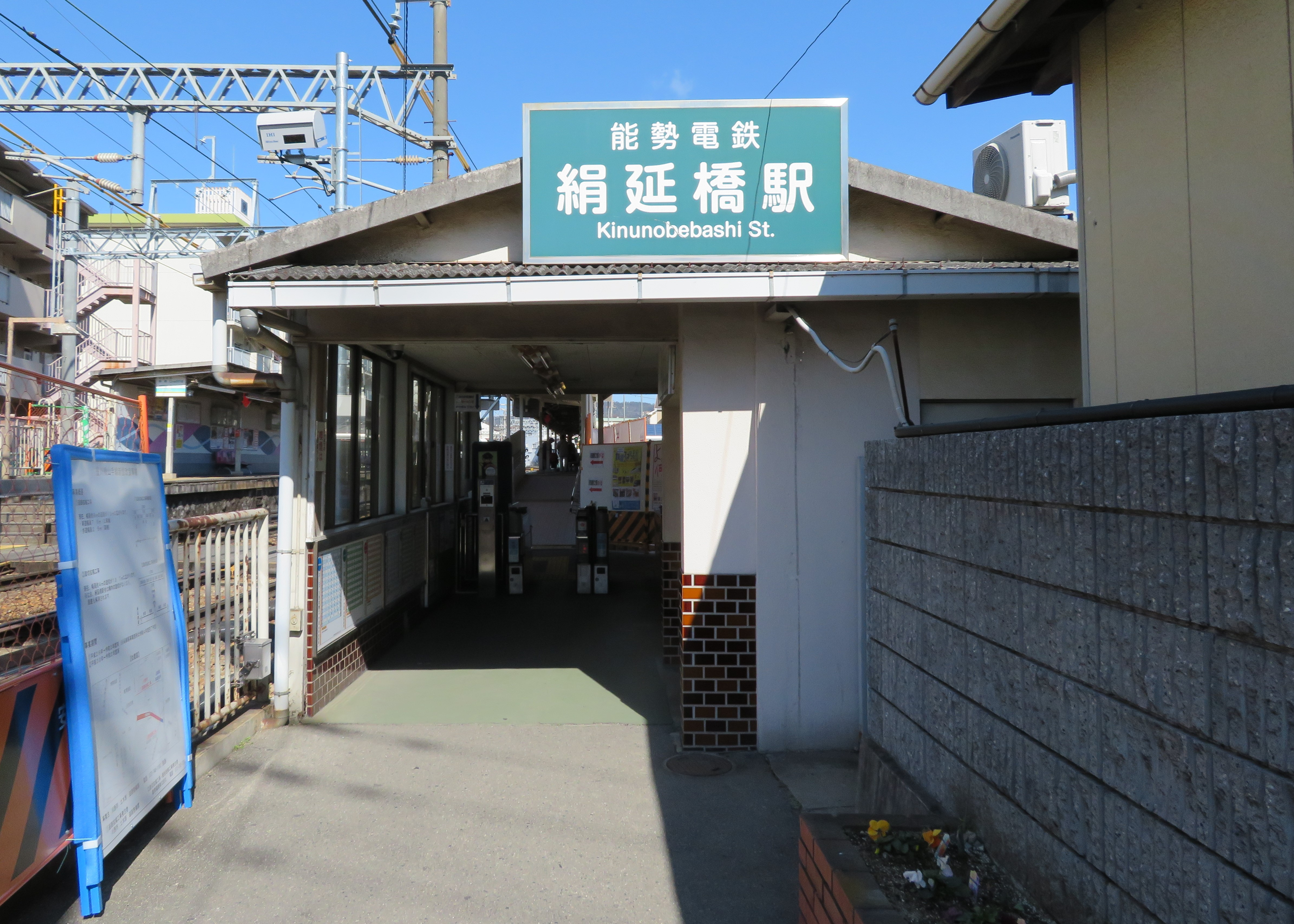
- Kinunobebashi Station, February 2020

General information
- Location: 4 Kinunobechō, Kawanishi-shi, Hyōgo-ken 666-0012; Japan
- Coordinates: 34°50′3.75″N 135°25′22.98″E
- Operator: Nosé Electric Railway
- Line: ■ Myōken Line
- Distance: 1.2 km (0.75 miles) from Kawanishi-Noseguchi
- Platforms: 2 side platforms

Other information
- Status: Unstaffed
- Station code: NS02
- Website: Official website

History
- Opened: 13 April 1913; 113 years ago

Passengers
- FY2019: 2035 daily

Services
Preceding station	Nosé Electric Railway	Following station
Kawanishi-Noseguchi Terminus	Myōken Line Local	Takiyama towards Myōkenguchi
Location
- Location within Hyōgo Prefecture Location within Japan

Kinunobebashi Station (絹延橋駅, Kinunobebashi-eki) is a passenger railway station located in the city of Kawanishi, Hyōgo Prefecture, Japan. It is operated by the private transportation company Nose Electric Railway.

== Lines ==
Kinunobebashi Station is served by the Myōken Line, and is located 1.2 kilometers (0.75 mi) from the terminus of the line at Kawanishi-Noseguchi.

== Station layout ==
The station two unnumbered opposed ground-level side platforms. There is no connection between platforms. The platforms have an effective length of 6 cars, but currently only 4-car trains stop. The station is unattended.

=== Platforms ===
1	■ Myoken Line	for Yamashita Myōkenguchi, Nissei Chūō
2	■ Myoken Line	from Nissei Chūō for Kawanishi-noseguchi

== History ==
Kinunobebashi Station opened on 13 April 1913.

== Passenger statistics ==
In fiscal 2019, the station was used by an average of 2035 passengers daily

== Surrounding area ==
This station is located near the prefectural border between Kawanishi and the city of Ikeda, Osaka, and about 50 meters to the east is the Kinenbashi Bridge, which gave the station its name.

- Kawanishi Municipal Kinen Housing Complex

== See also ==
- List of railway stations in Japan
