= NS9 =

NS9, NS-9, NS 9, NS.9, or, variation, may refer to:

== Places ==
- Woodlands MRT station (station code: NS9), Woodlands, Singapore
- Uneno Station (station code: NS09), Kawanishi, Hyōgo Prefecture, Japan
- Maruyama Station (Saitama), station code: NS09; Ina, Saitama, Japan
- Clayton Park West (electoral district), constituency N.S. 09; Nova Scotia, Canada

== Aerospace ==
- Northrop NS-9, U.S. flying wing bomber
- RAF N.S. 9, a British NS class airship
- Blue Origin NS-9, a 2018 July 18 Blue Origin suborbital spaceflight mission for the New Shepard

== Other uses ==
- Netscape Navigator 9, a webbrowser

== See also ==
- NS (disambiguation)
- 9 (disambiguation)
