= NS7 =

NS7, NS-7, NS.7, NS 7, or, variation, may refer to:

== Places ==
- Kranji MRT station (station code: NS7), Sungei Kadut, Singapore
- Hirano Station (Hyōgo), station code: NS07; Kawanishi, Hyōgo Prefecture, Japan
- Haraichi Station (station code: NS07), Ageo, Saitama, Japan
- Chester-St. Margaret's (constituency N.S. 07), Nova Scotia, Canada

== Transportation ==
- Blue Origin NS-7, a 2017 December 17 Blue Origin suborbital spaceflight mission for the New Shepard
- RAF N.S. 7, a British NS class airship
- Škoda Kodiaq (model NS7), midsized crossover SUV

== Other uses ==
- Netscape 7, webbrowser
- BRAF (gene), a.k.a. "NS7"
- New Penguin Shakespeare volume 7

== See also ==
- NS (disambiguation)
- 7 (disambiguation)
