= NS8 =

NS8, NS-8, NS.8, NS 8, or, variation, may refer to:

== Places ==
- Marsiling MRT station (station code: NS8), Woodlands, Singapore
- Ichinotorii Station (station code: NS08), Kawanishi, Hyōgo Prefecture, Japan
- Shōnan Station (station code: NS08), Ageo, Saitama, Japan
- Clare-Digby (constituency N.S. 08), Nova Scotia, Canada

== Transportation ==
- Stagecoach Gold bus line NS8
- Blue Origin NS-8, a 2018 April 29 Blue Origin suborbital spaceflight mission for the New Shepard
- RAF N.S. 8, a British NS class airship

== Other uses ==
- RIT1 gene and GTP-binding protein Rit1, also called "NS8"
- Betacoronavirus NS8 protein
- Travan NS8, data backup tape standard
- Netscape Browser (Netscape 8) webbrowser
- New Penguin Shakespeare volume 8

== See also ==
- NS (disambiguation)
- 8 (disambiguation)
