= NS11 =

NS11, NS-11, NS 11, NS.11, or variations, may refer to:

== Places ==
- Sembawang MRT station (station code: NS11), Sembawang, Singapore
- Sasabe Station (station code: NS11), Kawanishi, Hyōgo Prefecture, Japan
- Ina-Chūō Station (station code: NS11), Ina, Saitama, Japan
- Colchester North (provincial electoral district), constituency N.S. 11; Nova Scotia, Canada
- Commewijne District (FIPS region code NS11), Suriname

== Other uses ==
- Blue Origin NS-11, a 2019 May 2 Blue Origin suborbital spaceflight mission for the New Shepard
- RAF airship N.S. 11, a North Sea class blimp

== See also ==
- NS (disambiguation)
- 11 (disambiguation)
