= NS21 =

NS21, NS 21, NS-21, NS.21, or variation, may refer to:

== Places ==
- Newton MRT station (station code: NS21), Newton, Singapore; a mass transit station
- Nissei-chuo Station (station code: NS21), Inagawa, Hyōgo, Japan; a train station
- Eastern Shore (electoral district) (constituency N.S. 21), Nova Scotia, Canada; a provincial electoral district

== Other uses ==
- New Penguin Shakespeare volume 21
- Blue Origin NS-21, a suborbital spaceflight using the New Shepard rocket

== See also ==
- NS (disambiguation)
- 21 (disambiguation)
