= NS12 =

NS12, NS-12, NS 12, or NS.12 may refer to:

== Places ==
- Canberra MRT station (station code: NS12), Sembawang, Singapore
- Kōfūdai Station (Osaka) (station code: NS12), Toyono, Toyono District, Osaka Prefecture, Japan
- Hanuki Station (station code: NS12), Ina, Saitama, Japan
- Cole Harbour-Eastern Passage (constituency N.S. 12), Nova Scotia, Canada
- Coronie District (FIPS region code NS12), Suriname

== Other uses ==
- Blue Origin NS-12, a 2019 December 11 Blue Origin suborbital spaceflight mission for the New Shepard
- RAF N.S. 12, a British NS class airship
- SSOR NS12, a low-floor electric bus
- New Penguin Shakespeare volume 12

== See also ==
- NS (disambiguation)
- 12 (disambiguation)
