= Hirano Station (Hyōgo) =

Railway station in Kawanishi, Hyōgo Prefecture, Japan

Hirano Station 平野駅
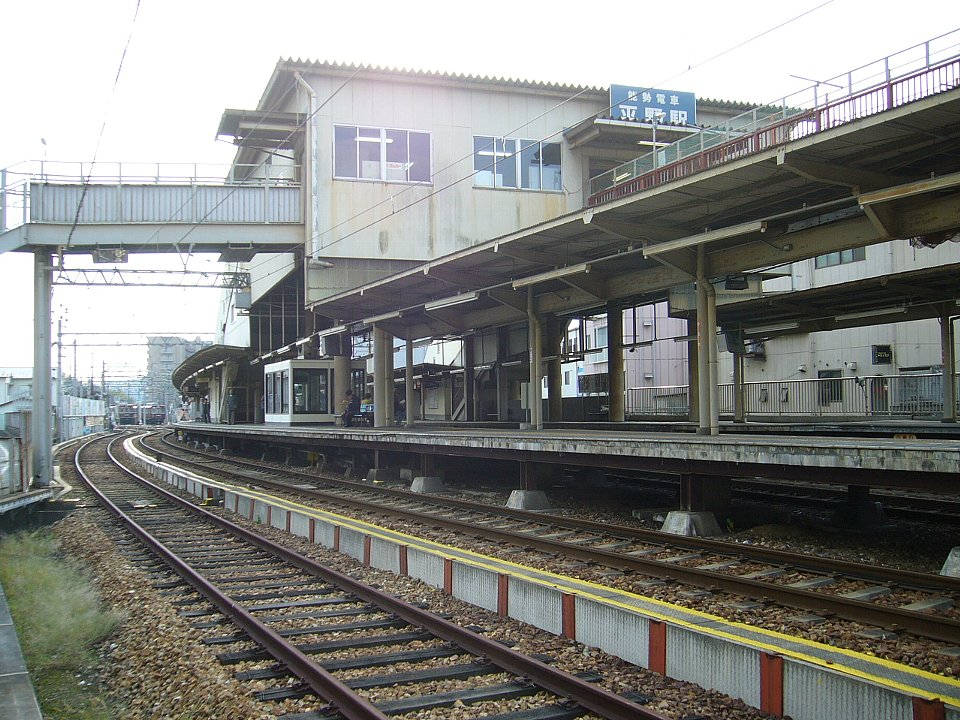
- Hirano Station, December 2006

General information
- Location: 1-36-1 Hirano, Kawanishi-shi, Hyōgo-ken 666-0121; Japan
- Coordinates: 34°52′08″N 135°25′03″E
- Operator: Nosé Electric Railway
- Line: Myōken Line
- Distance: 5.2 km (3.2 miles) from Kawanishi-Noseguchi
- Platforms: 1 side + 1 island platforms

Other information
- Status: Staffed
- Station code: NS07
- Website: Official website

History
- Opened: 13 April 1913; 113 years ago

Passengers
- FY2019: 6,743 daily

Services
Preceding station	Nosé Electric Railway	Following station
Kawanishi-Noseguchi Terminus	Nissei Express	Uneno towards Nissei-chuo
Kawanishi-Noseguchi Terminus	Myōken Line Limited Express	Uneno towards Myōkenguchi
Kawanishi-Noseguchi Terminus	Myōken Line Myoken Express	Ichinotorii towards Myōkenguchi
Tada towards Kawanishi-Noseguchi	Myōken Line Local	Ichinotorii towards Myōkenguchi
Location
- Location within Hyōgo Prefecture Location within Japan

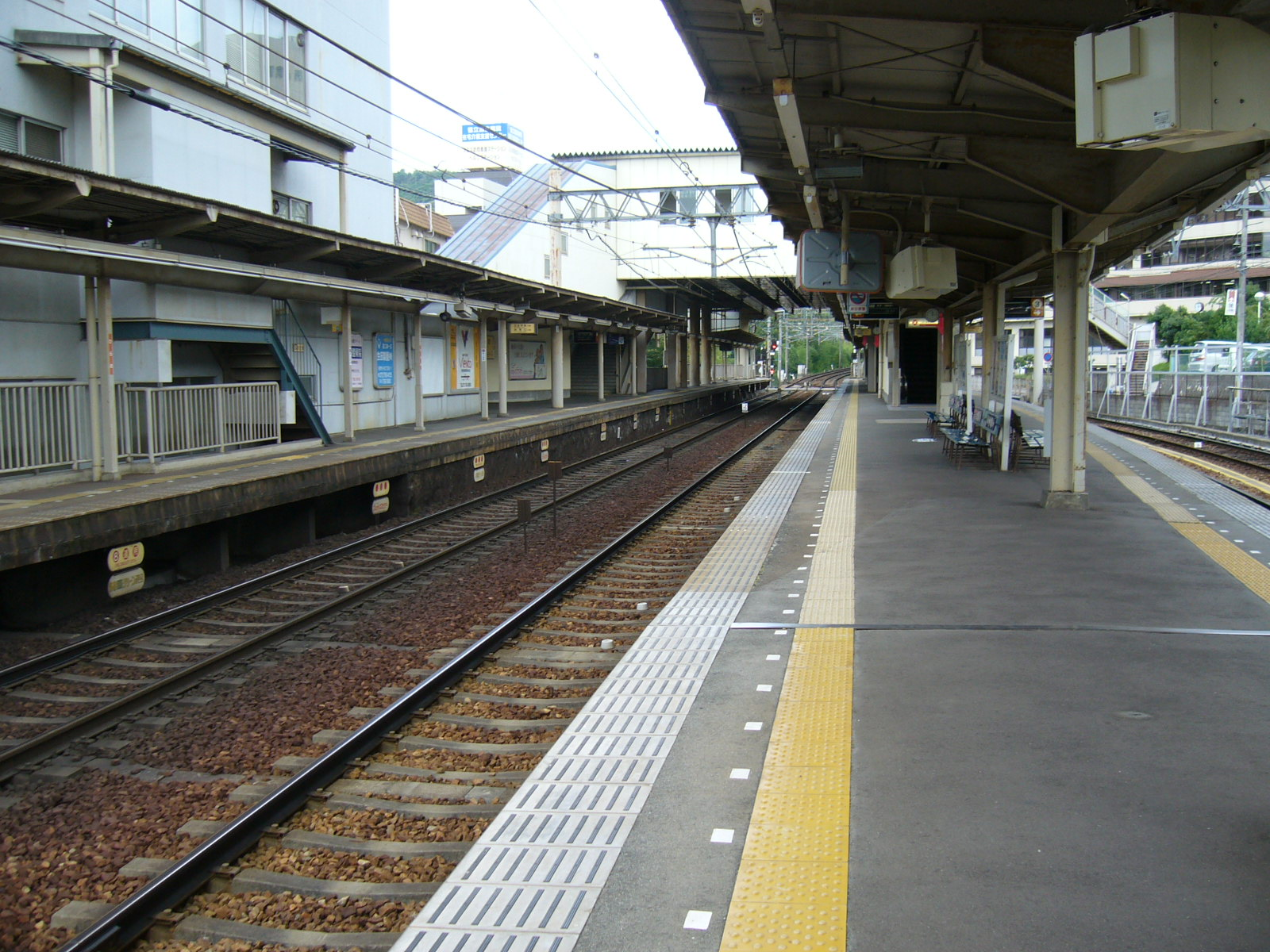
Platforms

Hirano Station (平野駅, Hirano-eki) is a passenger railway station located in the city of Kawanishi, Hyōgo Prefecture, Japan. It is operated by the private transportation company Nose Electric Railway.

== Lines ==
Hirano Station is served by the Myōken Line, and is located 5.2 kilometers (3.2 mi) from the terminus of the line at Kawanishi-Noseguchi.

== Station layout ==
The station consists of one side platform and one island platform, connected by an elevated station building. The station is staffed.

=== Platforms ===
1	■ Myoken Line	to Yamashita, Myōkenguchi and Nissei Chūō
2	■ Myoken Line	for Kawanishi-noseguchi
3	■ Myoken Line	for starting trains in either direction

== History ==
Hirano Station opened on 13 April 1913. The existing station building was completed in March 1981.

== Passenger statistics ==
In fiscal 2019, the station was used by an average of 6,743 passengers daily

== Surrounding area ==
- Nose Electric Railway Headquarters
- Kyoritsu Onsen Hospital

== See also ==
- List of railway stations in Japan
