= Uneno Station =

Railway station in Kawanishi, Hyōgo Prefecture, Japan

Uneno Station 畦野駅
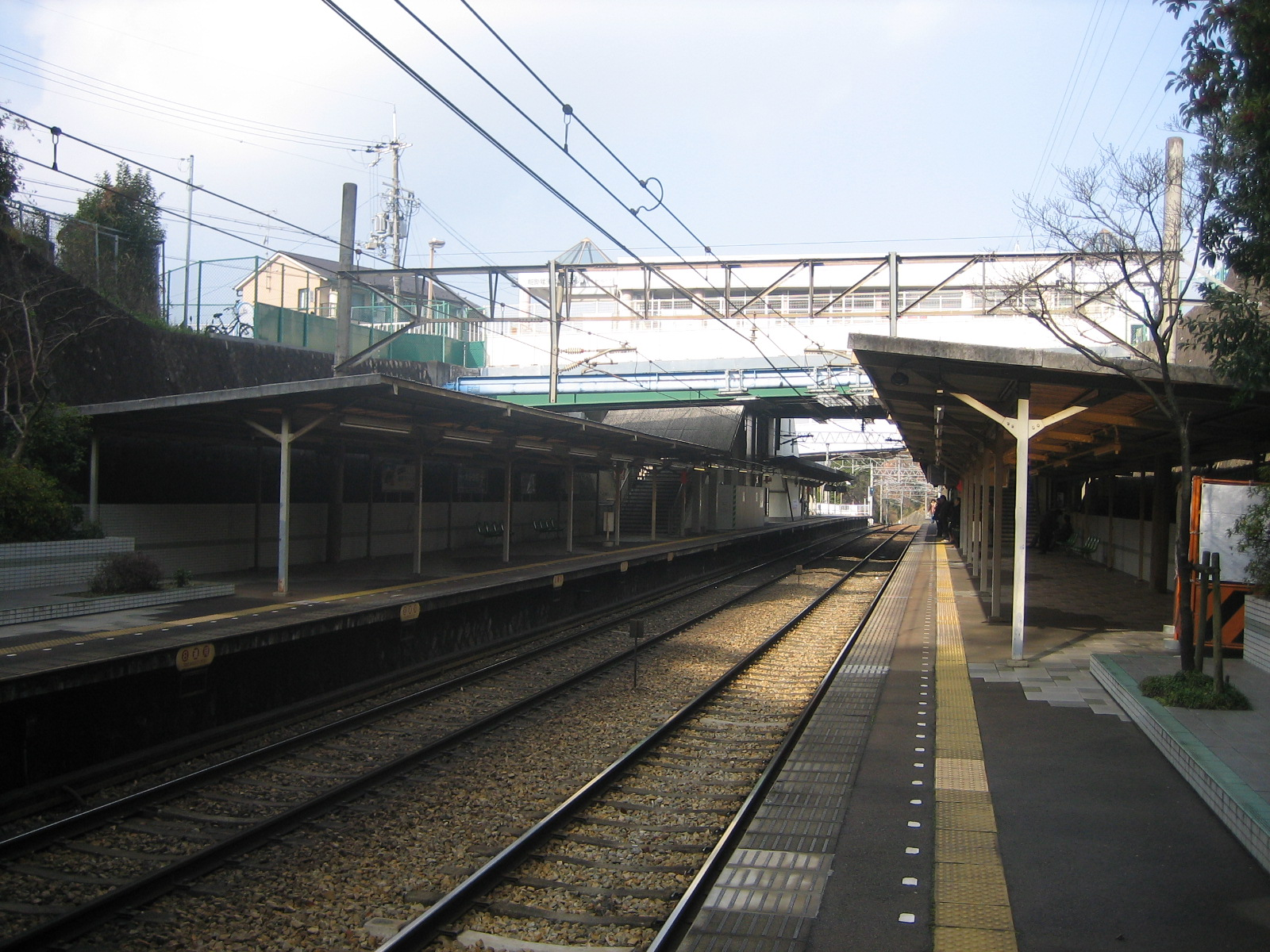
- Uneno Station, April, 2010

General information
- Location: 2-chōme-2 Higashiuneno, Kawanishi-shi, Hyōgo-ken 666-0117; Japan
- Coordinates: 34°53′37.59″N 135°24′58.58″E
- Operator: Nose Electric Railway
- Line: ■ Myōken Line
- Distance: 7.1 km (4.4 miles) from Kawanishi-Noseguchi
- Platforms: 2 side platforms

Other information
- Status: Unstaffed
- Station code: NS09
- Website: Official website

History
- Opened: 3 November 1923; 102 years ago

Passengers
- FY2019: 7,705 daily
Location
- Location within Hyōgo Prefecture Location within Japan

Uneno Station (畦野駅, Uneno-eki) is a passenger railway station located in the city of Kawanishi, Hyōgo Prefecture, Japan. It is operated by the private transportation company Nose Electric Railway.

== Lines ==
Uneno Station is served by the Myōken Line, and is located 7.1 kilometers (4.4 mi) from the terminus of the line at Kawanishi-Noseguchi.

== Station layout ==
The station consists of two opposed side platforms, connected by the station building. The east exit side of the station is on a hill, and there is a plaza in front of the station that is the same height as the ticket gates, and the bus terminal is on this side. Barrier-free construction was completed in 2010, and elevators, multifunctional toilets, and two-level handrails were newly installed. Combined with the up and down escalators that have been installed on both platforms, it can be said that the station is the most barrier-free station on the Nose Electric Railway. Toilets are inside the ticket gates, and there is a waiting room under the escalator on the platform. There is a coffee shop as a tenant on the east exit side outside the ticket gate. The effective length of both platforms is 8 cars, as it is a stop for the 8-car limited express Hinase Express. The southern end of the platform touches a tunnel (Uneno Tunnel). All trains operated by Nose Electric Railway, including the Nissei Express, stop at this station.

== Adjacent stations ==
«	Service	»
Nose Railway Myōken Line
Hirano	Limited Express	Yamashita
Hirano	Nissei Express	Yamashita
Ichinotorii	Myoken Express	Yamashita
Ichinotorii	Local	Yamashita

== History ==
Uneno Station opened on 3 November 1923. It was relocated to its present location on 19 May 1974.

== Passenger statistics ==
In fiscal 2019, the station was used by an average of 7,705 passengers daily

== Surrounding area ==
- Hyogo Prefectural Route 721 Kawanishi Interchange Line

== See also ==
- List of railway stations in Japan
