= Sasabe Station =

Railway station in Kawanishi, Hyōgo Prefecture, Japan

Sasabe Station 笹部駅
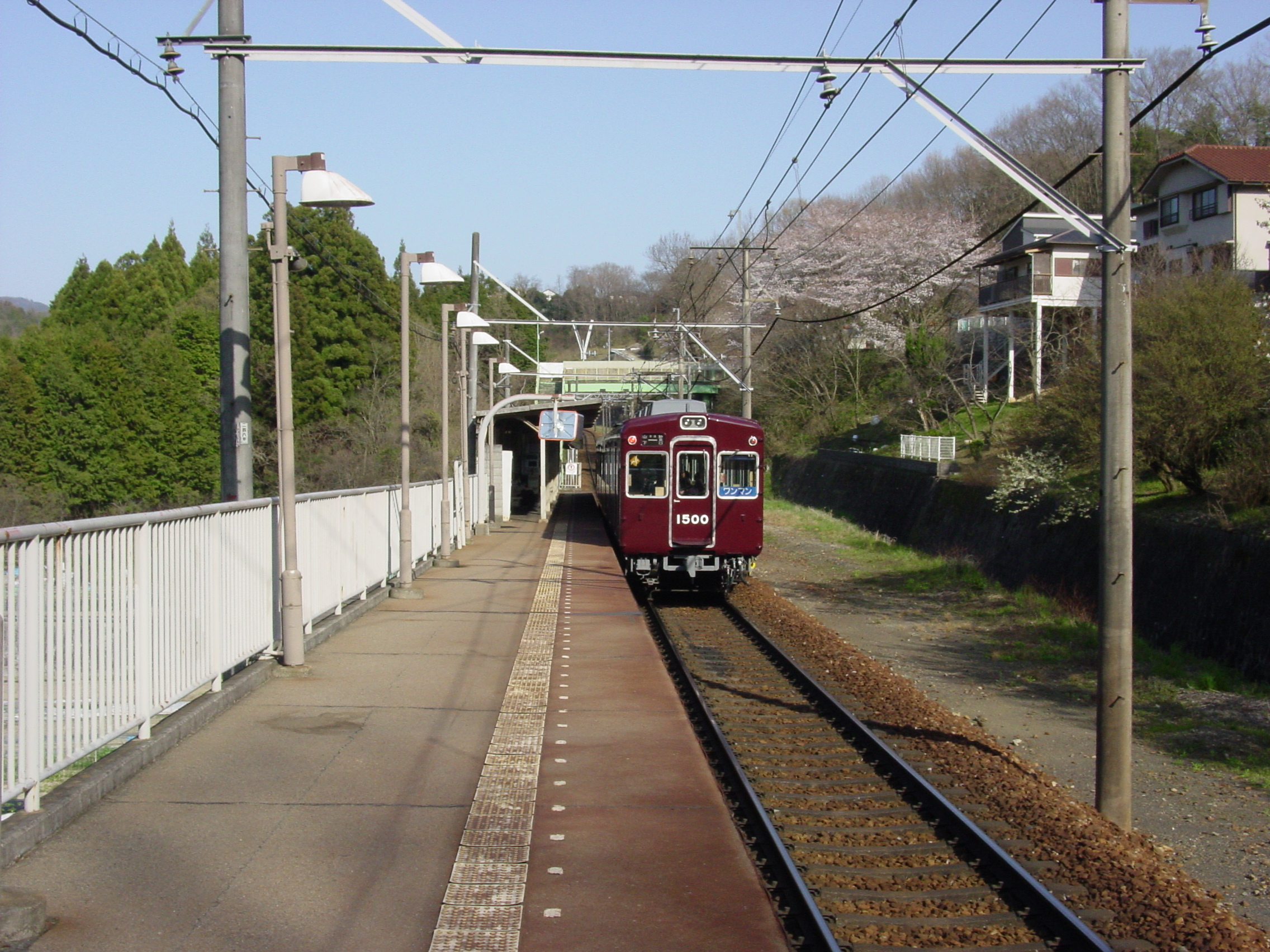
- Sasabe Station, April, 2010

General information
- Location: 277-2 Kawahara, Sasabe, Kawanishi-shi, Hyōgo-ken 666-0104; Japan
- Coordinates: 34°53′37.59″N 135°24′58.58″E
- Operator: Nose Electric Railway
- Line: ■ Myōken Line
- Distance: 8.5 km (5.3 miles) from Kawanishi-Noseguchi
- Platforms: 1 side platform

Other information
- Status: Unstaffed
- Station code: NS11
- Website: Official website

History
- Opened: 3 November 1923; 102 years ago

Passengers
- FY2019: 109 daily
Location
- Location within Hyōgo Prefecture Location within Japan

Sasabe Station (笹部駅, Sasabe-eki) is a passenger railway station located in the city of Kawanishi, Hyōgo Prefecture, Japan. It is operated by the private transportation company Nose Electric Railway.

== Lines ==
Sasabe Station is served by the Myōken Line, and is located 8.5 kilometers (5.3 mi) from the terminus of the line at Kawanishi-Noseguchi.

== Station layout ==
The station consists of one ground-level side platform serving a single bi-directional track. The effective length of the platform is for 4-car trains. The station is unattended.

== Adjacent stations ==
«	Service	»
Nose Railway Myōken Line
Yamashita	Myoken Express	Kōfūdai
Yamashita	Local	Kōfūdai

== History ==
Sasabe Station opened on 3 November 1923.

== Passenger statistics ==
In fiscal 2019, the station was used by an average of 109 passengers daily

== Surrounding area ==
- Yamato Housing Complex (Hankyu Kita Neopolis)

== See also ==
- List of railway stations in Japan
