= Hankyu 5100 series =

Japanese train type

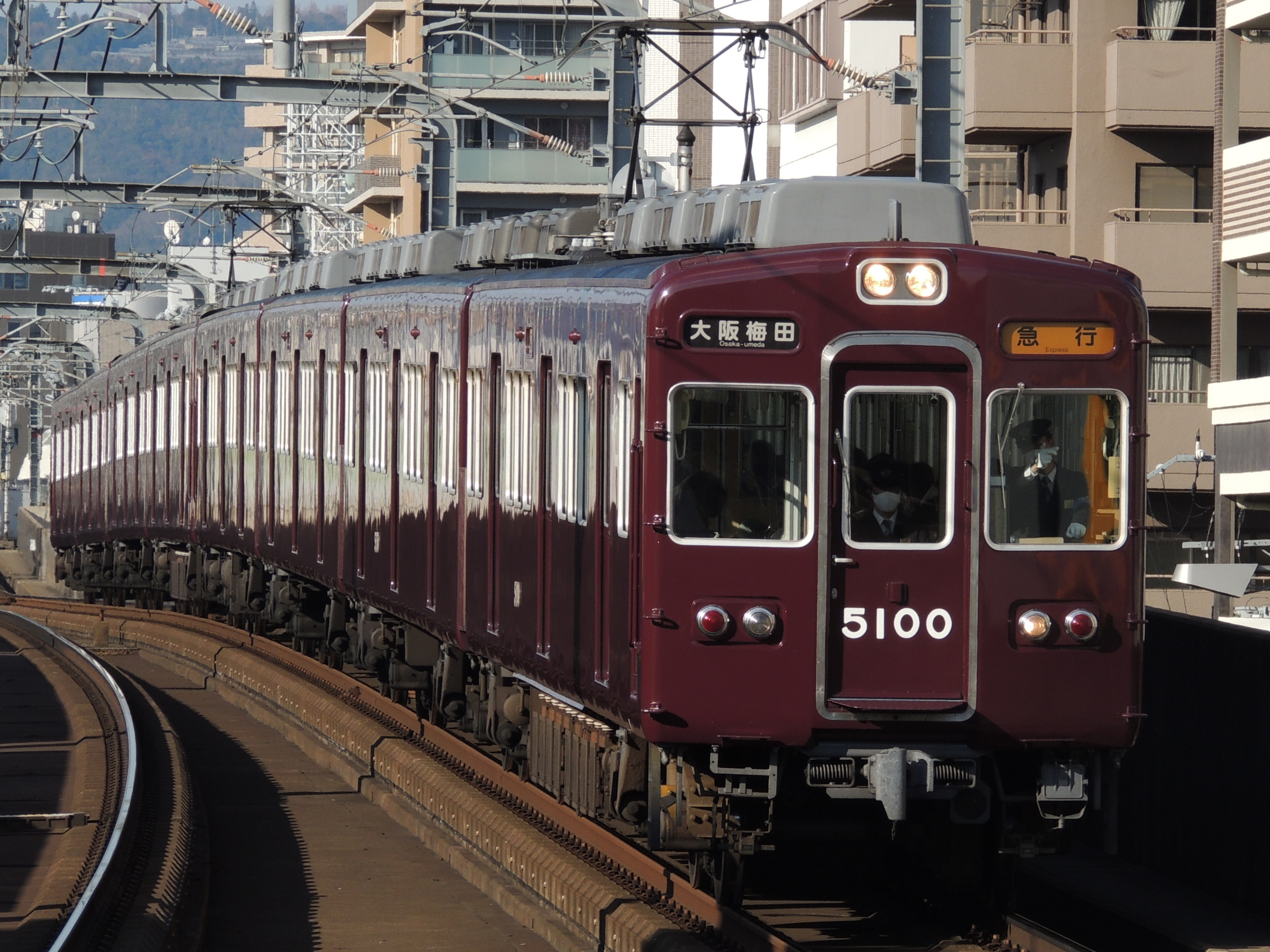
- Set 5100 in 2021
- In service: 1971–present
- Manufacturer: Alna Kōki
- Constructed: 1971–1979
- Number built: 90 vehicles
- Number in service: 32 vehicles (5 sets) (Hankyu Railway); 24 vehicles (7 sets) (Nose Electric Railway) (as of 1 April 2024)
- Formation: 2/4/6/8 cars per trainset
- Operators: Hankyu Railway, Nose Electric Railway
- Lines served: Hankyu Takarazuka Main Line; Hankyu Minoo Line; Nose Railway Myōken Line Nose Railway Nissei Line; Formerly: Hankyu Kobe Main Line; Hankyu Imazu Line; Hankyu Itami Line; Hankyu Kyoto Main Line

Specifications
- Car length: 19,000 mm (62 ft 4 in)
- Width: 2,750 mm (9 ft 0 in)
- Height: 4,095 mm (13 ft 5.2 in)
- Doors: 3 pairs per side
- Electric system(s): 1,500 V DC overhead catenary
- Current collection: Pantograph
- Track gauge: 1,435 mm (4 ft 8 1/2 in)

The Hankyu 5100 series (阪急電鉄5100系) is an electric multiple unit (EMU) train type operated in Japan by the private railway operator Hankyu since 1971.

== Operations ==
Eight-car sets are currently operated on the Takarazuka Line while four-car sets are operated on the Minoo Line. 5100 series trainsets were also formerly operated on various lines in the network, including the Kobe Main Line, Kyoto Main Line, Imazu Line and Itami Line.

== Formations ==
As of 1 April 2024, the fleet consists of three eight-car sets (5104, 5106 and 5128) and two four-car sets (5132 and 5134). They are formed as follows.

=== 8-car sets ===
| Car No. | 1 | 2 | 3 | 4 | 5 | 6 | 7 | 8 |
|---|---|---|---|---|---|---|---|---|
| Designation | Mc | T | T | M'c | Mc | M'c | Mc | M'c |
| Numbering | 5100 | 5650 | 5650 | 5100 | 5100 | 5100 | 5100 | 5100 |
| Designation | Mc | T | T | M'c | Mc | T | T | M'c |
| Numbering | 5100 | 5650 | 5650 | 5100 | 5100 | 5650 | 5650 | 5100 |

=== 4-car sets ===
| Car No. | 1 | 2 | 3 | 4 |
|---|---|---|---|---|
| Designation | Mc | T | T | M'c |
| Numbering | 5100 | 5650 | 5650 | 5100 |

== History ==
The 5100 series was introduced across all three of Hankyu Railway's trunk lines in 1971. By 1979, 90 vehicles were built by Alna Kōki. In addition, the 5100 series was the first mass-produced train type to feature air-conditioning from new.

With the commencement of the refurbishment of the 5000 series in 2001, 17 intermediate cars were transferred to the 5000 series fleet from 2001 to 2007.

As of 2011, only three sets (5128, 5136 and 5146) underwent refurbishment work.

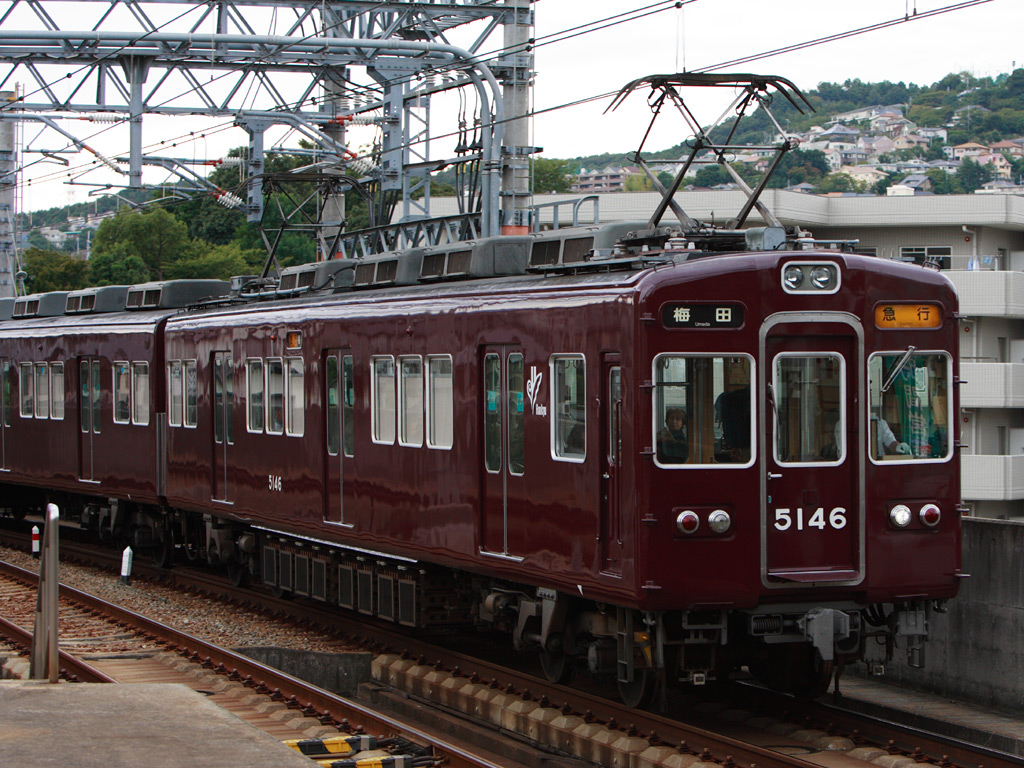
A refurbished 5100 series set in 2009

== Noseden 5100 series ==
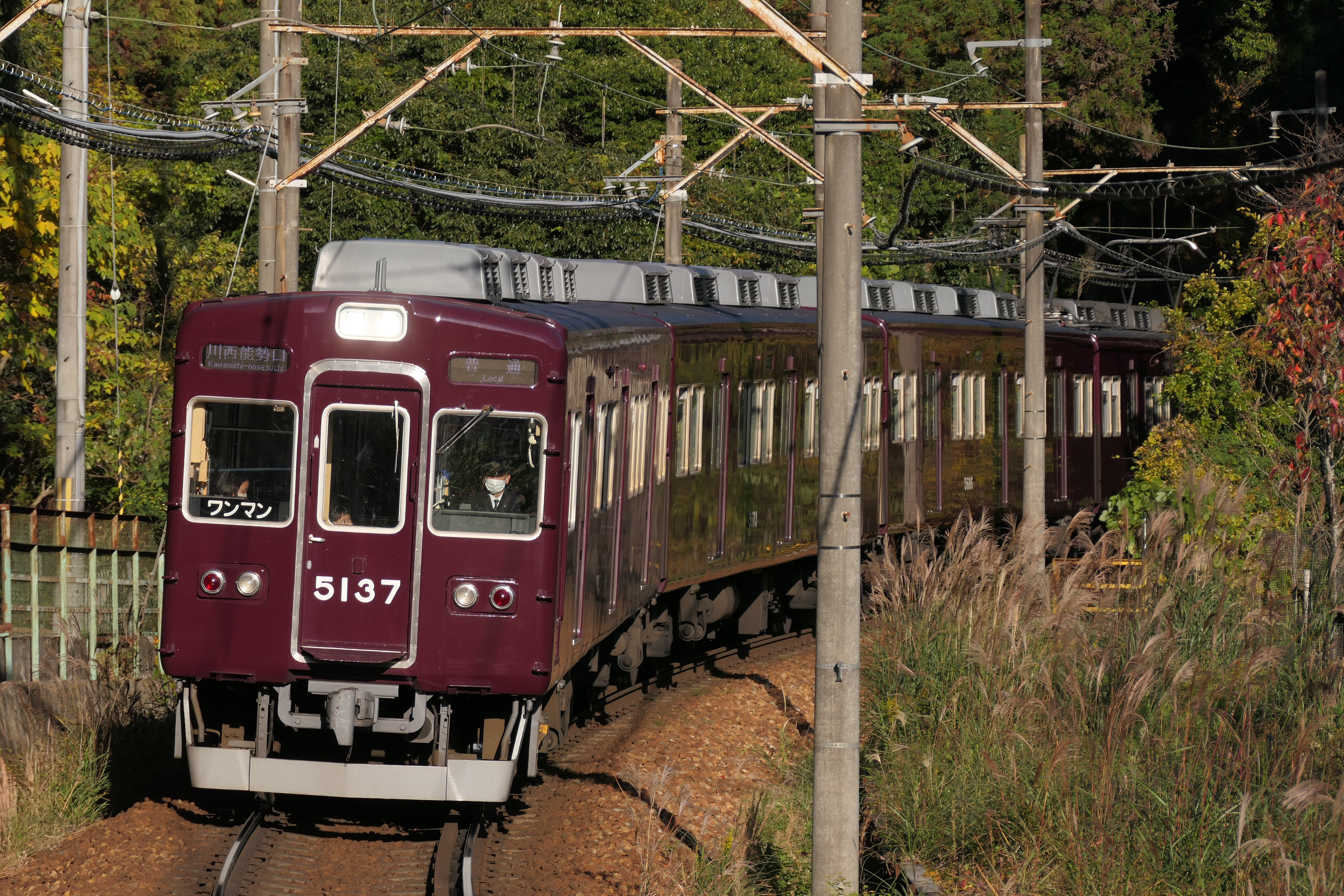
A Noseden 5100 series set in November 2020

24 Hankyu 5100 series cars were transferred to the subsidiary railway company Nose Electric Railway from 2014 to 2016 for use on its network from 16 March 2015 to replace its ageing 1500 series fleet. The first set to be transferred to Nose Electric Railway, 5136, was sent to Amagasaki Station on the Hanshin Main Line for modification work in July 2014. The set was later split up as 4-car sets 5136 and 5138. Set 5136 was subsequently transported to Noseden's Hirano Depot in January 2015, followed by set 5138 in February of the same year. They first entered service with the railway operator on 16 March 2015.

=== Special liveries ===
Upon entering service with Nose Electric Railway, two-car sets 5124 and 5142 received special liveries. Set 5124 received an all-over blue and cream livery, reminiscent of the livery used by 50 series trains. Set 5142 received an all-over maroon and beige livery, reminiscent of the original 1500 series livery. Both sets were repainted back into the standard colour scheme of all-over maroon in 2023.

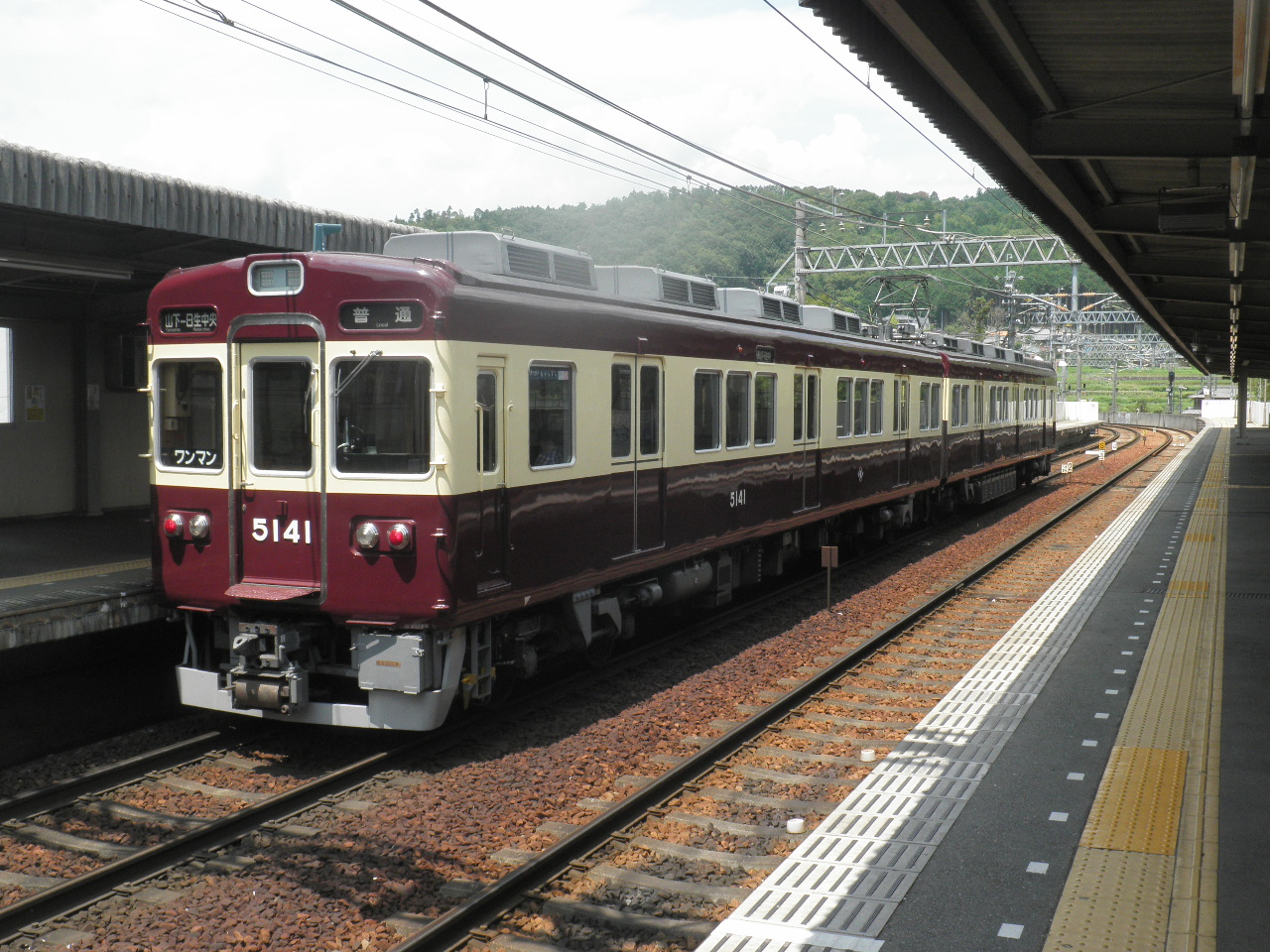
Set 5142 in 2016

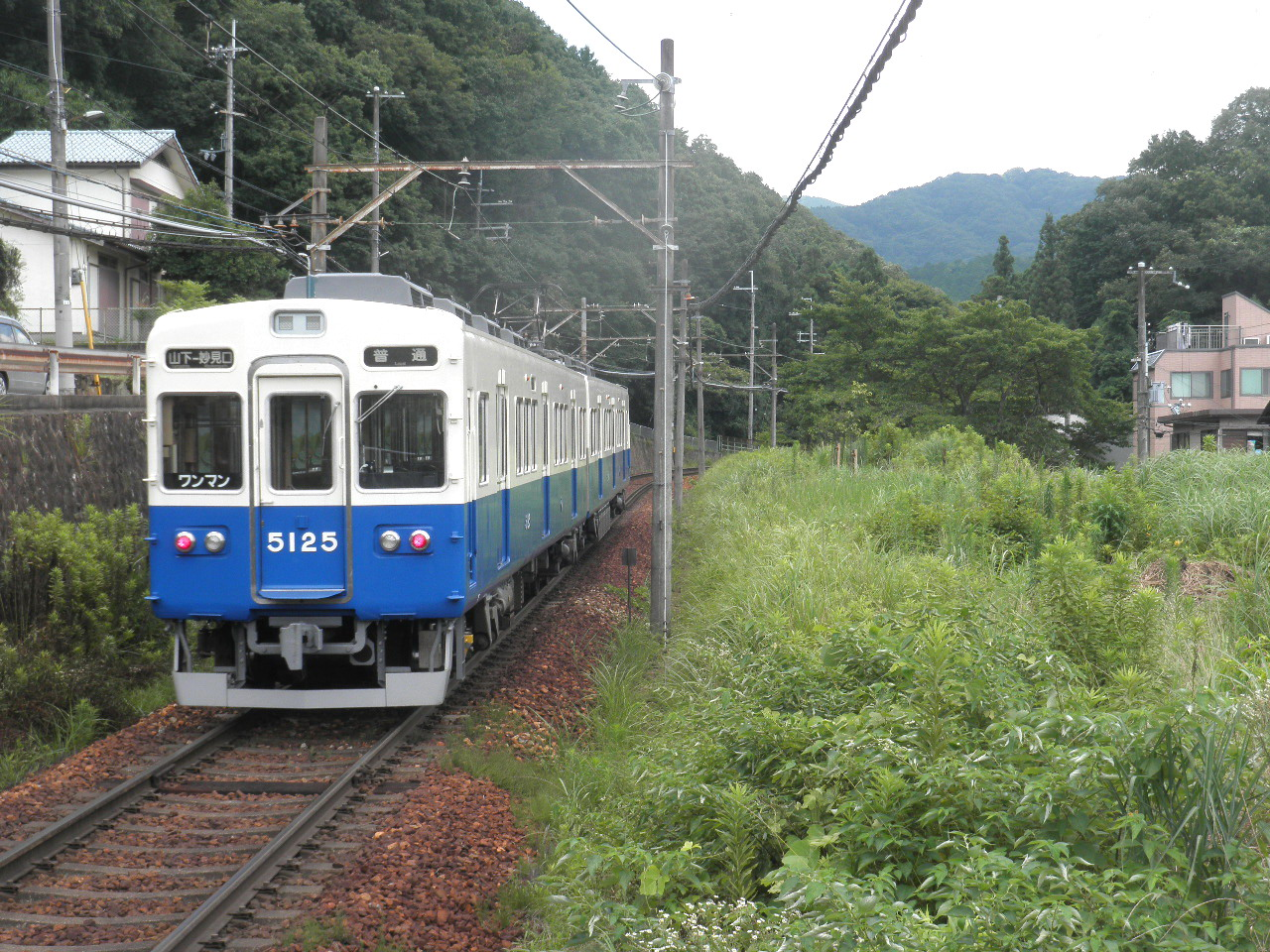
Set 5124 in 2016

=== Interior ===
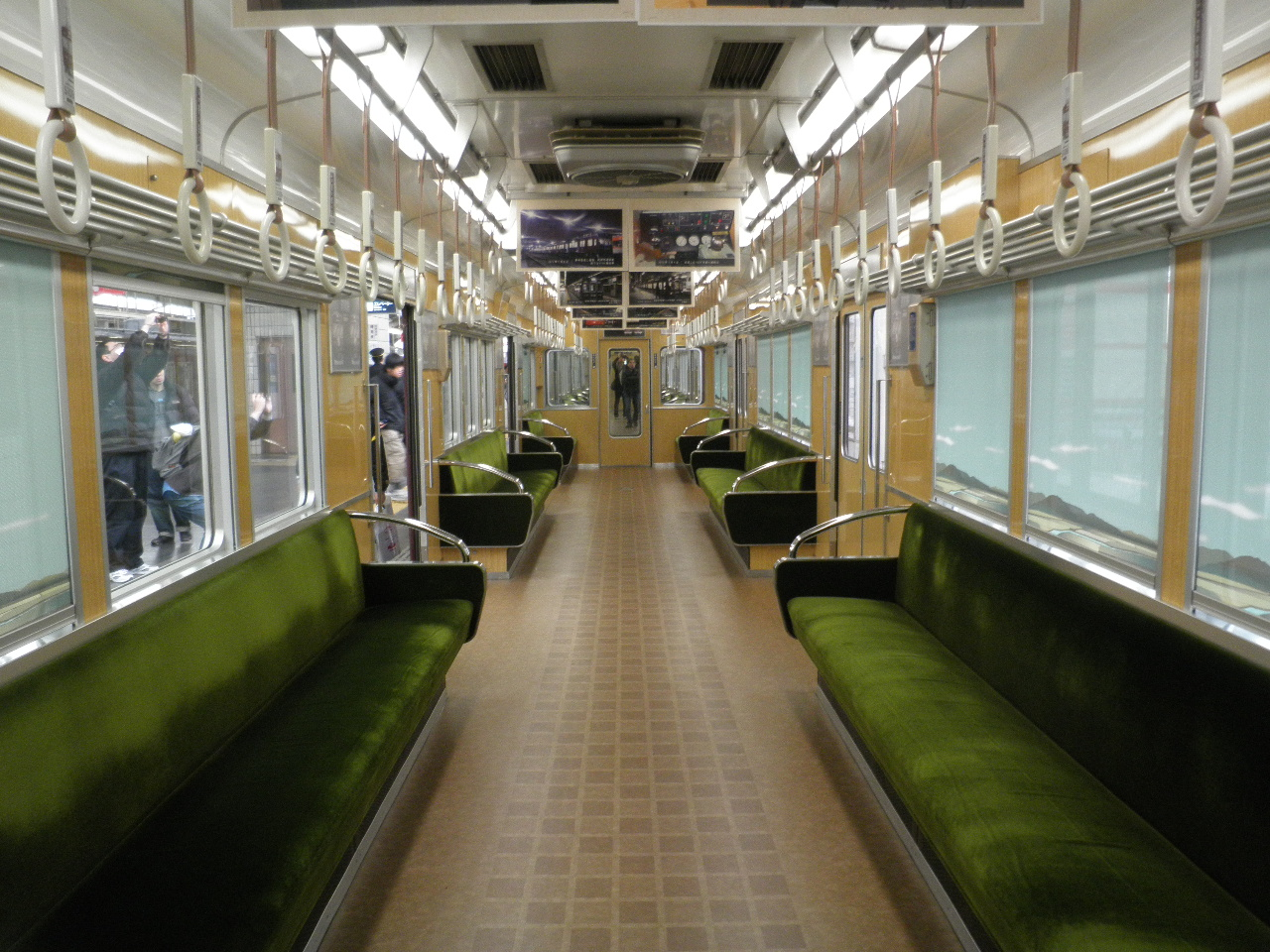
Interior of a four-car set

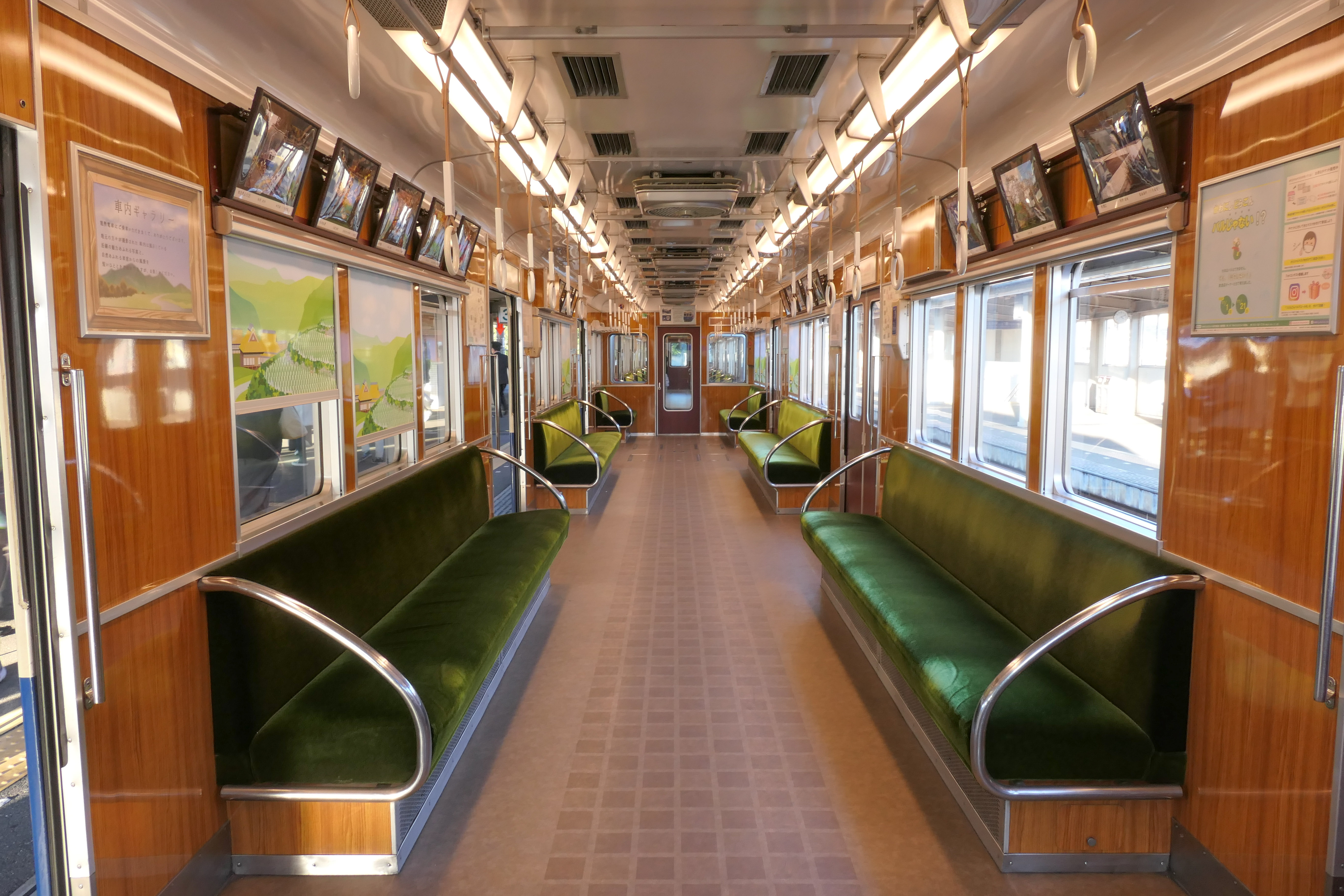
Interior of a two-car set

=== Fleet details ===
==== 4-car sets ====
| Set No. | Entered service |
|---|---|
| 5108 | June 2016 |
| 5136 | 16 March 2015 |
| 5138 | 16 March 2015 |
| 5146 | 18 January 2016 |
| 5148 | 25 January 2016 |

==== 2-car sets ====
| Set No. | Entered service | Notes |
|---|---|---|
| 5124 | 23 June 2016 | Formerly repainted in two-tone blue and cream livery |
| 5142 | 16 June 2016 | Formerly repainted in two-tone maroon and beige livery |

== Gallery ==
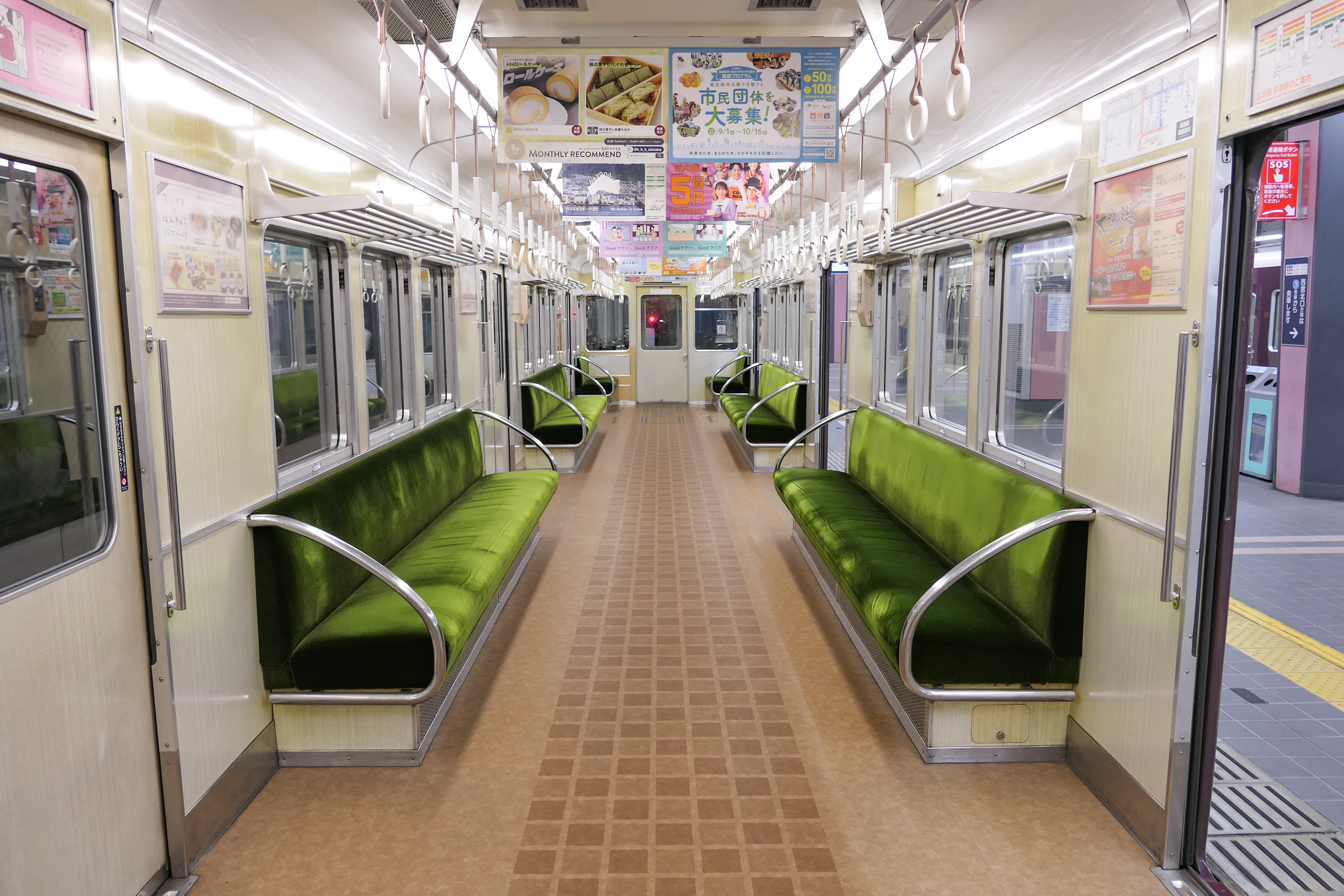
Interior view of a 5100 series set in original condition

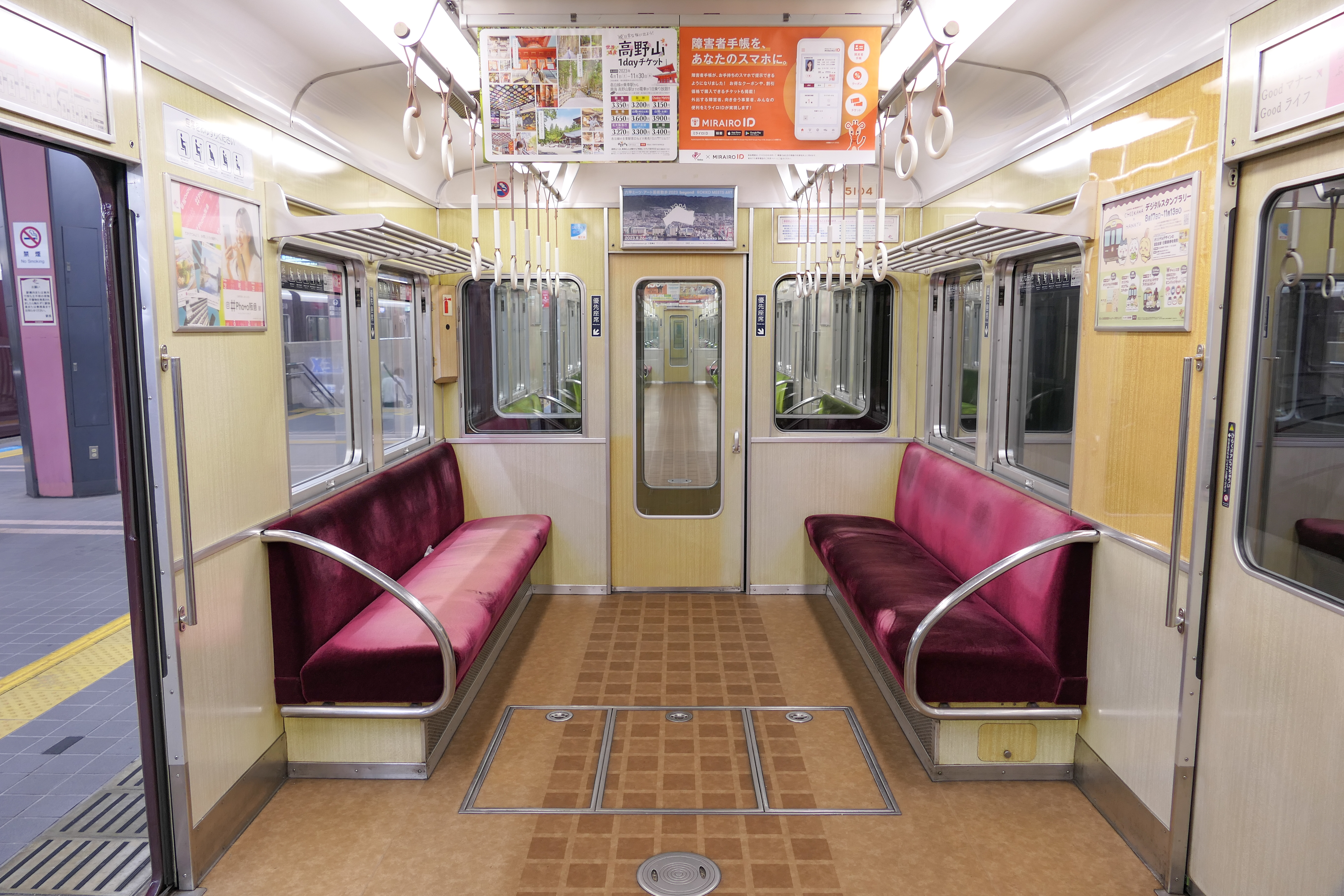
Priority seating of a 5100 series set in original condition

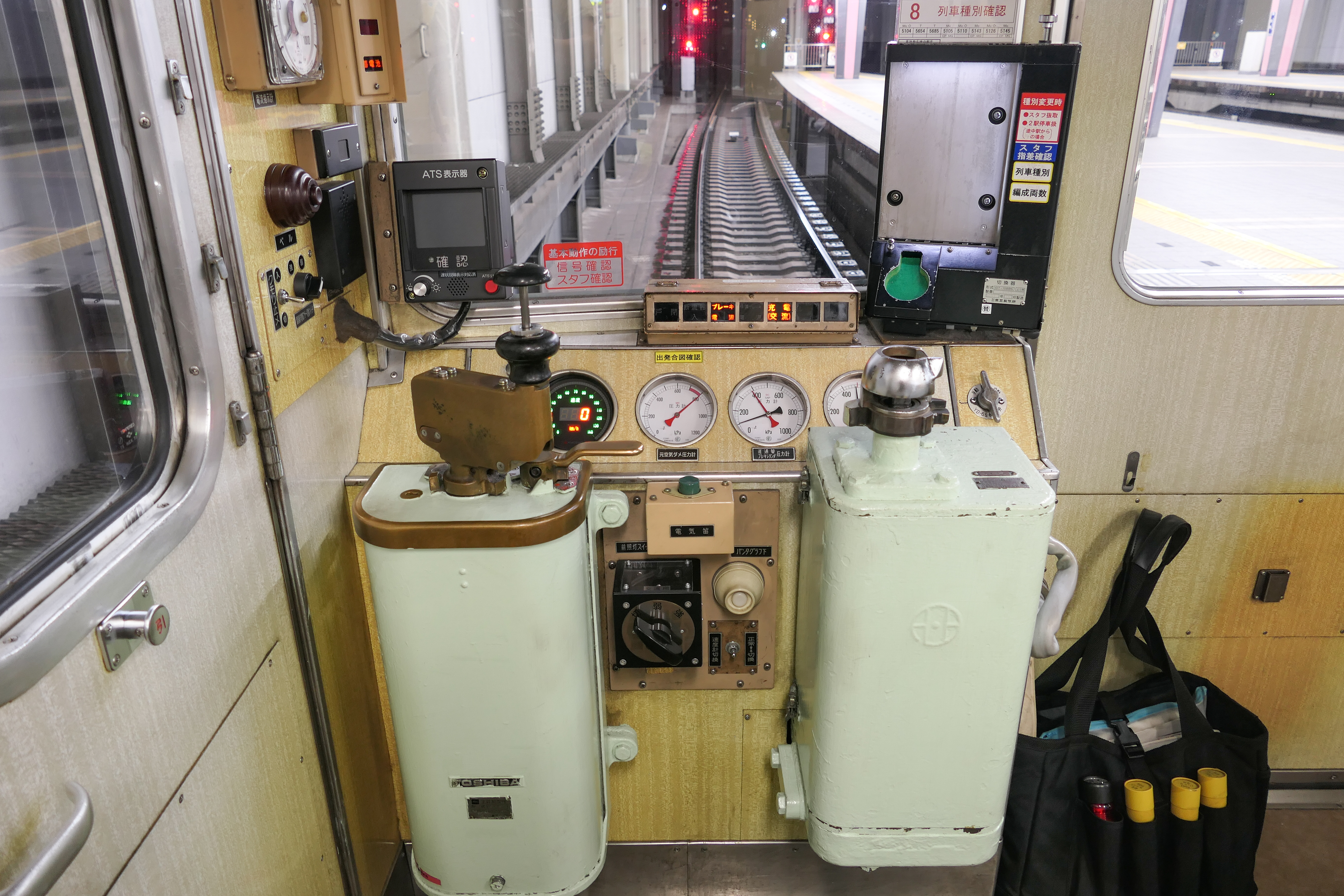
Driver's cab
