= Nose Electric Railway =

Railway in Japan

Nose Electric Railway Co., Ltd.
- Native name: 能勢電鉄株式会社
- Founded: 23 May 1908
- Headquarters: Kawanishi, Hyogo, Japan
- Parent: Hankyu Corporation
- Website: noseden.hankyu.co.jp

Nose Electric Railway Co., Ltd. (能勢電鉄株式会社, Nose Dentetsu; pronounced NO-SAY), abbreviated as Nose Railway or Noseden (能勢電), is a Japanese private railway company. Its lines run in the mountainous areas of the Hanshin region, linking the Toyono District of Osaka to Kawanishi, Hyōgo.

Nose Electric Railway is a principal subsidiary of Hankyu Corporation. Through service is provided with the Hankyu Takarazuka Line. A rush-hour special express train, the Nissei Limited Express, operates from Nissei-chuo Station to Umeda Station, the terminal of Hankyu in Osaka, in the morning and back again in the evening for commuters.

== Lines and stations ==
Hankyu's railway network, with Nose Railway lines in red

Nose Railway has two lines:

- Myōken Line (Kawanishi-noseguchi – Myōkenguchi)
- Nissei Line (Yamashita – Nissei-chuo)

The former is the main route; the latter branches off at Yamashita Station.

In addition to the railway, Nose Railway formerly operated a funicular (Myoken Cable) and a chairlift (Myoken Lift) until 2023.

== Operations ==
- S: Trains stop; |, ↑: Trains pass; ↑: Only one direction
- Local (普通, Futsū) trains are operated all day every day
- Limited Express (特急日生エクスプレス, Tokkyū Nissei Express) trains run from Nissei Chūō to Osaka-umeda in the morning, and vice versa in the evening on weekdays.

No.	Station	Japanese	Distance (km)	Local	Limited Express	Connections	Location	
Myoken Line
	Through section				Osaka-umeda (Hankyu)			
NS01	Kawanishi-noseguchi	川西能勢口	0.0	S	S	Hankyu Takarazuka Line	Kawanishi	Hyōgo Prefecture
NS02	Kinunobebashi	絹延橋	1.2	S	|		Kawanishi	Hyōgo Prefecture
NS03	Takiyama	滝山	2.1	S	|		Kawanishi	Hyōgo Prefecture
NS04	Uguisunomori	鶯の森	2.7	S	|		Kawanishi	Hyōgo Prefecture
NS05	Tsuzumigataki	鼓滝	3.5	S	|		Kawanishi	Hyōgo Prefecture
NS06	Tada	多田	4.2	S	|		Kawanishi	Hyōgo Prefecture
NS07	Hirano	平野	5.2	S	S		Kawanishi	Hyōgo Prefecture
NS08	Ichinotorii	一の鳥居	6.4	S	|		Kawanishi	Hyōgo Prefecture
NS09	Uneno	畦野	7.1	S	S		Kawanishi	Hyōgo Prefecture
NS10	Yamashita	山下	8.2	S	S	Nissei Line	Kawanishi	Hyōgo Prefecture
NS11	Sasabe	笹部	8.6	S	Nissei Line		Kawanishi	Hyōgo Prefecture
NS12	Kōfūdai	光風台	10.3	S	Nissei Line		Toyono, Toyono District	Osaka Prefecture
NS13	Tokiwadai	ときわ台	11.2	S	Nissei Line		Toyono, Toyono District	Osaka Prefecture
NS14	Myōkenguchi	妙見口	12.2	S	Nissei Line		Toyono, Toyono District	Osaka Prefecture
Nissei Line
NS21	Nissei-chuo	日生中央	2.6 (from Yamashita)	S	S		Inagawa, Kawabe District	Hyōgo Prefecture

== Myoken no Mori Cable and Myoken no Mori Lift ==
Myoken Cable (a funicular/cable car) and Myoken Lift (a chairlift) were formerly located approximately 1.4 km (0.87 mi) north of Myōkenguchi Station. They provided access to Myoken-do Temple. After 63 years of operation, both closed on December 4, 2023, due to decreasing ridership and ageing equipment.

Station	Japanese	Connections	Location
Myoken no Mori Cable (Funicular)
Kurokawa	黒川	Myoken Line (Myōkenguchi Station) via walking or bus	Kawanishi, Hyōgo
Cable Sanjō	ケーブル山上	Myoken no Mori Lift via walk	Kawanishi, Hyōgo
Myōken no Mori Lift (Chairlift)
Myōken-no-mizu Hiroba-mae	妙見の水広場前	Myoken no Mori Cable via walking	Kawanishi, Hyōgo
Myōkensan	妙見山		Kawanishi, Hyōgo

== Rolling stock ==
Nose Railway uses second-hand EMUs from Hankyu. The trains operate on 1,435 mm (4 ft 8 1/2 in) track.

As of 29 August 2026, the fleet operated is as follows.

- 1700 series 4-car EMU x 1 (former Hankyu 2000 series, transferred 1990-1992. Originally 8 sets, only 1 still in service)
- 5100 series 4-car EMU x 5 and 2-car EMU x 2 (former Hankyu 5100 series, transferred 2014-2016)
- 6000 series 8-car EMU x 1 (former Hankyu 6000 series, transferred in August 2014)
- 7200 series 4-car EMU x 3 and 2-car EMU x 2 (former Hankyu 6000 and Hankyu 7000 series, transferred 2017-2025)

The 6000 series EMU is used interchangeably with the Hankyu Takarazuka line fleet, and Takarazuka line 8-car EMU trains are also used for Limited Express services on the Nose Railway.

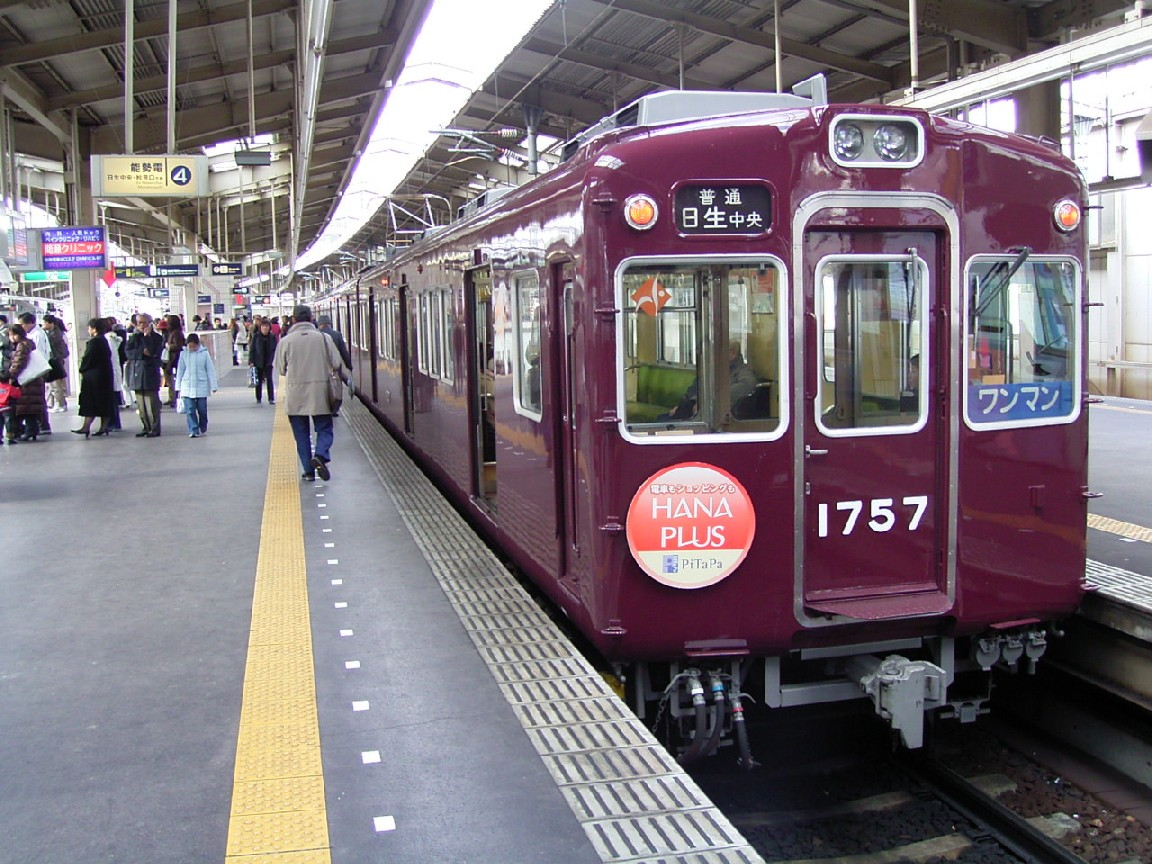
Nose Electric Railway 1700 series train

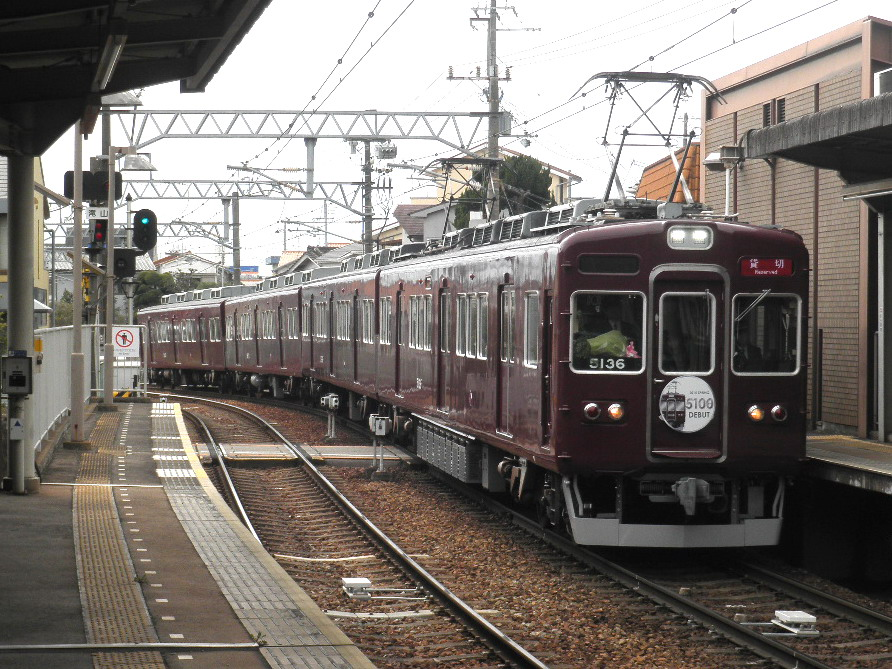
Nose Electric Railway 5100 series train

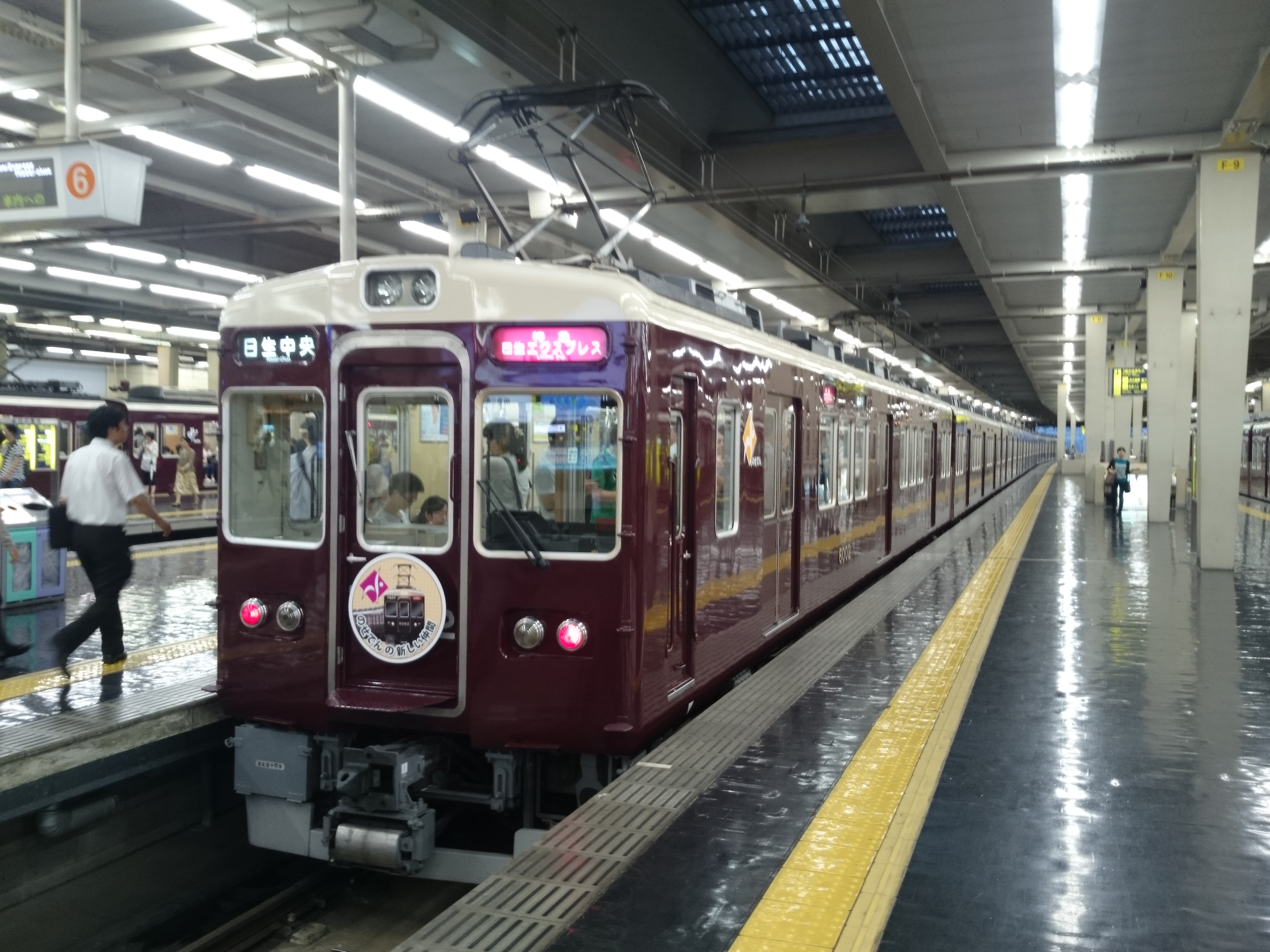
Nose Electric Railway 6000 series train

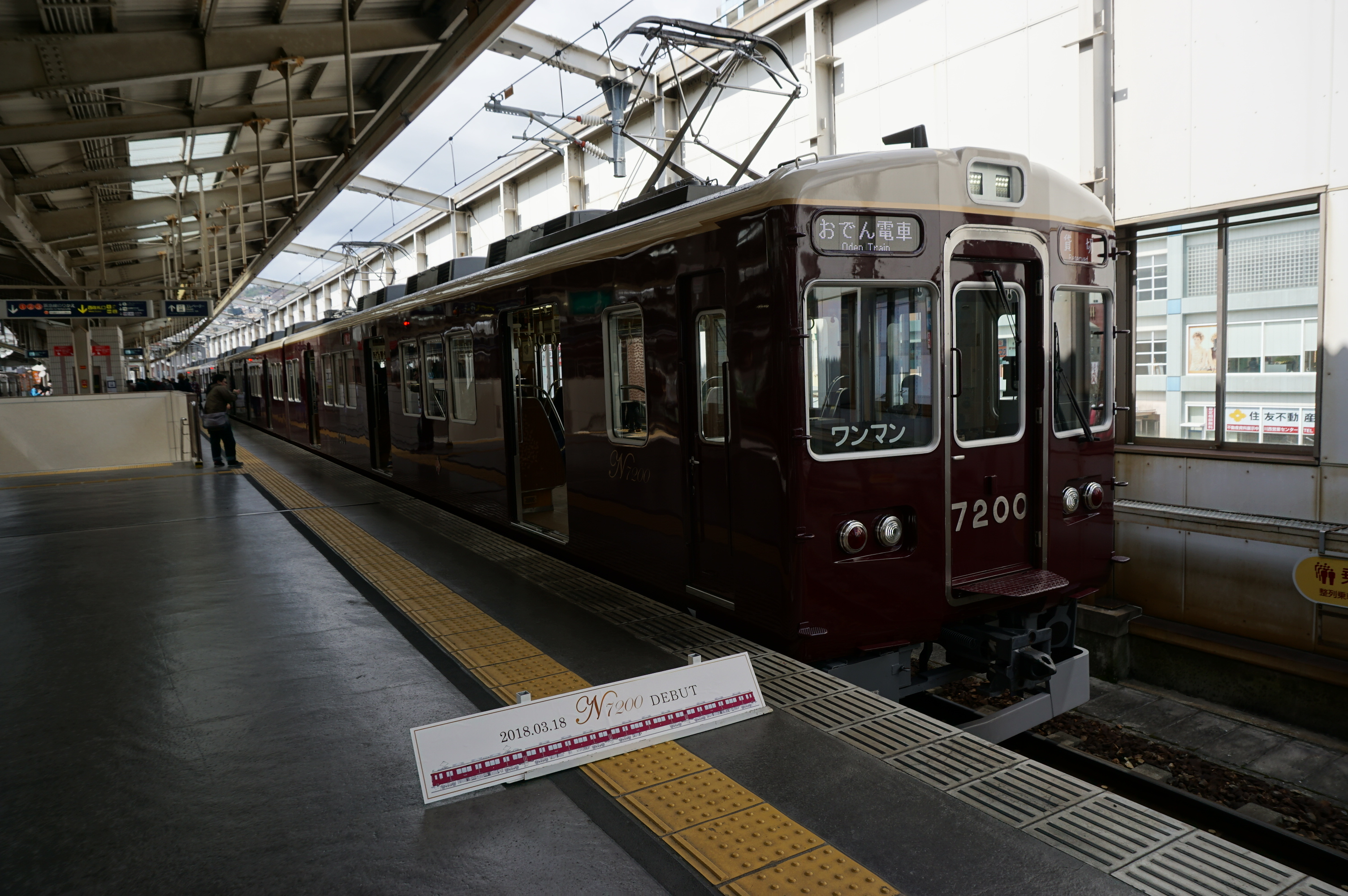
Nose Electric Railway 7200 series train

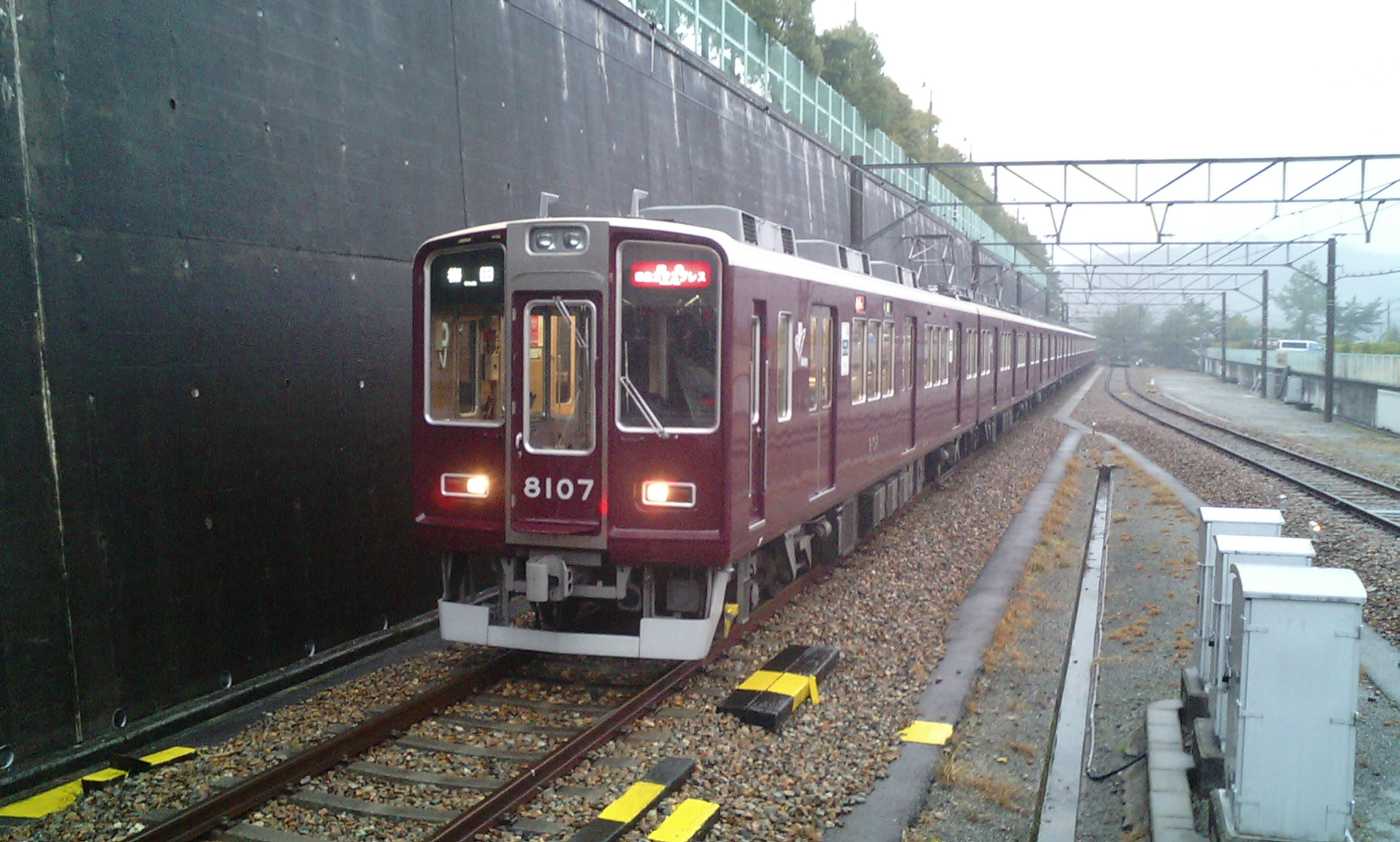
Hankyu 8000 series on a Limited Express service

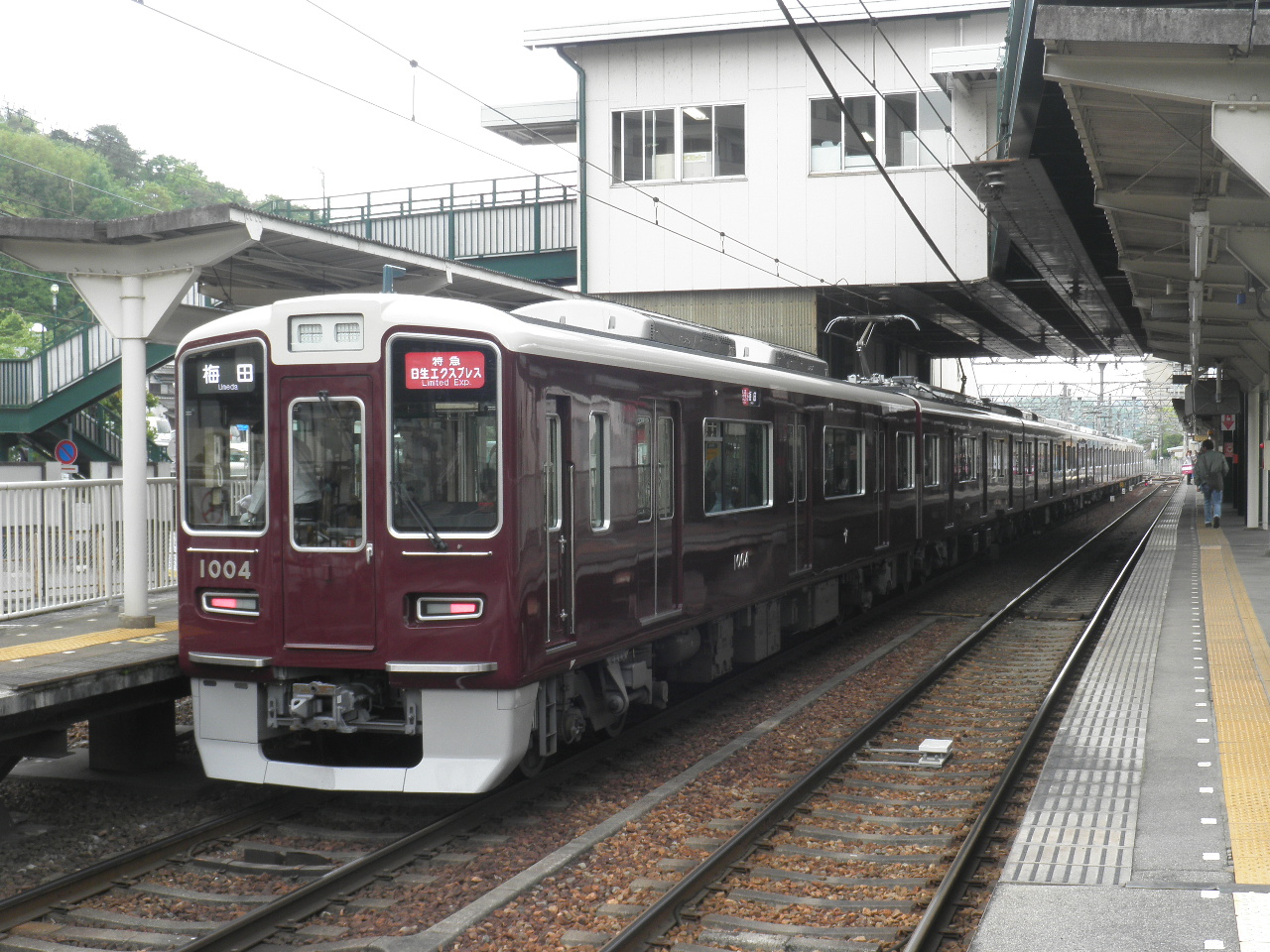
Hankyu 1000 series on a Limited Express service

=== Former rolling stock ===
- 1500 series EMU (former Hankyu 2100 series, 1983-2016)
- 1000 series EMU (former Hankyu 1010 and 1100 series, 1986-2001)
- 3100 series 4-car EMU (former Hankyu 3100 series, 1997-2021)
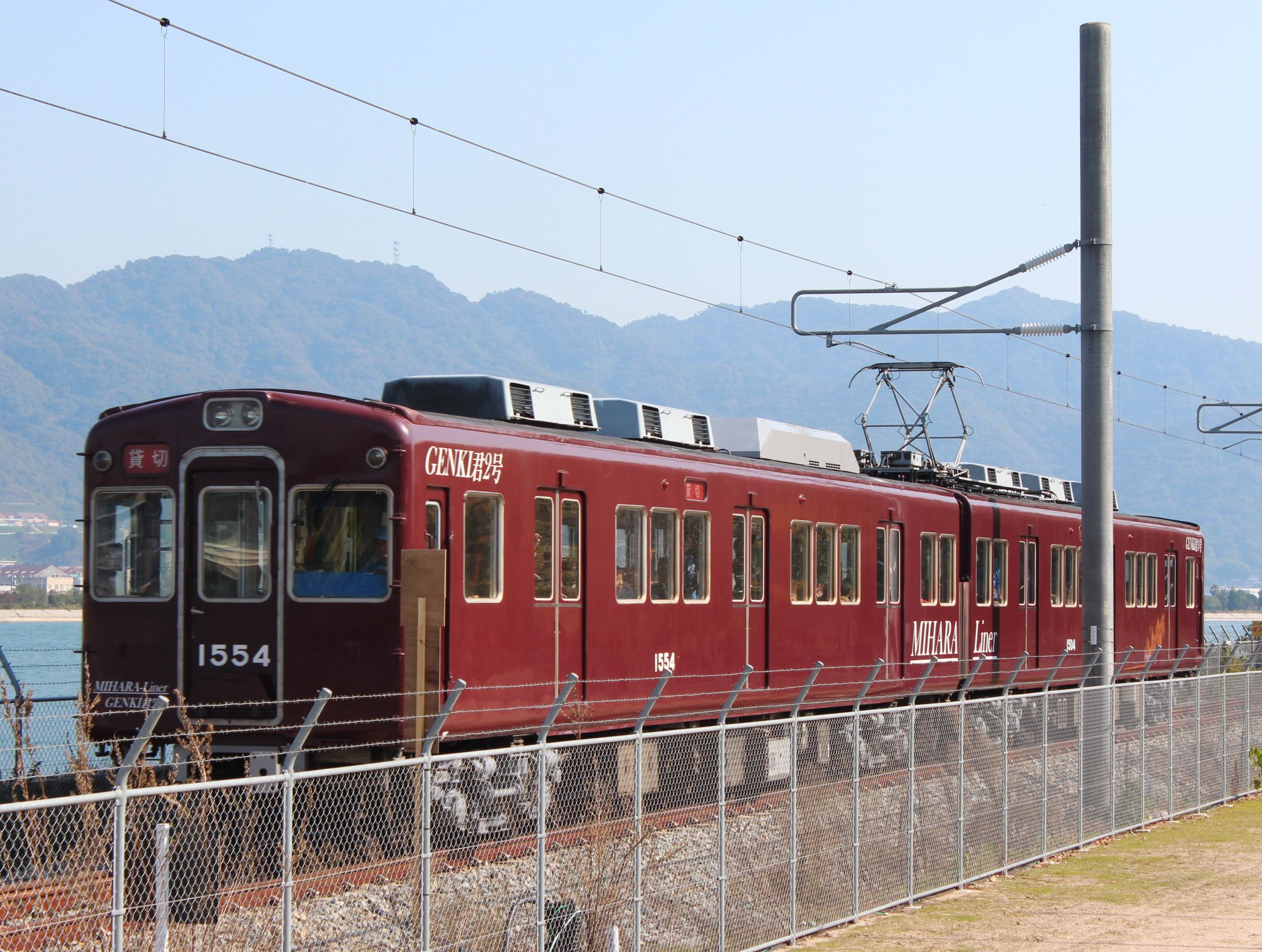
An ex-Nose Electric Railway 1500 series converted to a "MIHARA-Liner" test train at Mitsubishi Heavy Industries's test track at Mihara

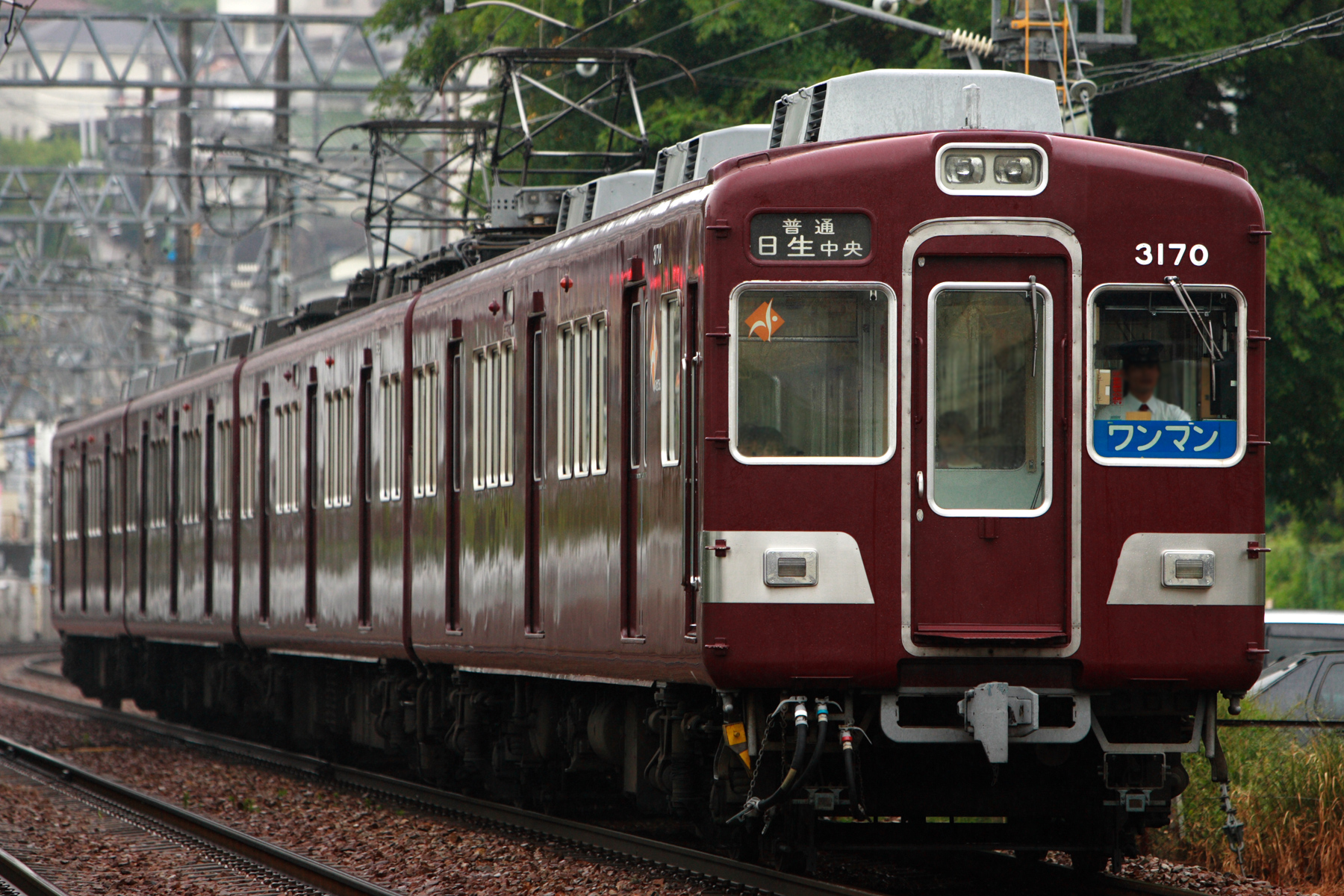
Nose Electric Railway 3100 series train

== History ==
Nose Electric Railway was founded on 23 May 1908. The Kawanishi-noseguchi to Ichinotorii section opened on 13 April 1913, electrified at 600 V DC. The extension to Myōkenguchi was opened on 3 November 1923.

The line's voltage was increased from 600 V to 1,500 V DC on 26 March 1995.

== See also ==
- List of railway lines in Japan
