= Ichinotorii Station =

Railway station in Kawanishi, Hyōgo Prefecture, Japan

Ichinotorii Station 一の鳥居駅
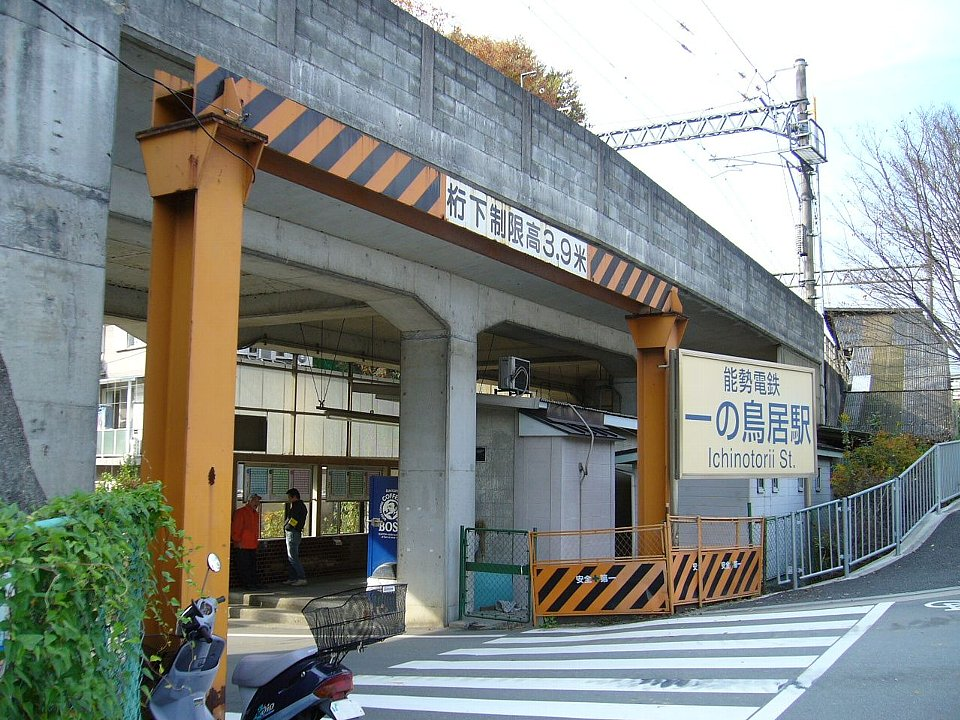
- Ichinotorii Station, April 2010

General information
- Location: 1-chōme-11 Higashiunenoyamate, Kawanishi-shi, Hyōgo-ken 666-0114; Japan
- Coordinates: 34°52′45.6″N 135°25′12.24″E
- Operator: Nose Electric Railway
- Line: ■ Myōken Line
- Distance: 6.4 km (4.0 miles) from Kawanishi-Noseguchi
- Platforms: 2 side platforms

Other information
- Status: Unstaffed
- Station code: NS08
- Website: Official website

History
- Opened: 13 April 1913; 113 years ago

Passengers
- FY2019: 805 daily
Location
- Location within Hyōgo Prefecture Location within Japan

Ichinotorii Station (一の鳥居駅, Ichinotorii--eki) is a passenger railway station located in the city of Kawanishi, Hyōgo Prefecture, Japan. It is operated by the private transportation company Nose Electric Railway.

== Lines ==
Ichinotorii Station is served by the Myōken Line, and is located 6.4 kilometers (4.0 mi) from the terminus of the line at Kawanishi-Noseguchi.

== Station layout ==
The station consists of two opposed side platforms, connected by an underground passage. Only stairs are installed from the ticket gate to the platform, and there is no elevator, and the station is therefore not barrier-free. The effective length of both platforms is for six cars, but normally only 3-car or 4-car trains are used. The 8-car limited express Hinase Express does not stop at this station.

== Adjacent stations ==
| « | Service | » |
Nose Railway Myōken Line
Limited Express: Does not stop at this station
Nissei Express: Does not stop at this station
Myoken Express: Does not stop at this station
| Hirano | Local | Uneno |

== History ==
Ichinotorii Station opened on 13 April 1913.

== Passenger statistics ==
In fiscal 2019, the station was used by an average of 805 passengers daily

== Surrounding area ==
- Japan National Route 173

== See also ==
- List of railway stations in Japan
