= Kōfūdai Station (Osaka) =

Railway station in Toyono, Osaka Prefecture, Japan

Kōfūdai Station 光風台駅
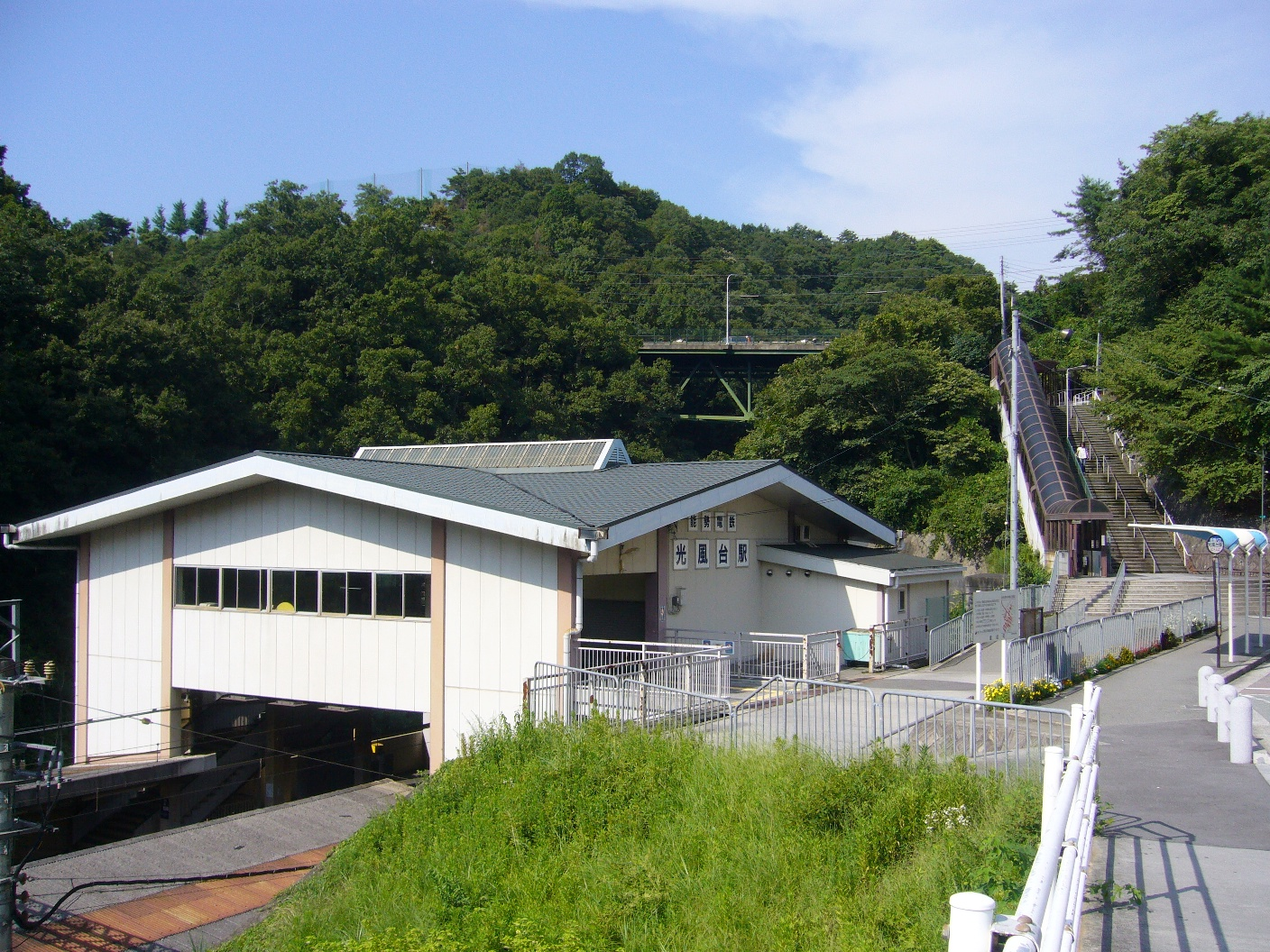
- Kōfūdai Station, September 2007

General information
- Location: 3 Chōme Kōfūdai, Toyono-chō, Toyono-gun, Osaka-fu 563-0104; Japan
- Coordinates: 34°54′0.4″N 135°25′54.1″E
- Operator: Nose Electric Railway
- Line: ■ Myōken Line
- Distance: 10.3 km (6.4 miles) from Kawanishi-Noseguchi
- Platforms: 2 side platforms

Other information
- Status: Unstaffed
- Station code: NS12
- Website: Official website

History
- Opened: 16 October 1978; 47 years ago

Passengers
- FY2019: 3,459 daily
Location
- Location within Osaka Prefecture Location within Japan

Kōfūdai Station (光風台駅, Kōfūdai-eki) is a passenger railway station located in the town of Toyono, Toyono District, Osaka Prefecture, Japan. It is operated by the private transportation company Nose Electric Railway.

== Lines ==
Kōfūdai Station is served by the Myōken Line, and is located 10.3 kilometers (6.4 mi) from the terminus of the line at Kawanishi-Noseguchi.

== Station layout ==
The station consists of two opposed side platforms connected by an elevated station building. The station is located in a valley, and there are escalators to ground-level. The station is unattended.

== Adjacent stations ==
«	Service	»
Nose Railway Myōken Line
Sasabe	Myoken Express	Tokiwadai
Sasabe	Loca	Tokiwadai

== History ==
Kōfūdai Station opened on 16 October 1978.

== Passenger statistics ==
In fiscal 2019, the station was used by an average of 3,459 passengers daily

== Surrounding area ==
- Toyono Municipal Kofudai Elementary School

== See also ==
- List of railway stations in Japan
