= Yamashita Station (Hyōgo) =

Railway station in Kawanishi, Hyōgo Prefecture, Japan

Yamashita Station 山下駅
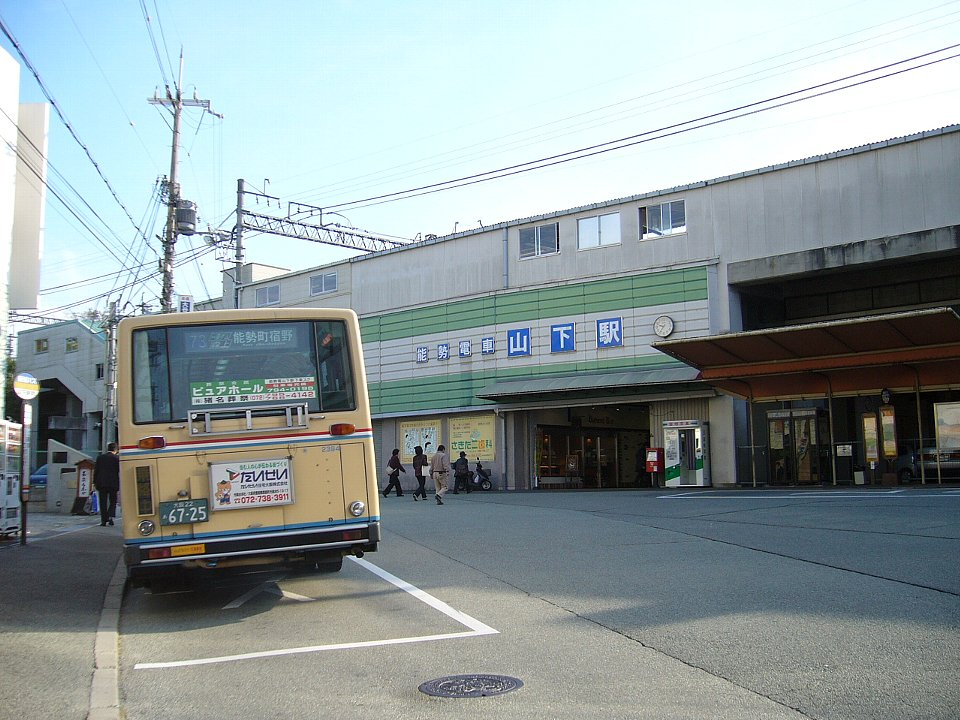
- Yamashita Station, December 2006

General information
- Location: 2-24 Mino, Kawanishi-shi, Hyōgo-ken 666-0105; Japan
- Coordinates: 34°53′35.58″N 135°24′45.32″E
- Operator: Nose Electric Railway
- Line: ■ Myōken Line ■ Nissei Line
- Distance: 8.2 km (5.1 miles) from Kawanishi-Noseguchi
- Platforms: 1 island + 2 side platforms

Other information
- Status: Unstaffed
- Station code: NS10
- Website: Official website

History
- Opened: 3 November 1923; 102 years ago

Passengers
- FY2019: 6,474 daily
Location
- Location within Hyōgo Prefecture Location within Japan

Yamashita Station (山下駅, Yamashita-eki) is a junction passenger railway station located in the city of Kawanishi, Hyōgo Prefecture, Japan. It is operated by the private transportation company Nose Electric Railway.

== Lines ==
Yamashita Station is served by the Myōken Line, and is located 8.2 kilometers (5.1 mi) from the terminus of the line at Kawanishi-Noseguchi. It is also the terminus of a 2.6-kilometer (1.6 mi) spur line to Nissei-chuo.

== Station layout ==
The station consists of one V-shaped central island platform with a side platform on both sides. The station has three floors, with ticket gates on the first floor, a transfer concourse on the second floor, and the island platform on the third floor. Elevators are installed on all platforms, but only the elevators on the center platforms of tracks 2 and 3 directly connect the ticket gates on the 1st floor, and passengers on the side platforms much change elevators or use the stairs.

=== Platforms ===
| 1 | ■ Nissei Line | to Nissei Chūō |
| 2 | ■ Nissei Line | from Nissei Chūō for Kawanishi-noseguchi returning to Nissei Chūō via Line 1 |
| 3 | ■ Myoken Line | for Myōkenguchi |
| 4 | ■ Myoken Line | from Myōkenguchi for Kawanishi-Noseguchi |

== Adjacent stations ==
| « | Service | » |
Nose Railway Myōken Line
| Uneno (NS09) | Myoken Express | Sasabe (NS11) |
| Uneno (NS09) | Local | Sasabe (NS11) |
Nose Railway Nissei Line
| Uneno (NS09) | Limited Express | Nissei Chūō (NS21) |
| Uneno (NS09) | Nissei Express | Nissei Chūō (NS21) |
| Uneno (NS09) | Local | Nissei Chūō (NS21) |

== History ==
Yamashita Station opened on 3 November 1923.

== Passenger statistics ==
In fiscal 2019, the station was used by an average of 6,474 passengers daily

== Surrounding area ==
- Kawanishi City Folk Museum
- Kawanishi City Azumaya Public Hall
- Kawanishi Municipal East Housing Complex
- Kawanishi Municipal Kawanishi Hospital

== See also ==
- List of railway stations in Japan
