= Nissei-chuo Station =

Railway station in Inagawa, Hyōgo Prefecture, Japan

Nissei-chuo Station 日生中央駅
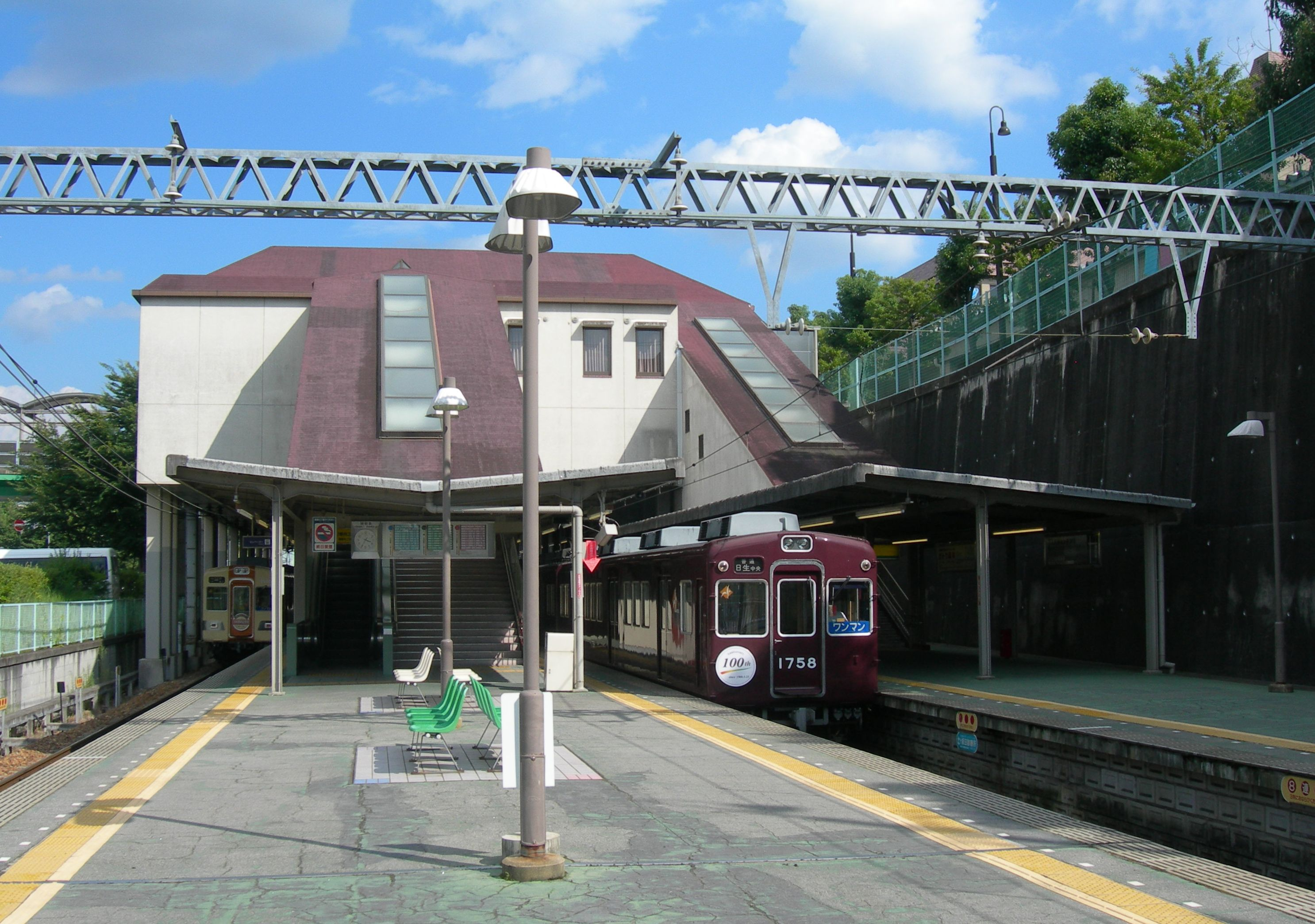
- Nissei-chuo Station platforms, July 2008

General information
- Location: 1 Chome Matsuodai, Inagawa-machi, Kawabe-gun, Hyōgo-ken 666-0261; Japan
- Coordinates: 34°54′23.09″N 135°23′35.75″E
- Operator: Nose Electric Railway
- Line: ■ Nissei Line
- Platforms: 1 island + 1 side platform
- Connections: Bus stop

Other information
- Station code: NS21
- Website: Official website

History
- Opened: 12 December 1978

Passengers
- FY2019: 6,474 daily
Location
- Location within Hyōgo Prefecture Location within Japan

Nissei-chuo Station (日生中央駅, Nissei-chūō-eki) is a passenger railway station located in the town of Inagawa, Hyōgo Prefecture, Japan. It is operated by the private transportation company Nose Electric Railway. "Nissei" is named after Nippon Life Insurance Company.

== Lines ==
Nissei-chuo Station is served by a 2.6 kilometer Nissei Line, a spur line of the Myōken Line from Yamashita, and is located 10.8 kilometers from Kawanishi-Noseguchi. It is also the terminus of a 2.6 kilometer spur line to Nissei-chuo.

== Station layout ==
The station consists of one island platform and one side platform connected by an elevated station building.

=== Platforms ===
1	■ Nissei Line	mainly for Kawanishi-Noseguchi limited express trains for Umeda on weekday mornings
2	■ Nissei Line	mainly for Yamashita

== Adjacent stations ==
«	Service	»
Nose Railway Nissei Line
Yamashita	All trains	Terminus

== History ==
Nissei-chuo Station opened on 12 December 1978. It became an unstaffed station from 1 April 1991.

== Passenger statistics ==
In fiscal 2019, the station was used by an average of 10,623 passengers daily

== Surrounding area ==
- Nissay Newtown
- Inagawa Town Hall

== See also ==
- List of railway stations in Japan
