= NS =

NS as an abbreviation can mean:

== Arts and entertainment ==
=== Gaming ===
- Natural Selection (video game), a mod for the game Half-Life
- NetStorm: Islands At War, a real-time strategy game published in 1997 by Activision
- Nintendo Switch, a hybrid video game console and handheld.
- NationStates, a web-based simulation game

=== Literature ===
- New Spring (known to fans as "NS"), a 1999 anthology edited by Robert Silverberg and derivative 2004 novella by Robert Jordan
- NS-series robots from the book I, Robot

== Companies ==
- National Semiconductor (also known as "Natsemi"), an American integrated circuit design and manufacturing company
- Nederlandse Spoorwegen, the main public transport railway company in the Netherlands
- Norfolk Southern Railway, a major Class I railroad in the United States, owned by the Norfolk Southern Corporation
- Norfolk Southern Railway (1942–1982), the final name of a railroad running in Virginia and North Carolina before its acquisition by the Southern Railway in 1974

== Government and politics ==
- Nasjonal Samling, a 1930s Norwegian national socialist political party
- National Security Department (noted as NS), a law enforcement agency in Hong Kong
- National service, a name for the conscription system of some militaries
- National Socialism or Nazism, the ideology held by, among other political parties, the National Socialist German Workers Party
- New Serbia (political party) (Nova Srbija), a political party in Serbia
- People's Party (Serbia, 2017) (Narodna stranka), a political party in Serbia
- New Slovenia (also known as Nova Slovenija - Krscanski Ljudska Stranka), a right-of-centre political party in Slovenia
- People's Party (Montenegro) (Narodna Stranka), a political party in the Republic of Montenegro
- National Alliance (Lithuania) (Nacionalinis susivienijimas), a political party in Lithuania

== Places ==
- Negeri Sembilan, one of the fourteen states in Malaysia
- Novi Sad, a city in Serbia (license plate code)
- Nova Scotia, as the official Canadian postal abbreviation for the province

== Science and technology ==
=== Biology and medicine ===
- Nervous system, the system of neurons that coordinates the actions of an organism
- Normal saline, a solution of sodium chloride used in intravenous drips

=== Computing ===
- Name server, a computer server that implements a name service protocol
  - NS record, a DNS record type
- Namespace, an abstract container used in computing
- Neighbor Solicitation, part of IPv6's Neighbor Discovery Protocol
- NeXTSTEP, an object-oriented, multitasking operating system by NeXT, as well as a prefix for certain system-provided classes in the operating system, such as "NSString"
- ns (simulator) (or "ns-2"), an open source network simulator

=== Mathematics ===
- ns (elliptic function), one of Jacobi's elliptic functions
- NS, the Néron–Severi group

=== Other uses in science and technology ===
- Nanosecond (abbreviated "ns"), a measure of time
- Nanostructure
- Neutron star, a star formed from the collapsed remnant of a massive star
- New Shepard 3 (NS3), a reusable launch vehicle from Blue Origin, being tested in 2017-18
- Newton second, the SI derived unit for momentum
- Not significant, when differences between categories are smaller than the amount of error/noise in the data, see Statistical significance
- Nuclear Ship (NS), a ship prefix for civilian ship names
- Norsk Standard, Norwegian Standard, Standards defined by Standard Norge

== Other uses ==
- National school (Ireland), a type of school
- New Style (as "N.S." in opposition to Old Style as "O.S."), indicating either a date in the Julian Calendar with the start of year adjusted to 1 January, or a date in the Gregorian calendar
