= Kawanishi-Noseguchi Station =

Railway station in Kawanishi, Hyōgo Prefecture, Japan

Kawanishi-Noseguchi Station 川西能勢口駅
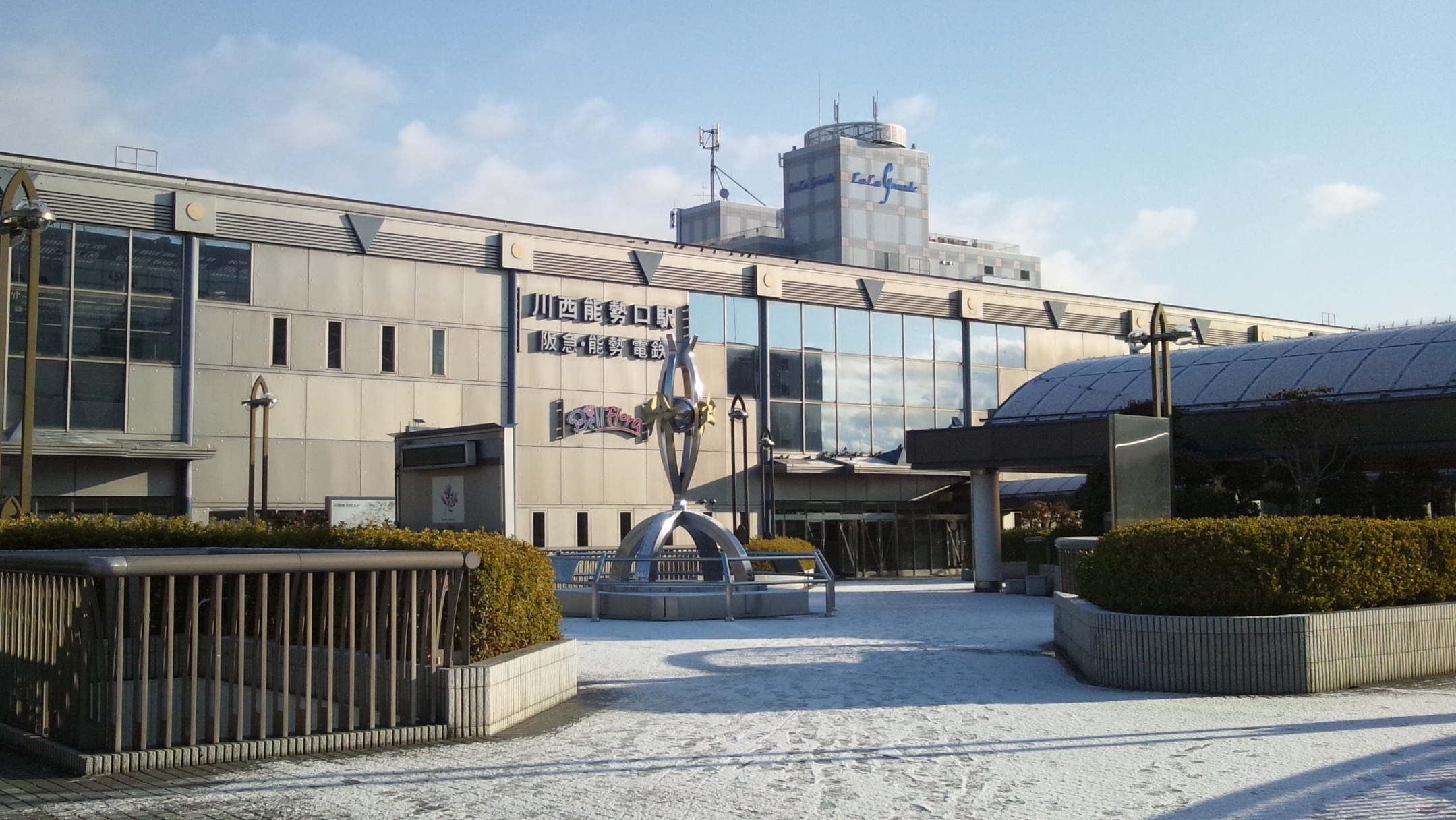
- Kawanishi-Noseguchi Station

General information
- Location: 20-1 Sakaemachi, Kawanishi-shi, Hyōgo-ken 666-0033; Japan
- Coordinates: 34°49′39.5″N 135°24′48.23″E
- Operator: Hankyu Railway; Nosé Electric Railway
- Lines: ■ Takarazuka Main Line; ■ Myōken Line
- Platforms: 1 island + 3 bay platforms
- Connections: Bus terminal

Other information
- Status: Staffed
- Station code: HK-50, NS01

History
- Opened: 8 April 1913; 113 years ago
- Former names: Noseguchi (until 1965)

Passengers
- FY2019: 44,636 daily (Hankyu); 45,340 (Nose)

Services
Preceding station	Hankyu Railway	Following station
Ikeda HK-49 towards Osaka-umeda	Takarazuka Main Line Local Express	Hibarigaoka-Hanayashiki HK-51 towards Takarazuka
Ikeda HK-49 towards Osaka-umeda	Takarazuka Main Line Semi-Express	Hibarigaoka-Hanayashiki HK-51 One-way operation
Ikeda HK-49 towards Osaka-umeda	Takarazuka Main Line Commuter Limited Express	Terminus
Ikeda HK-49 towards Osaka-umeda	Nissei Express	through to Myōken Line
Preceding station	Nosé Electric Railway	Following station
Terminus	Myōken Line Local	Kinunobebashi NS02 towards Myōkenguchi
through to Takarazuka Line	Nissei Express	Hirano NS07 towards Nissei-chuo
Location
- Location within Hyōgo Prefecture Location within Japan

Kawanishi-Noseguchi Station (川西能勢口駅, Kawanishi-Noseguchi-eki) is a junction passenger railway station located in the city of Kawanishi, Hyōgo Prefecture, Japan. It is operated by the private transportation companies Nose Electric Railway and Hankyu Railway. It is connected to the Kawanishi-Ikeda Station on the West Japan Railway Company (JR West) Fukuchiyama Line (JR Takarazuka Line) by an elevated walkway

== Lines ==
Kawanishi-Noseguchi Station is served by the Hankyu Takarazuka Line and is 17.2 kilometers (10.7 mi) from the terminus of the line at Osaka-umeda. It is also the terminus of the 12.2-kilometer (7.6 mi) Nose Electric Railways's Myōken Line. It is a major service station, featuring stops for all local and express trains, including the special Nissei Express (日生エクスプレス), a commuter train specifically for commuters from the Kawanishi area to Osaka.

== Layout ==
The station consists of an island platform and three bay platforms serving a total office tracks. The ticket gates (two on the east and west sides) and the concourse are on the 2nd floor, and the platform is on the 3rd floor of the station building.

=== Platforms ===
1	■ Hankyu Takarazuka Line	for Takarazuka, Nigawa, Nishinomiya-Kitaguchi, Imazu and Kobe-Sannomiya
2	■ Hankyu Takarazuka Line	for Osaka-umeda, Minoo, Kyoto-kawaramachi and Kita-Senri (used on weekday rush hours)
3	■ Hankyu Takarazuka Line	for Osaka-umeda, Minoo, Kyoto-kawaramachi and Kita-Senri (usually used)
3	■ Nose Railway	limited express trains for Nissei-Chūō (weekday evenings)
4	■ Nose Railway	local trains for Nissei-Chūō and Myōkenguchi (usually used)
5	■ Nose Railway	local trains for Nissei-Chūō and Myōkenguchi (weekday rush hours)

== History ==
Kawanishi-Noseguchi Station opened on 8 April 1913, as Noseguchi Station (能勢口駅) of the Minoh Arima Electric Tramway (now Hankyu Corporation). It was renamed to its present name on 1 July 1965.

== Passenger statistics ==
In fiscal 2019, the Hankyu portion of the station was used by an average of 44,636 passengers daily and the Nose Electric portion of the station was used by 45,340 passengers daily

== Surrounding area ==
- Kawanishi-Ikeda Station (West Japan Railway Company)

=== Hankyu Kawamishi-Noseguchi bus stops ===
transit bus (Hankyu Bus Co., Ltd.)
Bus stop 1 (Sugio Route)	Route 5 for Matsugaoka, Hagiwaradai and Hagiwara; Route 15 for Matsugaoka, Hagiwaradai, Hachioji Jinja-mae (Hachioji Shrine) and Marunouchicho; Route 5 terminating at Hagiwaradai via Matsugaoka
Bus stop 2 (Sugio Route, Keyakizaka Route, Manganji Route)	Route 12 for Nissei-chuo via Marunouchicho, Yatou, Tadaohashi, Seiwadai, Hirone and Yuda; Route 12 for Yuda via Marunouchicho, Yatou, Tadaohashi, Seiwadai and Hirone; Route 12 for Hankyu Bus Seiwadai Office via Marunouchicho, Yatou and Tadaohashi; Route 13 for Keyakizaka Gochome circulating Keyakizaka via Marunouchicho, Yatou and Tadaohashi; Route 30 for Nishi-Tada Itchome, Uguisudai and Hagiwaradai via Marunouchicho and Yatou; Route 150 for Atagohara Golf Club via Hibarigaoka-Hanayashiki Station and Manganji
Bus stop 3 (Sugio Route, Keyakizaka Route)	Route 4 for Minami-Nosaka, Yuyamadai and Meiho Elementary School via Hagiwaradai and Kinshodai; Route 3 for Keyakizaka Gochome and Hankyu Bus Seiwadai Office circulating Keyakizaka via Hagiwaradai, Uguisudai and Keyakizaka Nichome; Route 33 for Keyakizaka Nichome circulating Keyakizaka via Hagiwaradai, Uguisudai and Keyakizaka Gochome; Midnight bus for Keyakizaka Gochome circulating Keyakizaka via Hagiwaradai, Uguisudai and Keyakizaka Nichome
Bus stop 4 (Sugio Route, Inagawa Park Town Route, Tsutsujigaoka Route)	Route 1 for Hankyu Bus Seiwadai Office via Hagiwaradai and Uguisudai; Limited Express Route 1 for Hankyu Bus Seiwadai Office (no stops from Hankyu Kawanichi-Noseguchi higashiguchi to Seiwadai-minami); Route 2 for Yuda via Hagiwaradai, Uguisudai, Seiwadai and Hirone; Route 9 for Nissei-Chuo via Hagiwaradai, Uguisudai, Seiwadai, Tsutsujigaoka Itchome, Tsutsujigaoka Gochome, Tsutsujigaoka, Ginzanguchi, Ohara Park and Yuda; Route 9 for Park Town Chuo via Hagiwaradai, Uguisudai, Seiwadai, Tsutsujigaoka Itchome, Tsutsujigaoka Gochome, Tsutsujigaoka, Ginzanguchi and Ohara Park; Route 9 for Tsutsujigaoka Nichome via Hagiwaradai, Uguisudai, Seiwadai and Tsutsujigaoka Itchome; Route 9 for Tsutsujigaoka Gochome via Hagiwaradai, Uguisudai, Seiwadai and Tsutsujigaoka Itchome; Route 10 for Minami-Nosaka Nichome via Kawanishi-Meiho High School (no stops from Hankyu Kawanichi-Noseguchi higashiguchi to Hagiwaradai)
Bus stop 5 (Inagawa Park Town Route)	Route 6 for Nissei-Chuo via Hagiwaradai, Uguisudai, Seiwadai, Tsutsujigaoka, Park Plaza, Shirogane Sanchome and Yuda; Route 6 for Park Town Chuo via Hagiwaradai, Uguisudai, Seiwadai, Tsutsujigaoka, Park Plaza and Shirogane Sanchome; Express Route 6 for Nissei-Chuo via Hagiwaradai, Uguisudai, Tsutsujigaoka, Park Plaza, Shirogane Sanchome and Yuda (no stops from Nishi-Tada to Seiwadai-chuo); Route 7 for Nissei-Chuo via Hagiwaradai, Uguisudai, Seiwadai, Tsutsujigaoka, Park Plaza, Ohara Park and Yuda; Route 8 for Nissei-Chuo via Hagiwaradai, Uguisudai, Seiwadai, Tsutsujigaoka, Ginzanguchi, Shirogane Sanchome and Yuda; Midnight bus for Park Town Chuo via Hagiwaradai, Uguisudai, Seiwadai, Tsutsujigaoka, Park Plaza and Shirogane Sanchome; Midnight bus for Hankyu Bus Seiwadai Office via Hagiwaradai and Uguisudai
Bus stop 6 (Togendai Route, Takarazuka-Kawanishi Route)	Route 62 for Hankyu Itami via Uekamo, JGSDF Camp Itami and Itamizasa; Route 64 for JR Itami via Uekamo, JGSDF Camp Itami, Itamizasa and Hankyu Itami; Route 64 for JR Kawanishi-Ikeda; Route 61 for Kitamura via Uekamo and JGSDF Camp Itami; Route 92 for Takarazuka via Takarazuka City Hospital (going to the entrance of Takarazuka City Hospital on weekdays, or the stop near Takarazuka Interchange on weekends and holidays)
Bus stop 7 (Amagasaki Route)	Route 56 for Hanshin Amagasaki via Kushiroguchi, Kitamura, Itami-Chuo, Tsukashin and Ohama; Route 56 for Hankyu Bus Itami Office via Kushiroguchi, Kitamura and Itami-Chuo

== See also ==
- List of railway stations in Japan
