= Inagawa Keikoku Prefectural Natural Park =

Natural park of Hyogo prefecture, Japan

- 猪名川渓谷県立自然公園
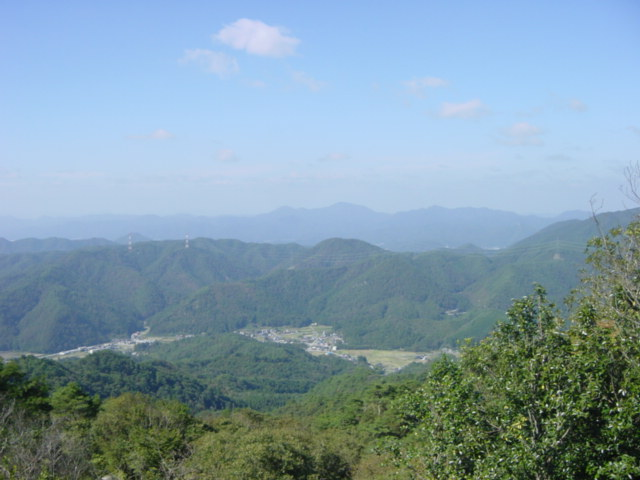
- Mount Ōya (753.5m)

- Location within Hyōgo Prefecture Location within Japan
- Location: Hyōgo Prefecture, Japan
- Coordinates: 35°N 135.325°E
- Area: 93.52 km^{2} (36.11 sq mi)
- Established: 27 April 1957

Inagawa Keikoku Prefectural Natural Park (猪名川渓谷県立自然公園, Inagawa Keikoku kenritsu shizen kōen) is a Prefectural Natural Park in southeast Hyōgo Prefecture, Japan. Established in 1957, the park spans the municipalities of Inagawa, Kawanishi and Sasayama.

== See also ==
- National Parks of Japan
- Taki Renzan Prefectural Natural Park
