= Tada Station (Hyōgo) =

Railway station in Kawanishi, Hyōgo Prefecture, Japan

Tada Station 多田駅
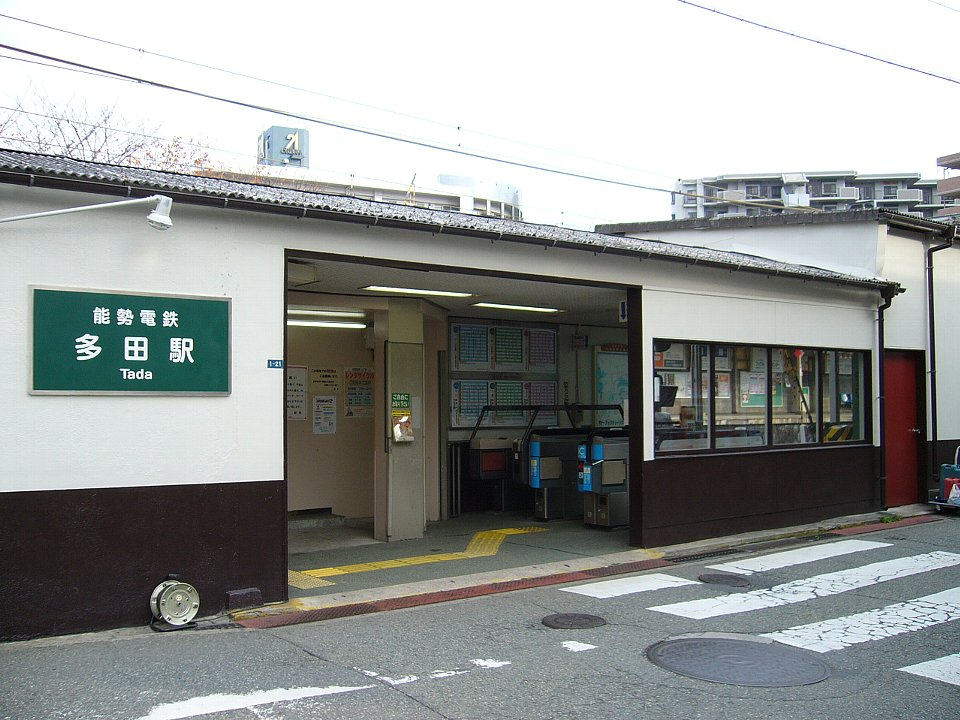
- Tada Station, December, 2006

General information
- Location: 3-chōme-1 Higashitada, Kawanishi-shi, Hyōgo-ken 666-0122; Japan
- Coordinates: 34°51′38.92″N 135°24′59.45″E
- Operator: Nosé Electric Railway
- Line: Myōken Line
- Distance: 4.2 km (2.6 miles) from Kawanishi-Noseguchi
- Platforms: 2 side platforms

Other information
- Status: Unstaffed
- Station code: NS06
- Website: Official website

History
- Opened: 13 April 1913; 113 years ago

Passengers
- FY2019: 7,271 daily

Services
Preceding station	Nosé Electric Railway	Following station
Tsuzumigataki towards Kawanishi-Noseguchi	Myōken Line Local	Hirano towards Myōkenguchi
Location
- Location within Hyōgo Prefecture Location within Japan

Tada Station (多田駅, Tada-eki) is a passenger railway station located in the city of Kawanishi, Hyōgo Prefecture, Japan. It is operated by the private transportation company Nose Electric Railway.

== Lines ==
Tada Station is served by the Myōken Line, and is located 4.2 kilometers (2.6 mi) from the terminus of the line at Kawanishi-Noseguchi.

== Station layout ==
The station consists of two opposed unnumbered side platforms, connected by a level crossing. All ticket gates are located on the north side of the platform for Hirano. The platform had been extended to accommodate six-car trains, but due to barrier-free construction in 2010, the effective length of the Yamashita-bound platform was shortened to five cars.

=== Platforms ===
West	■ Myoken Line	for Yamashita, Myōkenguchi, Nissei Chūō
East	■ Myoken Line	from Nissei Chūō for Kawanishi-noseguchi

== History ==
Tada Station opened on 13 April 1913. It was relocated to its current location on 8 June 1952.

== Passenger statistics ==
In fiscal 2019, the station was used by an average of 7,271 passengers daily

== Surrounding area ==
- Tada Shrine
- Toyo Tire & Rubber Research and Development Center

== See also ==
- List of railway stations in Japan
