= Takiyama Station =

Railway station in Kawanishi, Hyōgo Prefecture, Japan

Takiyama Station 滝山駅
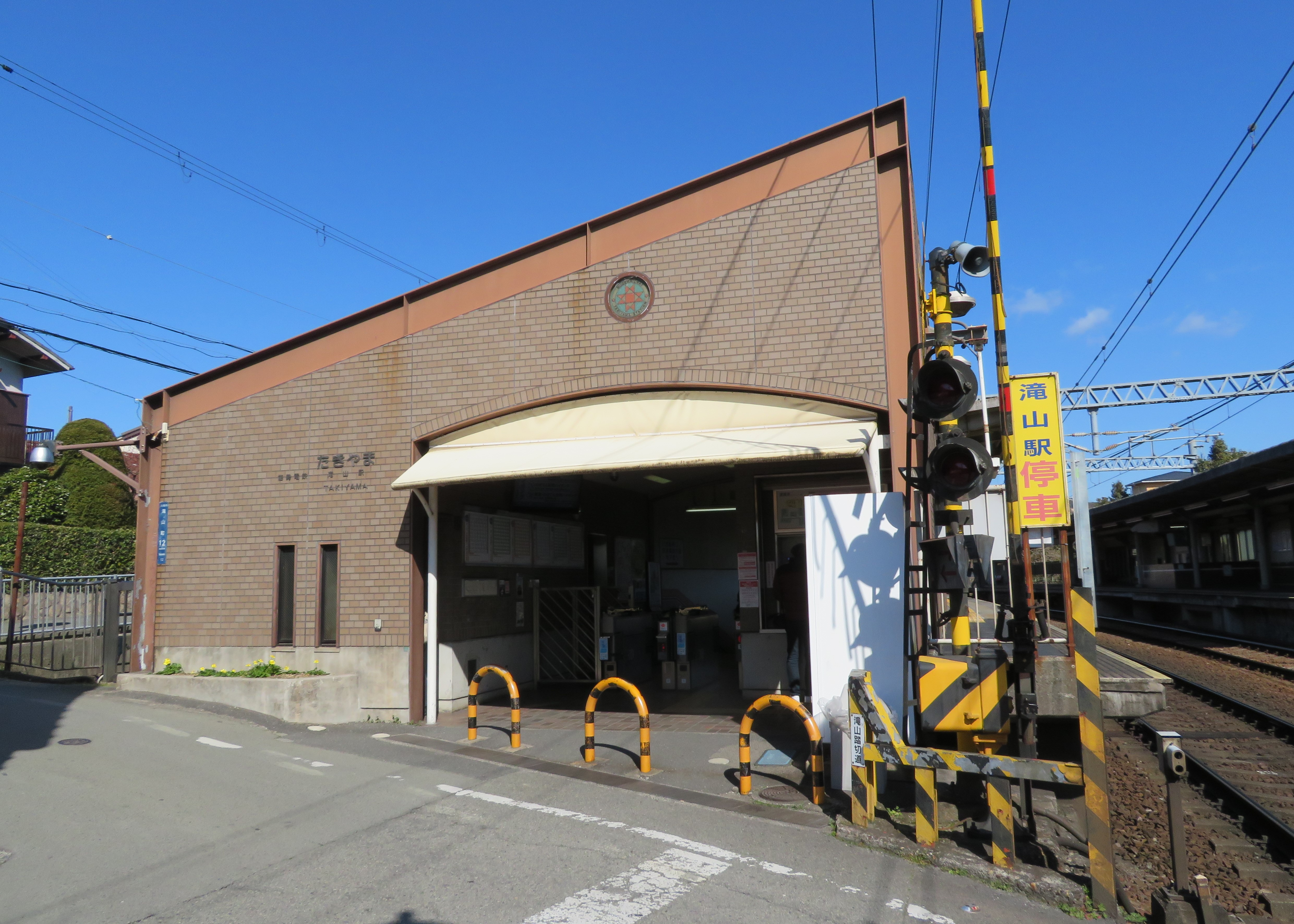
- Takiyama Station, February 2020

General information
- Location: 12 Takiyamachō, Kawanishi-shi, Hyōgo-ken 666-0002; Japan
- Coordinates: 34°50′33.48″N 135°25′15.72″E
- Operator: Nose Electric Railway
- Line: ■ Myōken Line
- Distance: 2.1 km (1.3 miles) from Kawanishi-Noseguchi
- Platforms: 2 side platforms

Other information
- Status: Unstaffed
- Station code: NS03
- Website: Official website

History
- Opened: 13 April 1913; 113 years ago

Passengers
- FY2019: 2071 daily

Services
Preceding station	Nosé Electric Railway	Following station
Kinunobebashi towards Kawanishi-Noseguchi	Myōken Line Local	Uguisunomori towards Myōkenguchi
Location
- Location within Hyōgo Prefecture Location within Japan

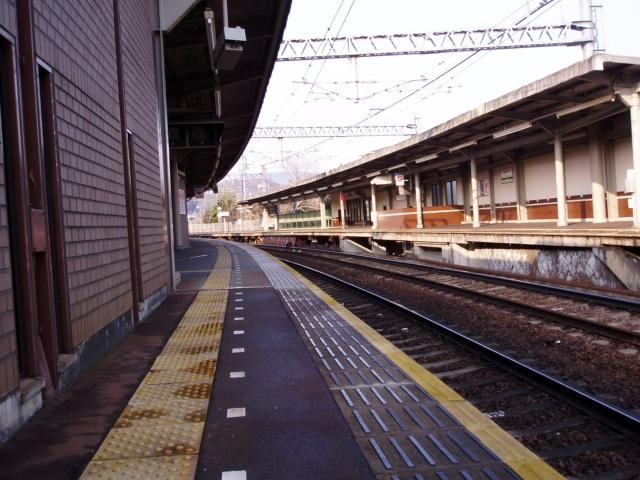
Nose Railway, Takiyama Station platforms

Takiyama Station (滝山駅, Takiyama-eki) is a passenger railway station located in the city of Kawanishi, Hyōgo Prefecture, Japan. It is operated by the private transportation company Nose Electric Railway.

== Lines ==
Takiyama Station is served by the Myōken Line, and is located 2.1 kilometers (1.3 mi) from the terminus of the line at Kawanishi-Noseguchi. I

== Station layout ==
The station two opposed ground-level side platforms. Of all Nose Electric Railway lines, this station in particular has a curved platform, and there is a wide gap between the platform and the train. The platform has an effective length of 6 cars, but currently only 4-car trains stop here. The station is unattended.

=== Platforms ===
1	■ Myoken Line	for Yamashita Myōkenguchi, Nissei Chūō
2	■ Myoken Line	from Nissei Chūō for Kawanishi-noseguchi

== History ==
Takiyama Station opened on 13 April 1913.

== Passenger statistics ==
In fiscal 2019, the station was used by an average of 2071 passengers daily

== Surrounding area ==
- Hyogo Prefectural Route 12 Kawanishi Sasayama Line
- Kawanishi Municipal Kawanishi Kita Elementary School

== See also ==
- List of railway stations in Japan
