= Ikeda Route =

Expressway in the Osaka area

Hanshin Expressway Route 11 Ikeda Route 阪神高速11号池田線
- The Ikeda Route highlighted in red

Route information
- Maintained by Hanshin Expressway Company, Limited
- Length: 14.2 km (8.8 mi)
- Existed: 1965–present

Section 1
- South end: Nakanoshima Junction in Osaka; Loop Route
- North end: Ikeda entrance/exit in Ikeda; National Route 176 / Osaka Prefecture Route 10

Ikeda Route spur route
- Length: 6.6 km (4.1 mi)
- South end: Hotarugaike Junction in Toyonaka; Ikeda Route (main route)
- North end: Ikeda-Kibe Interchange in Ikeda; National Route 176 / National Route 423

Location
- Country: Japan

Highway system
- National highways of Japan; Expressways of Japan

The Ikeda Route (池田線, Ikeda-sen), signed as Route 11, is one of the routes of the Hanshin Expressway system serving the Keihanshin area in Japan. It is a radial route that travels in a south to north direction from central Osaka to Itami Airport and Ikeda, with a length of 14.2 kilometers (8.8 mi). Along with its spur route, it has a total length of 21.6 kilometers (13.4 mi).

== Route description ==
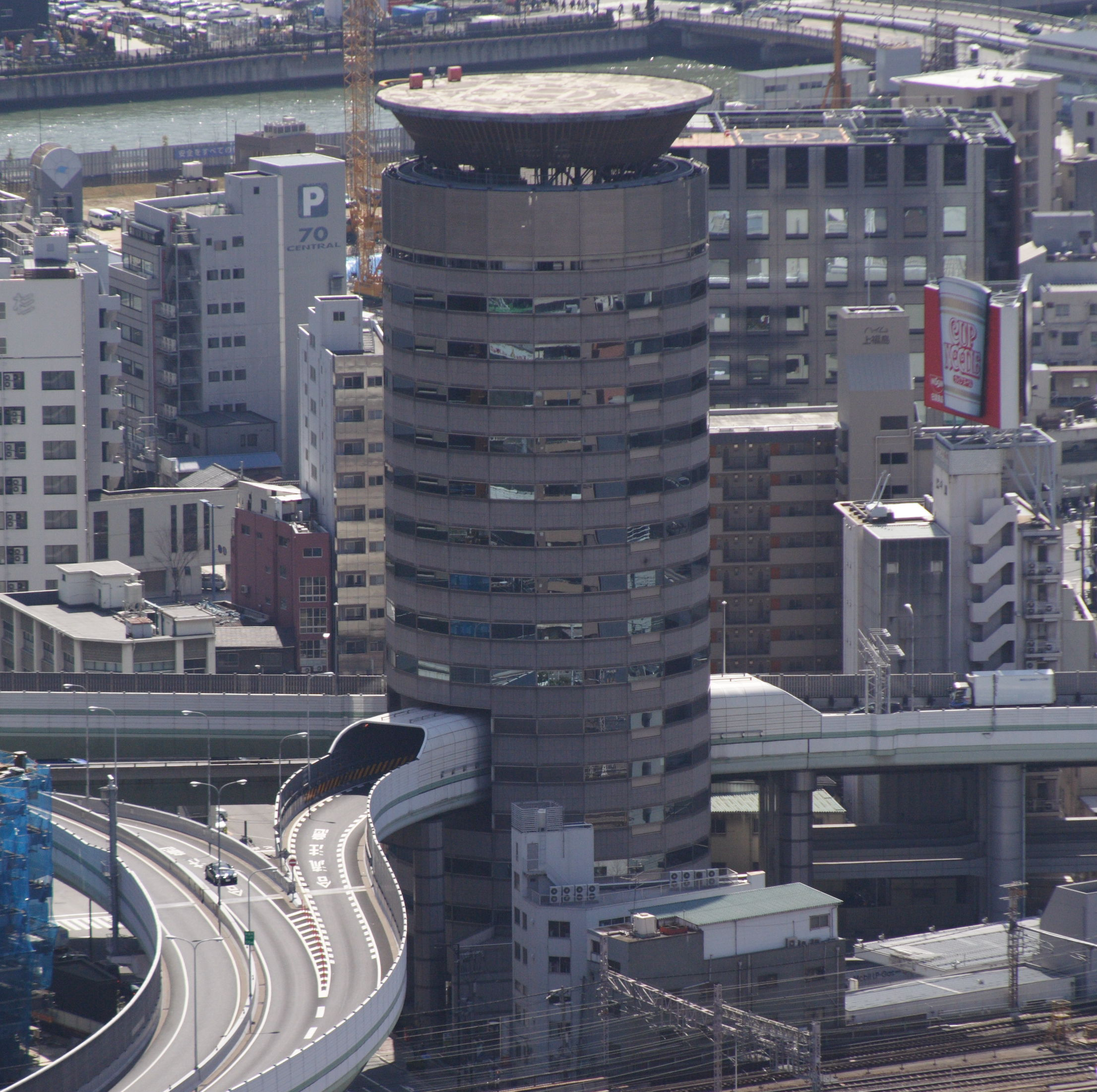
The Ikeda Route and the Gate Tower Building in Fukushima-ku, Osaka. An exit ramp from the expressway occupies part of the building's 5th-7th floors.

The Ikeda Route begins at Nakanoshima Junction in Nishi-ku, Osaka, where it meets the Loop Route. Curving to the north just south of Osaka Station, the expressway serves the station and the Umeda commercial, business, shopping, and entertainment district. The southbound exit ramp to the area is the Ikeda Route's most notable feature, an exit ramp that passes through the Gate Tower Building, taking up part of the building's fifth, sixth, and seventh floors.

From there it travels northwest from central Osaka, crossing the Yodo River. After this, the expressway crosses through the city's Nishiyodogawa and Yodogawa wards, then it crosses into the city of Toyonaka where it curves to the north. In Toyonaka it meets the Meishin Expressway at Toyonaka Interchange. Approaching the vicinity of Itami Airport, it slowly begins to curve to the northwest again. An interchange connects the airport to the expressway. Just north of the airport interchange, the spur route of the Ikeda Route begins, heading northwest, while the main route meets its northern terminus just beyond the junction. The main route ends at an at-grade intersection with National Route 176 and Osaka Prefecture Route 10 just south of the Ikeda Interchange on the Chūgoku Expressway.

== History ==
The first section of what come to be known as the Ikeda Route opened in 1965 between the Loop Route and Umeda. The spur of the Ikeda Route was completed in 1998.

== List of interchanges ==
The entire expressway lies within Osaka Prefecture.

Location	km	mi	Exit	Name	Destinations	Notes
Osaka	0.0	0.0	–	Nakanoshima	Loop Route – to Kinki Expressway	Southern terminus
Osaka	0.5	0.31	11-01	Deiribashi	National Route 2 – Osaka Station, Nodahanshin, Umeda-shinmichi	Northbound exit only
Osaka	0.6	0.37	11-02	Nakanoshima	Unnamed city street	Northbound entrance only
Osaka	1.0	0.62	11-03	Umeda	Kujō-Umeda Route – Osaka Station	Northbound entrance, southbound exit
Osaka	1.8	1.1	11-04	Fukushima	Naniwa-suji – Fukushima, Umeda, Ebie	Northbound entrance, southbound exit
Osaka	3.6	2.2	11-05	Tsukamoto	Himejima-dōri – Jūsō, Himejima	Northbound exit, southbound entrance
Osaka	5.4	3.4	11-06	Kashima	Osaka Prefecture Route 10 (Mitejima-suji) – Toyonaka, Jūsō, Amagasaki	Northbound exit, southbound entrance
Toyonaka	8.6	5.3	11-07	Toyonaka	Meishin Expressway – Nishinomiya, Kyoto	
Toyonaka	8.6– 9.8	5.3– 6.1	11-08	Toyonaka-minami	Osaka Prefecture Route 10 (Osaka-Ikeda Route)	
Toyonaka	12.0	7.5	11-09	Toyonaka-kita	Osaka Prefecture Route 10 (Osaka-Ikeda Route) – Itami	Northbound exit, southbound entrance
Toyonaka	12.7	7.9		Osaka Airport Toll Booth		Tolls are collected only for southbound traffic here
Toyonaka	13.2	8.2	11-10	Osaka Airport	Osaka Airport	Northbound exit, southbound entrance
Toyonaka	13.4	8.3	–	Hotarugaike	Ikeda Route (spur route) north – Nose, Kameoka, Kawanishi-Obana	Northbound exit, southbound entrance
Ikeda	14.2	8.8	11-11	Ikeda	National Route 176 / Osaka Prefecture Route 10 – to Chūgoku Expressway	Northern terminus of main route; northbound exit, southbound entrance
1.000 mi = 1.609 km; 1.000 km = 0.621 mi: Incomplete access

== Spur route ==
The Ikeda Route has a spur route that travels north from its southern terminus with the main route of the Ikeda Route at Hotarugaike Junction in Toyonaka to its northern terminus at National Route 173 in Ikeda.

=== Route description ===
The spur of the Ikeda Route begins at Hotarugaike Junction in Toyonaka where it meets its parent route. The expressway travels around the northeastern edge of Itami Airport, briefly crossing into Itami, Hyōgo before crossing back into the city of Ikeda in Osaka Prefecture. The expressway then begins paralleling the Ina River as it travels north toward Kawanishi, once again briefly switching to the opposite shore of the river in Hyōgo Prefecture, before returning into Osaka. The route meets its northern terminus at an interchange with national routes 173 and 423 just north of Satsukiyama Zoo.

=== List of interchanges ===
Prefecture	Location	km	mi	Exit	Name	Destinations	Notes
Osaka	Toyonaka	13.4	8.3	–	Hotarugaike	Ikeda Route (main route) south	Southern terminus of the spur route; northbound entrance, southbound exit
Osaka	Ikeda	17.6	10.9	11-12	Koda	National Route 176 south – to Osaka Airport	Northbound entrance, southbound exit
Hyōgo	Kawanishi	18.7	11.6	11-13	Kawanishi-Obana	National Route 176 – Takarazuka, Central Kawanishi, Osaka, Ikeda	Northbound exit, southbound entrance
Osaka	Ikeda	20.8	12.9	11-14 / 11-15	Ikeda-Kibe	National Route 423 north – Kameoka; National Route 176 north – Nose	Northern terminus of spur route; northbound exit, southbound entrance
1.000 mi = 1.609 km; 1.000 km = 0.621 mi: Incomplete access
