= Kamo site =

Yayoi period settlement trace in Kawanishi, Hyōgo, Japan

- 加茂遺跡 (Japanese)
- Kamo site Kamo site (Japan)
- Interactive map of Kamo site
- 34°49′15.4″N 135°24′28.1″E
- Type: Settlement trace
- Periods: Yayoi period
- Location: Kawanishi, Hyōgo, Japan
- Region: Kansai region

Site notes
- Public access: Yes (park and museum)

The Kamo site (加茂遺跡, Kamo iseki) is an archaeological site with the traces of a Yayoi period settlement located in the Minamihanayashiki neighborhood of the city of Kawanishi, Hyōgo Prefecture, in the Kansai region of Japan. It was designated a National Historic Site in 2000.

== Overview ==
The Kamo site is located at an elevation of about 40 meters on the edge of the Itami Plateau, where the Ina River flows from the Hokusetsu Hills to the Nishisetsu Plain, at the very southern tip of Kawanishi city. It is an archaeological site with traces from the Japanese Paleolithic period to the Heian period, and is estimated to have become a large-scale settlement in the middle of the Yayoi period. The site was discovered in 1911, when a dotaku was founded the eastern slope of the plateau. Afterwards, the production site of stone tools was discovered. Excavations were conducted 225 times from 1952 through 2007, which confirmed that the site measures 800 meters from east-to-west by 400 meters from north-to-south. The remains of the mid-Yayoi period that make up the center of the ruins include six pillar-supported buildings, 40 pit dwellings, 22 square grooved tombs, 12 earthenware coffin tombs, 38 wooden coffins and pit tombs, The structure of the entire village, including residential areas and cemeteries, was surrounded by a moat. The center of the settlement is located in the eastern half, which has a higher elevation, and this area contains most of the Yayoi pottery discovered, along with a large amount of relics. The tombs are concentrated in the western part of the village. The 1992 excavation discovered the foundations for a large pillar-supported building with a square enclosure, which may have been the residence of a chieftain, or a structure of religious significance.

In 1936, the Miyagawa Stone Tool Museum (宮川石器館, Miyagawa sekki-kan) was opened near the site to exhibit earthenware and stone tools collected at the Kamo site. In 1993, the Kawanishi Cultural Assets Museum (川西市文化財資料館, Kawanishishi bunkazai shiryōkan) was opened near the site to relics excavated from this and other site around Kawanishi City.

The site is about a 20-minute walk from Kawanishi-Ikeda Station on the JR West Fukuchiyama Line.

== See also ==
- List of Historic Sites of Japan (Hyōgo)
