= Tokiwadai Station (Osaka) =

Railway station in Toyono, Osaka Prefecture, Japan

Tokiwadai Station ときわ台駅
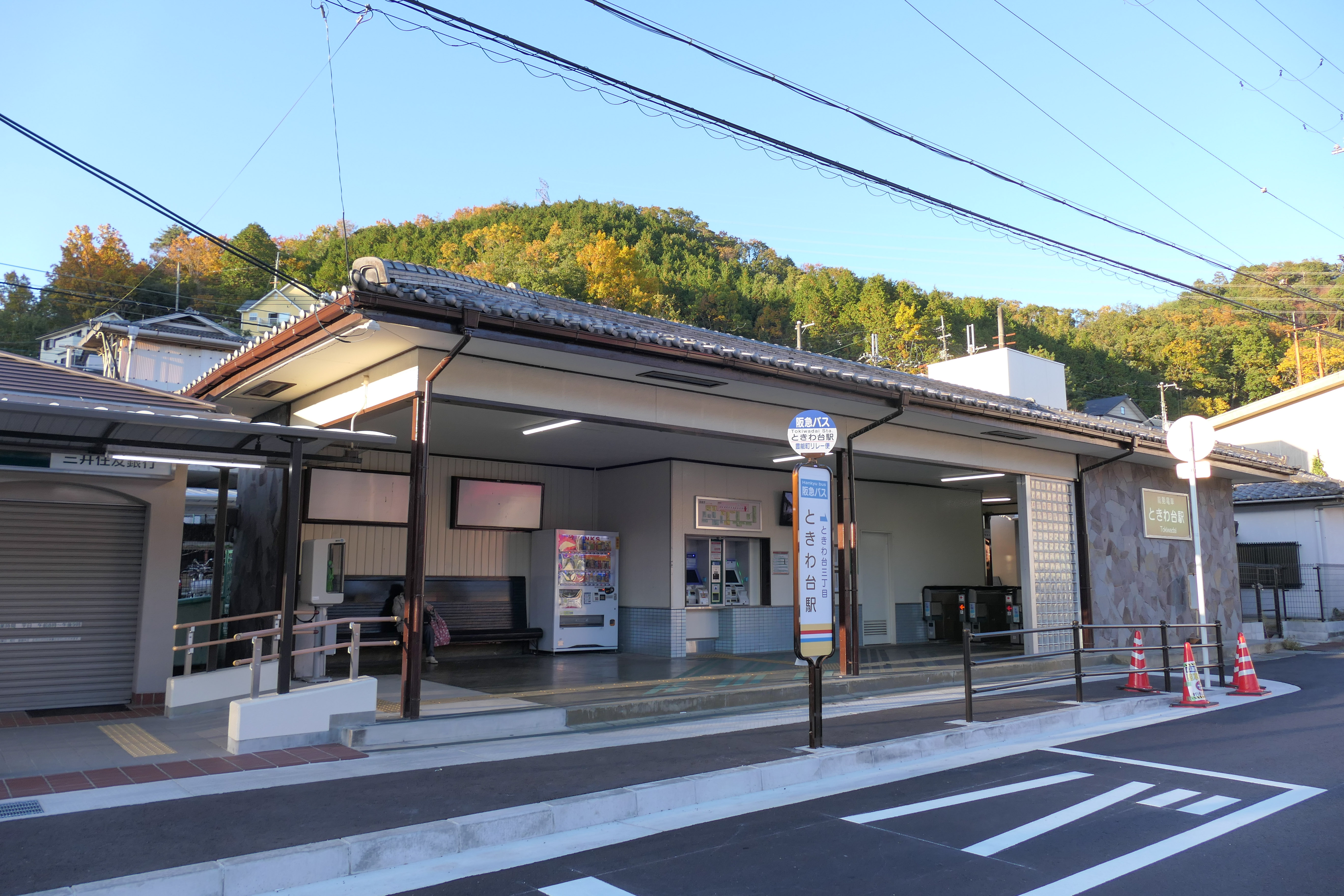
- Tokiwadai Station, November 2020

General information
- Location: 1-43 Tokiwadai, Toyono-chō, Toyono-gun, Osaka-fu 563-0102; Japan
- Coordinates: 34°54′20.84″N 135°26′16.32″E
- Operator: Nose Electric Railway
- Line: ■ Myōken Line
- Distance: 11.2 km (7.0 miles) from Kawanishi-Noseguchi
- Platforms: 1 side platform

Other information
- Status: Unstaffed
- Station code: NS13
- Website: Official website

History
- Opened: 7 July 1968; 58 years ago

Passengers
- FY2019: 2,205 daily
Location
- Location within Osaka Prefecture Location within Japan

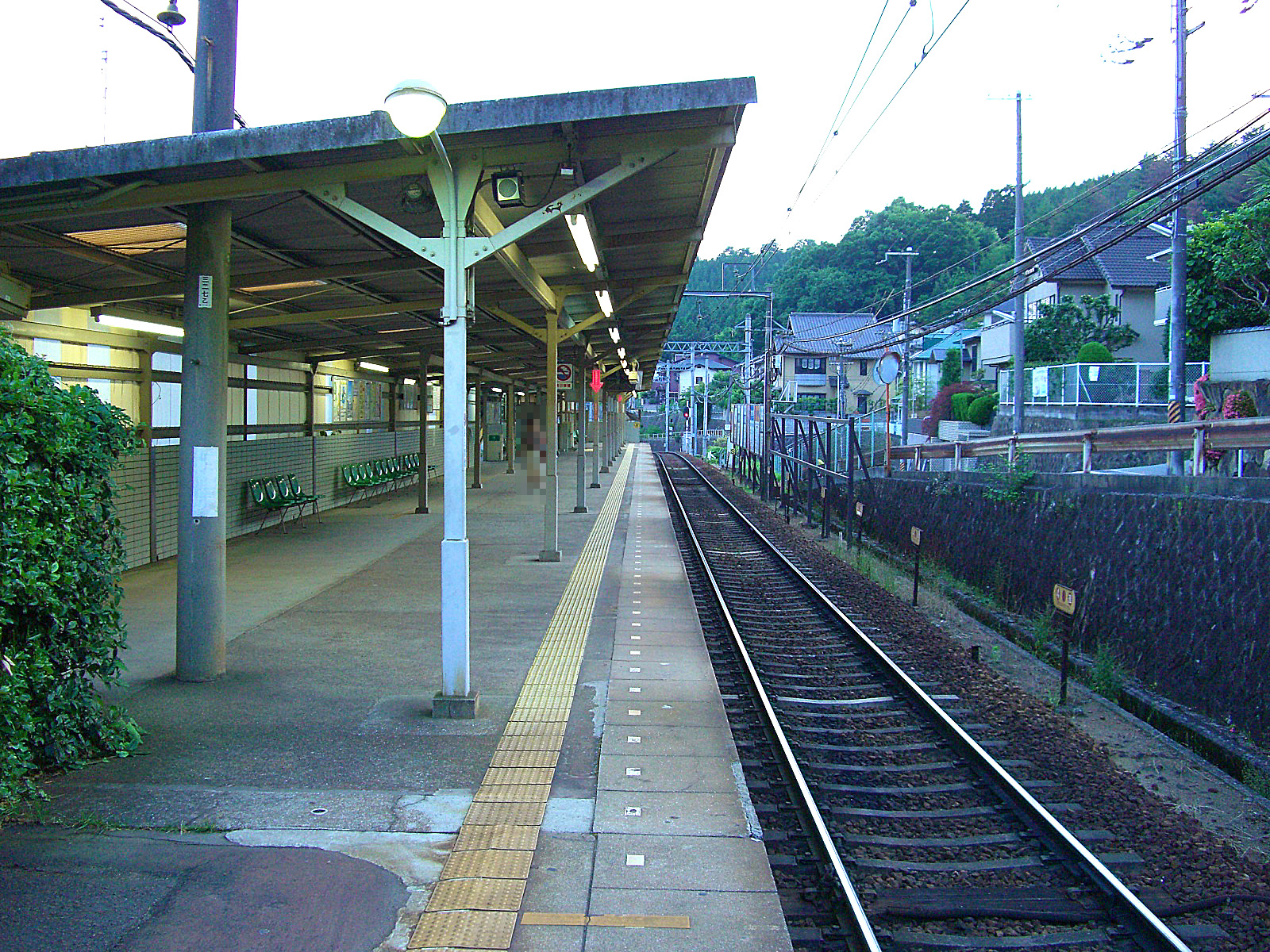
Platform

Tokiwadai Station (ときわ台駅, Tokiwadai-eki) is a passenger railway station located in the town of Toyono, Toyono District, Osaka Prefecture, Japan. It is operated by the private transportation company Nose Electric Railway.

== Lines ==
Tokiwadai Station is served by the Myōken Line, and is located 11.2 kilometers (7.0 mi) from the terminus of the line at Kawanishi-Noseguchi.

== Station layout ==
The station consists of one side platform serving single bi-directional track. The effective length of the platform is for four-carriage trains. There are stairs and an elevator from the ticket gate to the platform, and there are no ramps, but the stairs are equipped with two-step handrails. The platform has a waiting room. The station is unattended.

== Adjacent stations ==
«	Service	»
Nose Railway Myōken Line
Kōfūdai	Myoken Express	Myōkenguchi
Kōfūdai	Local	Myōkenguchi

== History ==
Tokiwadai Station opened on 7 July 1968.

== Passenger statistics ==
In fiscal 2019, the station was used by an average of 2,205 passengers daily

== Surrounding area ==
- Toyono Municipal Yoshikawa Junior High School

== See also ==
- List of railway stations in Japan
