= Itami Station (JR West) =

Railway station in Itami, Hyōgo Prefecture, Japan

Itami Station 伊丹駅
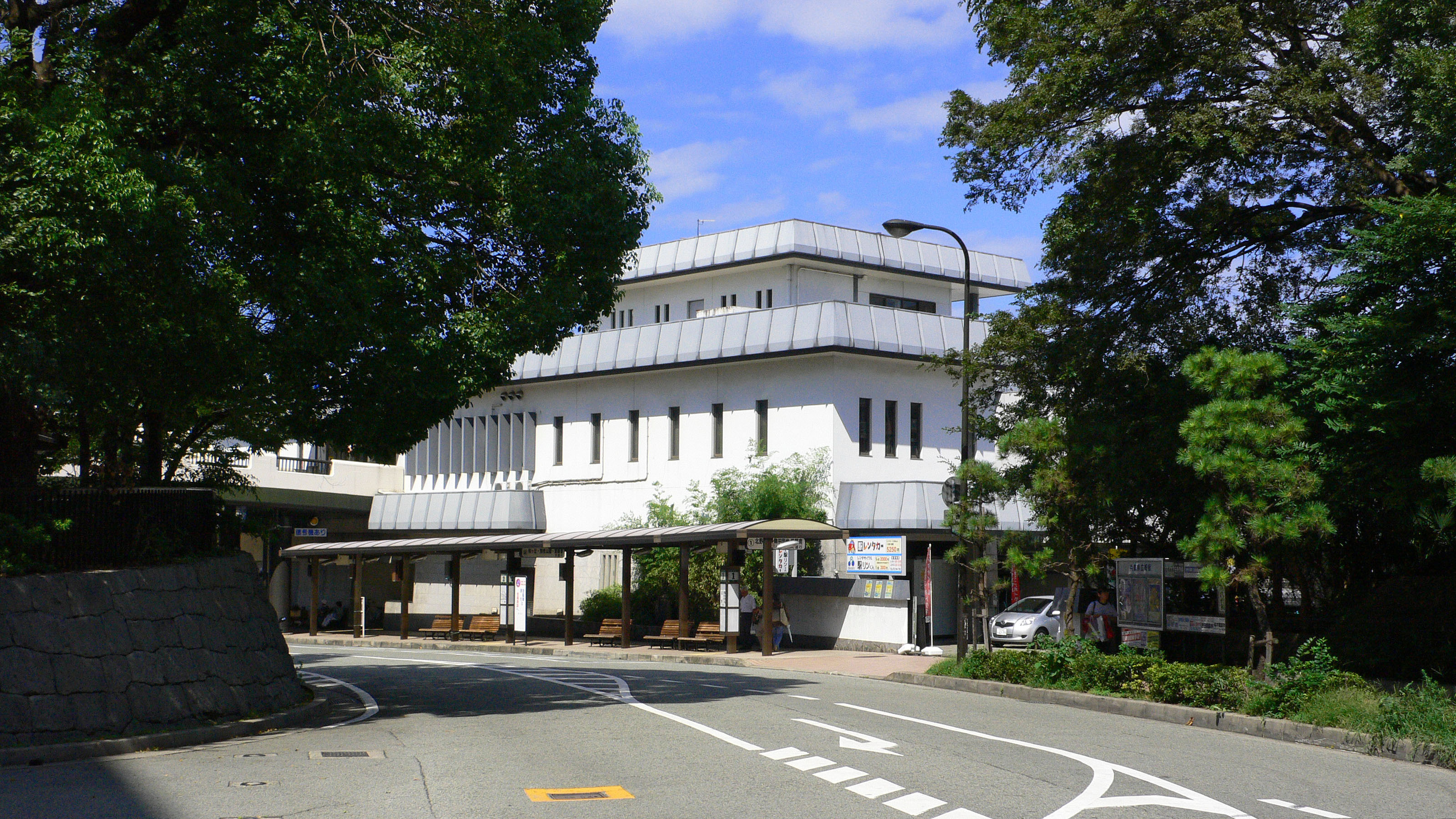
- Itami Station

General information
- Location: 1-chōme-15 Itami, Itami-shi, Hyōgo-ken 664-0846; Japan
- Coordinates: 34°46′50.28″N 135°25′17.99″E
- Owner: West Japan Railway Company
- Operator: West Japan Railway Company
- Lines: Fukuchiyama Line (JR Takarazuka Line)
- Distance: 5.8 km (3.6 miles) from Amagasaki
- Platforms: 2 side platforms
- Connections: Bus stop

Construction
- Structure type: Ground level
- Accessible: None

Other information
- Status: Staffed (Midori no Madoguchi)
- Station code: JR-G52
- Website: Official website

History
- Opened: 12 December 1893

Passengers
- FY2016: 24,285 daily
Location
- Location within Hyōgo Prefecture Location within Japan

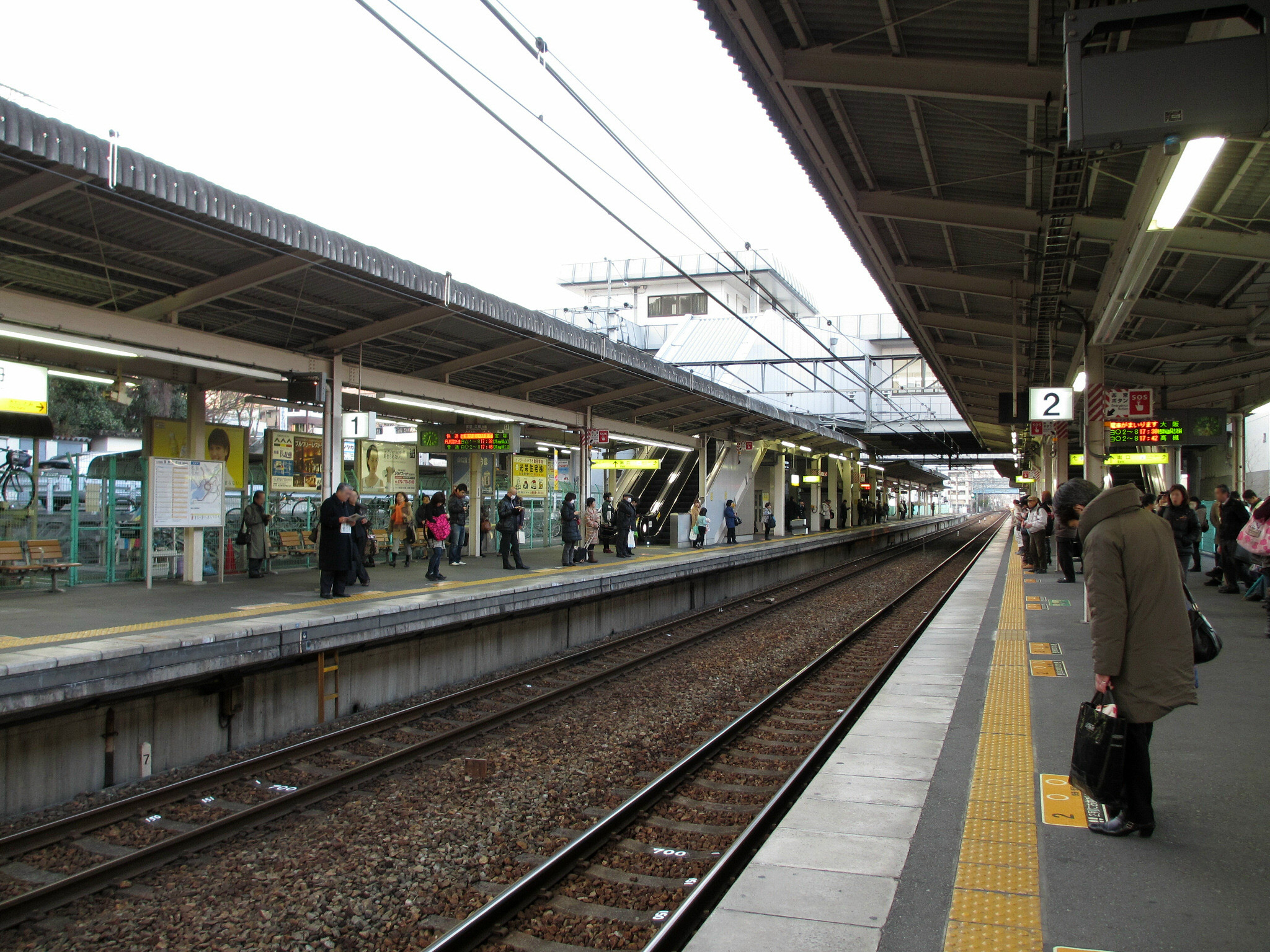
Platform

Itami Station (伊丹駅, Itami-eki) is a passenger railway station located in the city of Itami, Hyōgo Prefecture, Japan. It is operated by the West Japan Railway Company (JR West). The station is connected to a large indoor mall to the northwest by a broad pedestrian bridge. Though Hankyu Itami Station is not within easy walking distance, there is also a series of broad pedestrian streets heading in its direction.

== Lines ==
Itami Station is served by the Fukuchiyama Line (JR Takarazuka Line), and is located 5.8 kilometers from the terminus of the line at Amagasaki and 13.5 kilometers from Osaka.

== Station layout ==
The station consists of two side platforms with two tracks slightly below grade level, connected to the station building by a footbridge. There are two depot tracks on the west side of the platform, and the last trains arriving at Takarazuka Station and the rapid trains arriving at some Shin-Sanda Station return here overnight. The station has a Midori no Madoguchi staffed ticket office.

=== Platforms ===
1	■ Fukuchiyama Line (JR Takarazuka Line)	for Takarazuka and Sanda
2	■ Fukuchiyama Line (JR Takarazuka Line)	for Amagasaki, Osaka and Kitashinchi

== Adjacent stations ==
«	Service	»
Fukuchiyama Line (JR Takarazuka Line)
Inadera	Local trains	Kita-Itami
Amagasaki	Regional Rapid Service	Kawanishi-Ikeda
Amagasaki	Rapid Service	Kawanishi-Ikeda
Amagasaki	Tambaji Rapid Service	Kawanishi-Ikeda

== History ==
The station opened on 12 December 1893 on the Settsu Railway (which merged into Hankaku Railway in 1897, was nationalized as part of Japanese National Railways in 1907, and was renamed from the Hankaku Line to the Fukuchiyama Line in 1912).

In 1989, JR West announced plans for a new line connecting the station to Itami Airport, but the plan has been on hold since the mid-2000s. Hyogo Prefecture later considered constructing a light rail system to connect the station to the airport.

The station ceased railway operations for 55 days in 2005 following the Amagasaki derailment (which during the day of the accident, the train involved in the accident overshot the platform).

Station numbering was introduced in March 2018 with Itami being assigned station number JR-G52.

== Passenger statistics ==
In fiscal 2016, the station was used by an average of 24,285 passengers daily

== Surrounding area ==
- Aeon Mall Itami
- Toyo Tire head office
- Itami City Museum of Art

== See also ==
- List of railway stations in Japan
