= Kawanishi, Hyōgo =

Kawanishi 川西市
- City
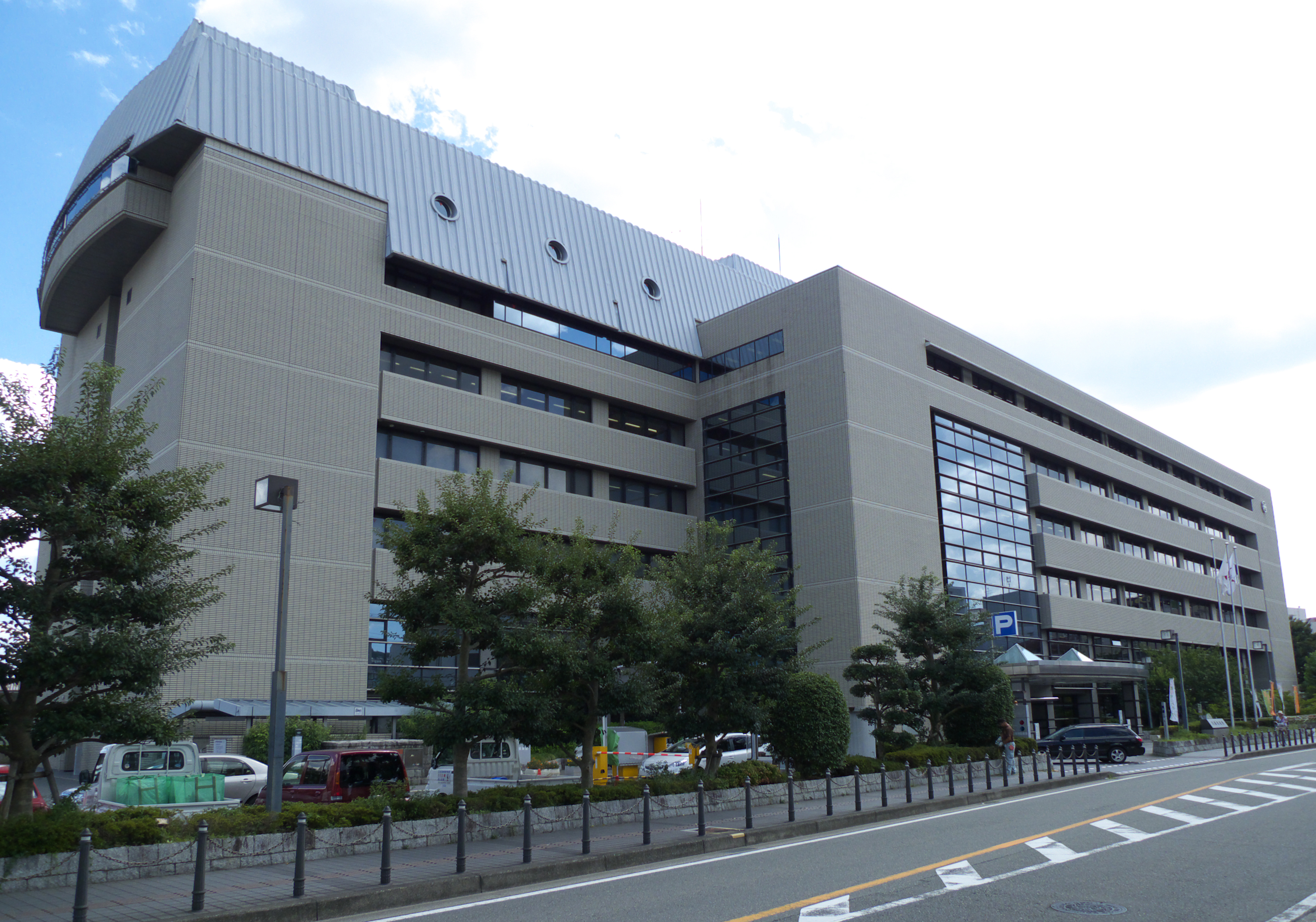
- Kawanishi City Hall

- Flag Emblem
- Interactive map of Kawanishi
- Location in Japan
- Coordinates: 34°50′N 135°25′E
- Country: Japan
- Region: Kansai
- Prefecture: Hyōgo

Government
  - Mayor: Tamio Oshio

Area
  - Total: 53.44 km^{2} (20.63 sq mi)

Population (September 30, 2022)
  - Total: 155,165
  - Density: 2,904/km^{2} (7,520/sq mi)
- Time zone: UTC+09:00 (JST)
- City hall address: 12-1 Chūō-chō, Kawanishi-shi, Hyōgo-ken 666-8501
- Website: Official website
- Symbols
- Flower: Gentian
- Tree: Sakura

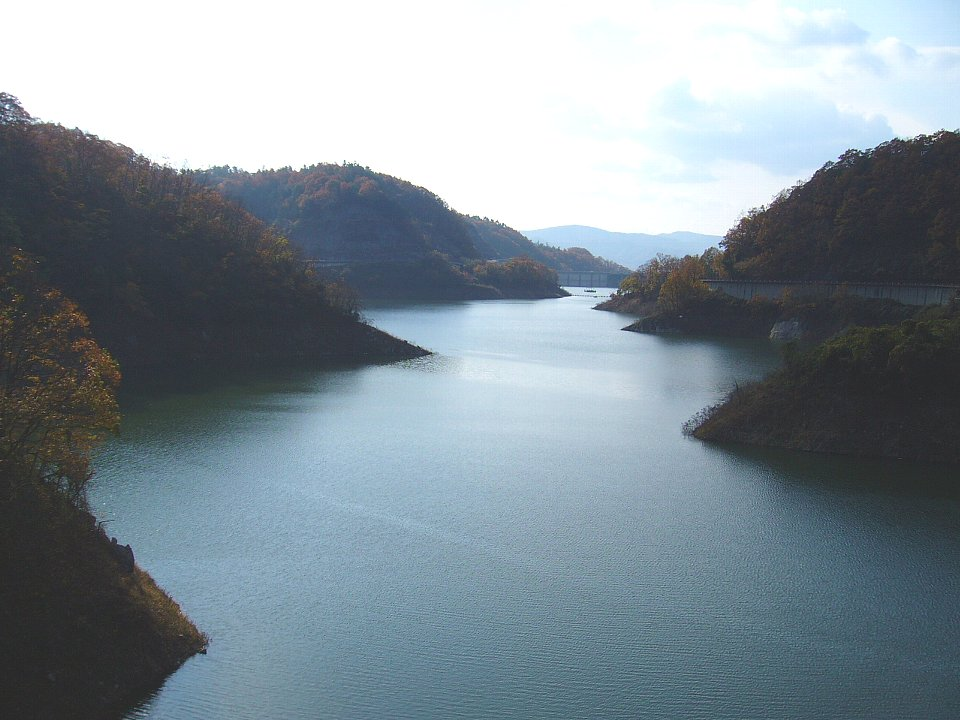
Lake Chimyo

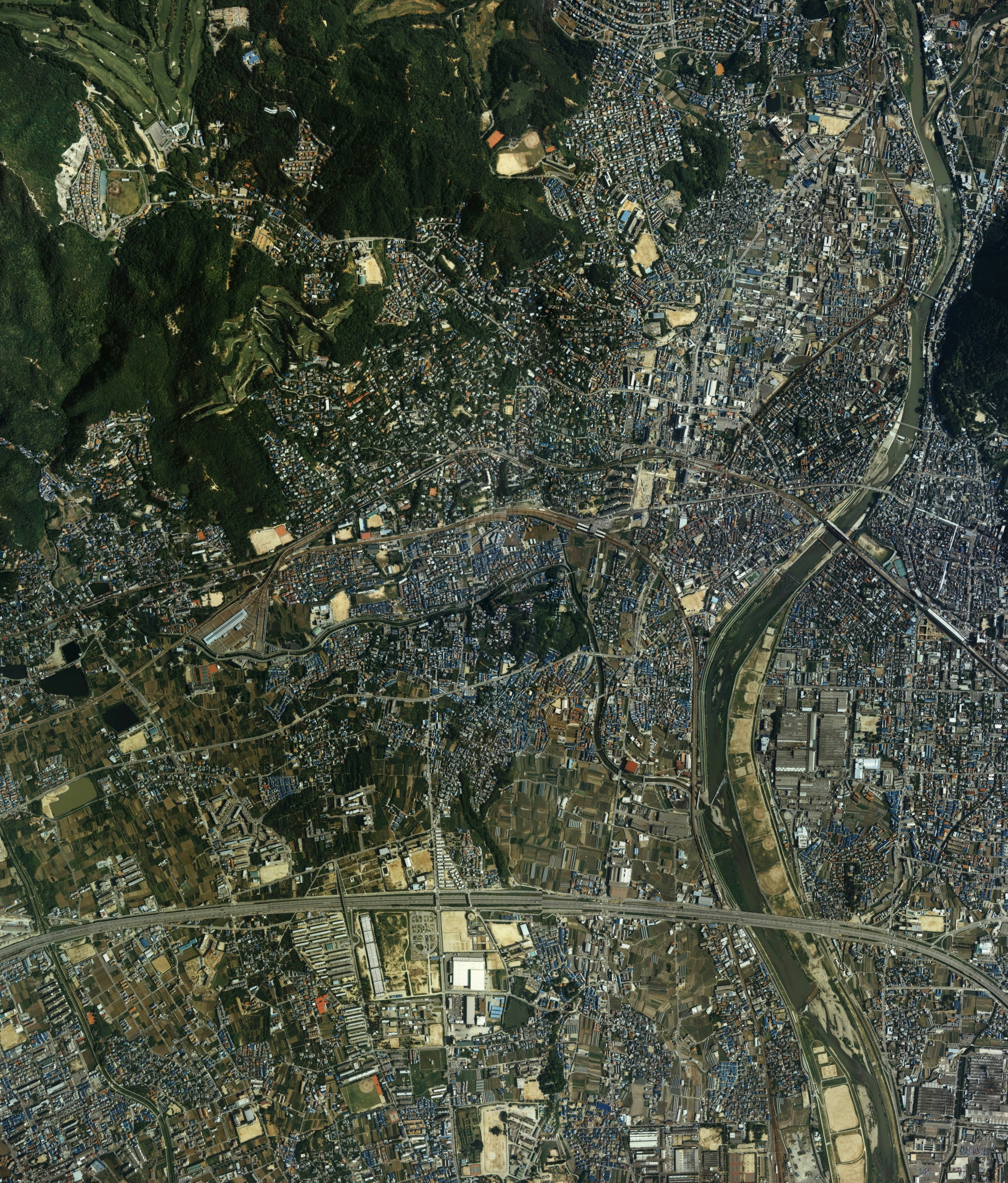
Aerial view of Kawanishi city center

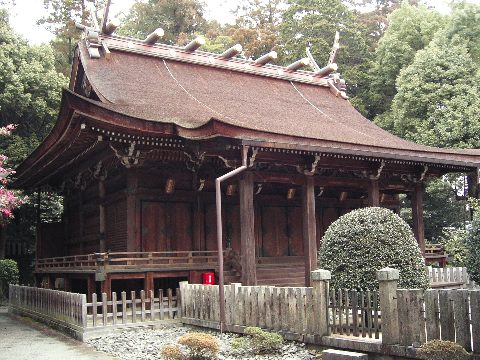
Tada-in

Kawanishi (川西市, Kawanishi-shi) is a city located in Hyōgo Prefecture, Japan. As of 30 September 2022, the city had an estimated population of 155,165 and a population density of 2900 persons per km^{2}. The total area of the city is 53.44 square kilometres (20.63 sq mi).

== Geography ==
Kawanishi is located in far eastern Hyōgo Prefecture, about 5 km north of Osaka Itami Airport. It is bordered on the west by the Inagawa river.

=== Neighbouring municipalities ===
Hyōgo Prefecture

- Inagawa
- Itami
- Takarazuka

Osaka Prefecture

- Ikeda
- Minoh
- Nose
- Toyono

=== Climate ===
Kawanishi has a humid subtropical climate (Köppen Cfa) characterized by warm summers and cool winters with light snowfall. The average annual temperature in Kawanishi is 14.0 °C. The average annual rainfall is 14759 mm with September as the wettest month. The temperatures are highest on average in July, at around 25.8 °C, and lowest in January, at around 2.6 °C.

== Demographics ==
Per Japanese census data, the population of Kawanishi has been increasing steadily since the 1920s.

Historical population
Year	Pop.	±%
1920	13,951	—
1930	17,039	+22.1%
1940	22,411	+31.5%
1950	32,555	+45.3%
1960	41,916	+28.8%
1970	87,127	+107.9%
1980	129,834	+49.0%
1990	141,253	+8.8%
2000	153,763	+8.9%
2010	156,476	+1.8%

== History ==
The area of Kawanishi was part of ancient Kawabe District of Settsu Province and has been inhabited since ancient times, with the traces of a Yayoi period settlement many kofun burial mounds found within the city limits. From the Heian period, the Tada-in was a sacred site for the Seiwa Genji clan after Minamoto no Mitsunaka, a grandson of Emperor Seiwa retired to this area. From the 11th century, the Tada Silver Mine, which produced silver and copper, started. It reached peak production the 17th century, which is why this area was tenryō territory under the direct administration of the Tokugawa shogunate in the Edo period. The village of Kawanishi was established on April 1, 1889 with the creation of the modern municipalities system. It was elevated to town status on October 1, 1925. On August 1, 1954 it merged with the villages of Higashitani (東谷村) and Tada (多田村) to become the city of Kawanishi.

== Government ==
Kawanishi has a mayor-council form of government with a directly elected mayor and a unicameral city council of 26 members. Kawanishi contributes three members to the Hyōgo Prefectural Assembly. In terms of national politics, the city is divided between the Hyōgo th district and Hyōgo 6th districts of the lower house of the Diet of Japan.

== Economy ==
In 1884, Mitsubishi established Japan's first noted water plant in Kawanishi, this later became Mitsuya Cider. At present, Kawanishi is a commuter town for workers in Kobe and Osaka, with express trains running from Osaka to Kawanishi to accommodate these travelers. Though primarily suburban, Kawanishi does have a significant agricultural sector, especially in the northern portions of the city. Major crops include peaches, chestnuts, figs, and charcoal.

== Education ==
Kawanishi has 16 public elementary schools and eight public middle schools operated by the city government, and four public high schools operated by the Hyōgo Prefectural Board of Education. In addition, the city also operates one special education school for the handicapped. The Toyo College of Food Technology, a junior college, is located in the city

== Transportation ==
=== Railways ===
Kawanishi is serviced by the JR Takarazuka Line and the Hankyu Takarazuka Line. Hankyu's Kawanishi-Noseguchi Station is a transfer station to the Nose Railway, which runs primarily within Kawanishi.

Hankyu - Takarazuka Line

- Kawanishi-Noseguchi

JR West - Fukuchiyama Line

- Kawanishi-Ikeda

Nose Electric Railway - Myōken Line

- Kawanishi-noseguchi - Kinunobebashi - Takiyama - Uguisunomori - Tsuzumigataki - Tada - Hirano - Ichinotorii - Uneno - Yamashita - Sasabe

Nose Electric Railway - Nissei Line

- Yamashita

=== Highways ===
- Shin-Meishin Expressway Kawanishi Interchange
- Chūgoku Expressway
- Hanshin Expressway Ikeda Route
  - National Route 173
  - National Route 176
  - National Route 477

== Sister cities ==
- Sawara, Chiba, Japan, since 1990

== Local attractions ==
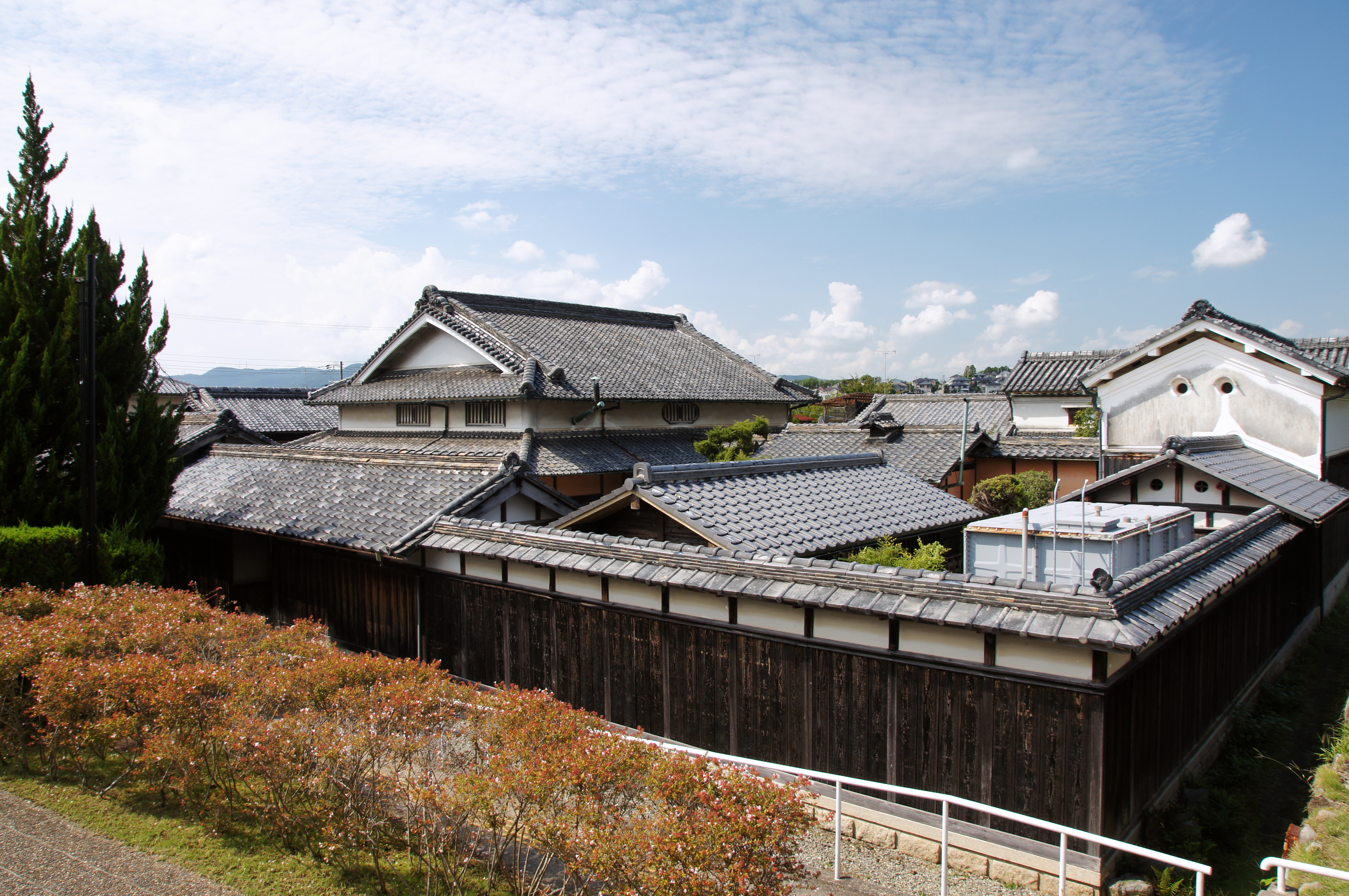
Kyodokan Museum (Folk Museum of Kawanishi)

- Folk Museum of Kawanishi
- Hitokura Dam and Lake Chimyo
- Inagawa Keikoku Prefectural Natural Park
- Kamo Site, National Historic Monument
- Mangan-ji, Buddhist temple
- Shinden Castle ruins
- Shofukuji Kofun
- Tada-in
- Yamashita Castle ruins

== Notable people from Kawanishi ==
- Atsuya Furuta
- Haruna Hosoya
- Masafumi Kawaguchi
- Hideo Kojima
- Miyavi
- Hiroyuki Noritake
- Wakakirin Shinichi
- Kana Uemura
- Kaoru Yumi
