= Tada Silver and Copper Mine =

Former mine in Japan

Coordinates: 34°53′43.69″N 135°21′2.61″E

- Tada Silver and Copper Mine Tada Silver and Copper Mine (Japan)
- Location: Hyōgo Prefecture, Japan
- Products: silver, copper
- Opened: Nara period
- Closed: 1972
- National Historic Site of Japan

The Tada Silver and Copper Mine (多田銀銅山遺, Tada gindōzan) was once a silver and copper mine located in the town of Inagawa, Hyōgo, in the Kansai region of Japan. The main ores were chalcopyrite, bornite, galena, molybdenite and native silver from veins which originated from hydrothermal deposits. The mine closed in 1972, and in 2015, it was designated as a National Historic Site.

== History ==
The Tada Silver and Copper Mine is a general term for a vein extending over ten square kilometers in the Hokusetsu mountain range, southeast of the Chugoku Mountains, about 20 kilometers north of the center of the Osaka Plain. According to folklore, copper mining began when copper was donated for the construction of the Great Buddha Tōdai-ji in the Nara period. It is believed that this original copper mine was located in what is now part of the city of Nose, Osaka, and that mining was carried out by employing local residents who were supplied with materials by the government office of Settsu Province. However, there is little documentary record to backup this claim. During the Heian period, Minamoto no Mitsunaka built a residence at Tada Shrine and the surrounding area was part of his estate. Reliable records of copper production date back to 1037, when the Nose copper mine was established. From 1279, the farmers of the nearby public territories and manors were organized to secure labor, so that the copper mines had control over the surrounding villages. During the Nanboku-chō period, the mining was under the control of the Otsuki clan, a lower-ranking government official, but the mines were fought over by neighboring samurai groups, including troops from the shugo (nominal provincial governor), the Nose clan, and the Shiokawa clan, who were retainers of the Tada Shrine. During the Tenshō era Toyotomi Hideyoshi redeveloped the mine in its current Inagawa town area. However, in 1598 it is recorded that only 476 silver coins (approximately 76 kilograms) were produced by the mine, which is several orders of magnitude smaller than the Ikuno Silver Mine, which produced 62,267 (10 tons) in the same year. There is an urban legend that Hideyoshi hid knowledge of a rich ore vein as a reserve, but there is no historical corroboration.

In 1660, full-scale mining operations began with the discovery of a good ore vein with a high silver content. This led the Tokugawa shogunate to take direct control of the mine in 1661. Production peaked in around the end of the Kanbun era (1662-1670), with output reaching 5.6 tons of silver and 420 tons of copper. Afterwards mining became increasingly difficult due to large amounts of spring water and production dropped. The mine was transferred to the control of Takatsuki Domain in 1840. Smaller scale production by local villages, which had existed since the Nara period, continued the end of the Edo Period. The magistrate's office which controlled in mine and mining villages was abolished in 1869. The mine was purchased by Mitsubishi in 1895 and production methods were modernized. Due to a sudden drop in silver and copper prices that began in the autumn of 1907, it closed in 1908. The mine was reopened in 1944 by Japan Mining, and closed again in 1973.

The Tada Silver and Copper Mine Museum of Eternity (多田銀銅山 悠久の館, Tada gin dōzan yūkyūnoyakata) was opened in 2007 to introduce the history of the Tada Silver and Copper Mine.

== See also ==
- List of Historic Sites of Japan (Hyōgo)
