= Sakuradani Light Railway =

Railway in Osaka, Japan

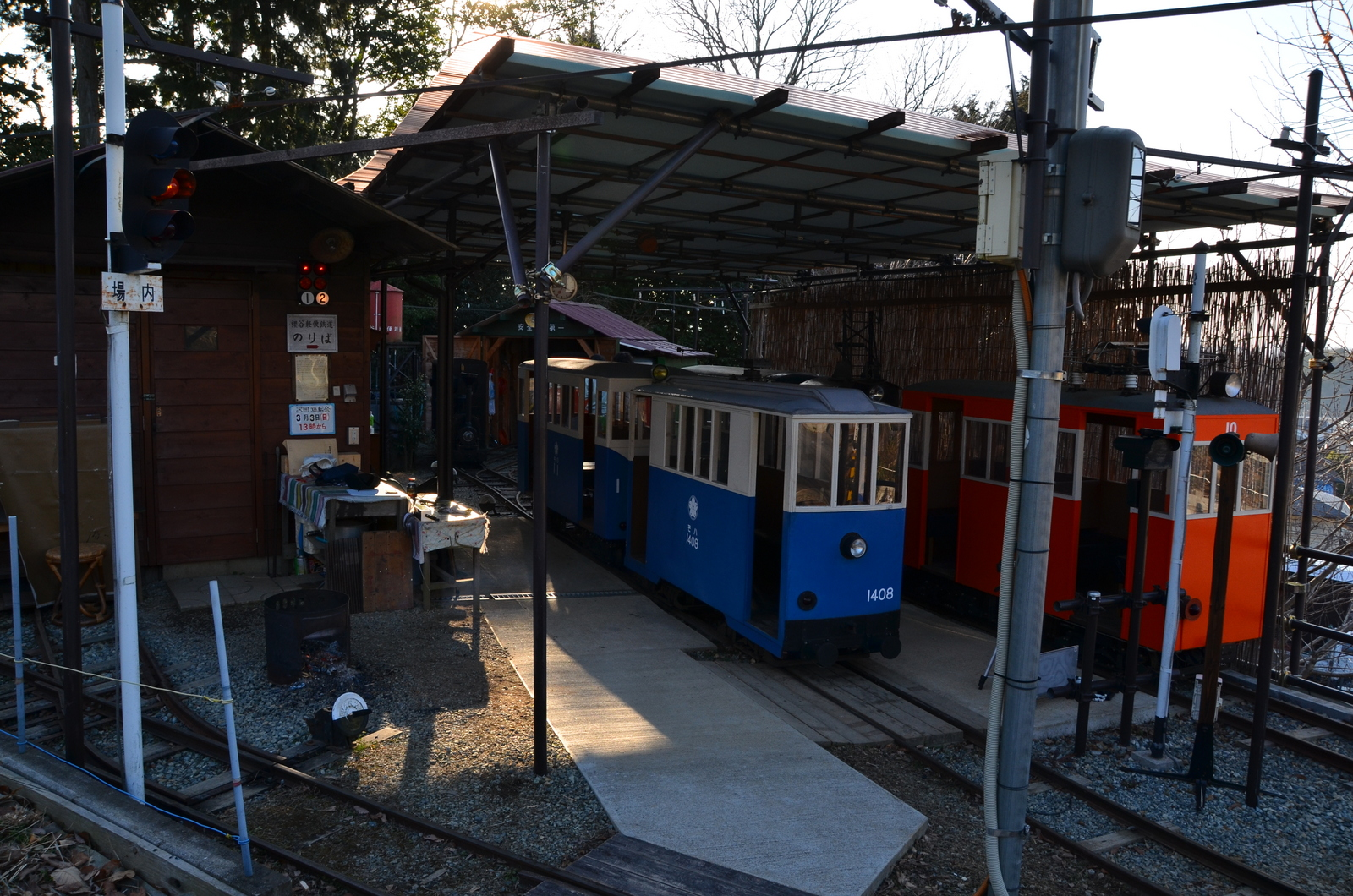
Kaze-No-Toge Station on the Sakuradani Light Railway in February 2013, with electric cars 1408 and 10 visible

The Sakuradani Light Railway (桜谷軽便鉄道, Sakuradani Keiben Tetsudō) is a privately owned, ridable 15 in (381 mm) gauge electric garden railway in the Toyono District of Osaka Prefecture, Japan.

The Sakuradani Light Railway was built as a hobby by Setsuo Mochimoto (持元節夫), who had been interested in model trains since his childhood, but started building a full-size railway in the 1990s. Visitors are allowed to drive the trains. The 150 metres (490 ft) long loop of the Minamiyama Line stops at the single-track platform of Sakuradani Station (桜谷駅) and the double-track platform of Kaze-No-Tōge Station (風の峠駅). In total, the track has 13 switches. An overhead line is used to transmit electricity at 36 volts DC to trams and locomotives. The shorter Lower Line, which is not connected to the Minamiyama Line, runs at a lower level and has a length of 165 feet (50 m).

The railway opens to the public on the afternoon on the first Sunday every month. It is named after a mine that was once located there.

== Rolling stock ==
As of August 2015, the following rolling stock is used on the line.

Number	Type	Date built	Power output	Livery	Remarks
16	Flat wagon	July 1996	-		
2	Battery locomotive	May 1997	100 W	Yellow	
7	Battery locomotive	May 2000	116 W	Black	Built to resemble a steam locomotive.
8	Steam locomotive	November 2000	0.2 hp	Black	
301	Passenger coach	December 2001	-	Brown & cream	
DeKi 12	Electric locomotive	January 2004	232 W	Black	Built to resemble a Kusagaru Electric Railway locomotive.
150	Passenger coach	July 2004	-	Vermillion & cream	
HoTo 71	Open wagon	November 2004	-	Black	Built to resemble a Kusagaru Electric Railway wagon.
MoHa 1408	Electric car	May 2005	220 W	Blue & cream	Built to resemble an Akiu Electric Railway car.
DeKi 3	Electric locomotive	July 2006	270 W	Dark green	Steeple-cab type.
201	Passenger coach	July 2008	-	Blue & cream	
OHa 7	Passenger coach	December 2009	-	Green & cream	
10	Electric car	August 2011	600 W	Vermillion & cream	Built to resemble a Ueda Electric Railway car.
KiHa D11	Gasoline-driven car	June 2012	300 W	Blue & cream	Built to resemble a Shizuoka Railway car.
ED51	Electric locomotive	April 2013	600 W	Maroon	
OHa 8	Passenger coach	November 2013	-	Green & cream	Rebuilt from KiHa 3.
-	Handcar	August 2015	-	Green & cream	
