= Kawanishi-Ikeda Station =

Railway station in Kawanishi, Hyōgo Prefecture, Japan

Kawanishi-Ikeda Station 川西池田駅
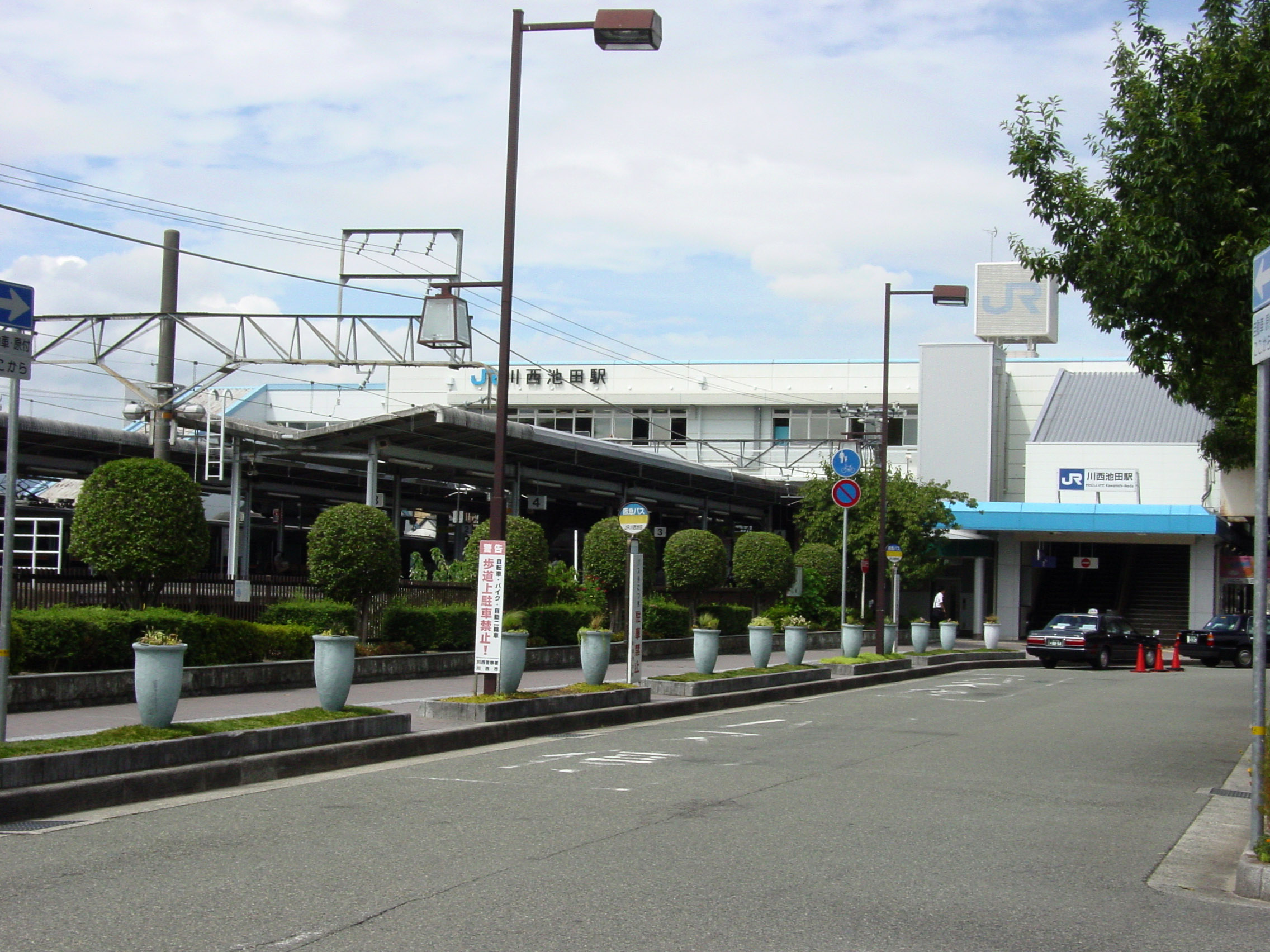
- Kawanishi-Ikeda Station in September 2010

General information
- Location: 2-chōme-7 Sakane, Kawanishi-shi, Hyōgo-ken 666-0021; Japan
- Coordinates: 34°49′39.5″N 135°24′48.23″E
- Owner: West Japan Railway Company
- Operator: West Japan Railway Company
- Lines: Fukuchiyama Line (JR Takarazuka Line)
- Distance: 11.0 km (6.8 miles) from Amagasaki
- Platforms: 2 island platforms
- Connections: Bus stop; Hankyu Railway; Nose Railway

Construction
- Structure type: Ground level
- Accessible: None

Other information
- Status: Staffed (Midori no Madoguchi )
- Station code: JR-G54
- Website: Official website

History
- Opened: 12 December 1893
- Former names: Ikeda (to 1951)

Passengers
- FY2024: 33596 daily
Location
- Location within Hyōgo Prefecture Location within Japan

Kawanishi-Ikeda Station (川西池田駅, Kawanishi-Ikeda-eki) is a passenger railway station located in the city of Kawanishi, Hyōgo Prefecture, Japan. It is operated by the West Japan Railway Company (JR West). There is a transfer at this station for Kawanishi-Noseguchi Station.

== Lines ==
Kawanishi-Ikeda Station is served by the Fukuchiyama Line (JR Takarazuka Line), and is located 11.0 kilometers from the terminus of the line at Amagasaki and 18.7 kilometers from Osaka.

== Station layout ==
The station consists of two ground-level island platforms serving four tracks, connected by an elevated station building. The station has a Reserved-seat ticket vending machine plus.

=== Platforms ===
1, 2	■ Fukuchiyama Line (JR Takarazuka Line)	for Takarazuka and Sanda
3, 4	■ Fukuchiyama Line (JR Takarazuka Line)	for Amagasaki, Osaka and Kitashinchi

== Adjacent stations ==
«	Service	»
JR West
Fukuchiyama Line (JR Takarazuka Line)
Kita-Itami	Local trains	Nakayamadera
Itami	Regional Rapid Service	Nakayamadera
Itami	Rapid Service	Nakayamadera
Itami	Tambaji Rapid Service	Nakayamadera

== History ==
Kawanishi-Ikeda Station opened on 12 December 1893, as Ikeda Station (池田駅) of the Hankaku Railway, which was nationalized in 1907. It was renamed to its present name on 1 August 1951. With the privatization of the Japan National Railways (JNR) on 1 April 1987, the station came under the aegis of the West Japan Railway Company.

Station numbering was introduced in March 2018 with Kawanishi-Ikeda being assigned station number JR-G54.

== Passenger statistics ==
In fiscal 2016, the station was used by an average of 19,771 passengers daily

== Surrounding area ==
- Kawanishi-Noseguchi Station (Hankyu Takarazuka Main Line/Nose Electric Railway Myoken Line)
- Kawanishi City Central Library
- Toyo College of Food Technology
- Kawanishi Municipal Kawanishi Elementary School

== See also ==
- List of railway stations in Japan
