= Toyono, Osaka =

Toyono 豊能町
- Town
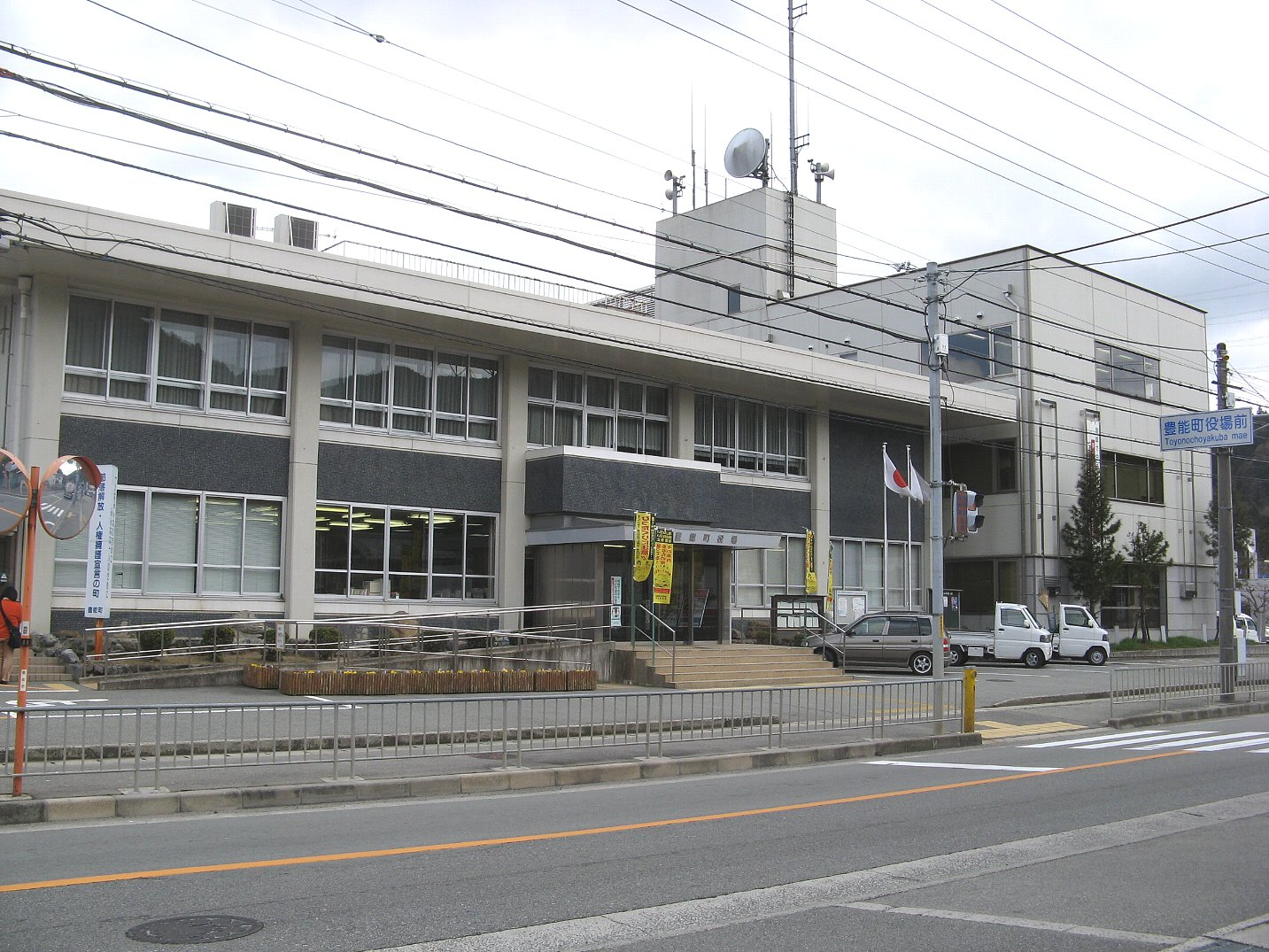
- Toyono town office

- Flag Emblem
- Location of Toyono in Osaka Prefecture

- Location in Japan
- Coordinates: 34°55′08″N 135°29′39″E
- Country: Japan
- Region: Kansai; Kinki
- Prefecture: Osaka
- District: Toyono

Government
  - Mayor: Ryuichi Tanaka

Area
  - Total: 34.34 km^{2} (13.26 sq mi)

Population (March 31, 2023)
  - Total: 18,377
  - Density: 535.1/km^{2} (1,386/sq mi)
- Time zone: UTC+09:00 (JST)
- City hall address: 414-1 Yono, Toyono-chō, Toyono-gun, Osaka-fu 563-0292
- Website: Official website
- Symbols
- Bird: Japanese bush-warbler
- Flower: Dandelion
- Tree: Cryptomeria

Toyono (豊能町, Toyono-chō) is a town situated in Toyono District, Osaka Prefecture, Japan. As of 31 March 2023, the town had an estimated population of 18,377 in 8,675 households and a population density of 540 persons per km^{2}. The total area of the town is 34.34 square kilometres (13.26 sq mi).

== Geography ==
Toyono is located in the northernmost tip of Osaka Prefecture, surrounded by mountains, at the point of contact between Kyoto Prefecture and Kawanishi, Hyōgo. It is also called 'Osaka's Karuizawa' along with neighboring Nose due to its high elevation. Elevations range from 400 to 600 meters in the east and southeast to 300 meters in the west .The town area is divided into west and east areas by the Mount Myōken massif (660 meters) and the is no road between the west and east districts within the town borders. The main urban concentration is in the west, with train and road connections to Kawanishi and Osaka.

=== Adjoining municipalities ===
Kyoto Prefecture

- Kameoka

Hyōgo Prefecture

- Kawanishi

Osaka Prefecture

- Ibaraki
- Minoh
- Nose

== Climate ==
Toyono has a humid subtropical climate (Köppen Cfa) characterized by warm summers and cool winters with moderate snowfall. The average annual temperature in Toyono is 14.0 °C. The average annual rainfall is 1690 mm with September as the wettest month. The highest average temperature is in August, 25.9 °C, and lowest in January, 2.6 °C.

== Demography ==
Per Japanese census data, the population of Toyono has been as follows.

Historical population
Year	Pop.	±%
1960	3,758	—
1970	4,930	+31.2%
1980	12,471	+153.0%
1990	23,676	+89.8%
2000	25,722	+8.6%
2010	21,976	−14.6%

== History ==
The area of Toyono was part on ancient Settsu Province, and Nose District was separated from Kawabe District in 713 AD. During the Edo period, it was largely tenryō territory under the direct control of the Tokugawa shogunate. Toyono is the origin of a cultivar of Japanese chestnut called Ginyose that is resistant to the chestnut gall wasp - it is believed to have derived from a chance chestnut seedling found in Toyono in 1750. Following the Meiji restoration, Nose District and Teshima District were merged to form Toyono District, Osaka and the area was divided into villages with the creation of the modern municipalities system on April 1, 1889. including the village of Higashinose (東能勢村). Higashinose was elevated to town status on April 1, 1977 and renamed Toyono.

== Government ==
Toyono has a mayor-council form of government with a directly elected mayor and a unicameral Nose council of 12 members. Toyono, collectively with the town of Nose and city of Minoh, contributes one member to the Osaka Prefectural Assembly. In terms of national politics, the town is part of the Osaka 9th district of the lower house of the Diet of Japan.

=== Neighborhoods (by zip code) ===
==== West ====
- Yoshikawa 563-0101
- Tokiwadai 563-0102
- Higashi-Tokiwadai 563-0103
- Kofudai 563-0104
- Shinkofudai 563-0105
- Honotani 563-0100

==== East ====
- Yono 563-0219
- Nomaguchi 563-0218
- Maki 563-0211
- Kirihata 563-0213
- Terada 563-0212
- Kawashiri 563-0217
- Kishiro 563-0215
- Kibogaoka 563-0214

==== Southeast ====
- Takayama 563-0216

== Economy ==
Forestry, agriculture, and food processing are the main industries in Toyono, but material storage sites and industrial waste disposal sites are also present in the east, whereas the west is increasing a commuter town for the Greater Osaka metropolitan area.

== Education ==
Toyono has four public elementary schools and two public junior high schools operated by the town government. The town does not have a high school.

== Transportation ==
=== Railway ===
Nose Electric Railway - Myōken Line

- Kōfūdai - Tokiwadai - Myōkenguchi

=== Highways ===
- Shin-Meishin Expressway
- National Route 423
- National Route 477
