= Hitokura Dam =

Dam in Hyōgo, Japan

Coordinates: 34°54′19″N 135°24′42″E

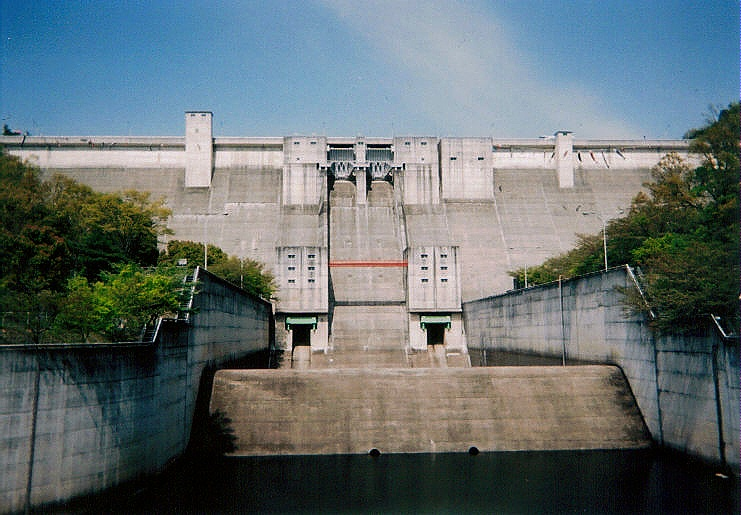
- Interactive map of Hitokura Dam
- Location: Kawanishi, Hyōgo, Japan.
- Construction began: 1968
- Opening date: 1983

Dam and spillways
- Impounds: Hitokuraoroji River
- Height: 75 m
- Length: 285 m

Reservoir
- Total capacity: 33,300,000 m^{3}
- Catchment area: 115.1 km^{2}
- Surface area: 105 hectares

Hitokura Dam (一庫ダム, Hitokura damu) is a dam in Kawanishi, Hyōgo Prefecture, Japan.
