= Kita-Itami Station =

Railway station in Itami, Hyōgo Prefecture, Japan

Kita-Itami Station 北伊丹駅
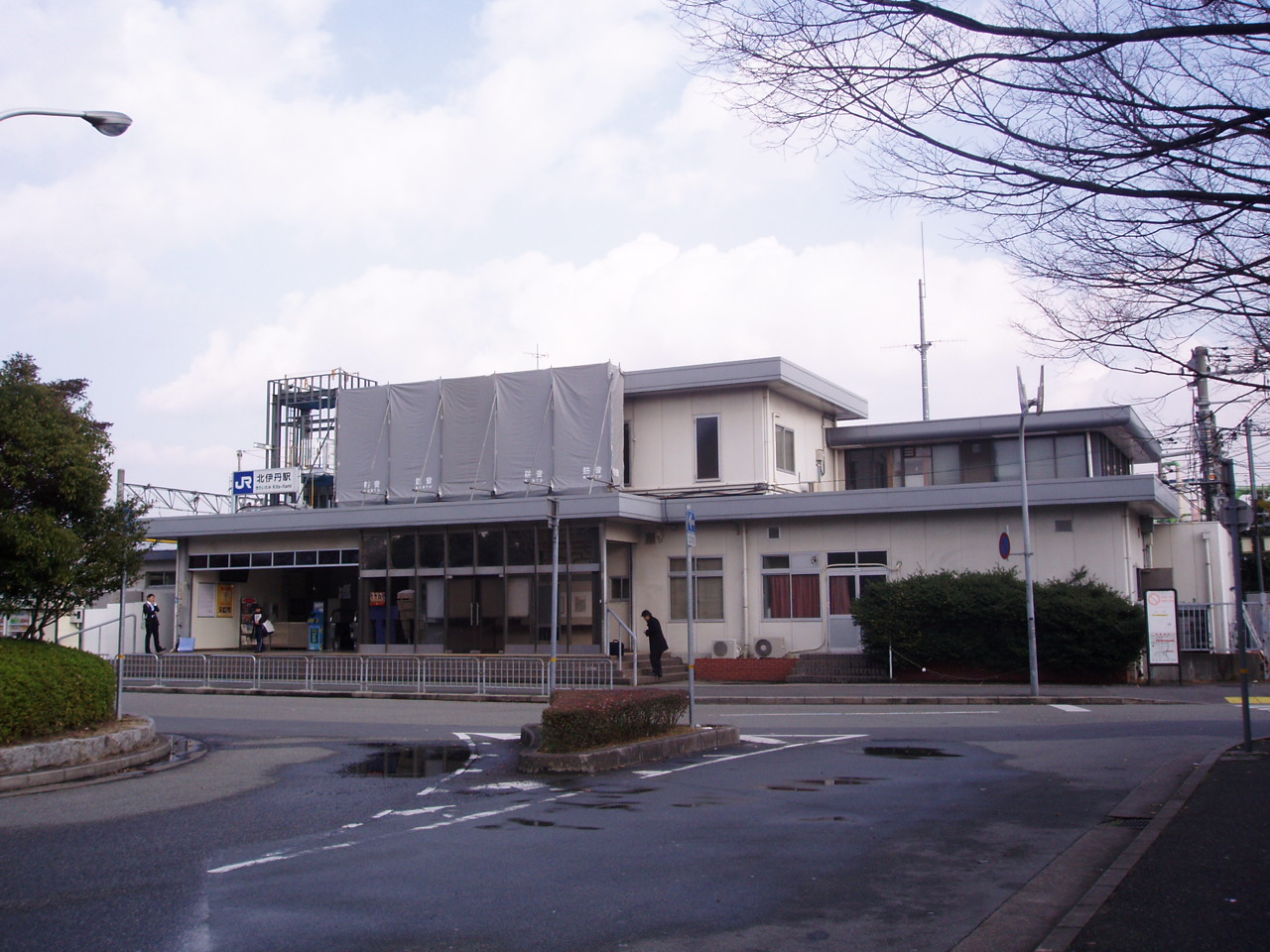
- Kita-Itami Station

General information
- Location: 9 Chome Kitaitami, Itami-shi, Hyōgo-ken 664-0831; Japan
- Coordinates: 34°48′4.88″N 135°25′9.65″E
- Owner: West Japan Railway Company
- Operator: West Japan Railway Company
- Lines: Fukuchiyama Line (JR Takarazuka Line)
- Distance: 7.9 km (4.9 miles) from Amagasaki
- Platforms: 1 island platform
- Connections: Bus stop

Construction
- Structure type: Ground level
- Accessible: Yes

Other information
- Status: Staffed
- Station code: JR-G53
- Website: Official website

History
- Opened: 1 April 1944

Passengers
- FY2016: 1159 daily
Location
- Location within Hyōgo Prefecture Location within Japan

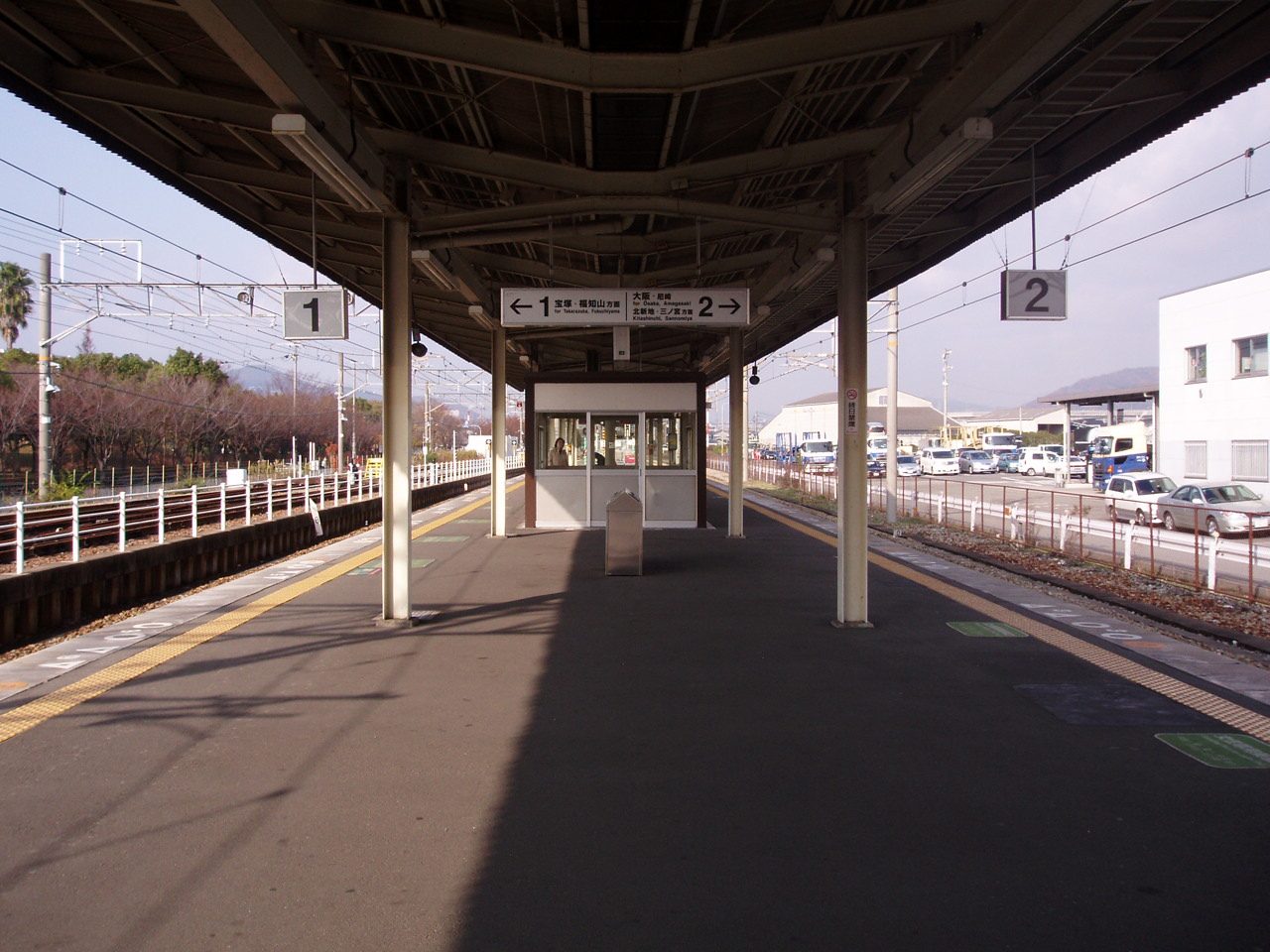
Platform

Kita-Itami Station (北伊丹駅, Kita-Itami-eki) is a passenger railway station located in the city of Itami, Hyōgo Prefecture, Japan. It is operated by the West Japan Railway Company (JR West).

== Lines ==
Kita-Itami Station is served by the Fukuchiyama Line (JR Takarazuka Line), and is located 7.9 kilometers from the terminus of the line at Amagasaki and 15.6 kilometers from Osaka.

== Station layout ==
The station consists of one ground-level island platform serving two tracks, connected to the station building by a footbridge. There are two depot tracks on the west side of the platform, and the last trains arriving at Takarazuka Station and the rapid trains arriving at some Shin-Sanda Station return here overnight. The station has a staffed ticket office.

=== Platforms ===
1	■ Fukuchiyama Line (JR Takarazuka Line)	for Takarazuka and Sanda
2	■ Fukuchiyama Line (JR Takarazuka Line)	for Amagasaki, Osaka and Kitashinchi

== Adjacent stations ==
«	Service	»
Fukuchiyama Line (JR Takarazuka Line)
Itami	Local trains	Kawanishi-Ikeda
Regional Rapid Service: Does not stop at this station
Rapid Service: Does not stop at this station
Tambaji Rapid Service: Does not stop at this station

== History ==
Kita-Itami Station opened on 1 April 1944. With the privatization of the Japan National Railways (JNR) on 1 April 1987, the station came under the aegis of the West Japan Railway Company.

Station numbering was introduced in March 2018 with Kita-Itami being assigned station number JR-G53.

== Passenger statistics ==
In fiscal 2016, the station was used by an average of 5370 passengers daily

== Surrounding area ==
The station is located about 600 m north-west from the runway of Osaka International Airport, thus there is a board to notice that it is very hard to tell passengers when trains arrive at the station due to the jet engine sounds of the planes taking off and landing at the airport.

- Hyogo Prefectural Nishiina Park
- Itami Municipal Roller Skating Rink
- Japan Ground Self-Defense Force Itami Garrison

== See also ==
- List of railway stations in Japan
