= Gate Tower Building =

Building in Fukushima-ku, Osaka

- ゲートタワービル
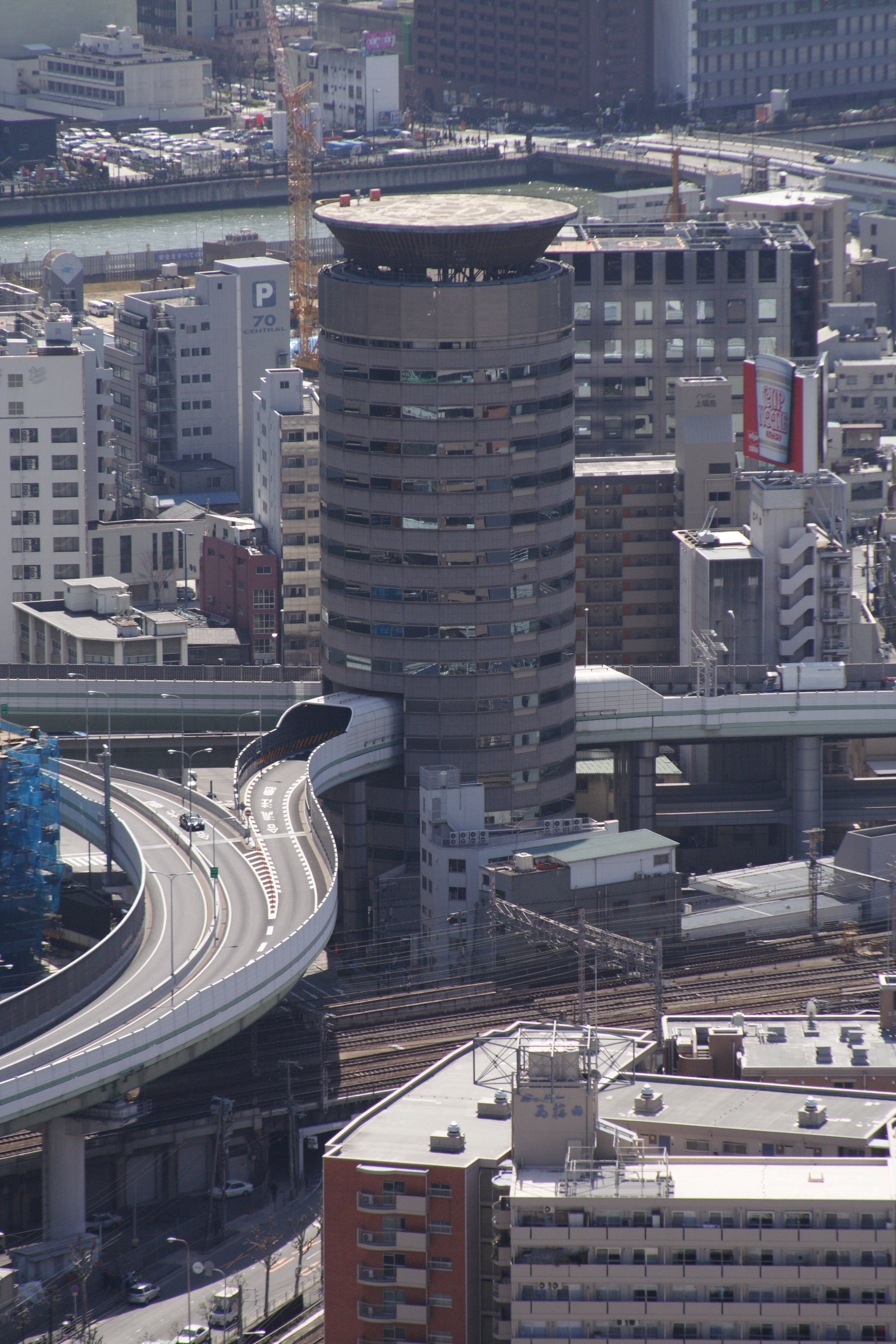

- Location within Japan

General information
- Type: Office building
- Location: 5-4-21 Fukushima, Fukushima-ku, Osaka, Japan
- Coordinates: 34°41′53″N 135°29′22″E
- Elevation: 2 m (7 ft)
- Completed: 1992
- Client: Suezawa Sangyō Co. Ltd.

Height
- Height: 71.9 m (236 ft)

Technical details
- Structural system: Reinforced concrete and partly steel frame
- Floor count: 16 above ground, 2 underground, 1 elevator equipment tower floor
- Floor area: 7,956 m^{2} (85,640 sq ft)

Design and construction
- Architects: Azusa Sekkei, Yamamoto-Nishihara Kenchiku Sekkei Jimushō
- Main contractor: Sato Kōgyō Co. Ltd.

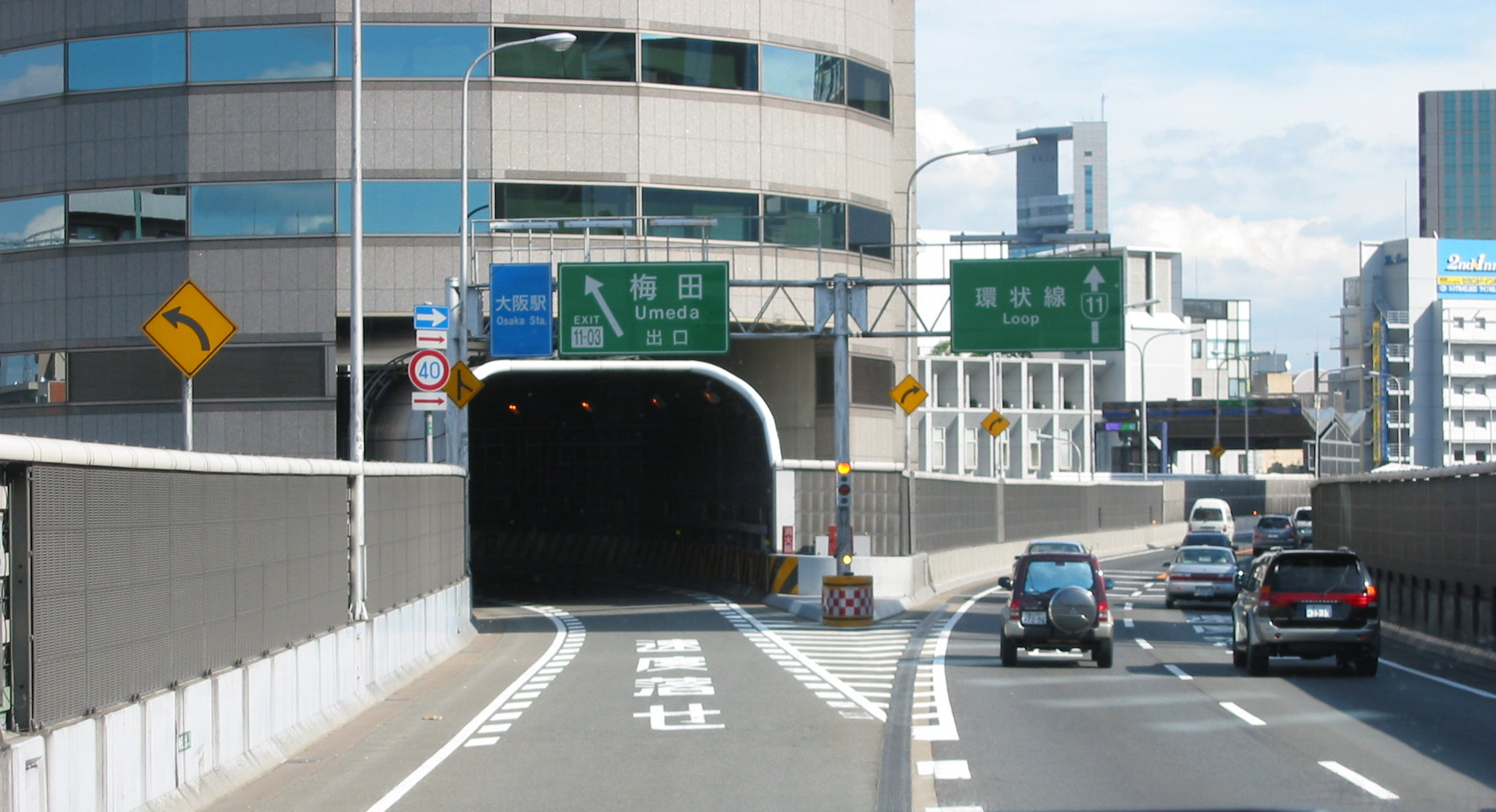
Umeda exit

The Gate Tower Building (ゲートタワービル, gēto tawā biru) is a 16-floor office building in Fukushima-ku, Osaka, Japan. It is notable for the highway offramp of the Ikeda Route that passes through the building.

== Overview ==
The building has a double core construction, with a circular cross-section. The Umeda exit of the Ikeda Route of the Hanshin Expressway system (when exiting the highway from the direction of Ikeda) passes between the fifth through seventh floors of the building. The highway is effectively the tenant of those floors. The elevator passes through the floors without stopping, with floor 4 being followed by floor 8. The floors through which the highway passes consist of elevators, stairways and machinery. The highway does not make contact with the building. It passes through as a bridge, held up by supports next to the building. The highway is surrounded by a structure to protect the building from noise and vibration. The roof has a helipad.

== History ==
A wood and charcoal business held the property rights for the plot of land since the early Meiji period, but the gradual move to other sources of fuel resulted in the deterioration of those company buildings. In 1983, redevelopment of the area was approved, but building permits were refused because the highway was already being planned. The property rights' holders refused to give up, and negotiated with the Hanshin Expressway corporation for approximately five years to reach the current solution.

Although normally highway corporations purchase the land they build a highway on or over, it is not guaranteed to succeed and therefore issues like this can arise. For that reason, the highway laws, city planning laws, city redevelopment laws and building codes were partly revised in 1989 to allow the unified development of highways and buildings in the same space. This system was originally designed to facilitate the construction of the second ring road in the vicinity of Toranomon, Minato, Tokyo, but in the end was not applied there. Instead, the system was put into effect in the construction of the Gate Tower Building, becoming Japan's first building to have a highway pass through it. Normally, highways are still built underground in these cases, and passing through a building is an extremely rare occurrence.

== See also ==
- Yau Ma Tei Car Park Building, another building with a highway running through it (now demolished)
- Liziba station, a monorail station located within a residential building
