= Inagawa, Hyōgo =

Inagawa 猪名川町
- Town
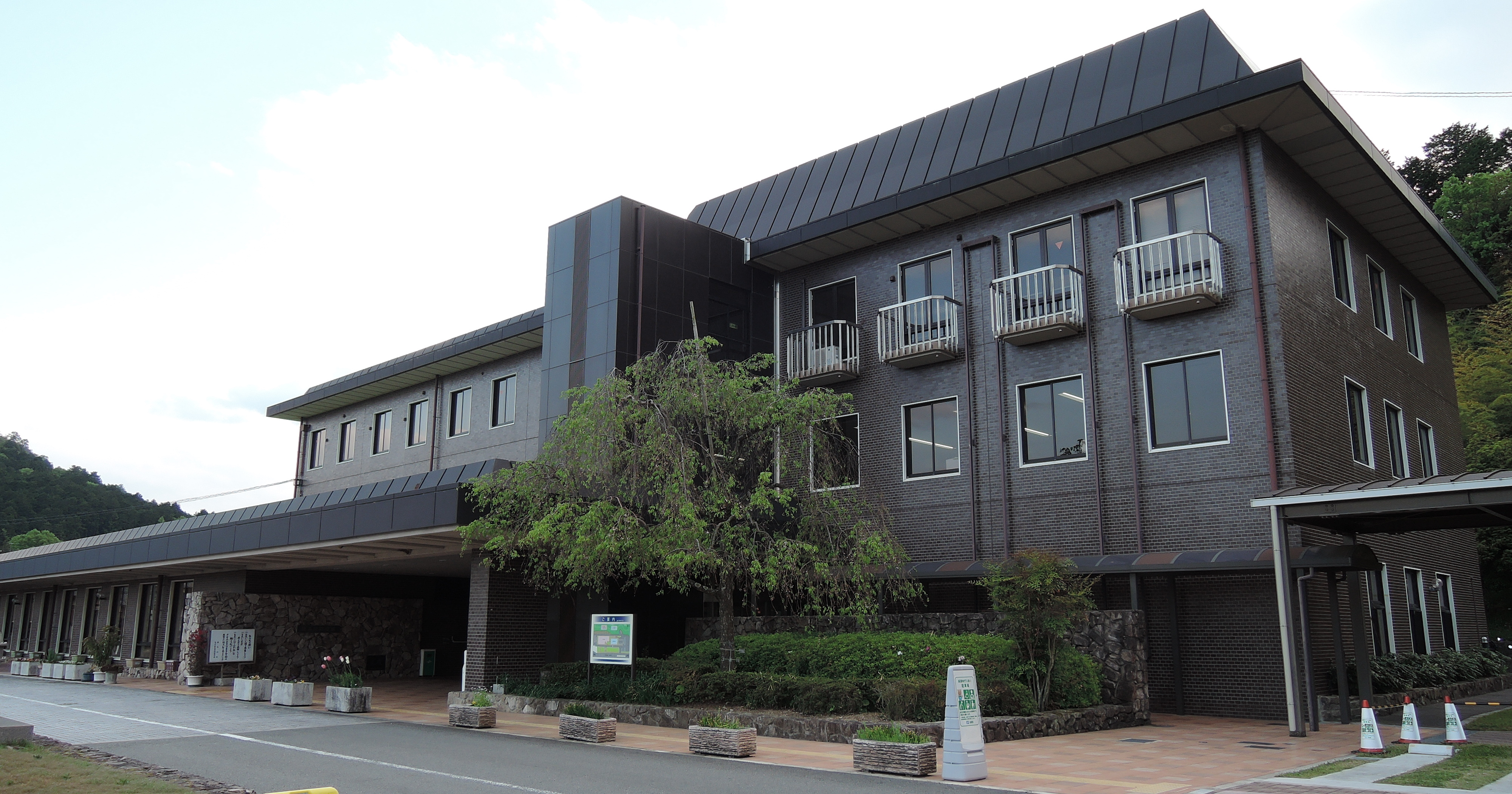
- Inagawa town hall

- Flag Emblem

- Location of Inagawa in Hyōgo Prefecture

- Location in Japan
- Coordinates: 34°54′N 135°23′E
- Country: Japan
- Region: Kansai
- Prefecture: Hyōgo
- District: Kawabe

Government
  - Mayor: Chohji Fukuda (福田長治)

Area
  - Total: 90.33 km^{2} (34.88 sq mi)

Population (November 1, 2022)
  - Total: 29,579
  - Density: 327.5/km^{2} (848.1/sq mi)
- Time zone: UTC+09:00 (JST)
- City hall address: Ueno-aza-Kitahata 11-1, Inagawa-chō, Hyōgo-ken, Japan 666-0292
- Website: Official website
- Symbols
- Flower: Azalea
- Tree: Pine

Inagawa (猪名川町, Inagawa-chō) is a town located in Kawabe District in Hyōgo Prefecture, Japan. As of 1 November 2022, the town had an estimated population of 29,579 in 12,552 households and a population density of 330 persons per km^{2}. The total area of the town is 90.33 square kilometres (34.88 sq mi).

== Geography ==
Inagawa is located in the southeastern part of Hyōgo Prefecture. Although it is a relatively short distance of 25 kilometers in a straight line from Osaka Station and Umeda Station, which are the terminal stations of the Kansai region in downtown Osaka, Inagawa retains the atmosphere of an old village with forests and rural scenery. The southern part of the town forms part of the Tada Basin, one of the prominent basins in Hyōgo Prefecture that continues into neighboring Kawanishi. A lot of nature remains in the northern part, and firefly, Japanese giant salamander and forest tree frogs inhabit. In addition, the Inagawa Astronomical Observatory Astropia is located within the Ono Alpsland, the area around the summit of Mt. Oya, the highest peak in the Hanshin region at an altitude of 753 meters. The mascot of Inagawa is Inabō (いなぼう), a character of a wild boar.

=== Surrounding municipalities ===
Hyōgo Prefecture

- Kawanishi
- Sanda
- Takarazuka
- Tamba-Sasayama

Osaka Prefecture

- Nose

=== Climate ===
Inagawa has a Humid subtropical climate (Köppen Cfa) characterized by warm summers and cool winters with light snowfall. The average annual temperature in Inagawa is 14.0 °C. The average annual rainfall is 1583 mm with September as the wettest month. The temperatures are highest on average in August, at around 25.8 °C, and lowest in January, at around 2.6 °C.

== Demographics ==
Per Japanese census data, the population of Inagawa has quadrupled since the 1970s. The population growth rate for Inagawa is the highest in the nation, with numerous housing development planned and completed. In southern part of Inagawa, there are three large new towns, the Hankyu-Nissei Newtown (阪急日生ニュータウン), Inagawa Parktown (猪名川パークタウン), and Tsutsujigaoka (つつじが丘) and are located on the centre of Inagawa.

Historical population
| Year | Pop. | ±% |
|---|---|---|
| 1920 | 6,649 | — |
| 1930 | 6,576 | −1.1% |
| 1940 | 6,400 | −2.7% |
| 1950 | 7,747 | +21.0% |
| 1960 | 7,178 | −7.3% |
| 1970 | 7,038 | −2.0% |
| 1980 | 11,526 | +63.8% |
| 1990 | 21,557 | +87.0% |
| 2000 | 29,094 | +35.0% |
| 2010 | 31,448 | +8.1% |

== History ==
The area of Inagawa was part of ancient Settsu Province. The Tada silver mine has been in operation since the Nara period. In the Edo Period, this area was tenryo territory under the direct control of the Tokugawa shogunate. The villages of Nakatani (中谷村) and Mutsuse (六瀬村) were established on April 1, 1889, with the creation of the modern municipalities system. The two villages merged on April 10, 1955, to form the town of Inagawa.

== Government ==
Inagawa has a mayor-council form of government with a directly elected mayor and a unicameral town council of 16 members. Inagawa, together with the city of Kawanishi, contributes three members to the Hyōgo Prefectural Assembly. In terms of national politics, the town is part of Hyōgo 5t district of the lower house of the Diet of Japan.

== Economy ==
Since the closure of the Tada Silver Mine in 1973, Inagawa is largely a commuter town for neighboring Nishikawa and Osaka.

== Education ==
Inagawa has six public elementary schools and two public middle school operated by the town government, and one public high school operated by the Hyōgo Prefectural Board of Education.

== Transportation ==
=== Railways ===
Nose Electric Railway - Nissei Line

- Nissei-chuo

=== Highway ===
- Shin-Meishin Expressway
- National Route 173

== Sister cities ==
- Ballarat, Victoria, Australia

== Local attractions ==
- Tada Silver and Copper Mine (多田銀銅山) is located in the southern part of Inagawa. It is claimed, with some uncertainty, that Toyotomi Hideyoshi's treasures are buried there.

== Notable people from Inagawa ==
- Eriko Hirose (廣瀬栄理子)
- Tatsuya Ikeda (池田達也), professional football player
- Nobuyuki Mori (森信行), musician
- Maiko Nakaoka (中岡麻衣子), professional football player
- Ayumu Yamamoto (山本歩), professional football player
