= Satsukiyama Zoo =

Satsukiyama Zoo 五月山動物園
- Interactive map of Satsukiyama Zoo 五月山動物園
- 34.8304°N 135.4254°E
- Date opened: April 1957
- Location: 5-33, 2-chome, Ayaha, Ikeda, Osaka, Japan
- Memberships: JAZA
- Website: www.satsukiyamazoo.com (in Japanese)

Satsukiyama Zoo (五月山動物園) is located at Satsukiyama Park, at the base of Mount Satsuki in Ikeda, Osaka, Japan. The zoo opened in April, 1957. The zoo is the municipal zoo of Ikeda.

The zoo is the second smallest zoo (3000 m^{2}) in all zoos belonging to Japanese Association of Zoos and Aquariums (JAZA).

== Wombats ==
In 1992, wombats were successfully bred at the zoo, which was the first time outside of Australia.

== Idol group ==
Keeper Girls is a female idol music group created in August 2015. The group belongs to the zoo.

== Access ==
- a 15-minute walk from Ikeda Station on the Takarazuka Main Line of Hankyu Railway.
