= Toyo College of Food Technology =

Junior college in Kawanishi, Hyōgo, Japan

Coordinates: 34°49′27.7″N 135°24′3.2″E

Tōyō College of Food Technology
- 東洋食品工業大学
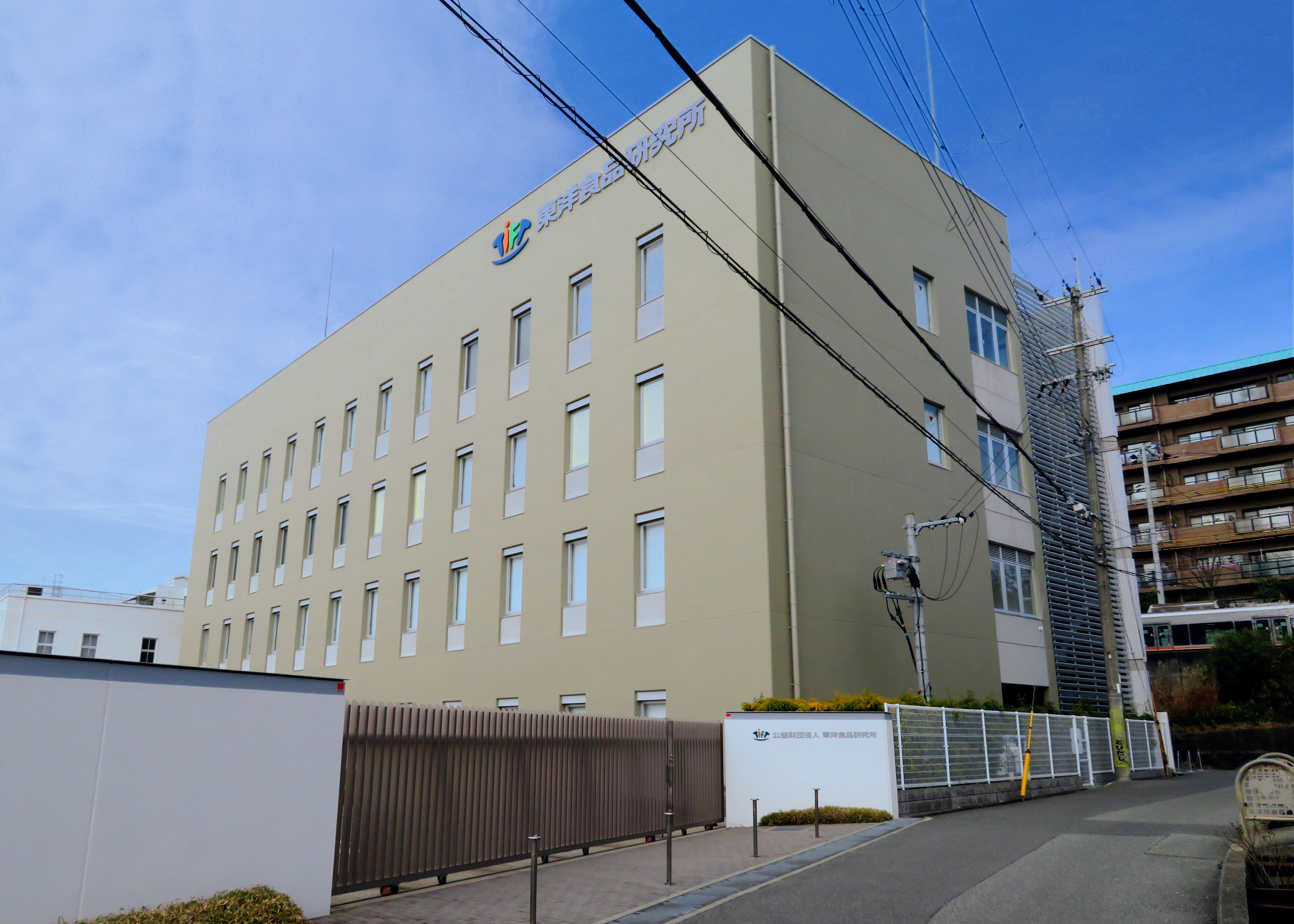
- Established: 1961

Toyo College of Food Technology (東洋食品工業短期大学, Tōyō shokuhin kōgyō tanki daigaku) is a private junior college in Kawanishi, Hyōgo, Japan.
