= Myōkenguchi Station =

Railway station in Toyono, Osaka Prefecture, Japan

Myōkenguchi Station 妙見口駅
- Myōkenguchi Station, May 2026

General information
- Location: Yoshikawa, Toyono-chō, Toyono-gun, Osaka-fu 563-0101; Japan
- Coordinates: 34°54′42.45″N 135°26′42.54″E
- Operator: Nose Electric Railway
- Line: ■ Myōken Line
- Distance: 12.2 km (7.6 miles) from Kawanishi-Noseguchi
- Platforms: 2 bay platform

Other information
- Status: Unstaffed
- Station code: NS14
- Website: Official website

History
- Opened: 3 November 1923; 102 years ago

Passengers
- FY2019: 877 daily
Location
- Location within Osaka Prefecture Location within Japan

Myōkenguchi Station (妙見口駅, Myōkenguchi-eki) is a passenger railway station located in the town of Toyono, Toyono District, Osaka Prefecture, Japan. It is operated by the private transportation company Nose Electric Railway.

== Lines ==
Myōkenguchi Station is the terminus of the Myōken Line, and is located 12.2 kilometers (7.6 mi) from the opposing terminus of the line at Kawanishi-Noseguchi.

== Station layout ==
The station consists of two bay platforms. The effective length of the platform is for four-carriage trains. The station is unattended.

== Adjacent stations ==
«	Service	»
Nose Railway Myōken Line
Terminus	Myoken Express	Tokiwadai
Terminus	Local	Tokiwadai

== History ==
Myōkenguchi Station opened on 3 November 1923 as Myōken Station (妙見駅, Myōken-eki). On 1 April 1965 it was renamed Nose-Myōkenguchi Station (能勢妙見口駅, Nose-Myōkenguchi-eki), but the name was shortened to Myōkenguchi Station three months later in July 1965.

== Passenger statistics ==
In fiscal 2019, the station was used by an average of 877 passengers daily

== Surrounding area ==
- Myoken no Mori Cable Kurokawa Station (about 20 minutes on foot, about 5 minutes by bus)
- Sakuradani Light Railway (about 10 minutes on foot)
- Yoshikawa Hachiman Shrine
- Toyono Municipal Yoshikawa Elementary School

== Gallery ==
Pictures of the Station
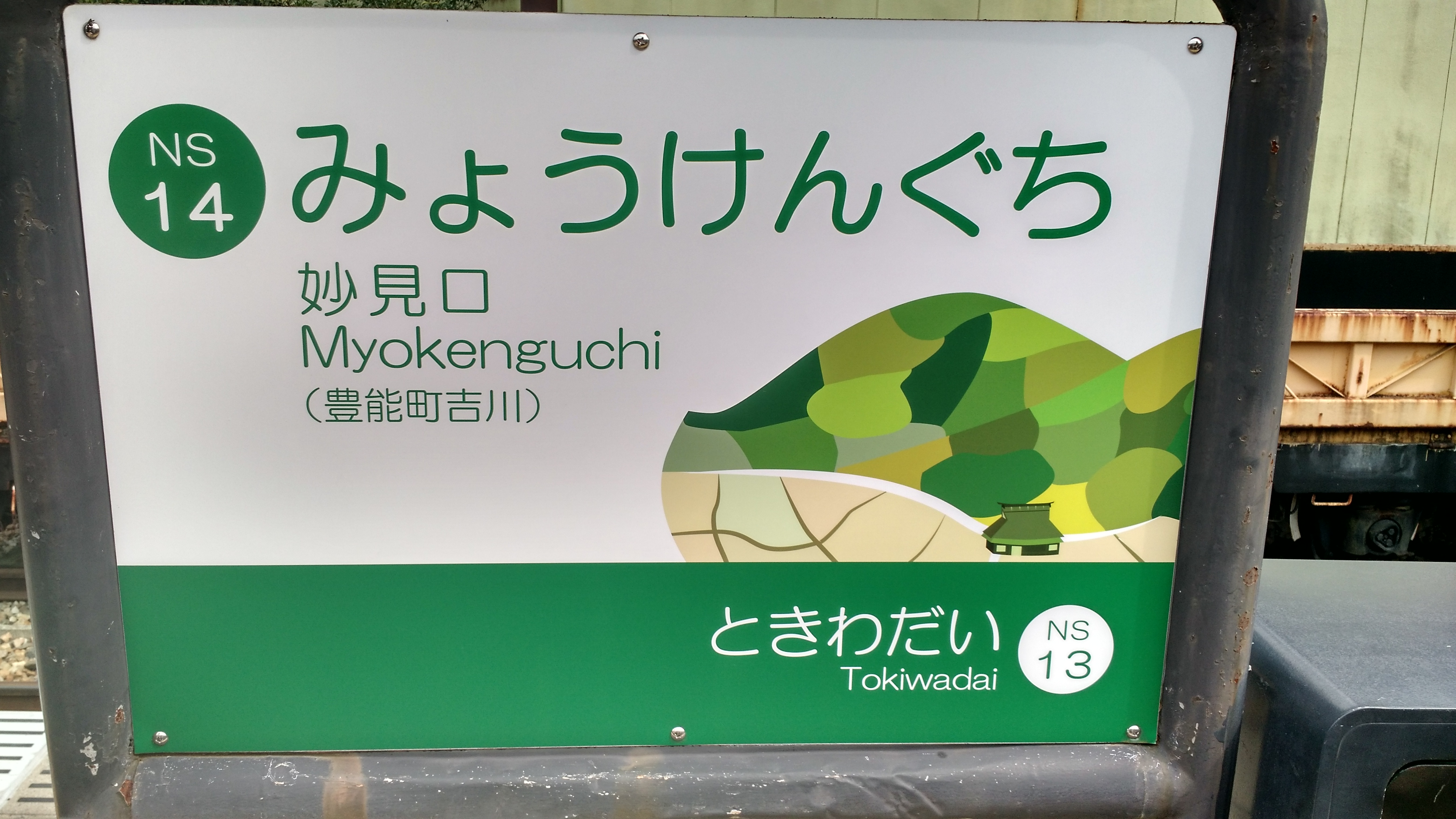
Station Platform Sign

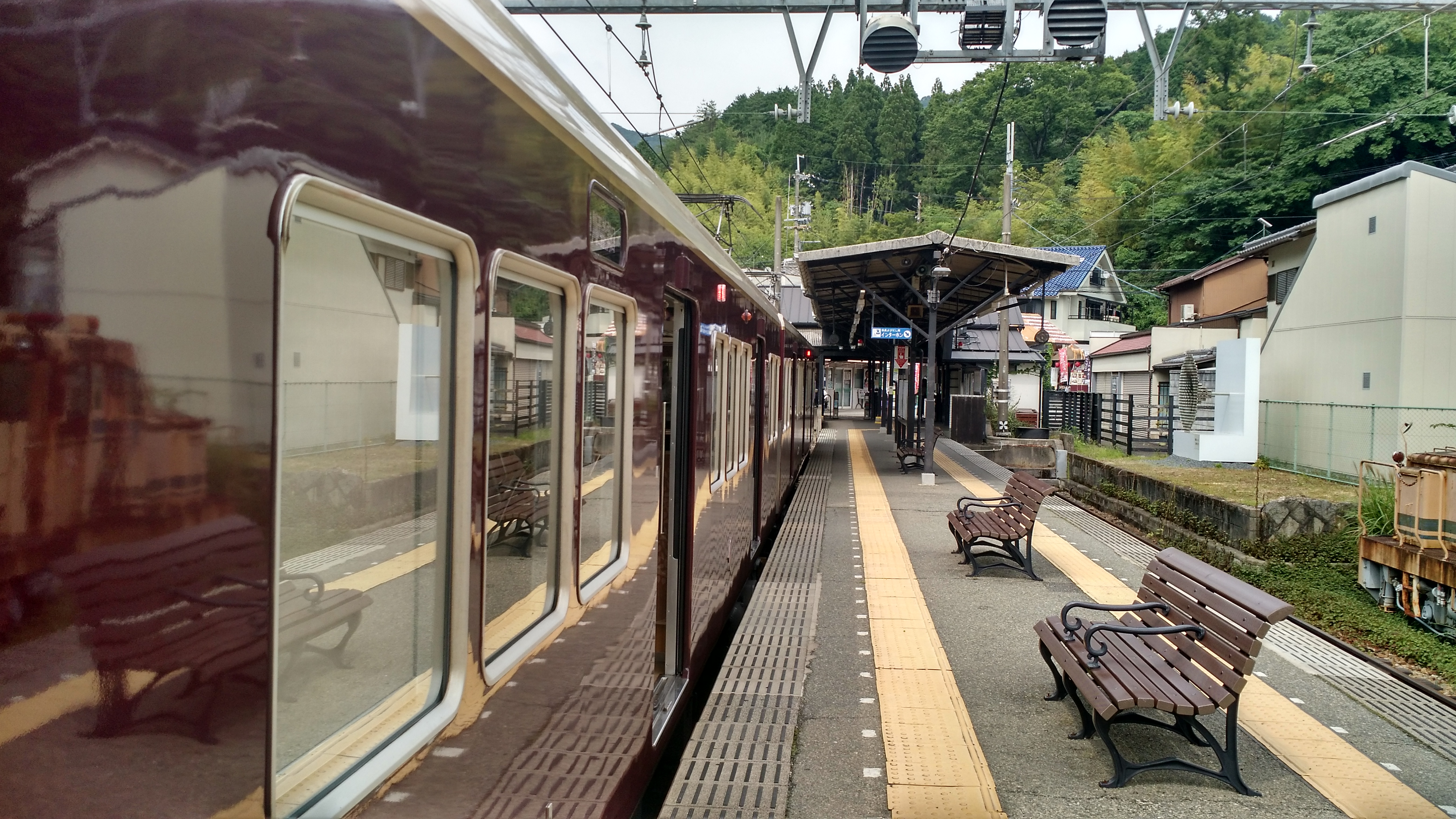
Station Platform

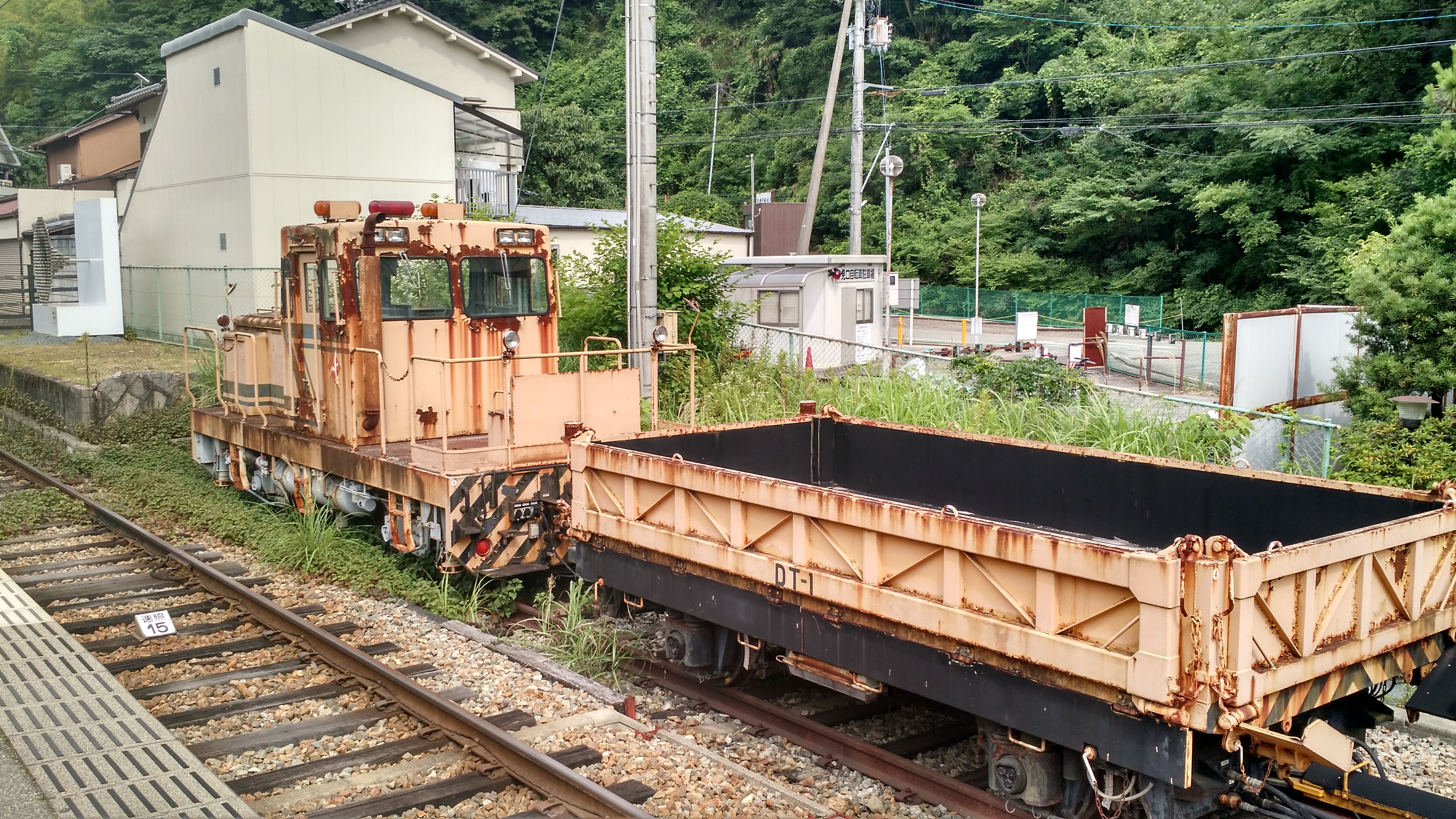
Maintenance Engine and Gravel Car

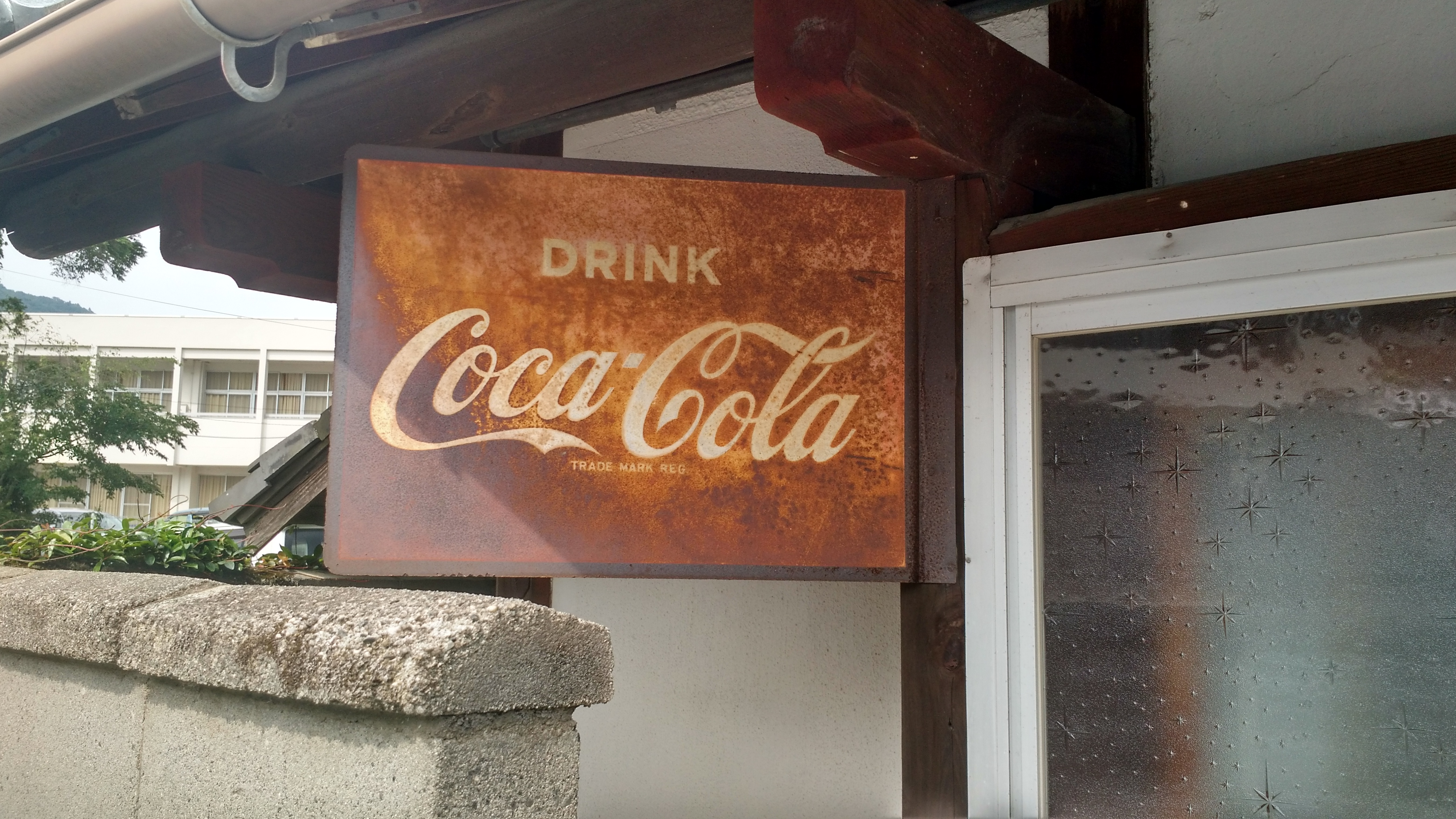
Advertisement Sign in Station

== See also ==
- List of railway stations in Japan
