= Taki Renzan Prefectural Natural Park =

Natural park of Hyogo prefecture, Japan

- 多紀連山県立自然公園
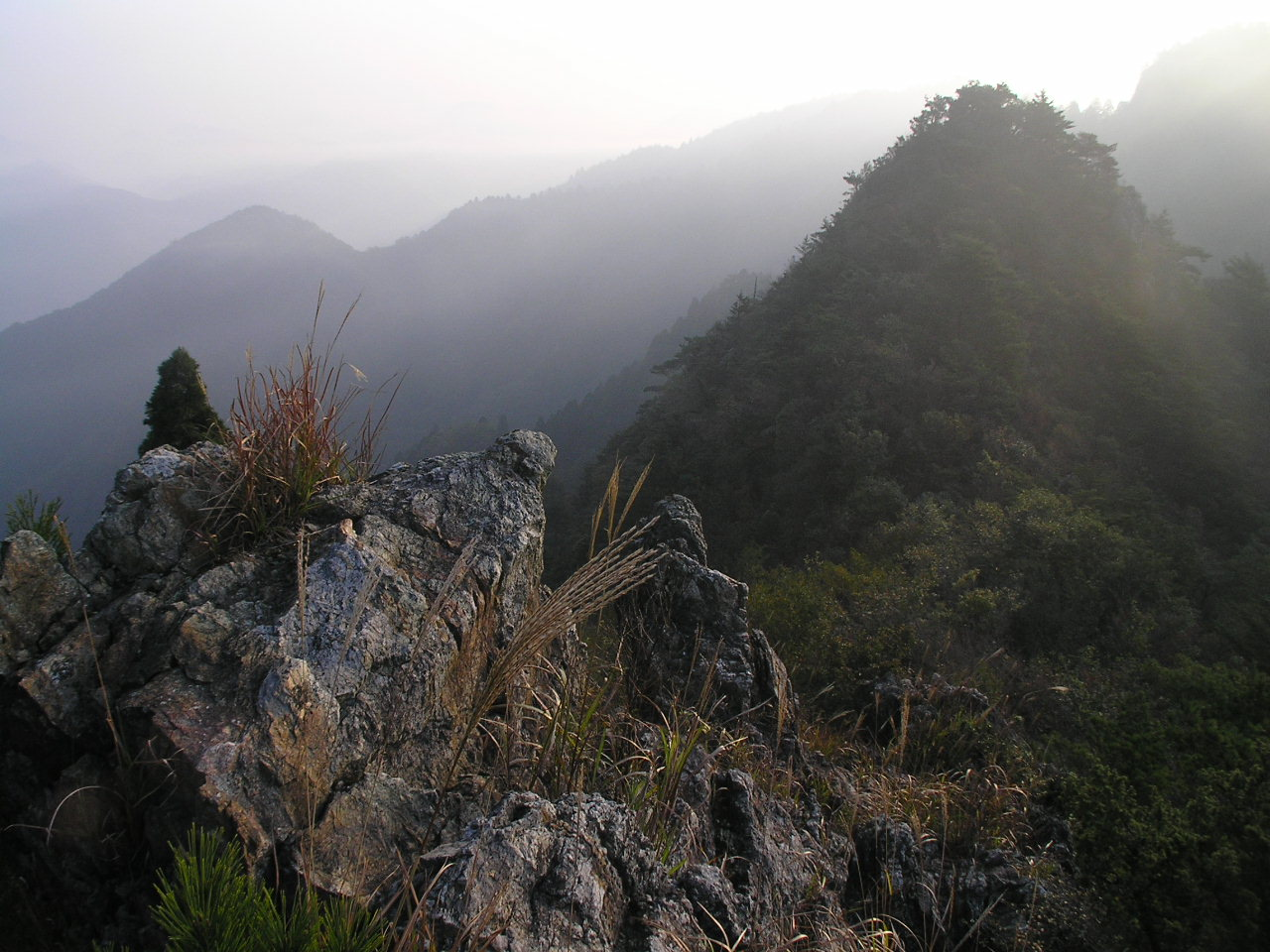
- Taki Renzan
- Interactive map of Taki Renzan Prefectural Natural Park
- Location: Hyōgo Prefecture, Japan
- Area: 93.50 km^{2} (36.10 sq mi)
- Established: 27 April 1957

Taki Renzan Prefectural Natural Park (多紀連山県立自然公園, Taki Renzan kenritsu shizen kōen) is a Prefectural Natural Park in eastern Hyōgo Prefecture, Japan. Established in 1957, the park spans the municipalities of Sasayama and Tamba.

== See also ==
- National Parks of Japan
