= Toyono District, Osaka =

District in Ōsaka prefecture, Japan

Coordinates: 34.973°N 135.426°E

Location of Toyono District in Osaka

Toyono (豊能郡, Toyono-gun) is a district located in Osaka Prefecture, Japan.

In 2009 the district had an estimated population of 34,135 and a density of 257 persons per km^{2}. The total area is 133.05 km^{2}.

== Towns ==
- Nose
- Toyono
  - The town is served by Nose Electric Railway, accessed via Myōkenguchi Station, and a tourist information center in the form of a log cabin
