= Mount Taka (Osaka/Hyōgo) =

Mountain in the country of Japan

- 高岳
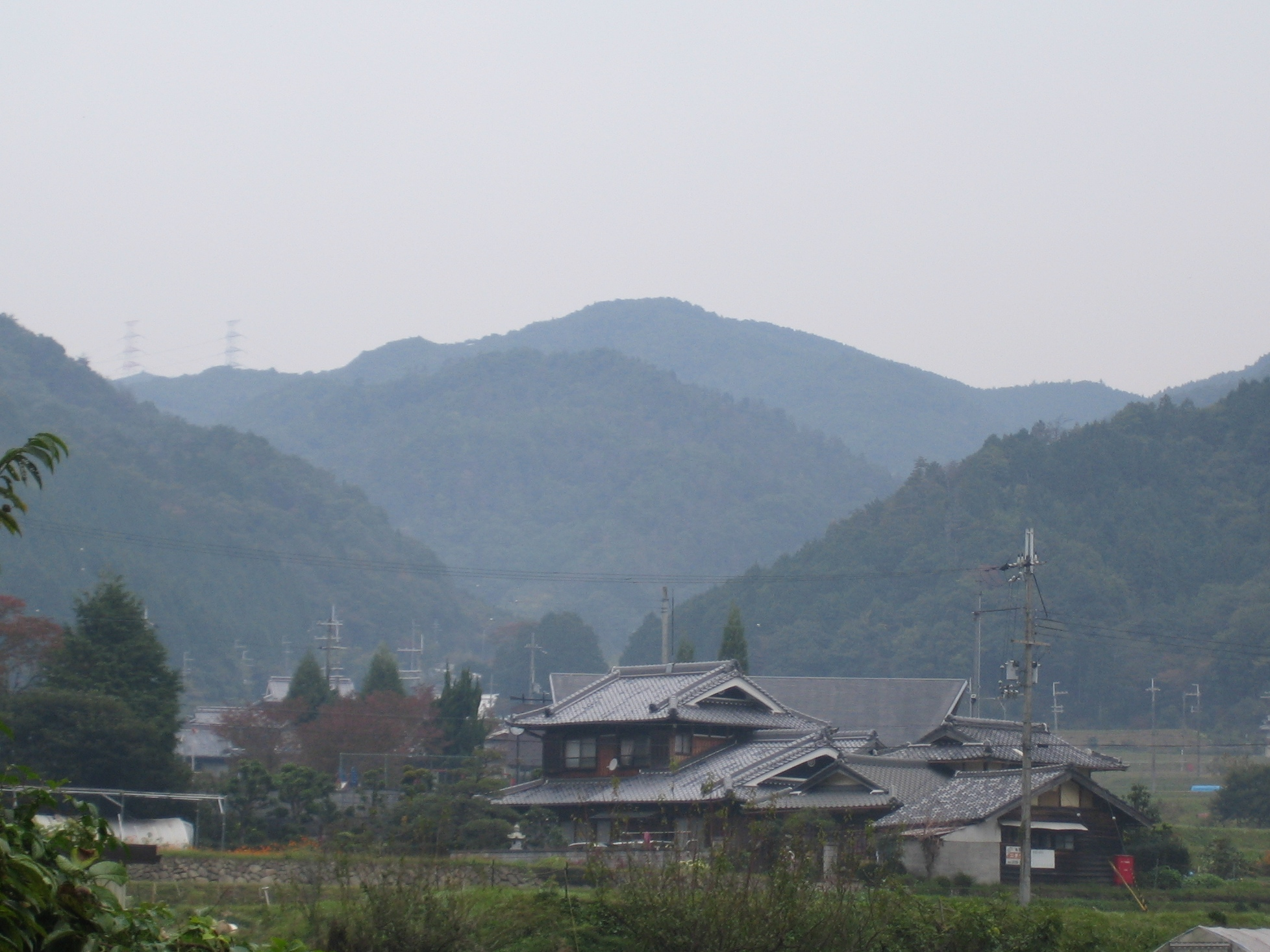
- Seen from the SSE

Highest point
- Elevation: 720.8 m (2,365 ft)
- Coordinates: 35°0′6″N 135°21′11″E

Naming
- Language of name: Japanese
- Pronunciation: [takadake]

Geography
- Location: On the border of Inagawa, Hyōgo and Nose, Ōsaka, Japan
- Parent range: Hokusetsu Mountains

Mount Taka (高岳, Taka-dake) is a 720.8 m (2,365 ft) mountain of the Hokusetsu Mountains, located on the border of Inagawa, Hyōgo and Nose, Ōsaka, Japan. This mountain is one of Osaka 50 mountains, and an important part of Hokusetsu Natural Park.

== Outline ==
Mount Taka is one of the major mountains of Hokusetsu Mountains. Hokusetsu Mountains are themselves sometimes regarded as a part of Tanba Highland. Mount Taka is a typical mountain in this area like Mount Kenpi, Mount Yokoo and Mount Hankokou.

== Religion ==
Mount Taka which has a pyramidal shape has been an object of worship by the people around the mountain. The most religious spot in the middle of this mountain is Inagawa Fudoson Temple.

== Route ==
There are three routes to the top of the mountain. One is the most popular from Sugio Bus Stop via Inagawa Fudoson. It takes about two hours. From Morigami Bus Stop, there are two routes. It take roughly two and half hours from Morigami to the top.

== Access ==
- Sugio Bus Stop of Hankyu Bus
- Morigami Bus Stop of Hankyu Bus

== Gallery ==
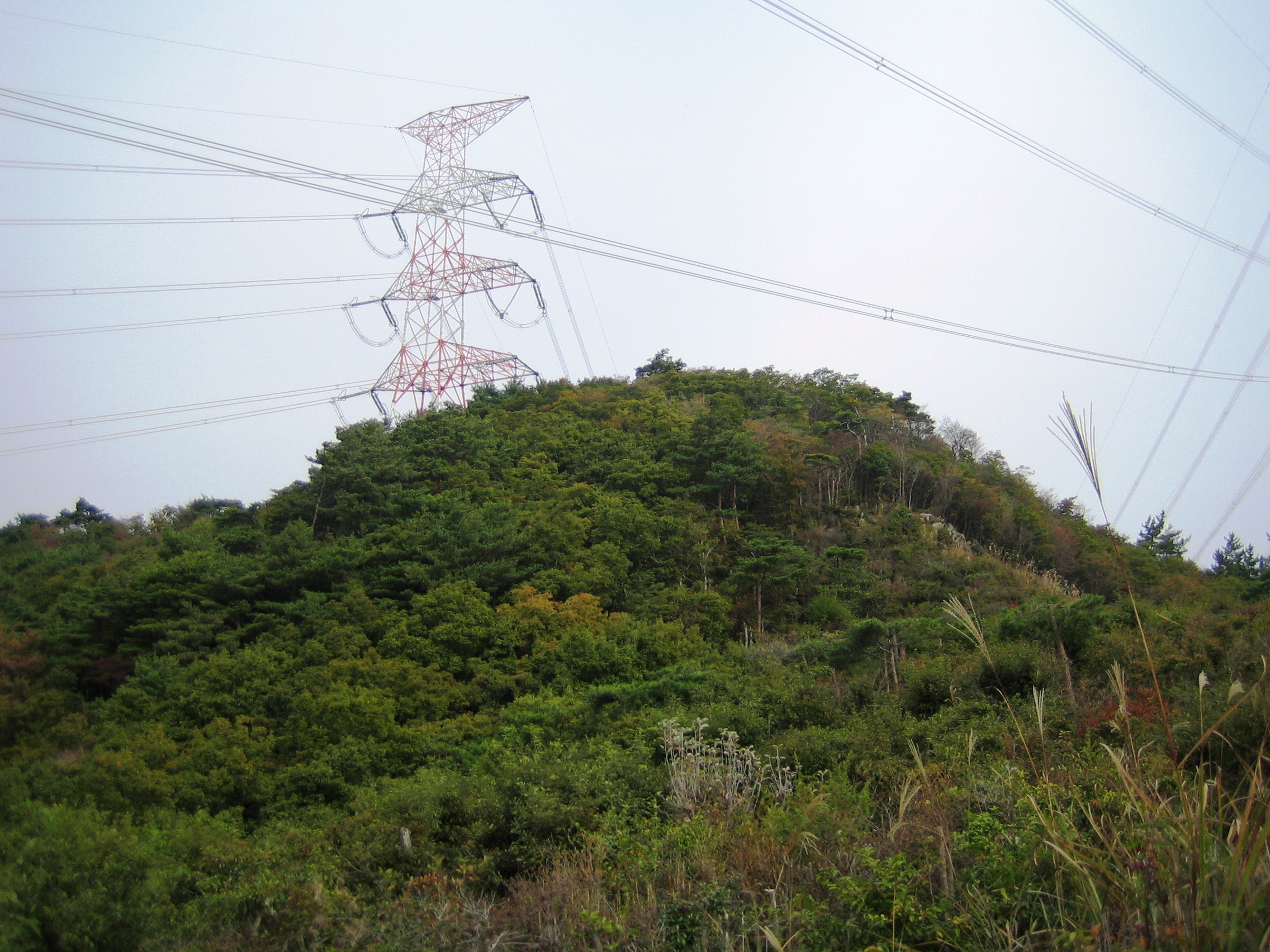
Mount Taka from south

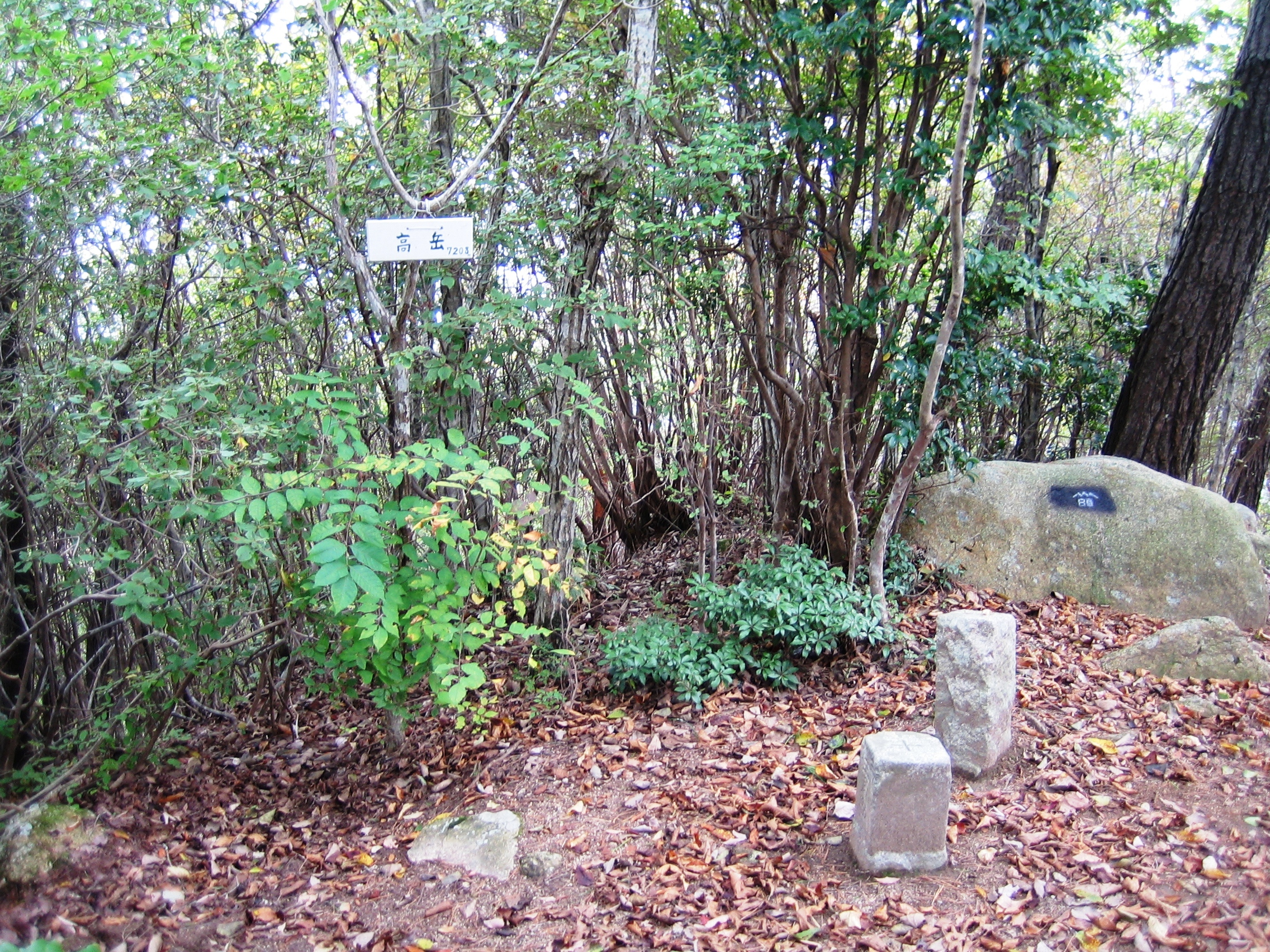
The top of Mount Taka

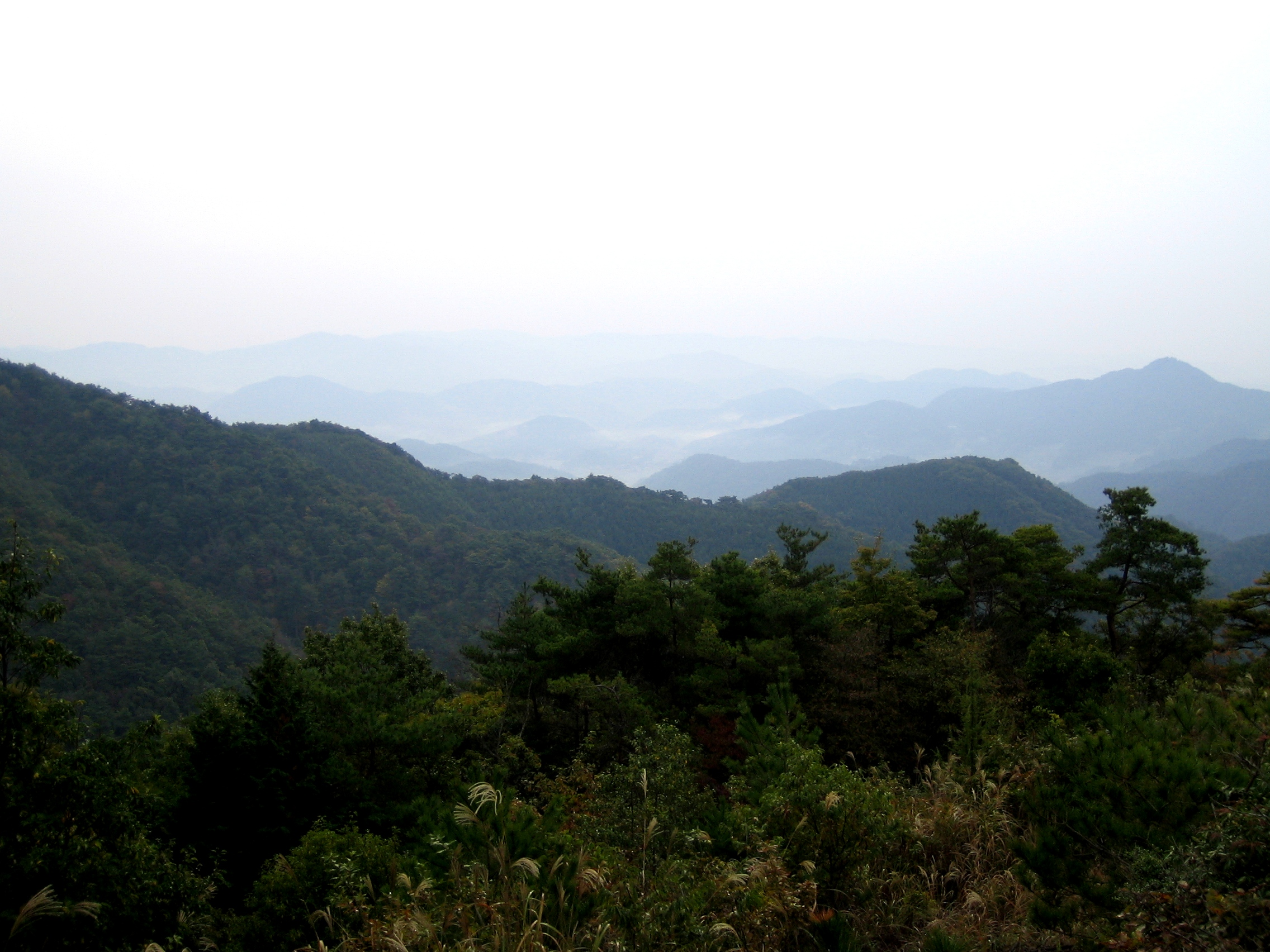
Southeast view from the top of Mount Taka

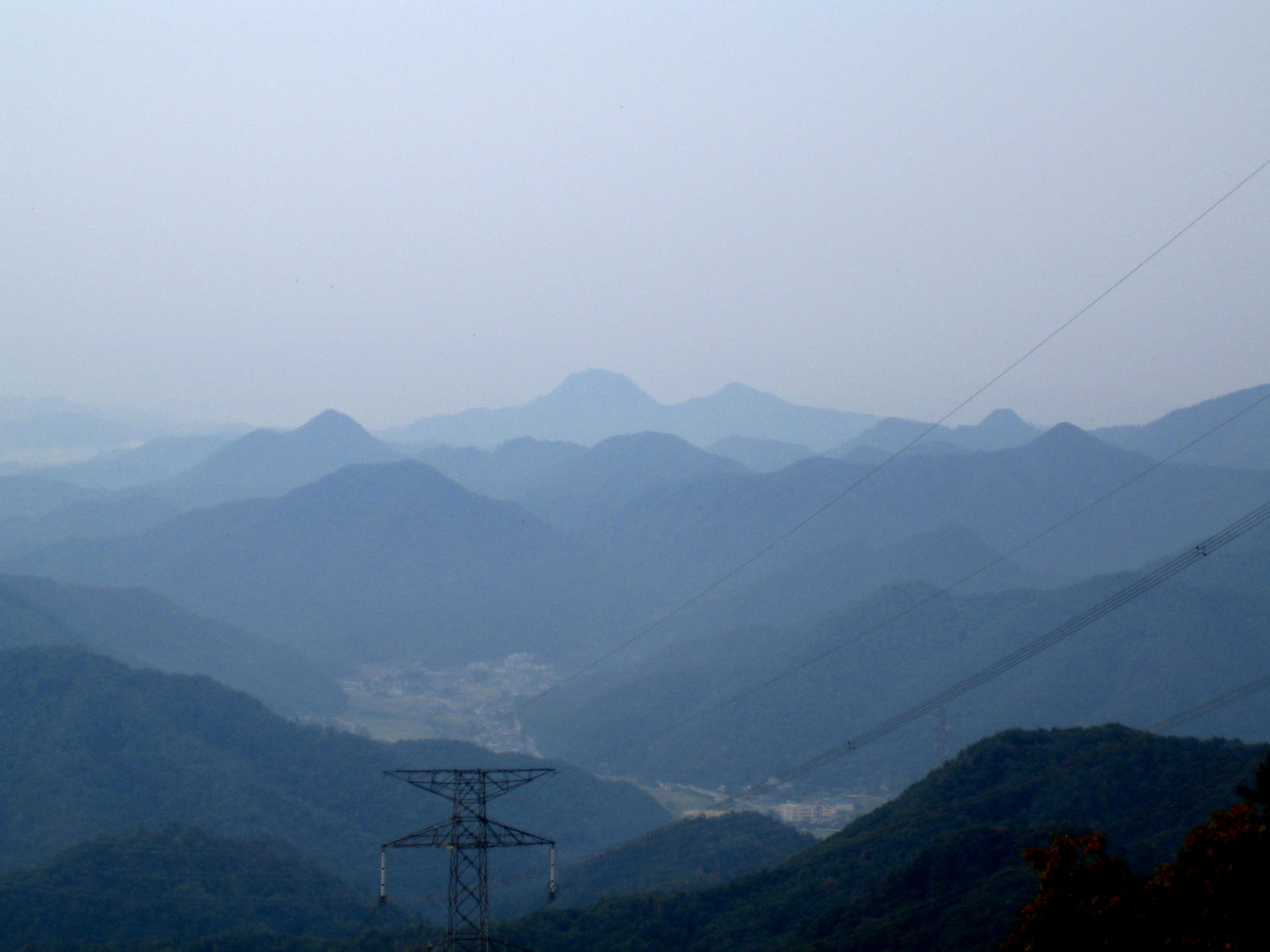
Southwest view from the top of Mount Taka

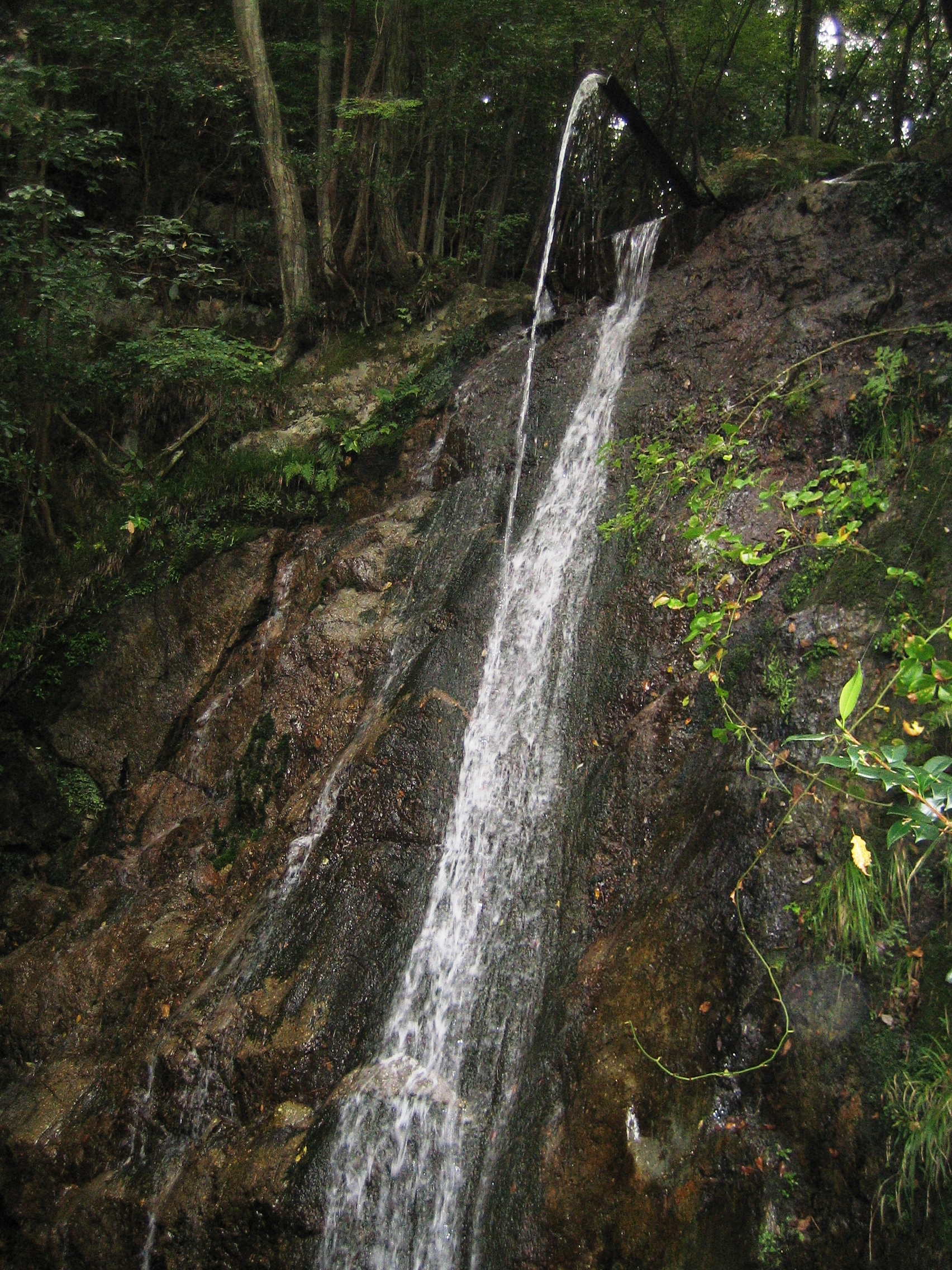
Kongo waterfall at Inagawa Fudoson Temple

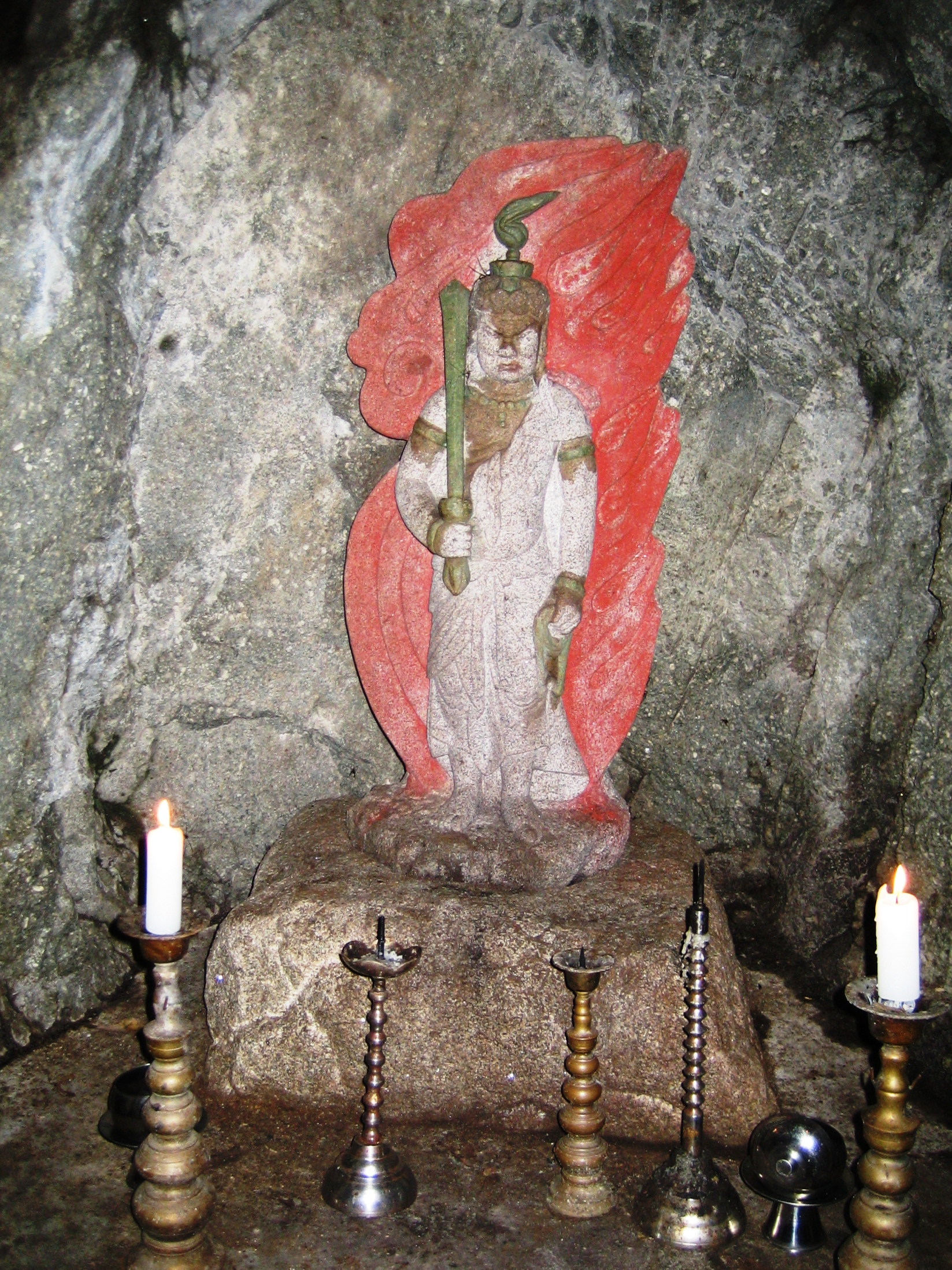
Acra at Inagawa Fudoson Temple

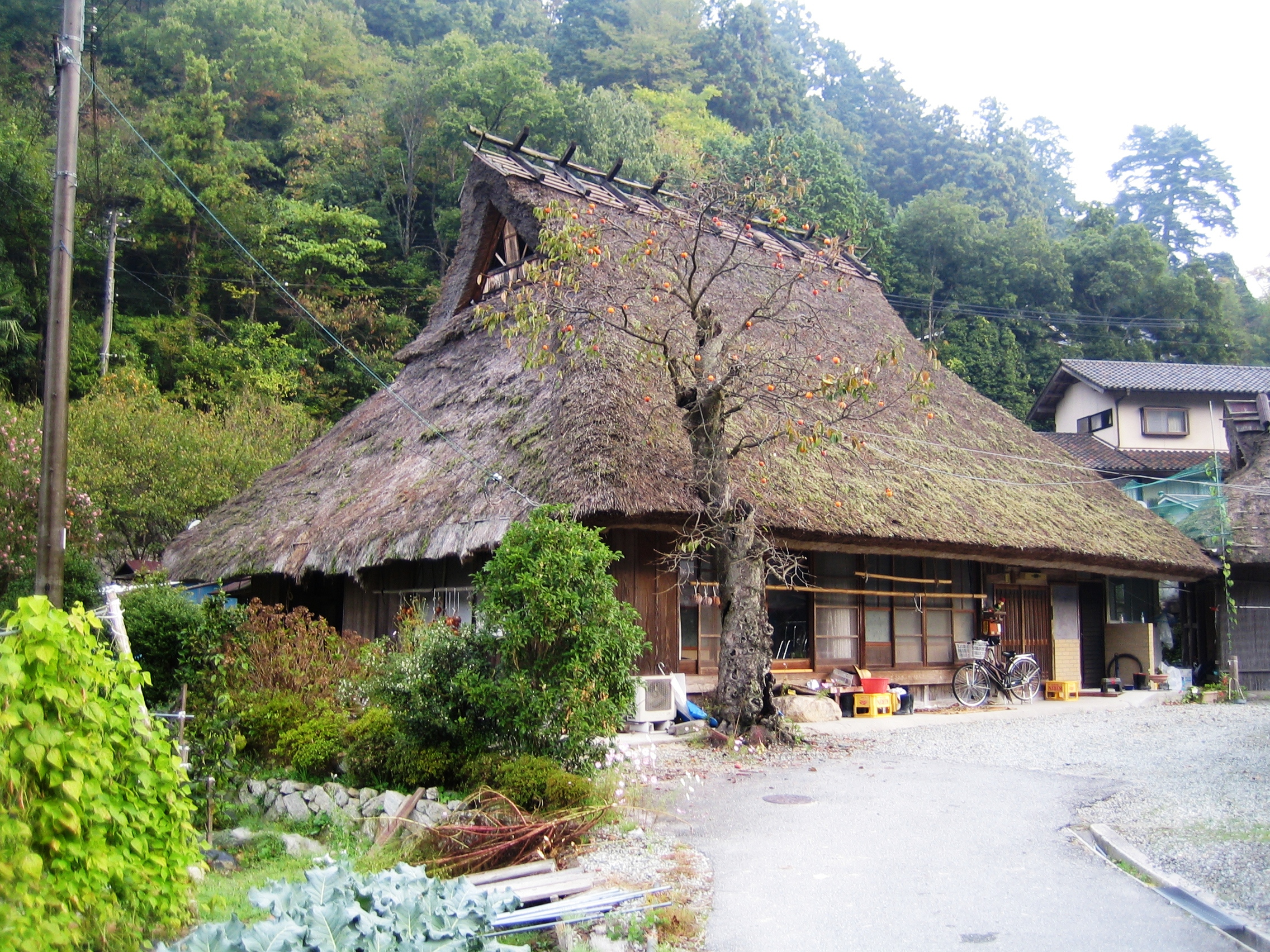
A view at Mount Taka
