= Hannan-Misaki Prefectural Natural Park =

Prefectural Natural Park in Ōsaka Prefecture, Japan

- 大阪府立阪南・岬自然公園
- Location within Osaka Prefecture Location within Japan
- Location: Ōsaka Prefecture, Japan
- Coordinates: 34.3083°N 135.225°E
- Area: 9.47 km^{2} (3.66 sq mi)
- Established: 7 July 2011

Hannan-Misaki Prefectural Natural Park (大阪府立阪南・岬自然公園, Ōsaka furitsu Hannan-Misaki shizen kōen) is a Prefectural Natural Park near the coast of southwest Ōsaka Prefecture, Japan. Established in 2011, the park comprises four non-contiguous areas of forested hills in the municipalities of Hannan and Misaki.

== See also ==
- National Parks of Japan
- Kongō-Ikoma-Kisen Quasi-National Park
- Meiji no Mori Minō Quasi-National Park
- Hokusetsu Prefectural Natural Park
