= Mount Kenpi =

Mountain in the country of Japan

- 剣尾山
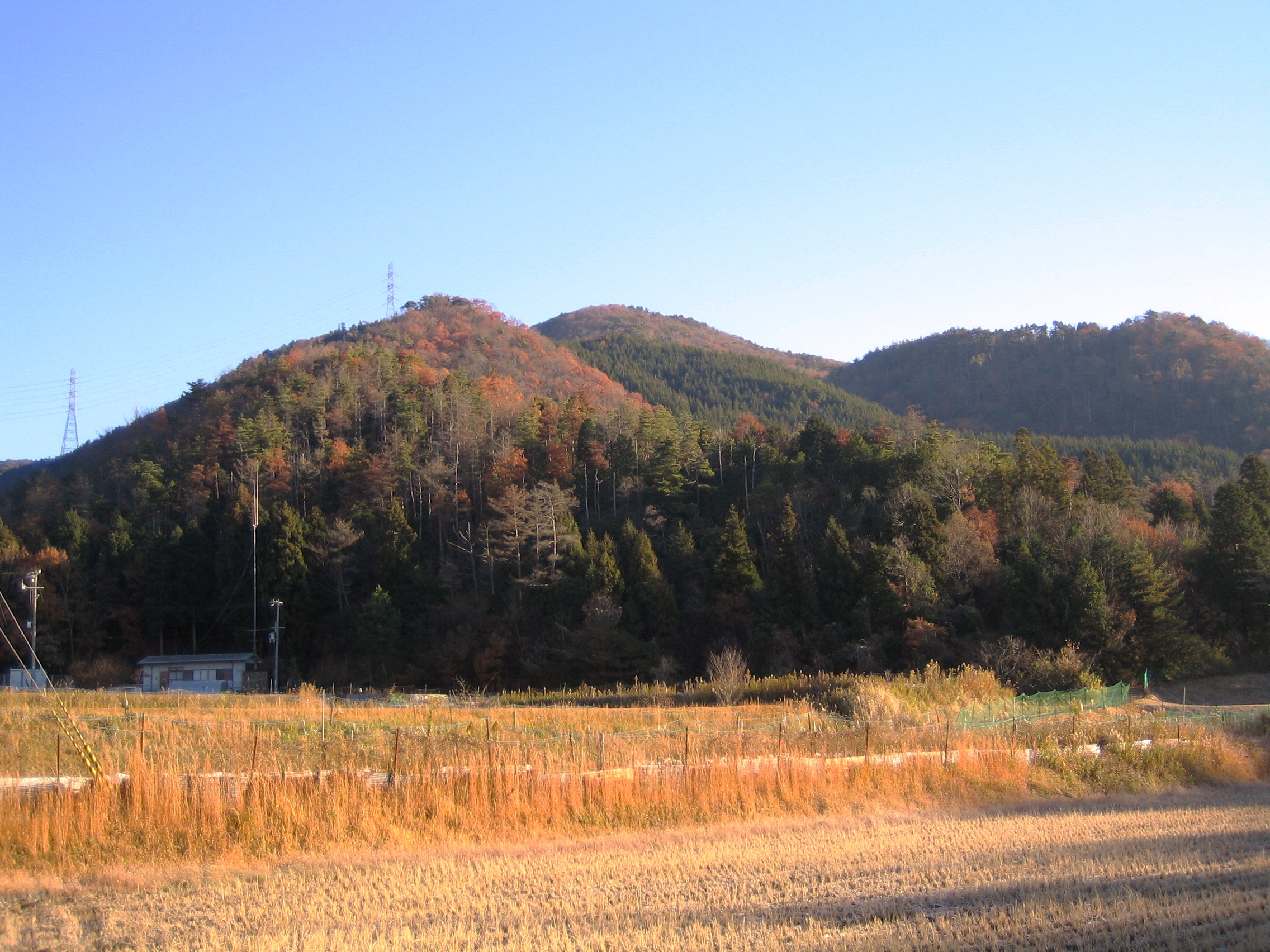
- Mount Kenpi

Highest point
- Elevation: 784 m (2,572 ft)
- Listing: List of mountains and hills of Japan by height
- Coordinates: 35°00′12″N 135°24′14″E

Naming
- Language of name: Japanese
- Pronunciation: [kempi̥saɴ]

Geography
- Location: Nose, Ōsaka, Japan
- Parent range: Hokusetsu Mountains

Mount Kenpi (剣尾山, Kenpi-san) is one of the mountains in the Hokusetsu Mountains and is a part of Hokusetsu Natural Park, located in Nose, Ōsaka, Japan. It is 784 m (2,572 ft) high.

== Gallery ==
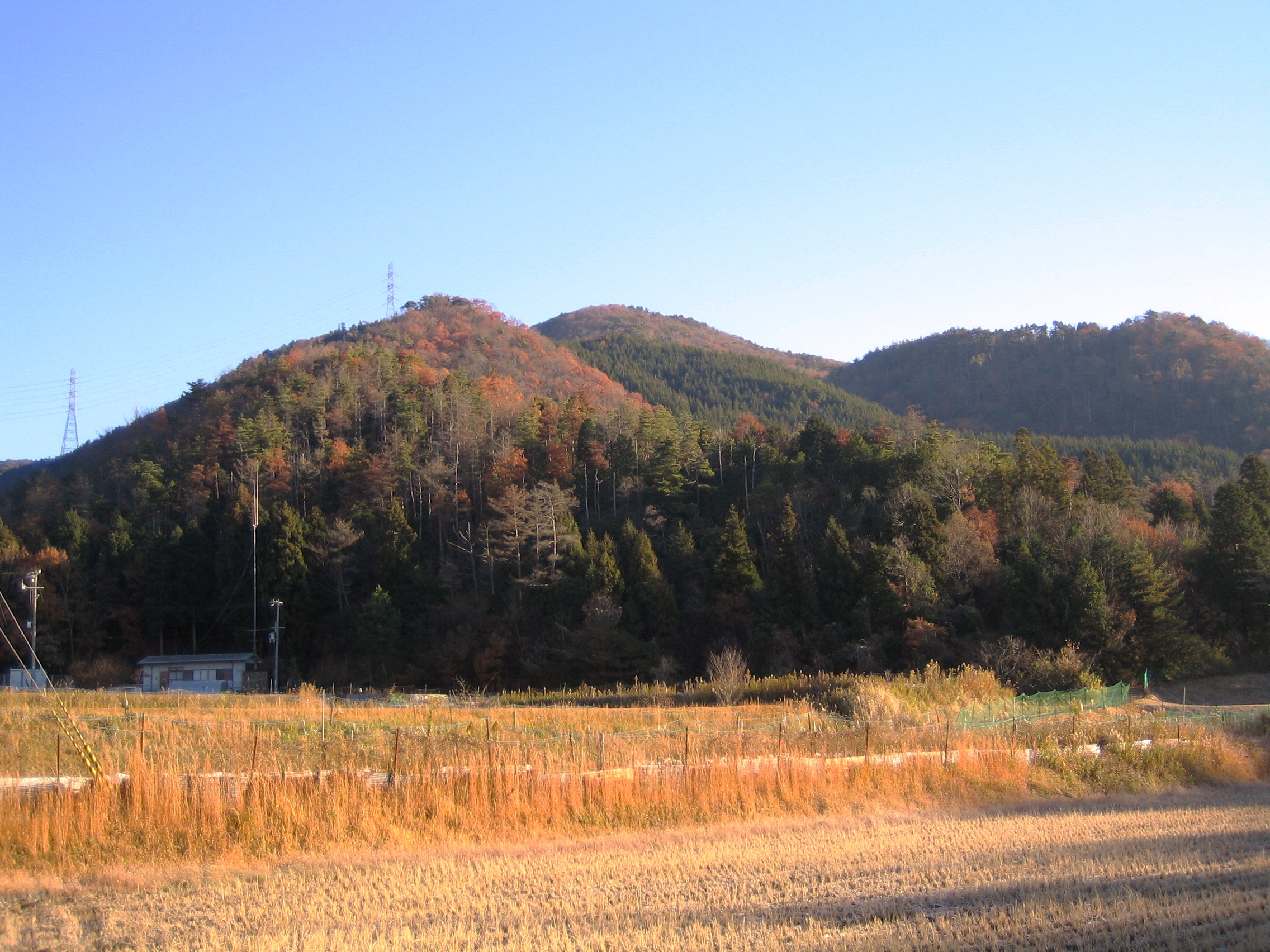
Mount Kenpi from Gyojaguchi Bus Stop

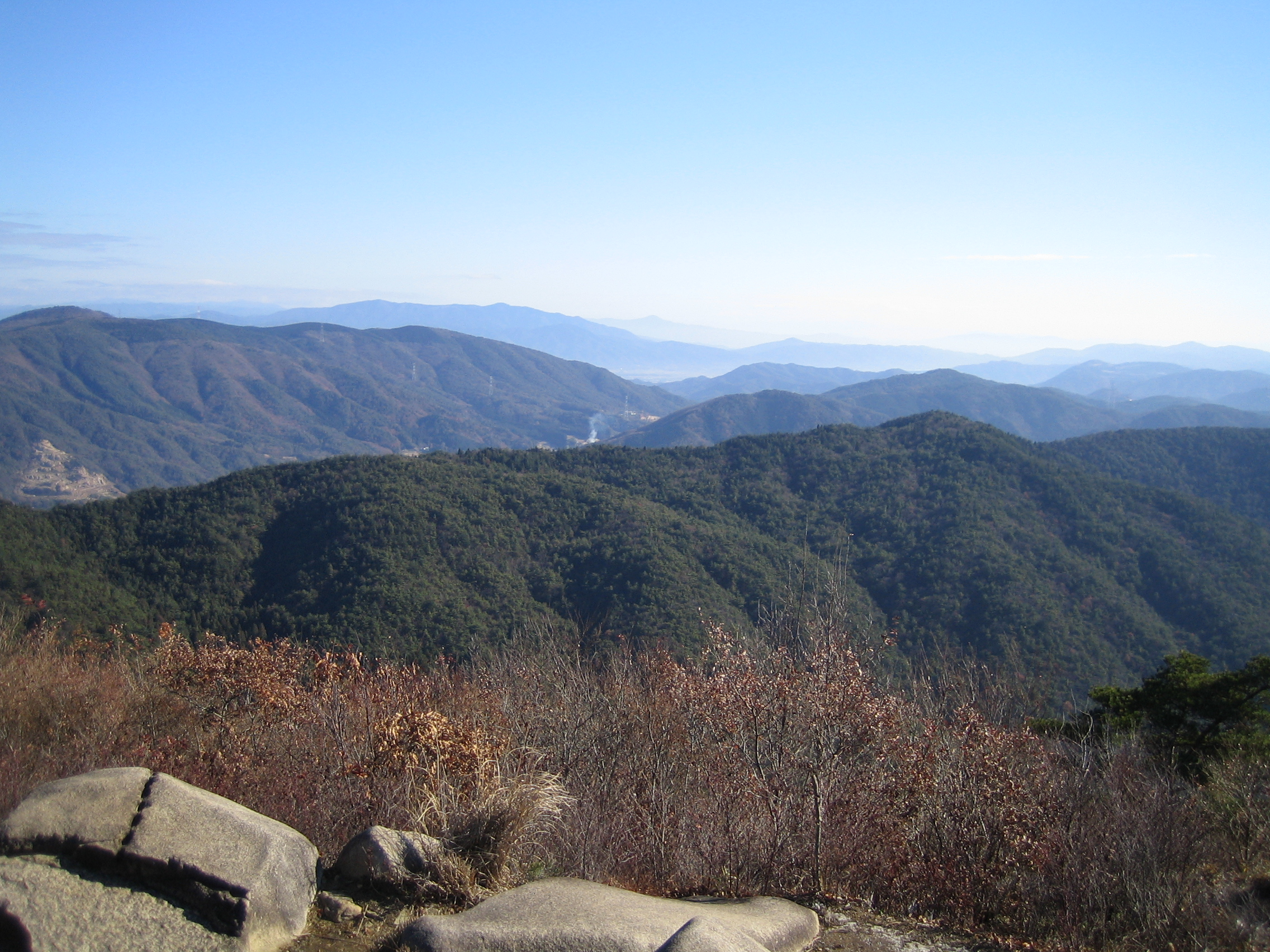
Northside view from the top of Mount Kenpi

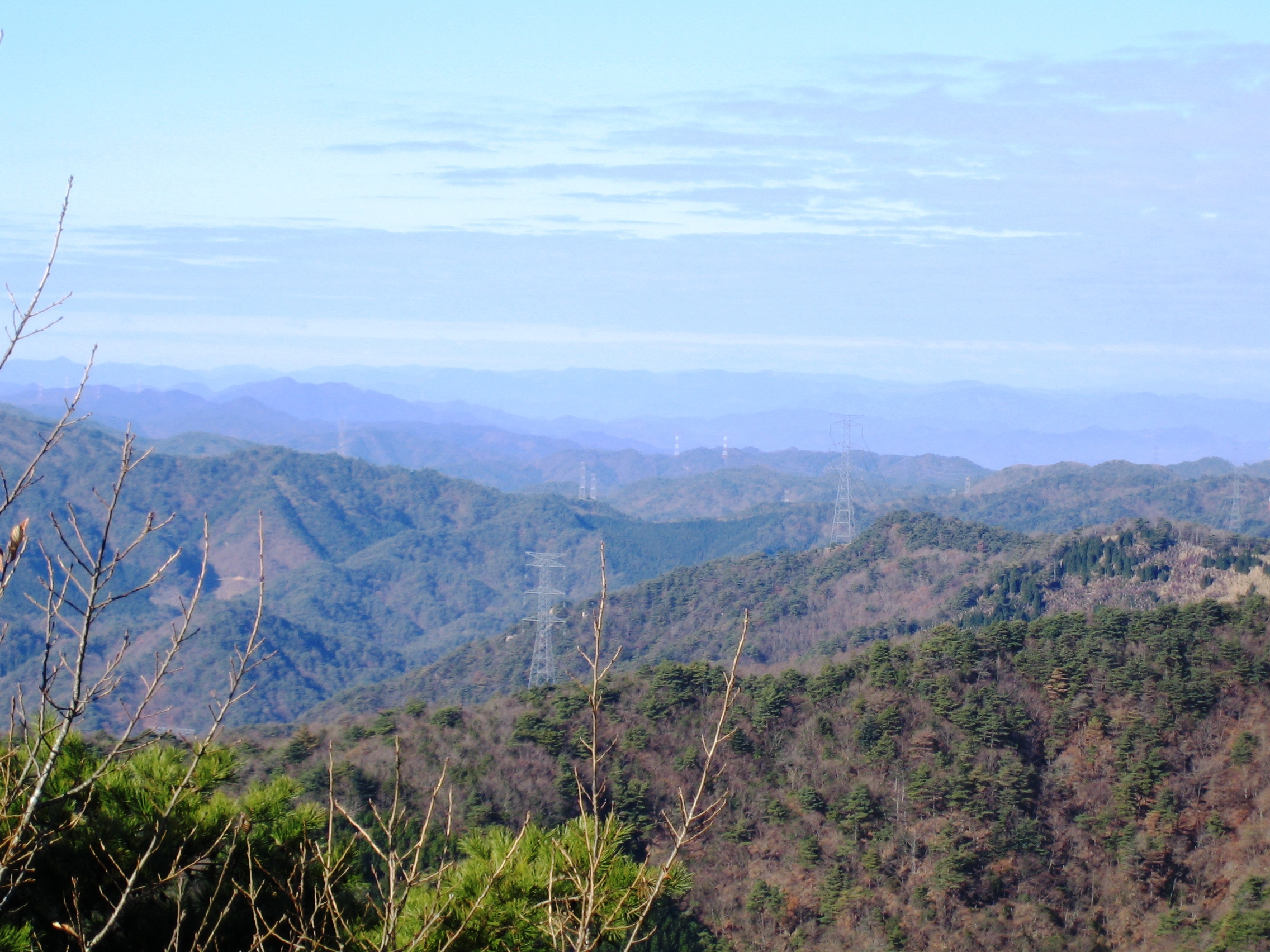
Westhside view from the top of Mount Kenpi

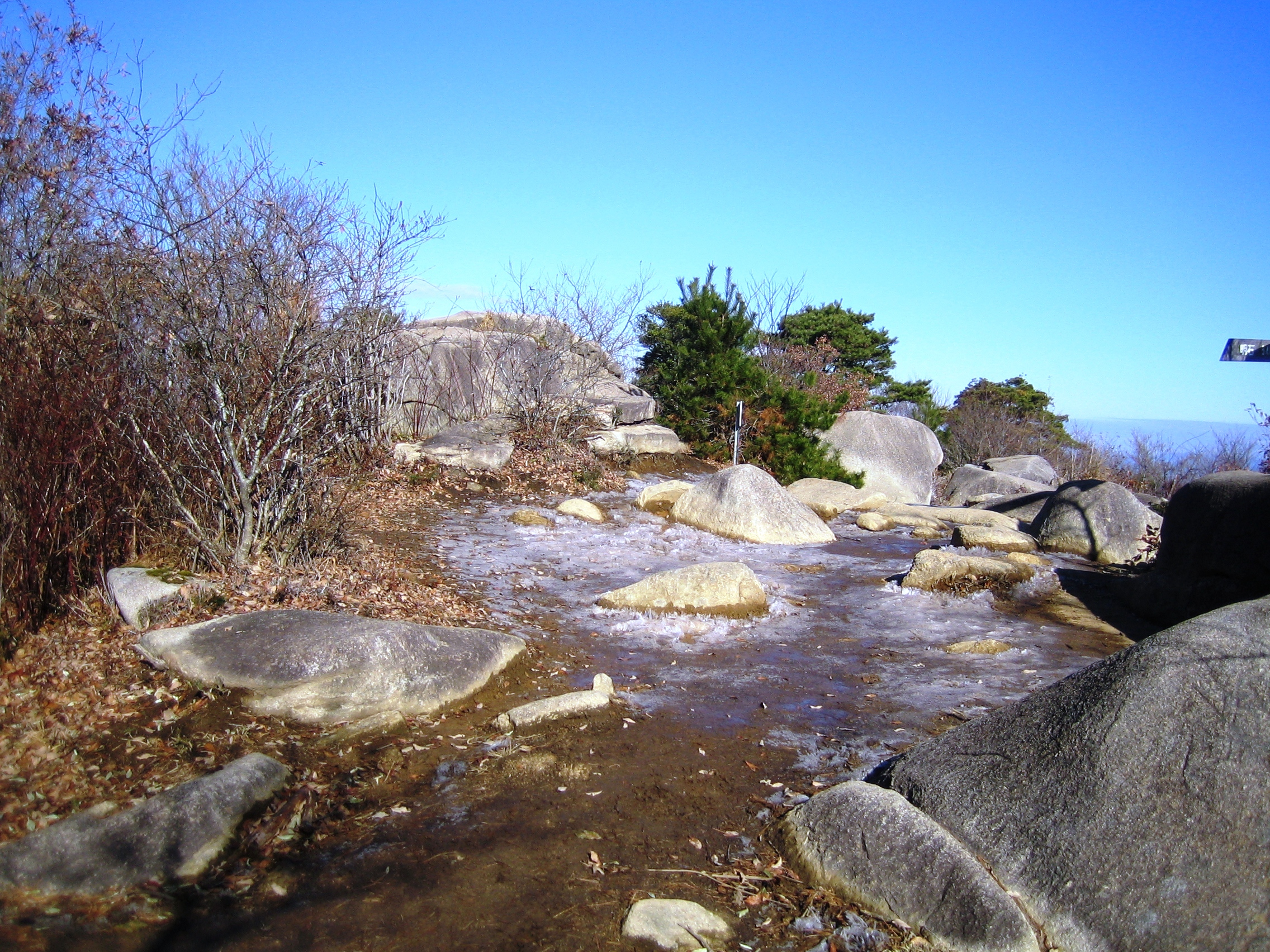
The top of Mount Kenpi

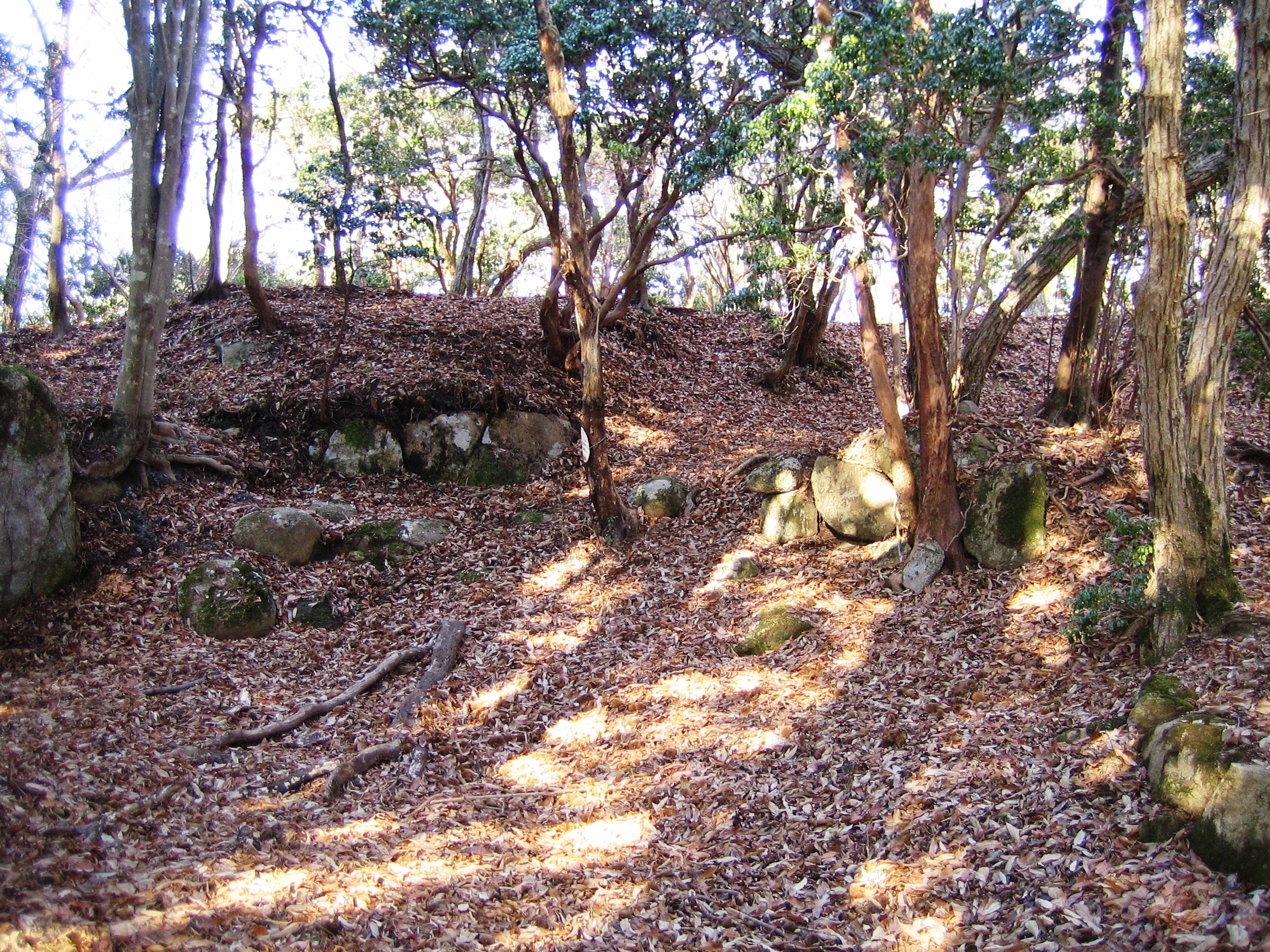
Ruins of Geppo-ji temple

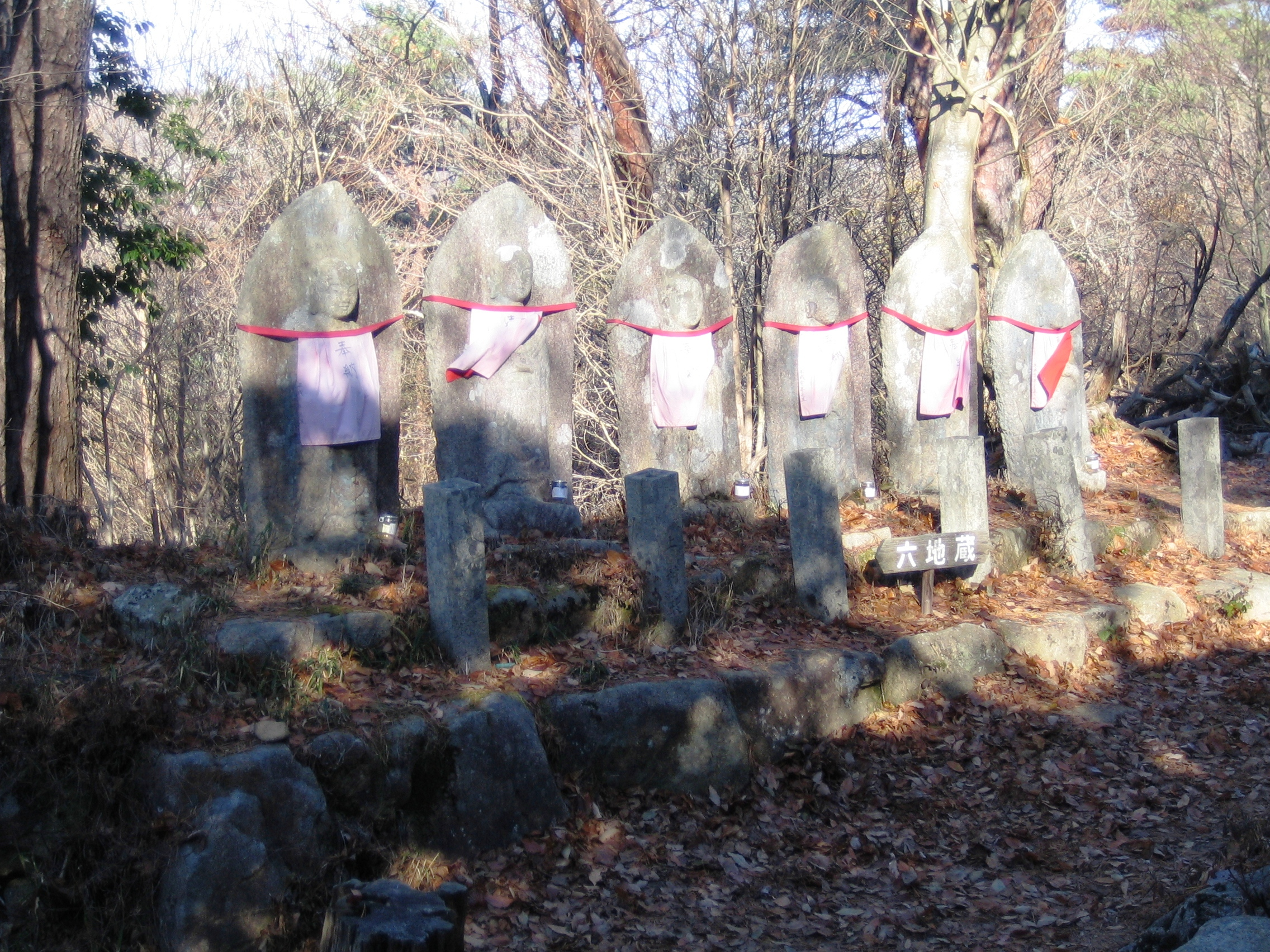
Six Buddhas at the Ruins of Geppo-ji temple

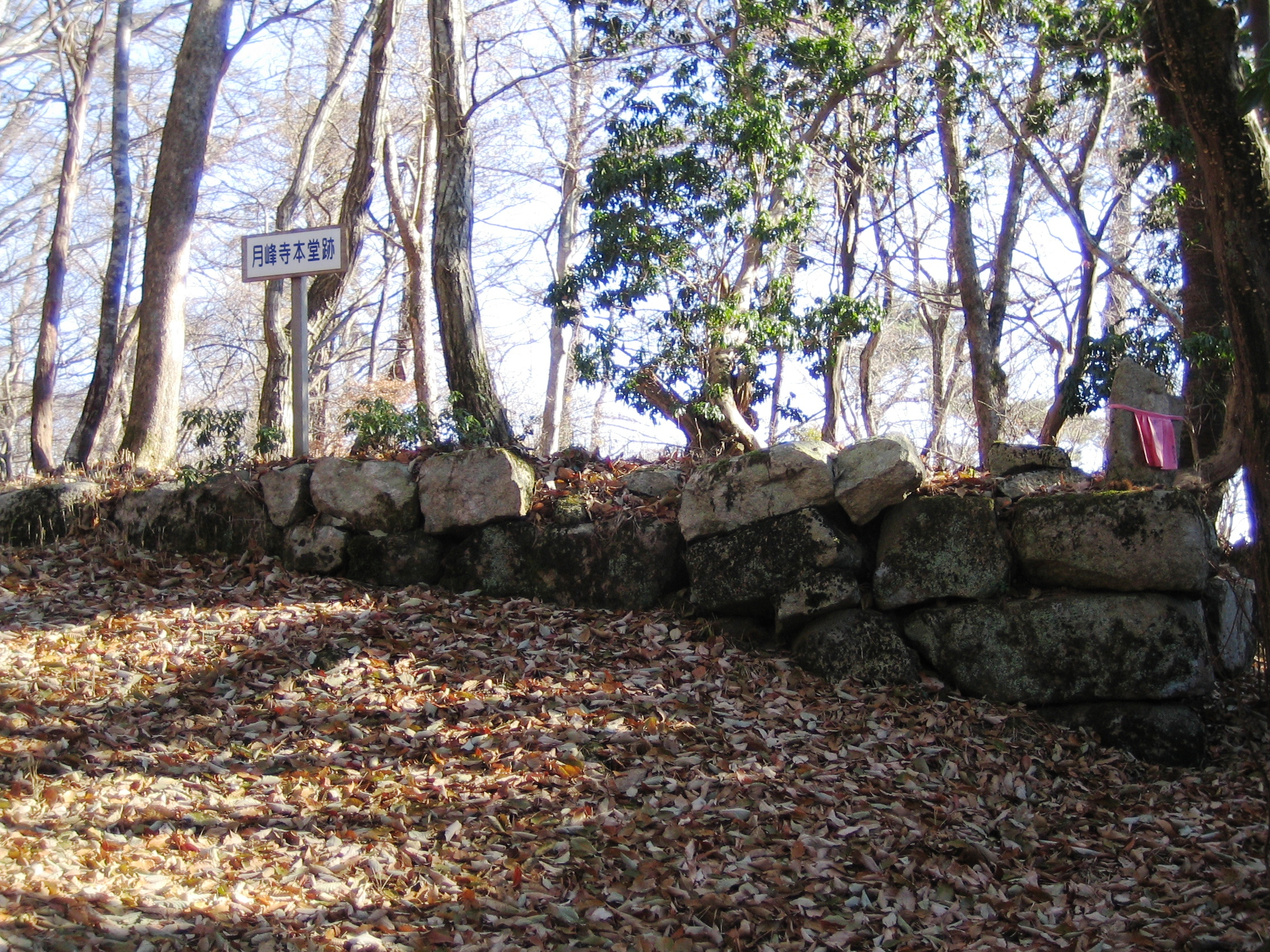
Ruins of the Main Building of Geppo-ji temple
