= Hokusetsu Prefectural Natural Park =

Natural Park

- 大阪府立北摂自然公園
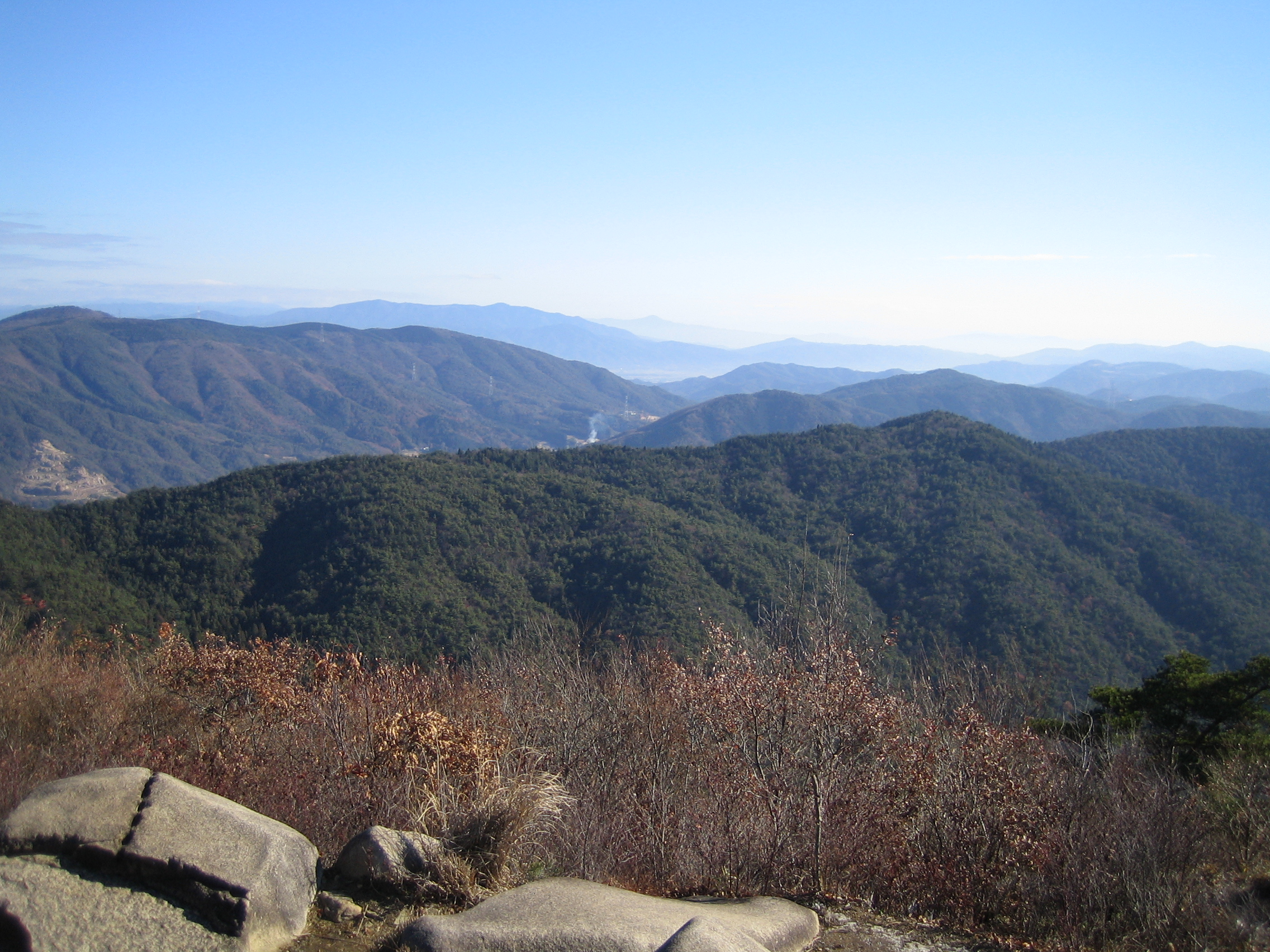
- Mount Kenpi

- Location within Osaka Prefecture Location within Japan
- Location: Ōsaka Prefecture, Japan
- Coordinates: 34.9583°N 135.475°E
- Area: 25.94 km^{2} (10.02 sq mi)
- Established: August 2001

Hokusetsu Prefectural Natural Park (大阪府立北摂自然公園, Osaka Prefectural Hokusetsu Natural Park) is a Prefectural Natural Park in the mountains and foothills of northeast Ōsaka Prefecture, Japan. Established in 2001, the park comprises ten non-contiguous areas scattered over the municipalities of Ibaraki, Minō, Nose, Shimamoto, Takatsuki and Toyono.

== See also ==
- National Parks of Japan
- Kongō-Ikoma-Kisen Quasi-National Park
- Meiji no Mori Minō Quasi-National Park
- Hannan-Misaki Prefectural Natural Park
- Satoyama
