= Osaka Prefecture =

Prefecture of Japan

Osaka Prefecture 大阪府
- Prefecture

Japanese transcription(s)
  - Japanese: 大阪府
  - Rōmaji: Ōsaka-fu
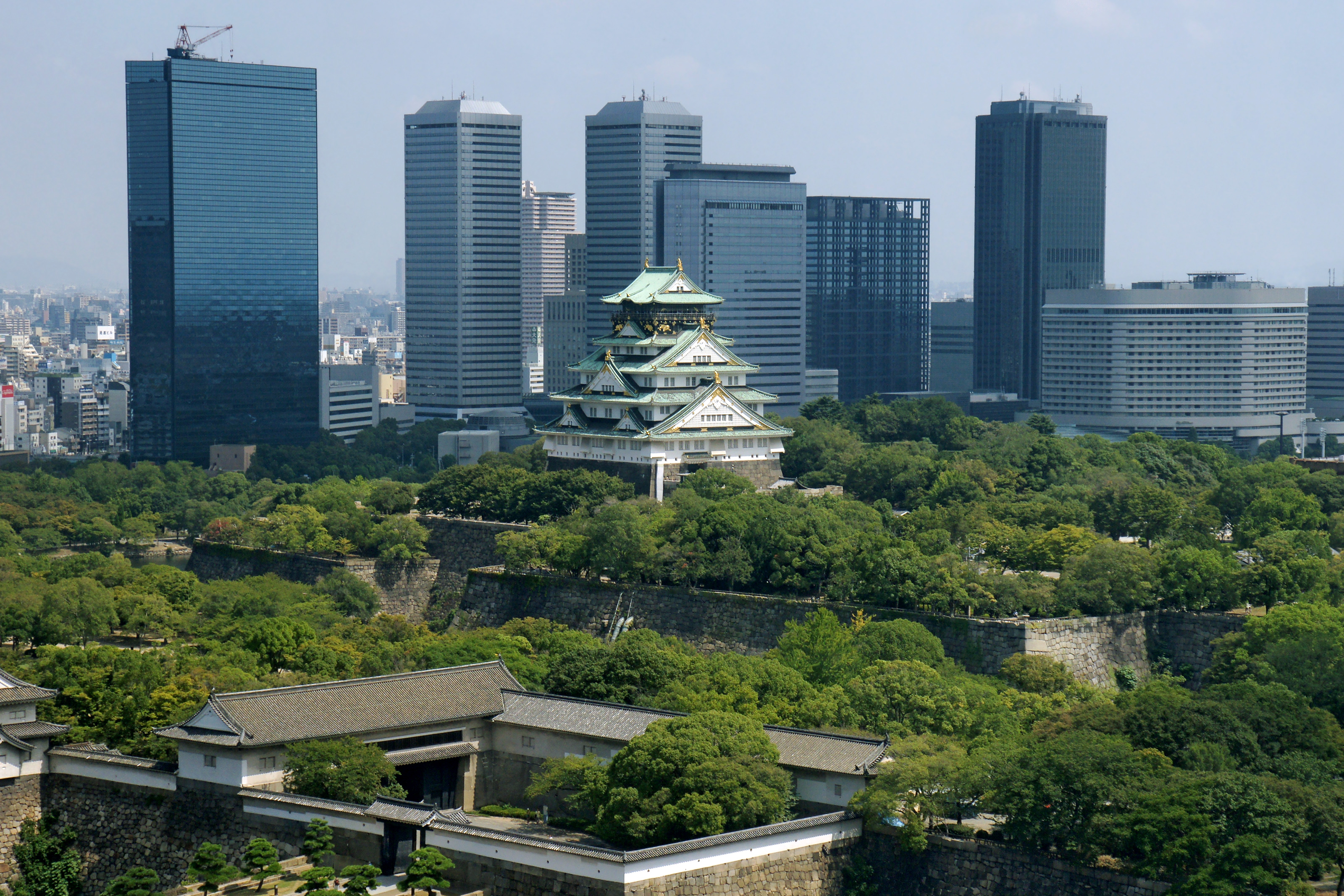
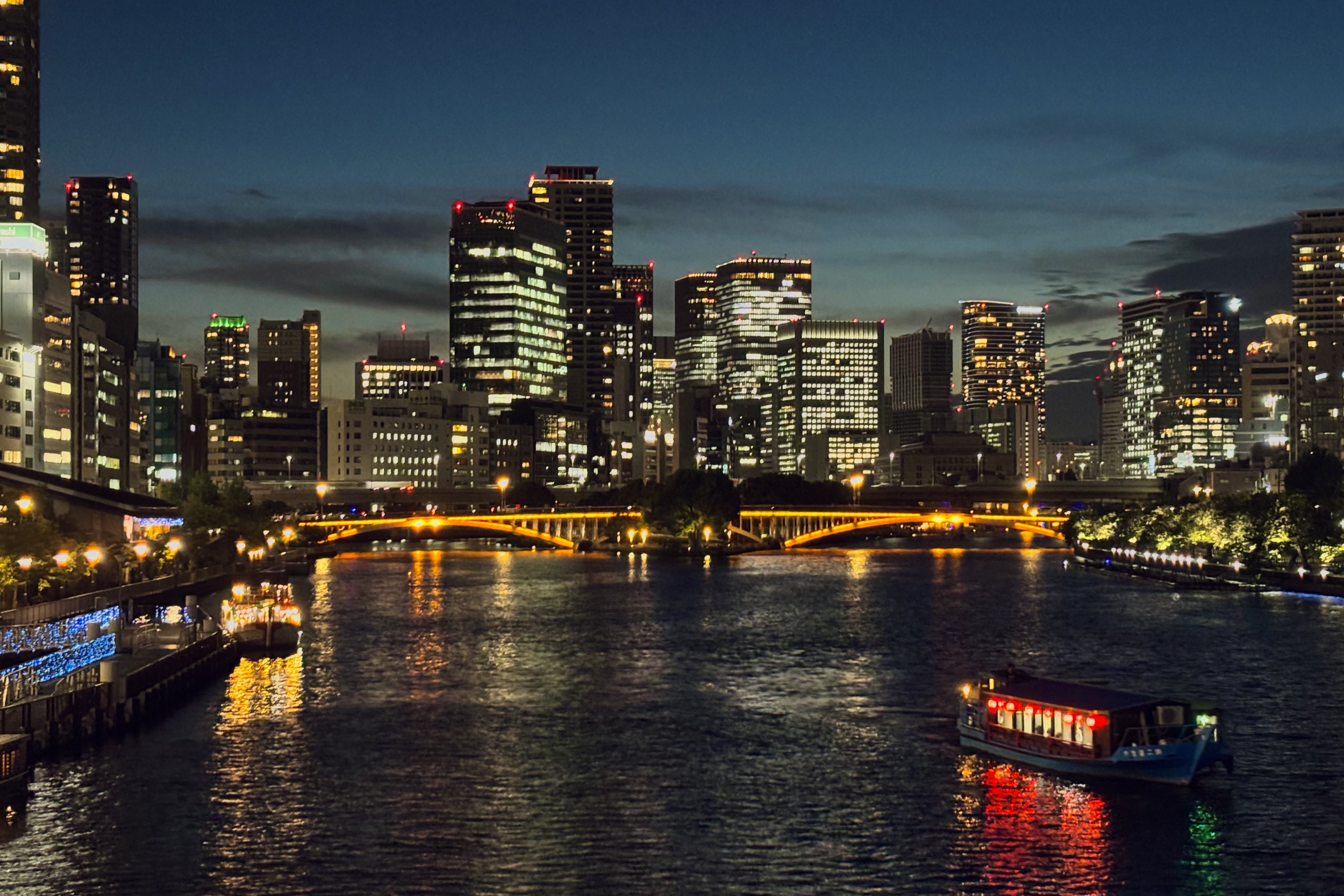
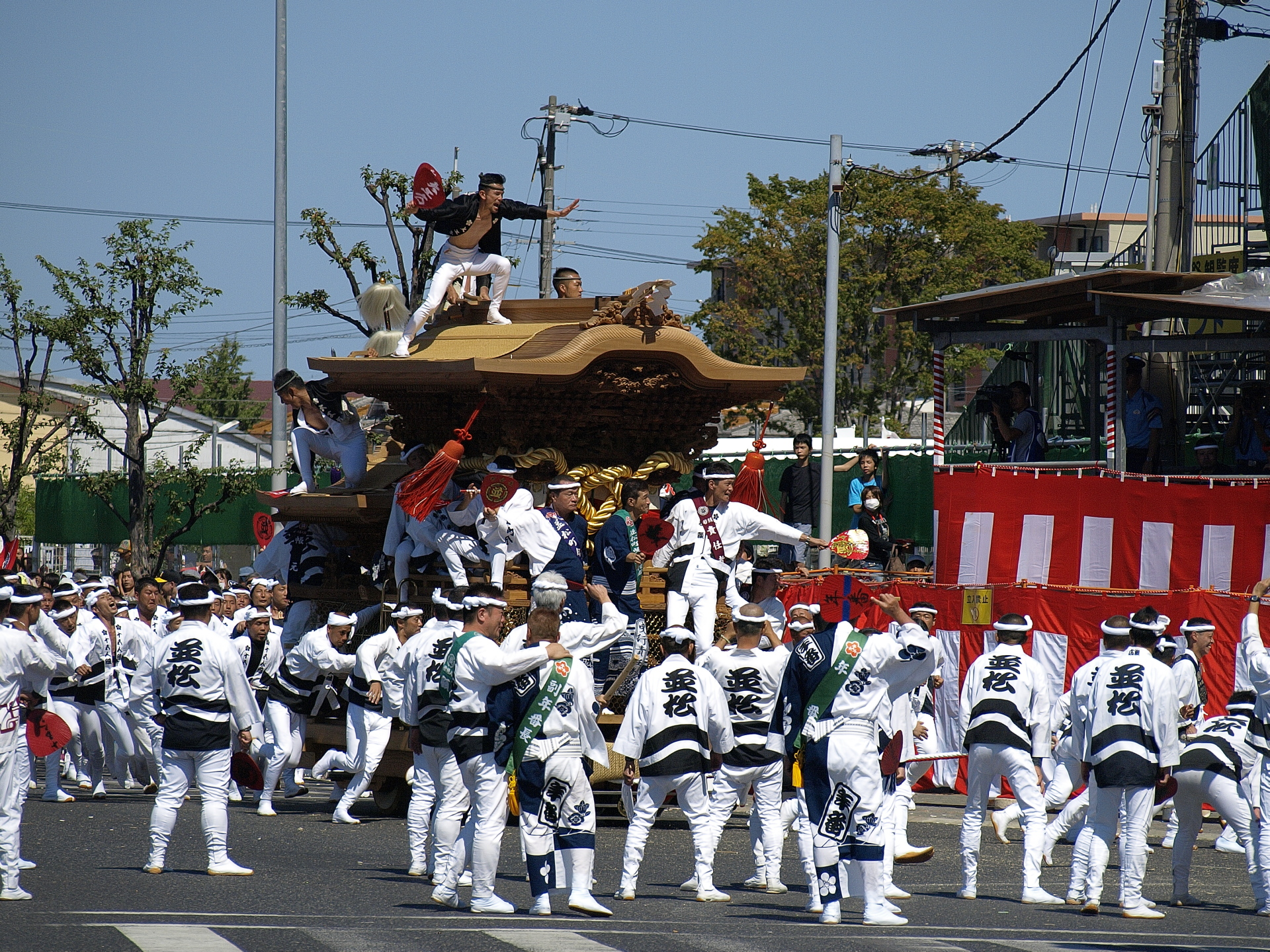
- Skyline of Osaka with the Osaka Castle and Osaka Business Park Dōtonbori Nakanoshima Kishiwada Danjiri Matsuri Mozu Kofun Group

- Flag Symbol

- Interactive map of Osaka Prefecture
- Coordinates: 34°41′11″N 135°31′12″E
- Country: Japan
- Region: Kansai
- Island: Honshu
- Capital: Osaka
- Subdivisions: Districts: 5, Municipalities: 43

Government
  - Governor: Hirofumi Yoshimura

Area
  - Total: 1,905.14 km^{2} (735.58 sq mi)
  - Rank: 46th

Population (1 July 2019)
  - Total: 8,823,358
  - Rank: 3rd
  - Density: 4,631.34/km^{2} (11,995.1/sq mi)

GDP (2022)
  - Total: JP¥43,124 billion US$318.6 billion
- ISO 3166 code: JP-27
- Website: www.pref.osaka.lg.jp.e.agb.hp.transer.com
- Symbols of Japan
- Bird: Bull-headed shrike (Lanius bucephalus)
- Flower: Japanese apricot (Prunus mume); Primrose (Primula sieboldii)
- Tree: Ginkgo tree (Ginkgo biloba)

Osaka Prefecture (大阪府, Ōsaka-fu; pronounced [ò̞ó̞.sä́.kä́(.ɸɯ̈̀), ó̞ó̞-]) is a prefecture of Japan located in the Kansai region of Honshu. Osaka Prefecture has a population of 8,778,035 (as of 1 April 2022) and has a geographic area of 1,905 square kilometres (736 sq mi). Osaka Prefecture borders Hyōgo Prefecture to the northwest, Kyoto Prefecture to the northeast, Nara Prefecture to the southeast, and Wakayama Prefecture to the south.

Osaka is the capital and largest city of Osaka Prefecture, and the third-largest city in Japan, with other major cities including Sakai, Higashiōsaka, and Hirakata. Osaka Prefecture is located on the western coast of the Kii Peninsula, forming the western is open to Osaka Bay. Osaka Prefecture is the third-most-populous prefecture, but by geographic area the second-smallest; at 4,600 inhabitants per square kilometre (12,000/sq mi) it is the second-most densely populated, below only Tokyo. Osaka Prefecture is one of Japan's two "urban prefectures" using the designation fu (府) rather than the standard ken for prefectures, along with Kyoto Prefecture. Osaka Prefecture forms the center of the Keihanshin metropolitan area, the second-most-populated urban region in Japan after the Greater Tokyo area and one of the world's most productive regions by GDP.

== History ==
Historical population
Year	Pop.	±% p.a.
1890	1,324,216	—
1903	1,823,456	+2.49%
1913	2,461,067	+3.04%
1920	2,587,847	+0.72%
1925	3,059,502	+3.41%
1930	3,540,017	+2.96%
1935	4,297,174	+3.95%
1940	4,792,966	+2.21%
1945	2,800,958	−10.19%
1950	3,857,047	+6.61%
1955	4,618,308	+3.67%
1960	5,504,746	+3.57%
1965	6,657,189	+3.87%
1970	7,620,480	+2.74%
1975	8,278,925	+1.67%
1980	8,473,446	+0.47%
1985	8,668,095	+0.46%
1990	8,734,516	+0.15%
1995	8,797,268	+0.14%
2000	8,805,081	+0.02%
2005	8,817,166	+0.03%
2010	8,865,245	+0.11%
2015	8,838,908	−0.06%

Prior to the Meiji Restoration, the modern-day area of Osaka Prefecture was split between Kawachi, Izumi, and Settsu provinces.

Osaka Prefecture was created on June 21, 1868, at the very beginning of the Meiji era. During the instigation of Fuhanken Sanchisei in 1868, the prefecture received its suffix fu, designating it as a prefecture.

On September 1, 1956, the city of Osaka was promoted to a city designated by government ordinance and thereby divided into 24 wards. Sakai became the second city in the prefecture to be promoted to a city designated by government ordinance on April 1, 2006, and was divided into seven wards.

In 2000, Fusae Ota became Japan's first female governor when she replaced Knock Yokoyama, who resigned after prosecution for sexual harassment. Tōru Hashimoto, previously famous as a counselor on television, was elected in 2008 at the age of 38, becoming the youngest governor in Japan.

On June 18, 2018, an earthquake struck the northern region of the prefecture. It killed 4 people and caused minor damage across Greater Osaka.

=== Proposed reorganisation ===
In 2010, the Osaka Restoration Association was created with backing by Governor Tōru Hashimoto, with hopes of reforming Osaka Prefecture into the Osaka Metropolis and merging with the City of Osaka. In the 2011 local elections, the association was able to win the majority of the prefectural seats and Hashimoto was elected as mayor of Osaka.

A referendum on the issue was held in 2015 and was defeated with 50.38% of voters opposed to the plan. A second referendum in 2020 was rejected by 50.6% of voters.

== Geography ==
Osaka Prefecture neighbors the prefectures of Hyōgo and Kyoto in the north, Nara in the east and Wakayama in the south. The Yodo and Yamato Rivers flow through the prefecture.

Prior to the construction of Kansai International Airport, Osaka was the smallest prefecture in Japan. The artificial island on which the airport was built added enough area to make it slightly larger than Kagawa Prefecture.

As of 1 April 2012, 11% of the total land area of the prefecture was designated as Natural Parks, namely Kongō-Ikoma-Kisen and Meiji no Mori Minō Quasi-National Parks and Hokusetsu and Hannan-Misaki Prefectural Natural Parks.

=== Municipalities ===
Map of Osaka Prefecture Government Ordinance Designated City City Town Village

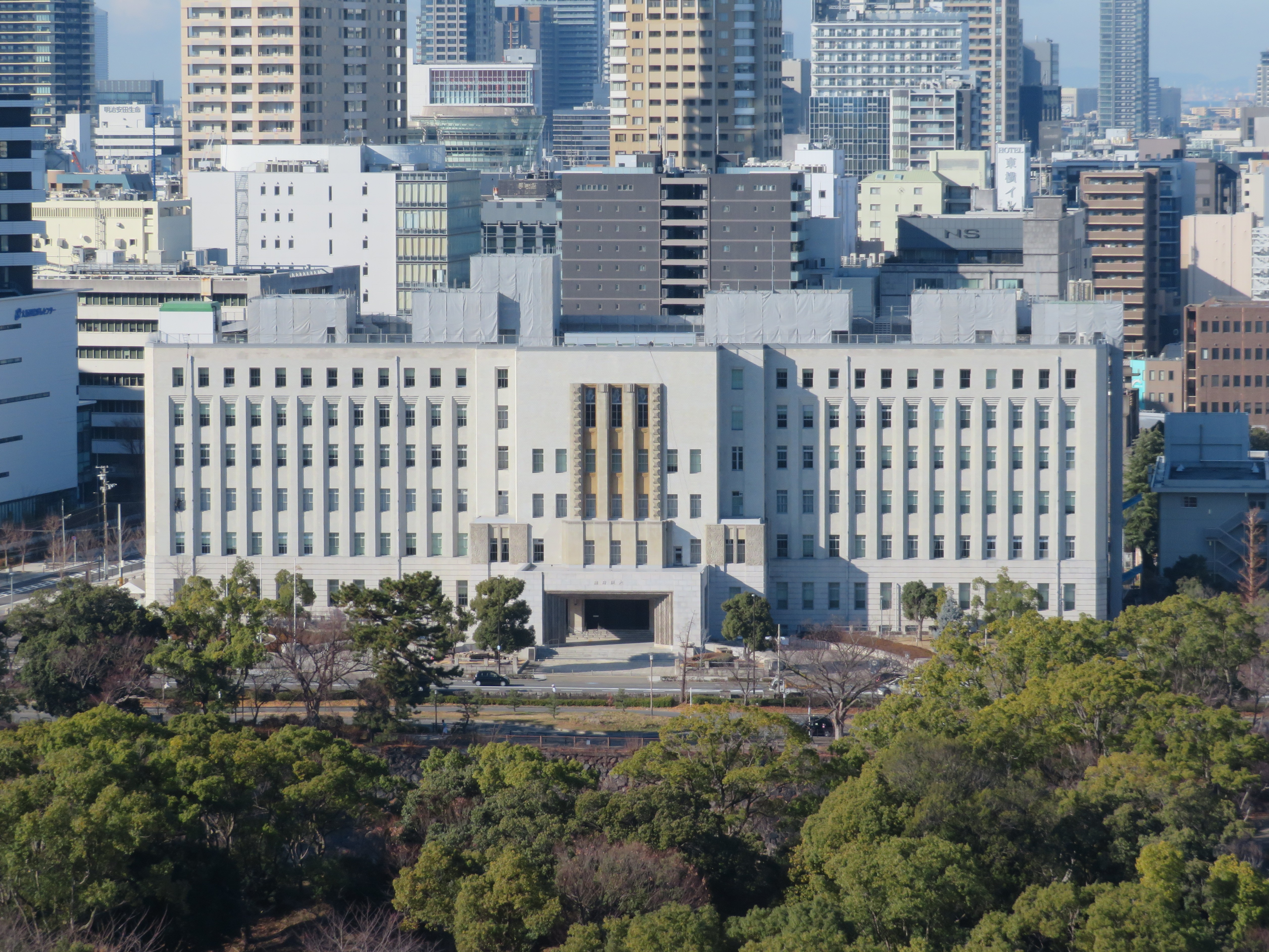
Osaka Prefectural Office

Sakai and Daisenryo Kofun Mozu Tomb

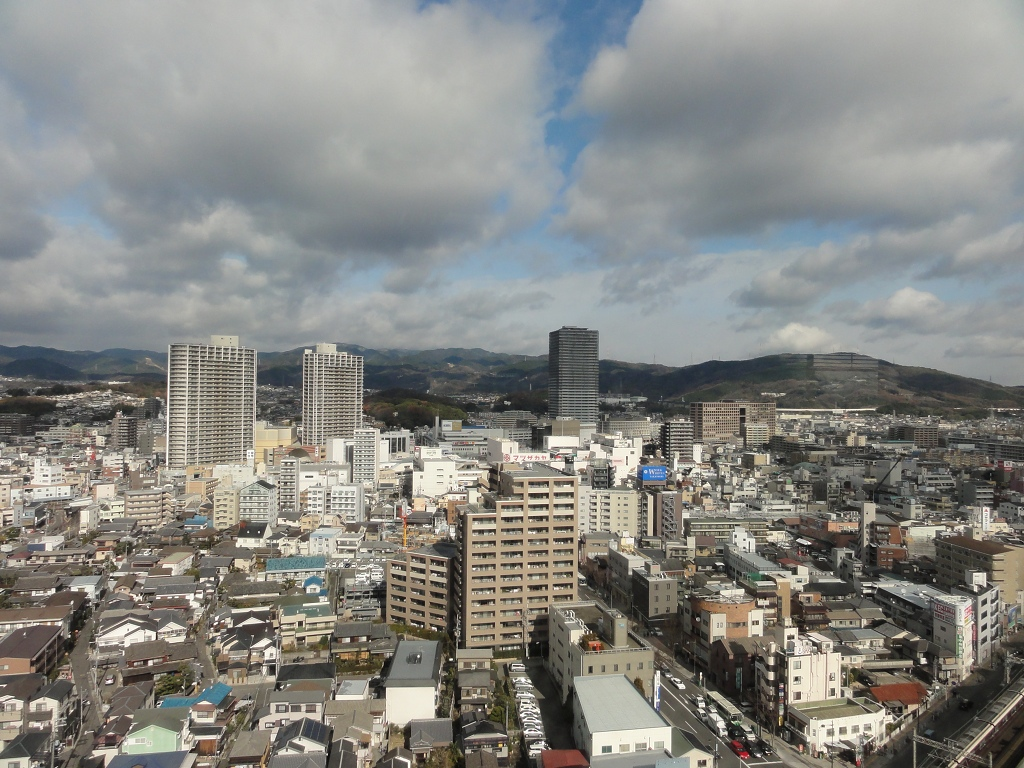
Takatsuki

Since 2005, Osaka consists of 43 municipalities: 33 cities, nine towns and one village. As of 2021, the 33 cities include two designated major cities, seven core cities and two (transitional) special case cities (after legal abolition in 2015, to be replaced with the core city system in the 2020s).

Flag, name w/o suffix	Full name			District (-gun)	Area (km^{2})	Population	Map	LPE code (w/o pref. [27...], checksum [-x])
Flag, name w/o suffix	Japanese	transcription	translation	District (-gun)	Area (km^{2})	Population	Map	LPE code (w/o pref. [27...], checksum [-x])
Daitō	大東市	Daitō-shi	Daitō City	–	18.27	119,329		218
Fujidera	藤井寺市	Fujidera-shi	Fujidera City	–	8.89	65,075		226
Habikino	羽曳野市	Habikino-shi	Habikino City	–	26.44	113,256		222
Hannan	阪南市	Hannan-shi	Hannan City	–	36.1	55,798		232
Higashiōsaka	東大阪市	Higashi-Ōsaka-shi	Higashi-Osaka City (East Osaka City)	–	61.78	495,011		227
Hirakata	枚方市	Hirakata-shi	Hirakata City	–	65.08	401,449		210
Ibaraki	茨木市	Ibaraki-shi	Ibaraki City	–	76.52	280,562		211
Ikeda	池田市	Ikeda-shi	Ikeda City	–	22.09	103,028		204
Izumi	和泉市	Izumi-shi	Izumi City	–	84.98	186,370		219
Izumiōtsu	泉大津市	Izumi-Ōtsu-shi	Izumi-Ōtsu City (as opposed to Ōtsu City in Ōmi Province)	–	13.36	75,398		206
Izumisano	泉佐野市	Izumi-Sano-shi	Izumi-Sano City (as opposed to Sano City in Shimotsuke Province)	–	55.03	100,649		213
Kadoma	門真市	Kadoma-shi	Kadoma City	–	12.28	124,516		223
Kaizuka	貝塚市	Kaizuka-shi	Kaizuka City	–	43.99	88,345		208
Kashiwara	柏原市	Kashiwara-shi	Kashiwara City	–	25.39	76,383		221
Katano	交野市	Katano-shi	Katano City	–	25.55	76,383		230
Kawachinagano	河内長野市	Kawachi-Nagano-shi	Kawachi-Nagano City (as opposed to Nagano City in Shinano Province)	–	109.61	105,872		216
Kishiwada	岸和田市	Kishiwada-shi	Kishiwada City	–	72.68	197,629		202
Matsubara	松原市	Matsubarashi	Matsubara City	–	16.66	121,125		217
Minoh	箕面市	Minoo-shi	Minoo City	–	47.84	134,435		220
Moriguchi	守口市	Moriguchi-shi	Moriguchi City	–	12.73	143,877		209
Neyagawa	寝屋川市	Neyagawa-shi	Neyagawa City	–	24.73	236,758		215
Osaka (capital)	大阪市	Ōsaka-shi	Osaka City	–	225.21	2,668,586		100
Ōsakasayama	大阪狭山市	Ōsaka-Sayama-shi	Osaka-Sayama City (as opposed to Sayama City in Saitama)	–	11.86	57,993		231
Sakai	堺市	Sakai-shi	Sakai City	–	149.82	828,741		140
Sennan	泉南市	Sennan-shi	Sennan City (Sen[shū] South City) (after Sennan District)	–	48.48	62,076		228
Settsu	摂津市	Settsu-shi	Settsu City	–	14.88	85,290		224
Shijōnawate	四條畷市	Shijōnawate-shi	Shijōnawate City	–	18.74	55,832		229
Suita	吹田市	Suita-shi	Suita City	–	36.11	378,322		205
Takaishi	高石市	Takaishi-shi	Takaishi City	–	11.35	56,583		225
Takatsuki	高槻市	Takatsuki-shi	Takatsuki City	–	105.31	350,914		207
Tondabayashi	富田林市	Tondabayashi-shi	Tondabayashi City	–	39.66	112,993		214
Toyonaka	豊中市	Toyonaka-shi	Toyonaka City	–	36.38	396,014		203
Yao	八尾市	Yaoshi	Yao City	–	41.71	268,013		212
Chihayaakasaka	千早赤阪村	Chihaya-Akasaka-mura	Chihaya-Akasaka Village	Minamikawachi	37.38	5,467		383
Kanan	河南町	Kanan-chō	Kanan Town	Minamikawachi	25.26	16,027		382
Taishi	太子町	Taishi-chō	Taishi Town	Minamikawachi	14.17	13,634		381
Kumatori	熊取町	Kumatori-chō	Kumatori Town	Sennan	17.23	43,988		361
Misaki	岬町	Misakichō	Misaki Town	Sennan	49.08	16,267		366
Tajiri	田尻町	Tajiri-chō	Tajiri Town	Sennan	4.96	8,377		362
Nose	能勢町	Nose-chō	Nose Town	Toyono	98.68	9,971		322
Toyono	豊能町	Toyono-chō	Toyono Town	Toyono	34.37	19,519		321
Shimamoto	島本町	Shimamoto-chō	Shimamoto Town	Mishima	16.78	29,970		301
Tadaoka	忠岡町	Tadaoka-chō	Tadaoka Town	Senboku	4.03	17,187		341
Osaka	大阪府	Ōsaka-fu	Osaka Prefecture	–	1,905.14	8,823,358		000 ISO: JP-27

=== Mergers ===
After the modern reactivation of districts in 1878/79, Osaka, including Sakai which was only merged into Osaka in 1881, consisted of 5 urban districts (-ku) and 27 rural districts (-gun), excluding 15 districts in Yamato Province which was later separated from Osaka as Nara Prefecture in 1887. When the prefectures were subdivided into modern municipalities in 1889, the five urban districts were turned into two district-independent cities: Osaka City and Sakai City, and Osaka's [rural] districts were subdivided into 12 towns and 310 villages. After Osaka City had absorbed many surrounding municipalities in the interwar/Taishō period, the number of municipalities in Osaka had already dropped to 149 by 1953. The Great Shōwa mergers of the 1950s reduced the total to 47 by 1961, including 26 cities by then. The current total of 43 was reached during the Great Heisei mergers in 2005.

== Economy ==
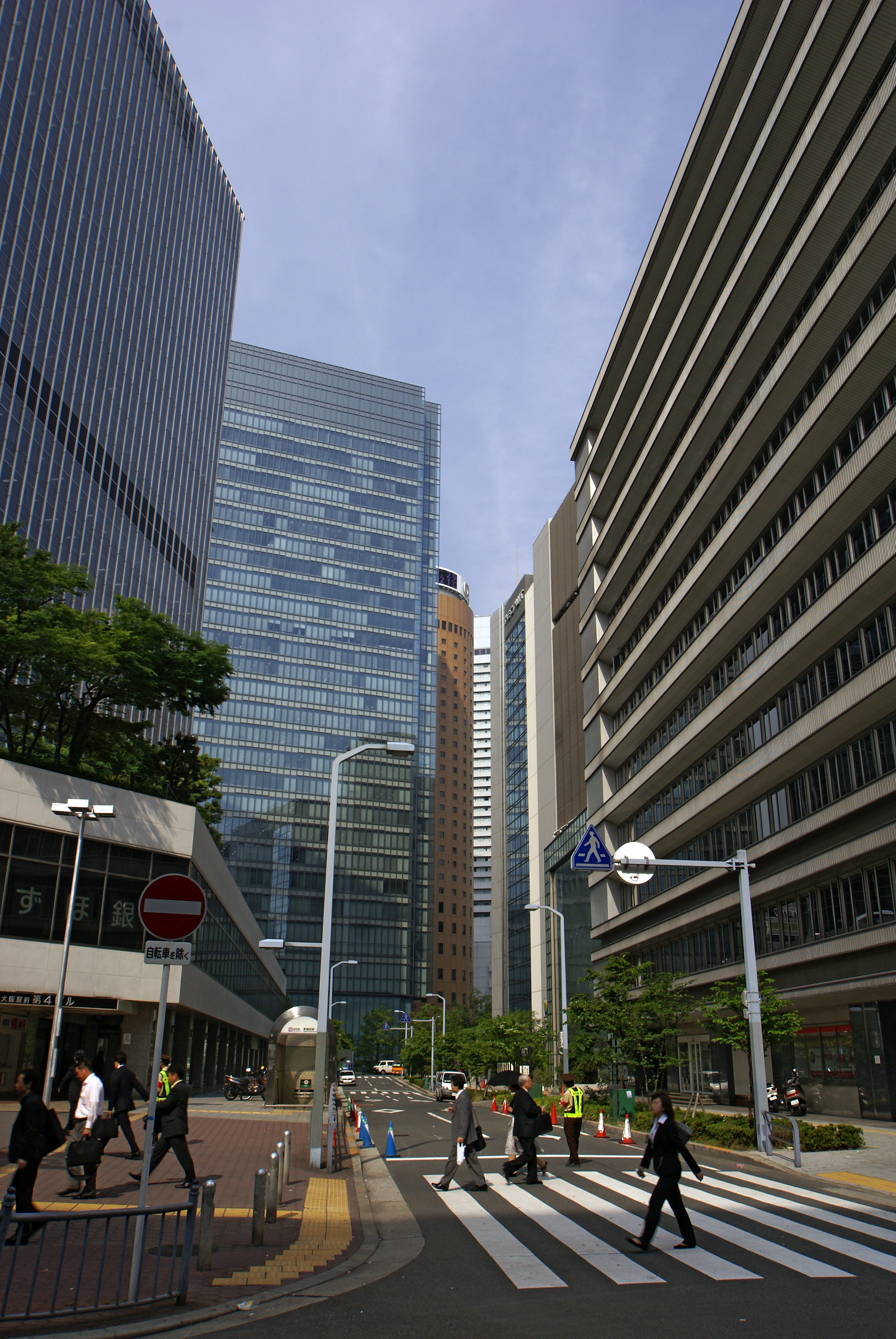
Diamond district in Umeda

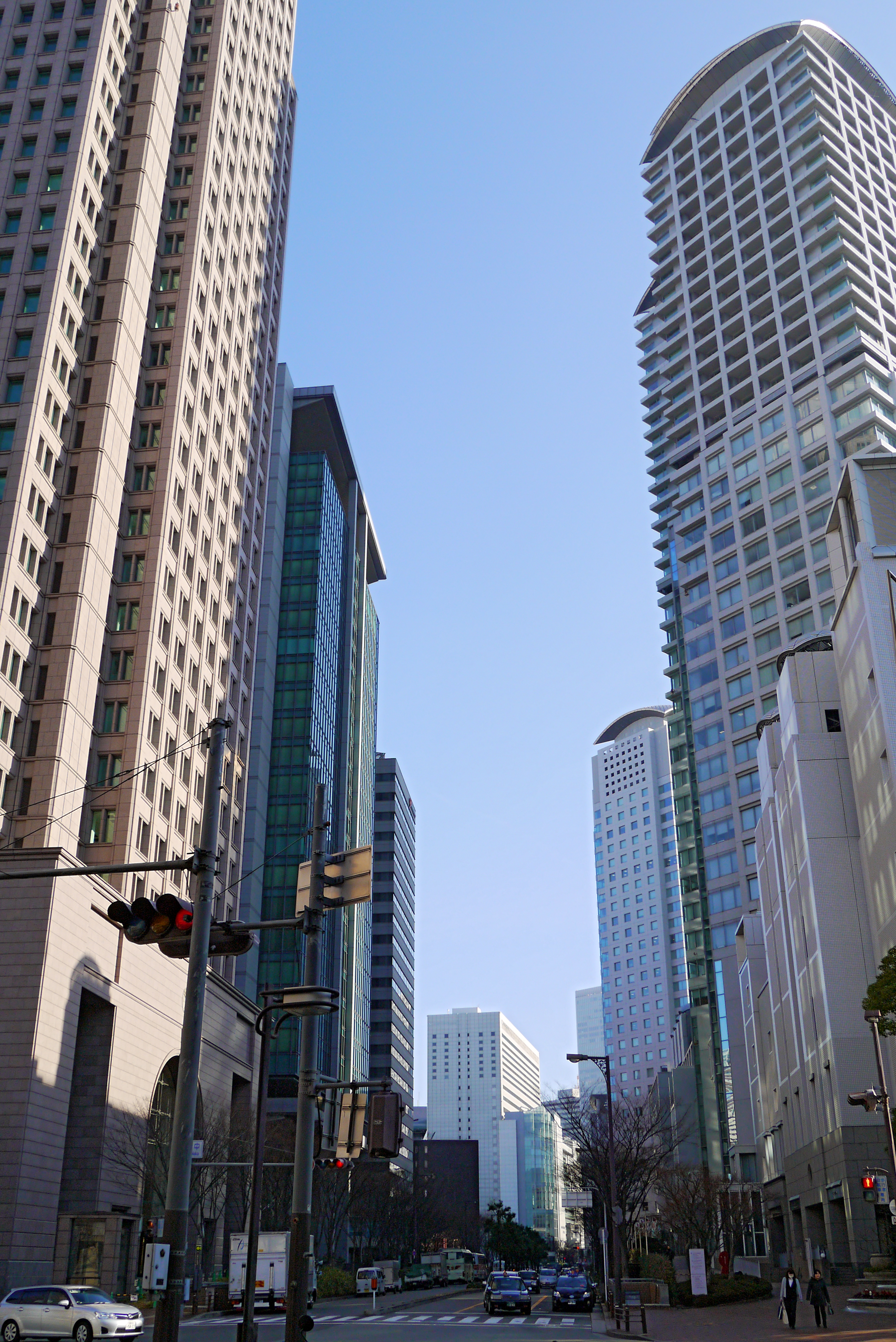
Osaka Garden City

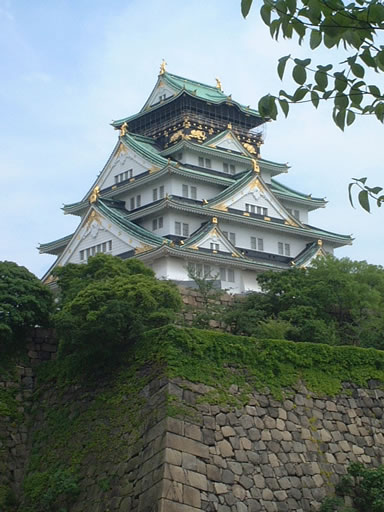
Osaka castle

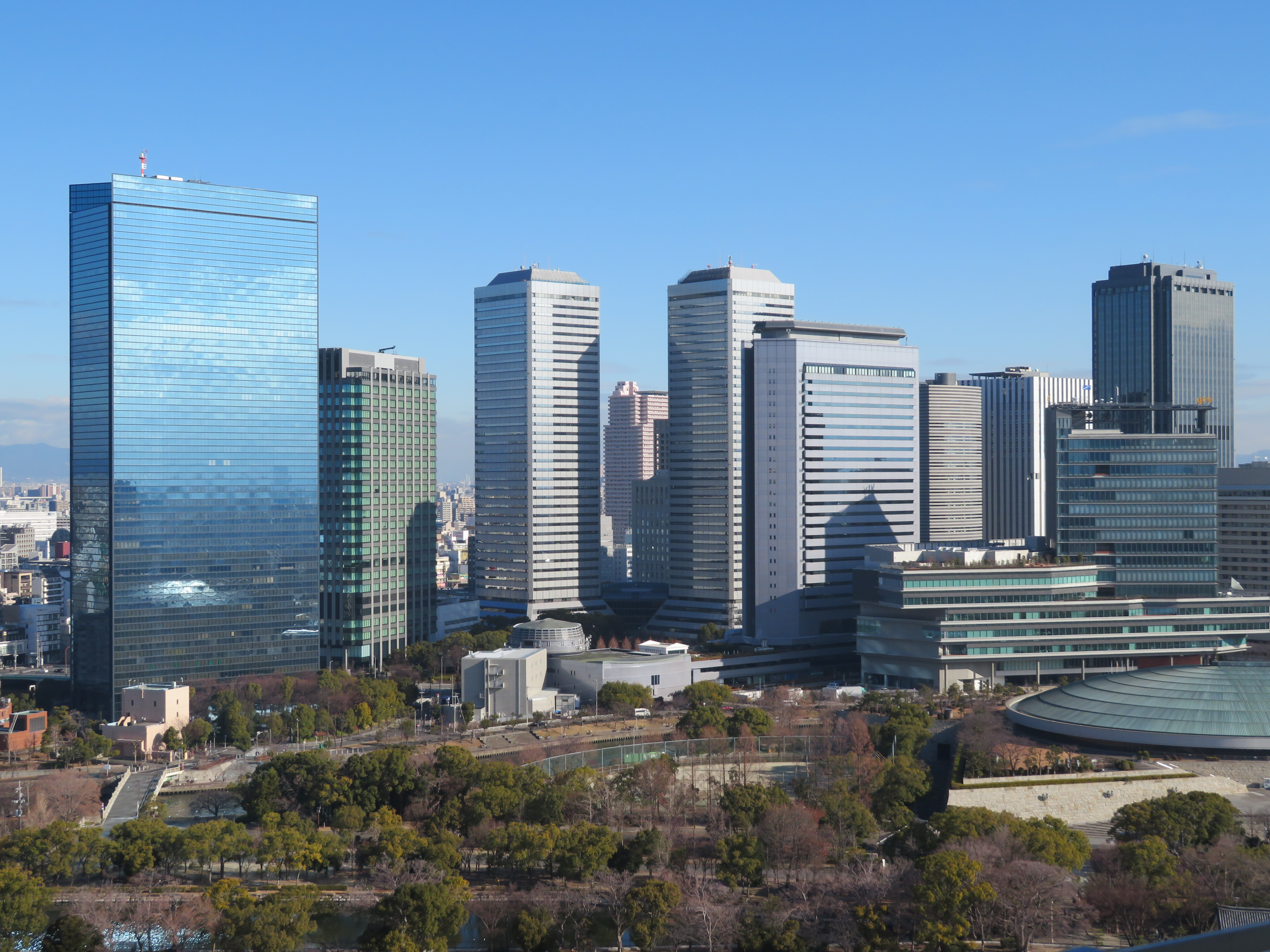
Osaka business park

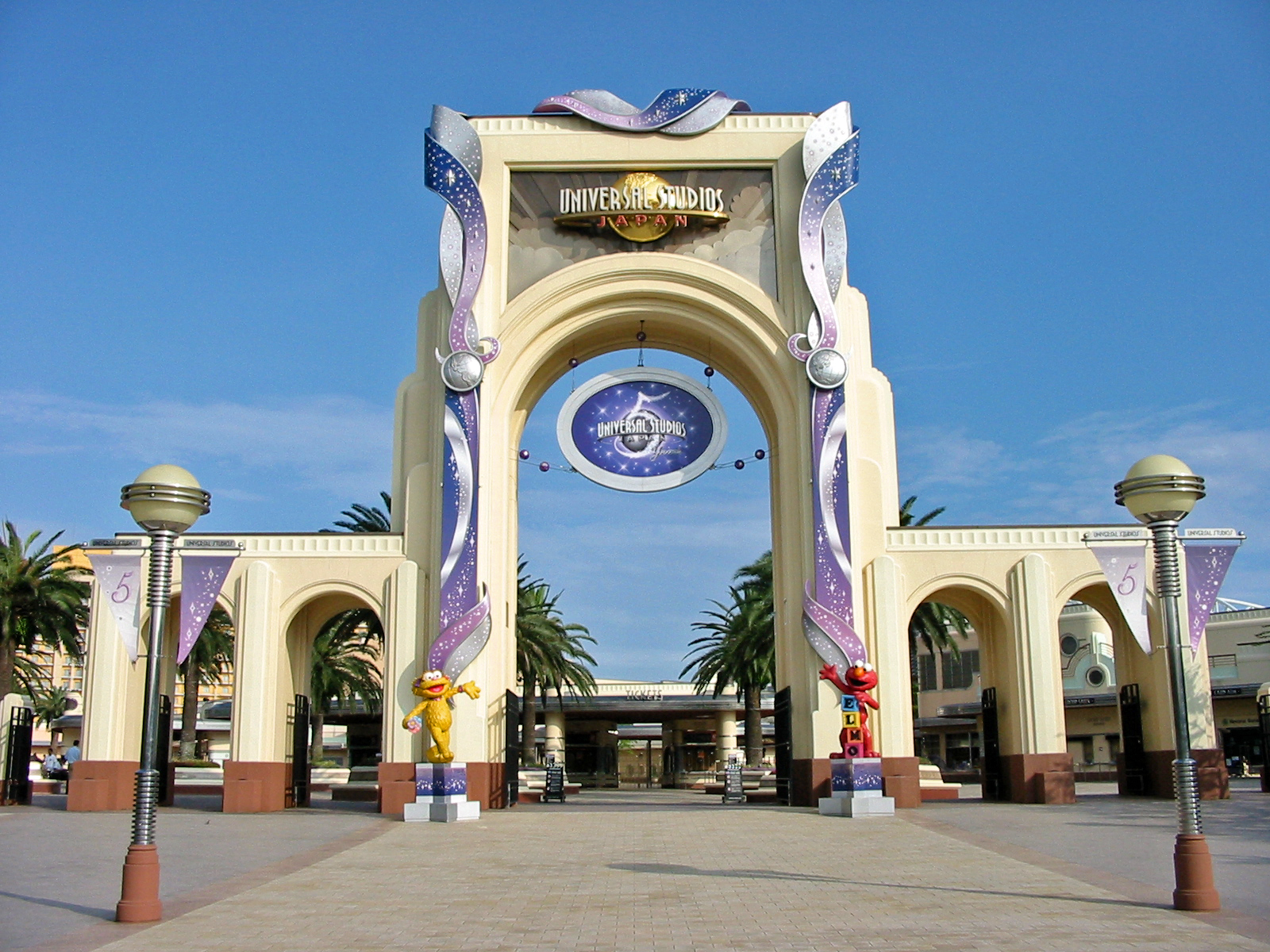
Universal Studios Japan

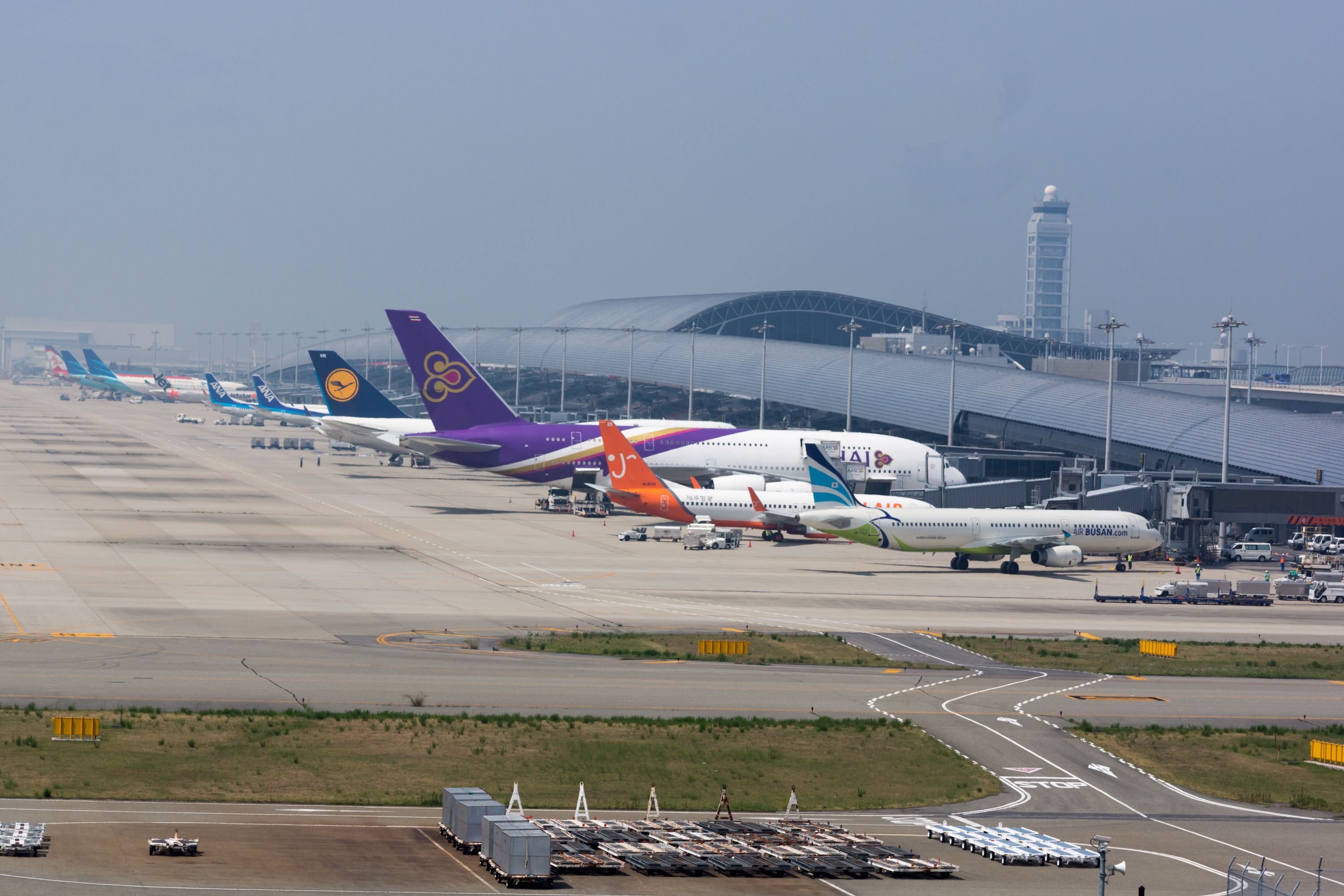
Kansai International Airport

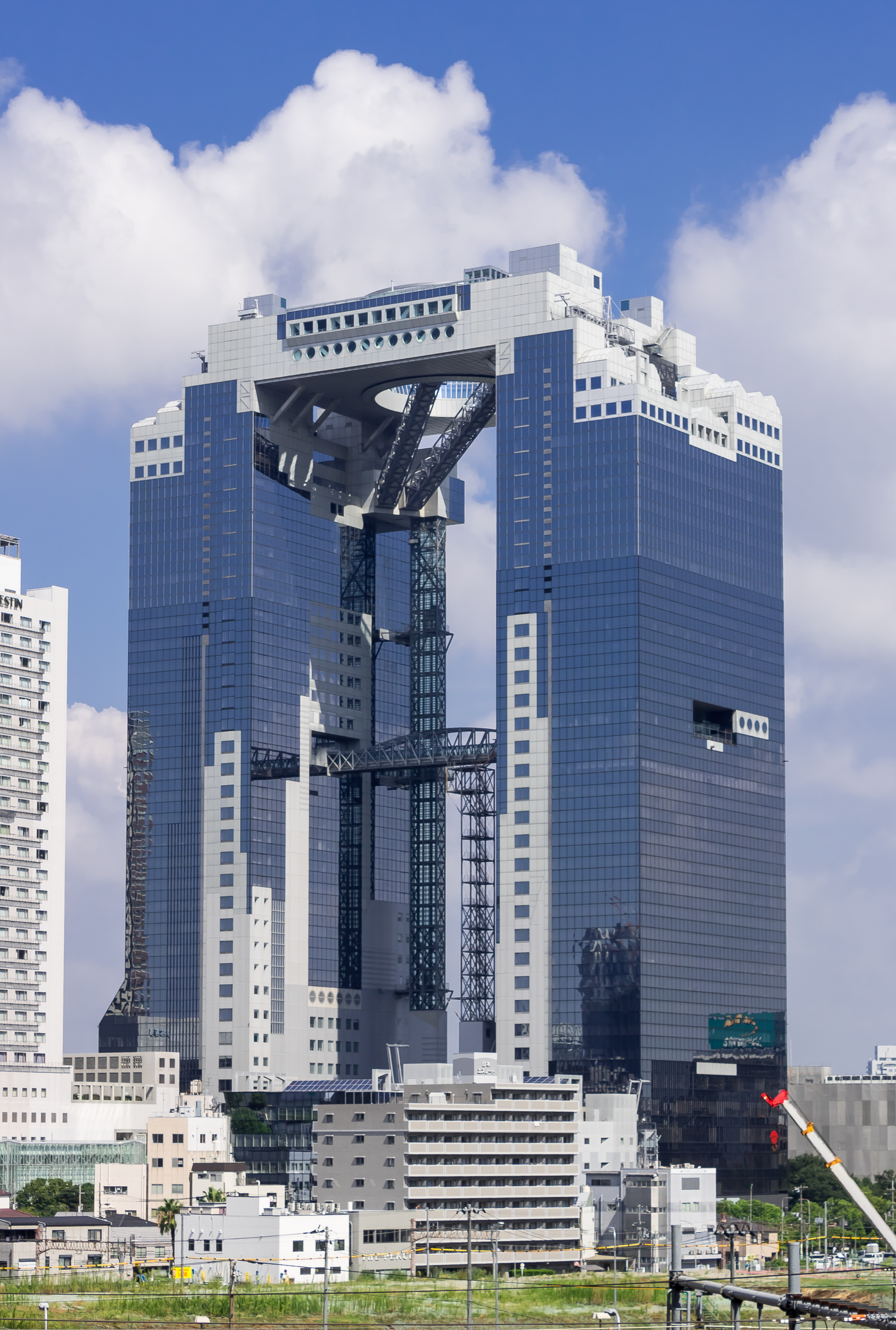
Umeda Sky Building

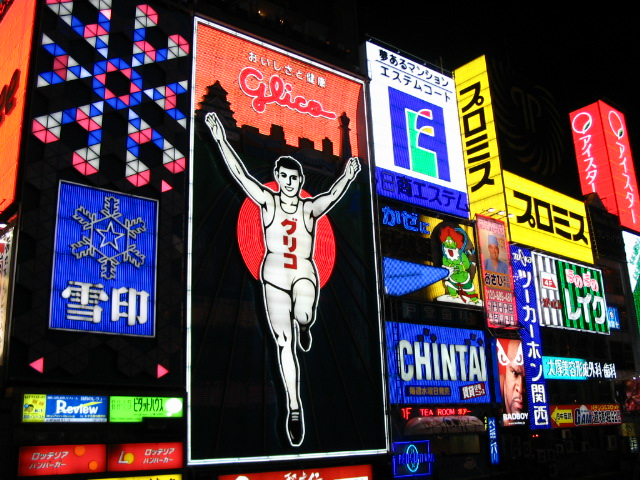
Famous advertisement by Glico man in Dōtonbori (middle-left)

The gross prefecture product of Osaka for the fiscal year 2004 was ¥38.7 trillion, second after Tokyo with an increase of 0.9% from the previous year. This represented approximately 48% of the Kinki region. The per capita income was ¥3.0 million, seventh in the nation. Commercial sales the same year was ¥60.1 trillion.

Overshadowed by such globally renowned electronics giants as Panasonic and Sharp, the other side of Osaka's economy can be characterized by its Small and Medium Enterprises (SMEs) activities. The number of SMEs based in Osaka in 2006 was 330,737, accounting for 99.6% of the total number of businesses in the prefecture. While this proportion is similar to other prefectures (the average nationwide was 99.7%), the manufactured output of the SMEs amounted to 65.4% of the total within the prefecture, a rate significantly higher than Tokyo's 55.5%, or Kanagawa's 38.4%. One model from Osaka of serving the public interest and restimulating the regional economy, combined with industry-education cooperation efforts, is the Astro-Technology SOHLA, with its artificial satellite project. Having originally started from a gathering of Higashiosaka based SMEs, Astro-Technology SOHLA has not only grown into a Kansai region-wide group but has also won support from the government, through technology and material support from Japan Aerospace Exploration Agency (JAXA), and financial support from NEDO.

The Osaka Securities Exchange, specializing in derivatives such as Nikkei 225 Futures, is based in Osaka.

There are many electrical, chemical, pharmaceutical, heavy industry, food, and housing companies in Osaka Prefecture.

Osaka city skyline at dusk viewed from the Umeda Sky Building

== Demographics ==
Osaka prefecture population pyramid in 2020

According to the 2005 Population Census of Japan, Osaka prefecture has a population of 8,817,166, an increase of 12,085, or 0.14%, since the Census of year 2000.

As of 2022, the prefecture has about 93,000 ethnic Korean persons, the largest such population of any prefecture in Japan. As of 2013, most ethnic Korean children attend ordinary Japanese public schools, although some Korean schools operated by the Chongryon and classes for ethnic Koreans had opened in the prefecture. During the Japanese rule of Korea many ethnic Koreans came to the Osaka area to look for work. Many people from Jeju came to the Osaka area after a 1922 ferry line between Osaka and Jeju opened. During World War II Japanese authorities forced additional ethnic Koreans to move to the Osaka area.

== Temples and shrines ==
- Shitennō-ji
- Kanshin-ji
- Sumiyoshi Taisha

== Museums ==
- National Museum of Ethnology, Japan
- Open-Air Museum of Old Japanese Farm Houses (Hattori Ryokuchi Park)
- OSTEC (Osaka Science and Technology Center) Exhibition Hall
- Japan Folk Crafts Museum, Osaka 大阪日本民芸館

== Education ==
Public elementary and junior high schools in the prefecture are operated by the municipalities. Public high schools are operated by the Osaka Prefectural Board of Education.

=== Universities ===
- Hagoromo University of International Studies (Sakai)
- Hannan University (Matsubara)
- Kansai Gaidai University (Hirakata) (Kansai University of Foreign Studies)
- Kansai Medical University (Hirakata, Osaka)
- Kansai University (Suita, Takatsuki, Osaka city)
- Kindai University (Higashiosaka)
- Osaka University (Toyonaka and Suita)
- Osaka University of Arts (Kanan)
- Osaka University of Economics (Osaka)
- former Osaka University of Foreign Studies (Minoh)
- Osaka Kyoiku University (Kashiwara)
- Osaka City University (Osaka city)
- Osaka Prefecture University (Sakai)
- Osaka International Educational University (Moriguchi)
- Osaka University of Health and Sport sciences (Kumatori)
- Osaka University of Commerce (Higashiosaka)
- Osaka University of Economic and Law (Yao)
- Osaka College of Music (Toyonaka)
- Osaka Electro Communication University (Neyagawa)
- Osaka Gakuin University (Suita)
- Otemon Gakuin University (Ibaraki)
- Setsunan University (Neyagawa)
- St Andrews University (Momoyama Gakuin University) (Izumi)
- Taisei Gakuin University (Mihara, Sakai)
- Tezukayama Gakuin University (Ōsakasayama, Sakai)

== Parks ==
- The Expo Commemoration Park (Suita) held the Expo '70. It is about 260 ha and includes a Japanese garden, National Museum of Art, Osaka, and the amusement park "Expoland".
- Hattori Ryokuchi Park (Toyonaka), about 150 ha.
- Tsurumi Ryokuchi Park (Osaka), about 100 ha. The horticulture exposition of Expo '90 was held here.
- Nagai Park (Osaka), about 66 ha. The IAAF World Championships in Athletics were held in 2007 at Nagai Stadium in this park.
- Osaka Castle Park (Osaka), about 106 ha.
- Nakanoshima Park (Osaka), housing the Museum of Oriental Ceramics, public hall, Osaka Prefectural Nakanoshima Library, and the city hall of Osaka.
- Yamadaike Park (Osaka), about 73.7 ha.
- Osaka Prefectural Park (Hirakata), operated by Osaka Prefecture.

== Transportation ==
=== Rail ===
- JR Central
  - Tokaido Shinkansen (Shin-Osaka Station)
- JR West
  - Sanyo Shinkansen (Shin-Osaka Station)
  - Osaka Loop Line
  - Osaka Higashi Line
  - Tokaido Main Line
    - JR Kyoto Line
    - JR Kobe Line
  - Gakkentoshi Line
  - Yamatoji Line
  - Hanwa Line
  - JR Tozai Line
  - JR Yumesaki Line
  - Kansai Airport Line
- Osaka Metro
  - Midosuji Line
  - Tanimachi Line
  - Yotsubashi Line
  - Chuo Line
  - Sennichimae Line
  - Sakaisuji Line
  - Nagahori Tsurumi-ryokuchi Line
  - Imazatosuji Line
- Keihan Electric Railway
  - Keihan Main Line
  - Keihan Nakanoshima Line
  - Keihan Katano Line
- Kintetsu
  - Osaka Line
  - Nara Line
  - Shigi Line
  - Keihanna Line
  - Minami Osaka Line
  - Domyoji Line
  - Nagano Line
- Hankyu
  - Hankyu Kyoto Line
  - Hankyu Senri Line
  - Hankyu Takarazuka Line
  - Hankyu Minoo Line
  - Hankyu Kobe Line
- Nose Electric Railway
- Hanshin Electric Railway
  - Hanshin Main Line
  - Hanshin Namba Line
- Nankai Electric Railway
  - Nankai Main Line
  - Takashinohama Line
  - Tanagawa Line
  - Airport Line
  - Koya Line
  - Semboku Line
- Mizuma Railway
- Kita-Osaka Kyuko Railway

=== People movers ===
- Osaka Monorail
- Nanko Port Town Line

=== Road ===
The four license plates in Osaka: 大阪 (Ōsaka) in Northern Osaka なにわ (Naniwa) in Osaka City, named Naniwa as Imperial capital in antiquity 和泉 (Izumi) in Southern Osaka≈Izumi Province+Southern Kawachi 堺 (Sakai) in Sakai City

==== Expressways ====
- Meishin Expressway
- Chugoku Expressway
- Hanshin Expressway
- Nishi-Meihan Expressway
- Second Keihan Highway
- Hanwa Expressway
- Second Hanna Highway
- Minami Hanna Highway

==== National highways ====
- National Route 1
- National Route 2
- National Route 25
- National Route 26
- National Route 43
- National Route 163
- National Route 165
- National Route 166
- National Route 168
- National Route 170
- National Route 171
- National Route 173
- National Route 176
- National Route 307
- National Route 308
- National Route 309
- National Route 310
- National Route 371
- National Route 423
- National Route 477
- National Route 479
- National Route 480
- National Route 481

=== Airports ===
- Osaka International Airport - Domestic flights
- Kansai International Airport - International and domestic flights

== Sister regions ==
Osaka Prefecture has sister region relationships with:

- Shanghai, China (1980)
- East Java, Indonesia (1984)
- Rotterdam, Netherlands (1984)
- Val-d'Oise, France (1987)
- Queensland, Australia (1988)
- Primorsky Krai, Russia (1992)
- California, United States (1994)
- Lombardy, Italy (2002)
- Dubai, United Arab Emirates (2002)
- Ho Chi Minh City, Vietnam (2007)

== Sports ==
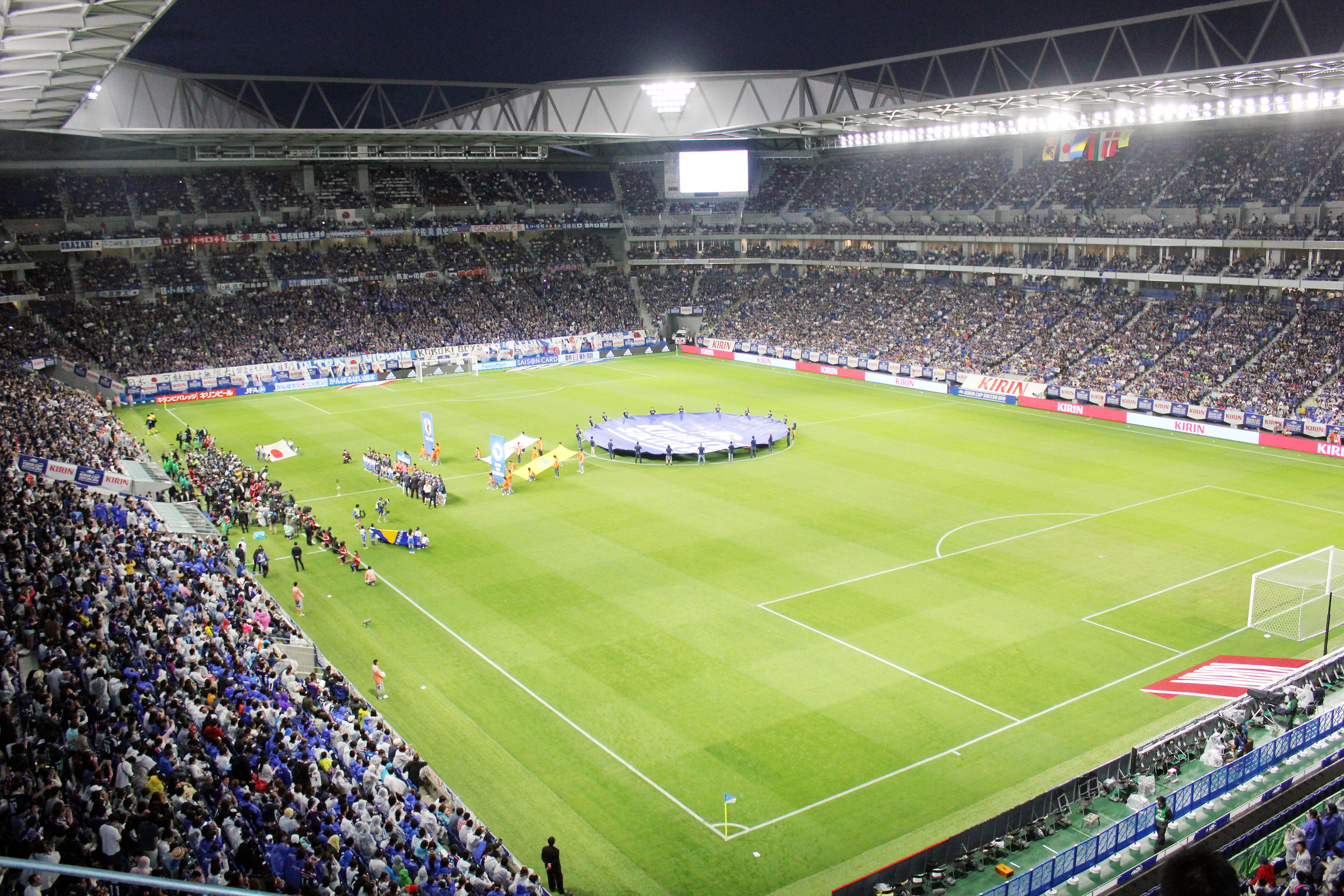
Panasonic Stadium Suita

The sports teams listed below are based in Osaka.

=== Association football ===
==== League ====
- Cerezo Osaka (J1 League)
- FC Osaka (J3 League)
- Gamba Osaka (J1 League)

=== Baseball ===
- Orix Buffaloes
- Hanshin Tigers

=== Basketball ===
- Osaka Evessa

=== Volleyball ===
- Osaka Blazers Sakai
- Suntory Sunbirds
- Panasonic Panthers

=== Rugby union ===
- Red Hurricanes Osaka
- Hanazono Liners

== The prefectural symbols ==
The symbol of Osaka Prefecture, called the sennari byōtan or "thousand gourds", was originally the crest of Toyotomi Hideyoshi, the feudal lord of Osaka Castle.

== See also ==
- List of twin towns and sister cities in Japan
- Osaka Culture Prize
- Osaka Eco Agricultural Products
- Osaka Metropolis plan
- Politics of Osaka
