= Nose, Osaka =

Nose 能勢町
- Town
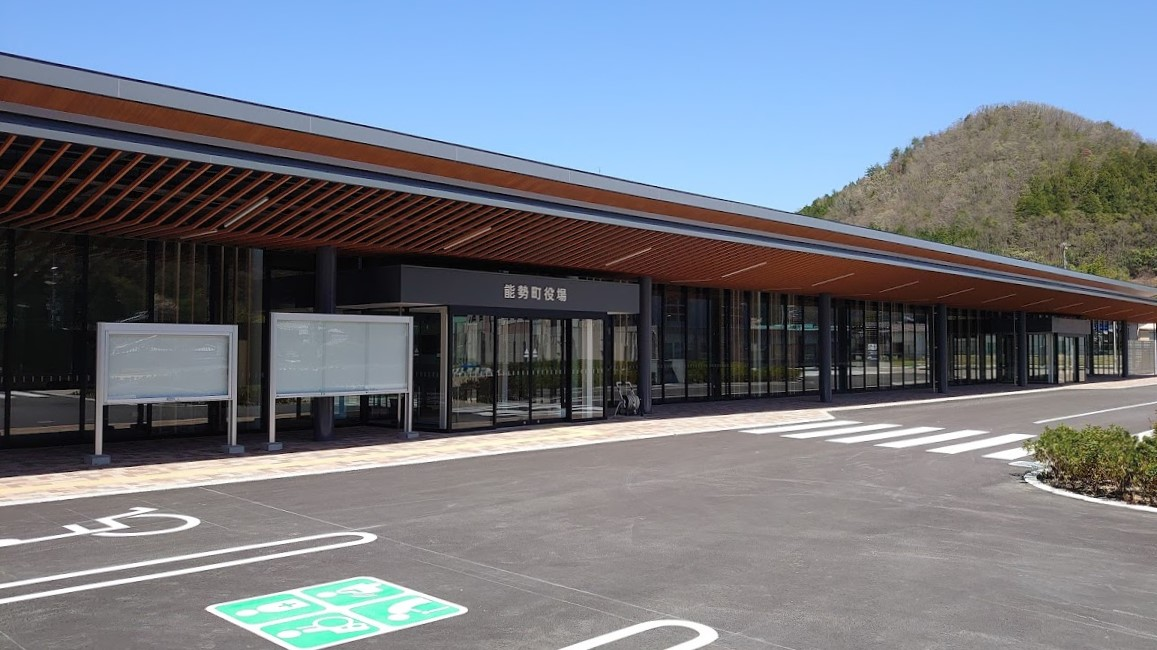
- Nose Town Hall

- Flag Emblem
- Location of Nose in Osaka Prefecture

- Location in Japan
- Coordinates: 34°58′21″N 135°24′51″E
- Country: Japan
- Region: Kansai; Kinki
- Prefecture: Osaka
- District: Toyono

Government
  - Mayor: Kazuhiro Naka

Area
  - Total: 98.75 km^{2} (38.13 sq mi)

Population (May 1, 2023)
  - Total: 9,185
  - Density: 93.01/km^{2} (240.9/sq mi)
- Time zone: UTC+09:00 (JST)
- City hall address: 28 Shukuno, Nose-chō, Toyono-gun, Osaka-fu 563-0392
- Climate: Cfa
- Website: Official website
- Symbols
- Flower: Lilium japonicum
- Tree: Zelkova serrata

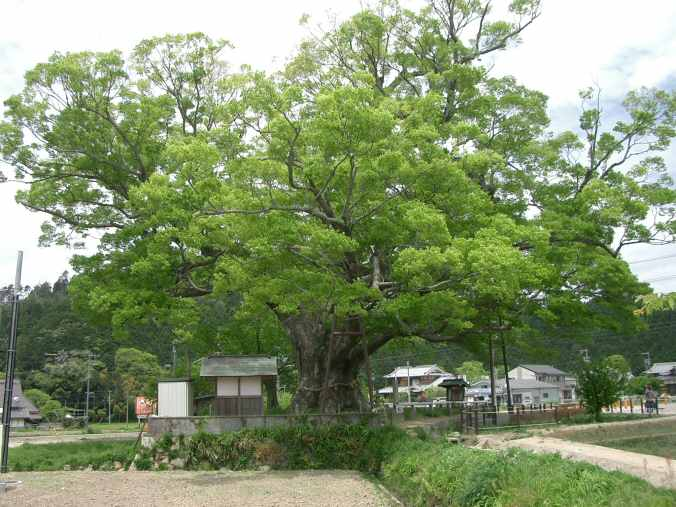
"Noma Keyaki" in Nose

Nose (能勢町, Nose-chō) (Japanese pronunciation: [nose]) is a town situated in Toyono District, Osaka Prefecture, Japan. As of 1 May 2023, the town had an estimated population of 9,185 in 4541 households and a population density of 93 persons per km^{2}. The total area of the town is 98.75 square kilometres (38.13 sq mi).

== Geography ==
Nose is located in the northernmost tip of Osaka Prefecture, surrounded by mountains, including Mount Miyama (791m) and Mount Kenpi (784m). Commercial facilities and administrative facilities are concentrated in the west area, but facilities are dispersed in small hamlets throughout the town. In addition to the Yamabe River, Ojitsugi River, Noma River, and Tajiri River in the Yodo River water system, the Hozu River flows through the town.

=== Adjoining municipalities ===
Hyōgo Prefecture

- Inagawa
- Kawanishi
- Tamba-Sasayama

Kyoto Prefecture

- Kameoka
- Nantan

Osaka Prefecture

- Toyono

=== Climate ===
Nose has a humid subtropical climate (Köppen Cfa) characterized by warm summers and cool winters with light to no snowfall. The average annual temperature in Nose is 13.8 °C (56.8 °F). The average annual rainfall is 1,483.1 mm (58.39 in) with July as the wettest month. The temperatures are highest on average in August, at around 25.9 °C (78.6 °F), and lowest in January, at around 2.4 °C (36.3 °F).

Climate data for Nose (1991−2020 normals, extremes 1977−present)
Month	Jan	Feb	Mar	Apr	May	Jun	Jul	Aug	Sep	Oct	Nov	Dec	Year
Record high °C (°F)	16.3 (61.3)	19.8 (67.6)	22.6 (72.7)	28.4 (83.1)	32.0 (89.6)	34.4 (93.9)	37.3 (99.1)	37.4 (99.3)	35.8 (96.4)	30.4 (86.7)	25.5 (77.9)	20.3 (68.5)	37.4 (99.3)
Mean daily maximum °C (°F)	7.4 (45.3)	8.3 (46.9)	12.2 (54.0)	18.1 (64.6)	22.9 (73.2)	25.8 (78.4)	29.4 (84.9)	31.2 (88.2)	27.2 (81.0)	21.5 (70.7)	15.7 (60.3)	10.0 (50.0)	19.1 (66.5)
Daily mean °C (°F)	2.4 (36.3)	3.1 (37.6)	6.5 (43.7)	12.0 (53.6)	17.1 (62.8)	21.0 (69.8)	24.8 (76.6)	25.9 (78.6)	22.0 (71.6)	16.0 (60.8)	9.9 (49.8)	4.6 (40.3)	13.8 (56.8)
Mean daily minimum °C (°F)	−1.9 (28.6)	−1.5 (29.3)	1.0 (33.8)	5.9 (42.6)	11.5 (52.7)	16.7 (62.1)	21.0 (69.8)	21.7 (71.1)	17.8 (64.0)	11.3 (52.3)	4.7 (40.5)	0.0 (32.0)	9.0 (48.2)
Record low °C (°F)	−8.2 (17.2)	−10.8 (12.6)	−6.9 (19.6)	−3.5 (25.7)	−0.2 (31.6)	6.1 (43.0)	12.3 (54.1)	13.1 (55.6)	6.7 (44.1)	−0.1 (31.8)	−3.7 (25.3)	−7.4 (18.7)	−10.8 (12.6)
Average precipitation mm (inches)	49.9 (1.96)	61.5 (2.42)	100.6 (3.96)	111.0 (4.37)	145.7 (5.74)	181.2 (7.13)	213.0 (8.39)	154.5 (6.08)	192.4 (7.57)	142.8 (5.62)	72.8 (2.87)	57.8 (2.28)	1,483.1 (58.39)
Average precipitation days (≥ 1.0 mm)	6.5	7.6	9.9	9.9	10.2	11.5	11.8	9.0	10.4	9.0	6.4	7.1	109.3
Mean monthly sunshine hours	113.4	113.0	147.6	179.2	189.9	132.5	152.2	195.7	150.0	153.8	134.5	122.6	1,784.5
Source: Japan Meteorological Agency

=== Demographics ===
Per Japanese census data, the population of Nose in 2020 is 9,079 people. Nose has been conducting censuses since 1920.

Historical population
Year	Pop.	±%
1920	9,796	—
1925	9,914	+1.2%
1930	10,011	+1.0%
1935	9,853	−1.6%
1940	10,034	+1.8%
1945	12,388	+23.5%
1950	12,057	−2.7%
1955	11,426	−5.2%
1960	10,467	−8.4%
1965	9,906	−5.4%
1970	9,521	−3.9%
1975	9,749	+2.4%
1980	10,024	+2.8%
1985	10,389	+3.6%
1990	10,850	+4.4%
1995	13,876	+27.9%
2000	14,186	+2.2%
2005	12,897	−9.1%
2010	11,659	−9.6%
2015	10,256	−12.0%
2020	9,079	−11.5%
Nose population statistics

== History ==
The area of Nose was part on ancient Settsu Province, and Nose District was separated from Kawabe District in 713 AD. Nose's ancient name is Kusaka Village. It is mentioned in the Nihon Shoki, completed in 720 CE. During the Edo period, it was largely tenryō territory under the direct control of the Tokugawa shogunate. In 1837, there was an important peasant revolt in Nose, in the context of the Tenpō famine (1833-1839), some months after Ōshio Heihachirō’s riot. Following the Meiji restoration, Nose District and Teshima District were merged to form Toyono District, Osaka and the area was divided into villages with the creation of the modern municipalities system on April 1, 1896. The town of Nose was established on September 30, 1956, by the merger of the villages of Utagaki (歌垣村), Tajiri (田尻村) and Nishinose (西能勢村). The village of Tōgō (東郷村) was annexed on May 3, 1959.

== Government ==
Nose has a mayor-council form of government with a directly elected mayor and a unicameral Nose council of 12 members. Nose, collectively with the town of Toyono and city of Minoh, contributes one member to the Osaka Prefectural Assembly. In terms of national politics, the town is part of the Osaka 9th district of the lower house of the Diet of Japan.

== Economy ==
The economy of Nose is largely agricultural. There is one sake brewery and soma scattered light manufacturing.

== Education ==
Situated in the south of Nose is the Nose Elementary & Junior High School. Furthermore, the Osaka Prefectural Board of Education operates a branch of the Toyonaka High School in Nose. The school is visited by about 70 students as of September 2023.

== Transportation ==
=== Railway ===
Nose has no passenger railway service. The nearest train station to the town hall is Yamashita Station on the Nose Electric Railway. The closest station to the Noma area is Myōkenguchi Station.

=== Bus service ===
Starting from Yamashita Station, three Buses run through a major part of east and central Nose. The most frequent of which ending in the Nosecho Shukuno bus station, close to the town hall.

=== Highways ===
- National Route 173
- National Route 477

== Local attractions ==
Nose is noted for the "Noma Keyaki", a 1,000-year-old Keyaki tree, 25 m tall (82 ft), 11.95 m (39.2 ft) trunk circumference.
