= Meiji no Mori Minō Quasi-National Park =

Quasi-national park in Osaka prefecture, Japan

Coordinates: 34.857632°N 135.478728°E

- 明治の森箕面国定公園
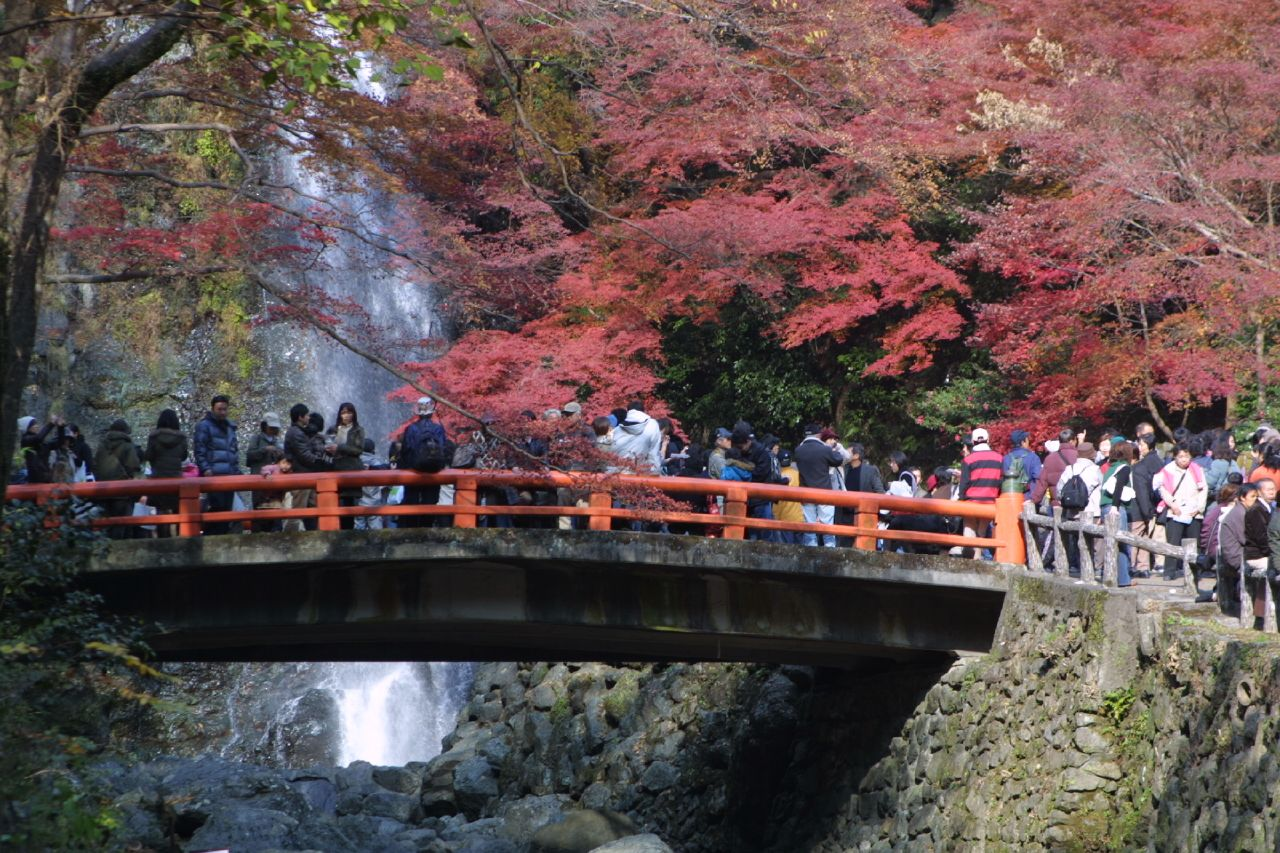
- Minō Falls
- Interactive map of Meiji no Mori Minō Quasi-National Park
- Location: Osaka, Japan
- Area: 9.63 km^{2} (3.72 sq mi)
- Established: December 11, 1967

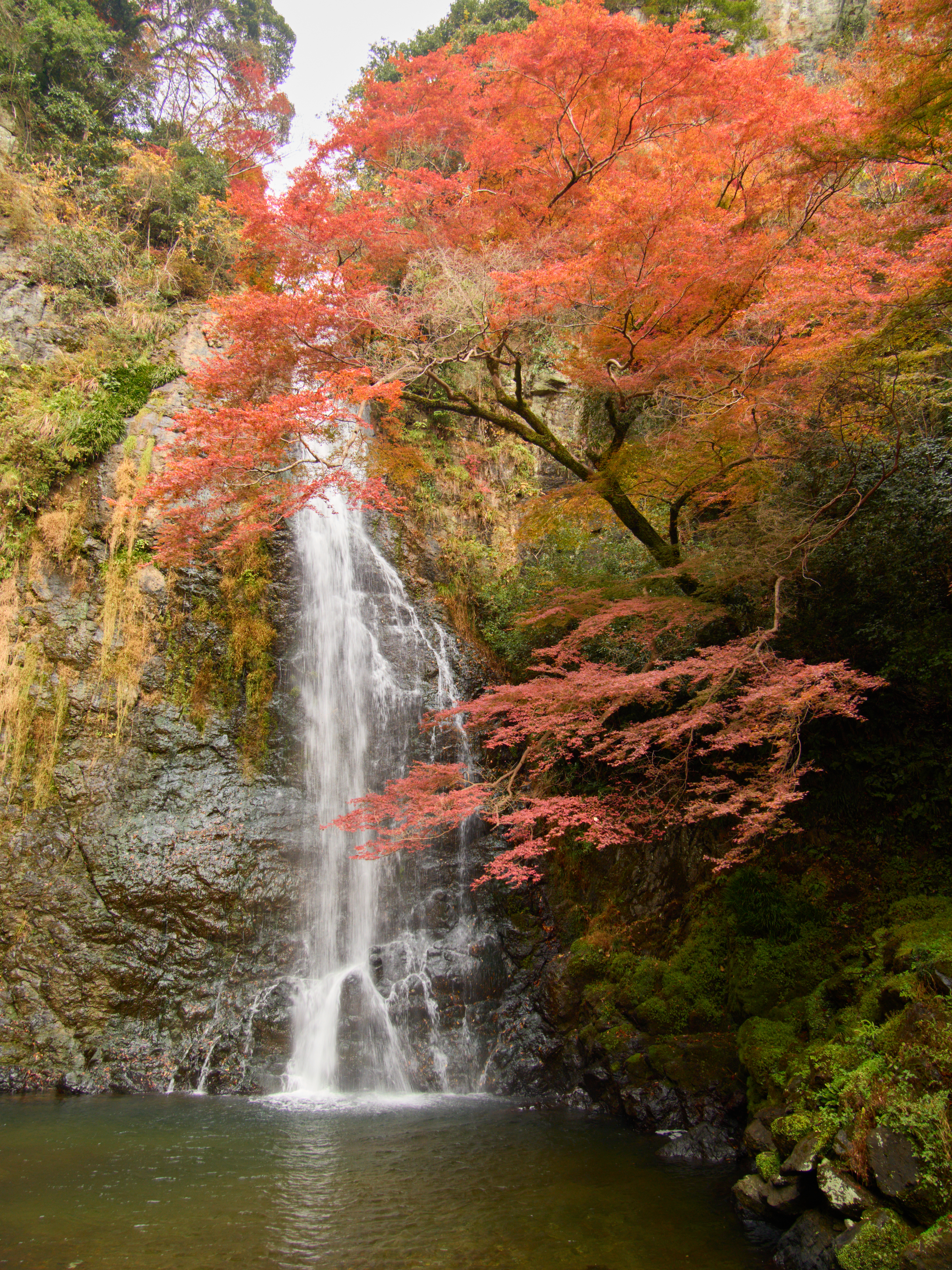
Minoh Falls, framed by Japanese maple trees in autumn foliage.

Meiji no Mori Minō Kokutei Kōen (明治の森箕面国定公園) is a Quasi-National Park in Osaka Prefecture, Japan. It was established on 11 December 1967 to commemorate the centennial celebrations of the accession of Emperor Meiji. With an area of just 9.6 km^{2}, it is one of the smallest of Japan's national parks.

== Overview ==
The park is located on Mt Minō in Ōsaka Prefecture. Its grounds encompass 963 ha of lower mountain slope and forest and reside at relatively low altitudes of 100 m to 600m. The park's main attraction is the eponymous Minō Falls, a waterfall that was named because it is said to look like a farmer winnowing grain with a winnowing basket, called a mi (箕) in Japanese.

Geologically, sedimentary rocks from the Mesozoic Era dominate the geology of the location with occasional outcroppings of granite and diorite. The tomb of Kaijyo, the founding monk of Katsuō-ji Temple built in 765, is located inside of the park.

Despite its proximity to the Metropolitan Osaka Area, the park is inhabited by 1,300 plant species and 3,500 insect species. The location is also known as a paradise for a large population of birds, animals, fish, and little creatures, as well as monkeys, which are protected by law. The Tōkai Nature Trail, which starts at Meiji no Mori Takao Quasi-National Park, ends here.

== Access ==
The park is located north of Hankyu Minoo Line's Minoo Station.

== See also ==
- List of national parks of Japan
- Meiji no Mori Takao Quasi-National Park
- Emperor Meiji
- The 100 Views of Nature in Kansai
