= Sakurai Station =

Sakurai Station (桜井駅) is the name of multiple train stations in Japan:

- Sakurai Station (Aichi)
- Sakurai Station (Nara)
- Sakurai Station (Osaka)
- Iyo-Sakurai Station, Ehime
