= Ikeda Station (Osaka) =

Railway station in Ikeda, Osaka Prefecture, Japan

Coordinates: 34°49′18″N 135°25′32″E

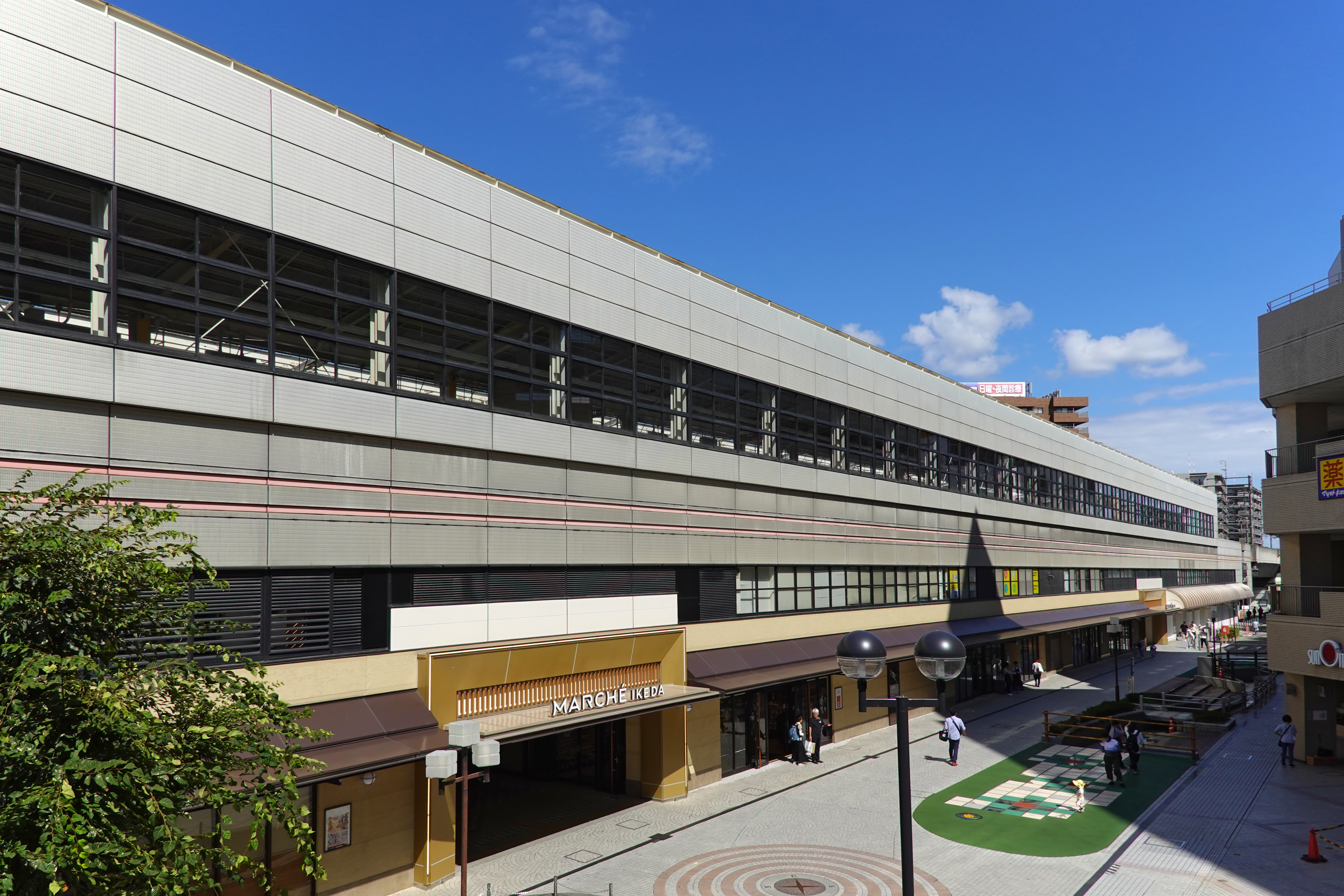
North view of the station

Ikeda Station (池田駅, Ikeda eki, station number: HK-49) is a train station located in Ikeda, Osaka. It is the last station in the Osaka Prefecture when coming from Osaka Umeda Station. The station is one of the oldest in the Hankyu Railway, being opened on March 10, 1910. The station building also serves as the registered office of both Hankyu and Hankyu Hanshin Holdings.

== Layout ==
There are two platforms, with a Pocket track on the South side of the station. The concourse of the Train Station is on the second floor, while the platform itself is located on the third.

1	■ Takarazuka Line	for Takarazuka
2	■ Takarazuka Line	for Umeda

== Lines ==
- Hankyu Takarazuka Line

== Surrounding area ==
- Itsuo Art Museum
- Cup Noodles Museum

== Adjacent stations ==
Preceding station	Hankyu Railway	Following station
Ishibashi handai-mae HK-48 towards Osaka-umeda	Takarazuka Main Line Local Express	Kawanishi-Noseguchi HK-50 towards Takarazuka
Ishibashi handai-mae HK-48 towards Osaka-umeda	Takarazuka Main Line Semi-Express Commuter Limited Express	Kawanishi-Noseguchi HK-50 One-way operation
Ishibashi handai-mae HK-48 towards Osaka-umeda	Nissei Express	Kawanishi-Noseguchi HK-50 towards Nissei-chuo

== See also ==
- List of railway stations in Japan
