= Makiochi Station =

Railway station in Minoh, Osaka Prefecture, Japan

Makiochi Station 牧落駅
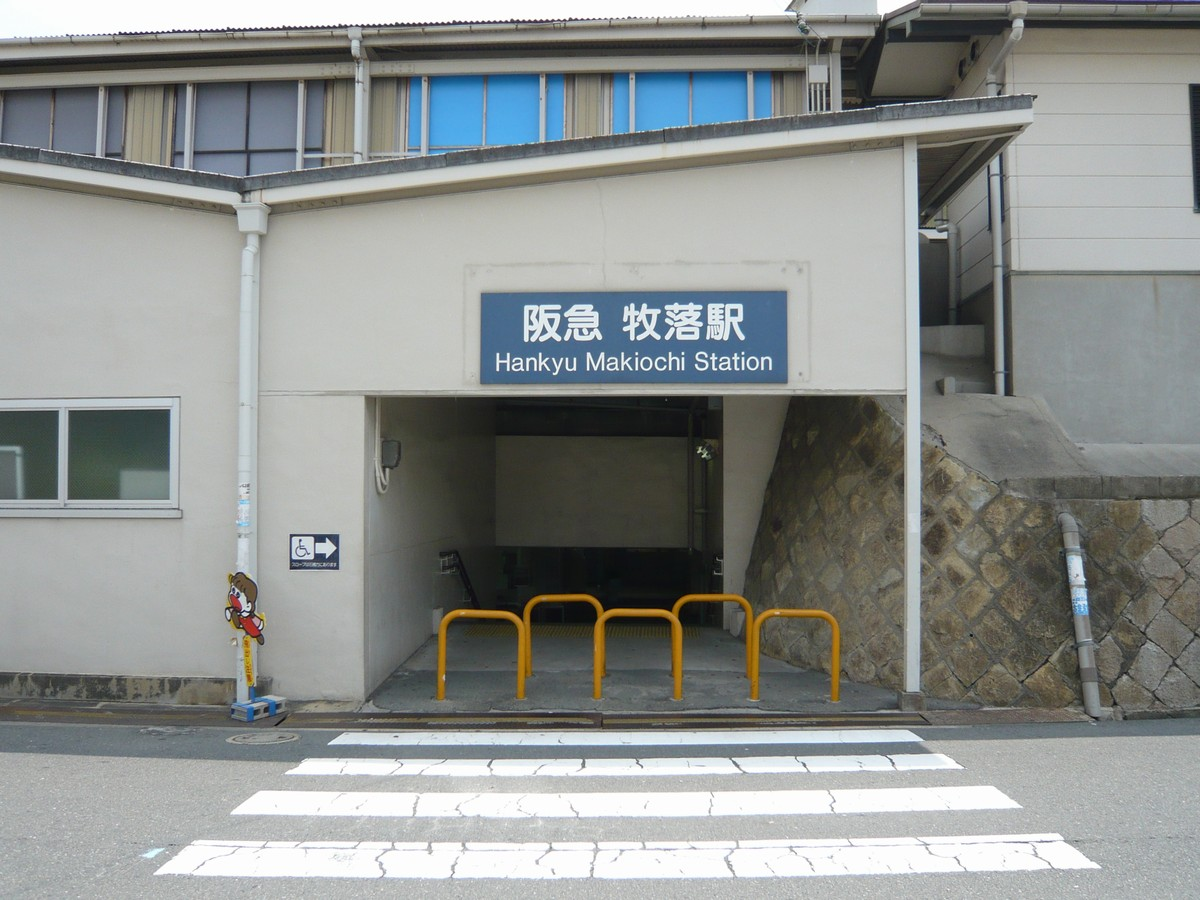
- Makiochi Station

General information
- Location: 4-chōme-1 Sakura, Minoh-shi, Osaka-fu 562-0041
- Coordinates: 34°49′24.38″N 135°27′57.06″E
- Operator: Hankyu Railway
- Line: Minoo Line
- Distance: 2.7 km (1.7 miles) from Ishibashi handai-mae.
- Platforms: 2 side platforms
- Tracks: 2

Construction
- Accessible: yes

Other information
- Status: Staffed
- Station code: HK-58
- Website: Official website

History
- Opened: 20 December 1921

Passengers
- FY2023: 6,497 daily

Services
Preceding station	Hankyu Railway	Following station
Sakurai HK-57 towards Ishibashi handai-mae	Minoo Line Local Semi-Express	Minoo HK-59 Terminus
Location
- Location within Osaka Prefecture Location within Japan

Makiochi Station (牧落駅, Makiochi-eki; station number: HK-58) is a passenger railway station located in the city of Minoh, Osaka Prefecture, Japan. It is operated by the private transportation company Hankyu Railway.

== Lines ==
Makiochi Station is served by the Hankyu Minoo Line, and is located 2.7 kilometers from the terminus of the line at Ishibashi handai-mae.

== Layout ==
The station consists of two opposed side platforms connected by an underground passage.

=== Platforms ===
1	■ Minoo Line	for Minoo
2	■ Minoo Line	for Ishibashi handai-mae, Osaka-umeda, and Takarazuka

== History ==
Makiochi Station opened on 30 December 1921.

Station numbering was introduced to all Hankyu stations on 21 December 2013 with this station being designated as station number HK-58.

== Passenger statistics ==
In 2023, the station was used by an average of 6,497 passengers daily. (Note: Data published by the Ministry of Land, Infrastructure, Transport and Tourism state the number of passengers boarding and disembarking by station in a given year. FY2023 covers the period from 1 April 2023 to 31 March 2024. Data published by individual railways directly may state the number boarding only.)

== Surrounding area ==
- Osaka Prefectural Minoh High School
- Minoh City Minoh Elementary School
- Minoh City Hall

== See also ==
- List of railway stations in Japan
