= Ikeda, Osaka =

Ikeda 池田市
- City
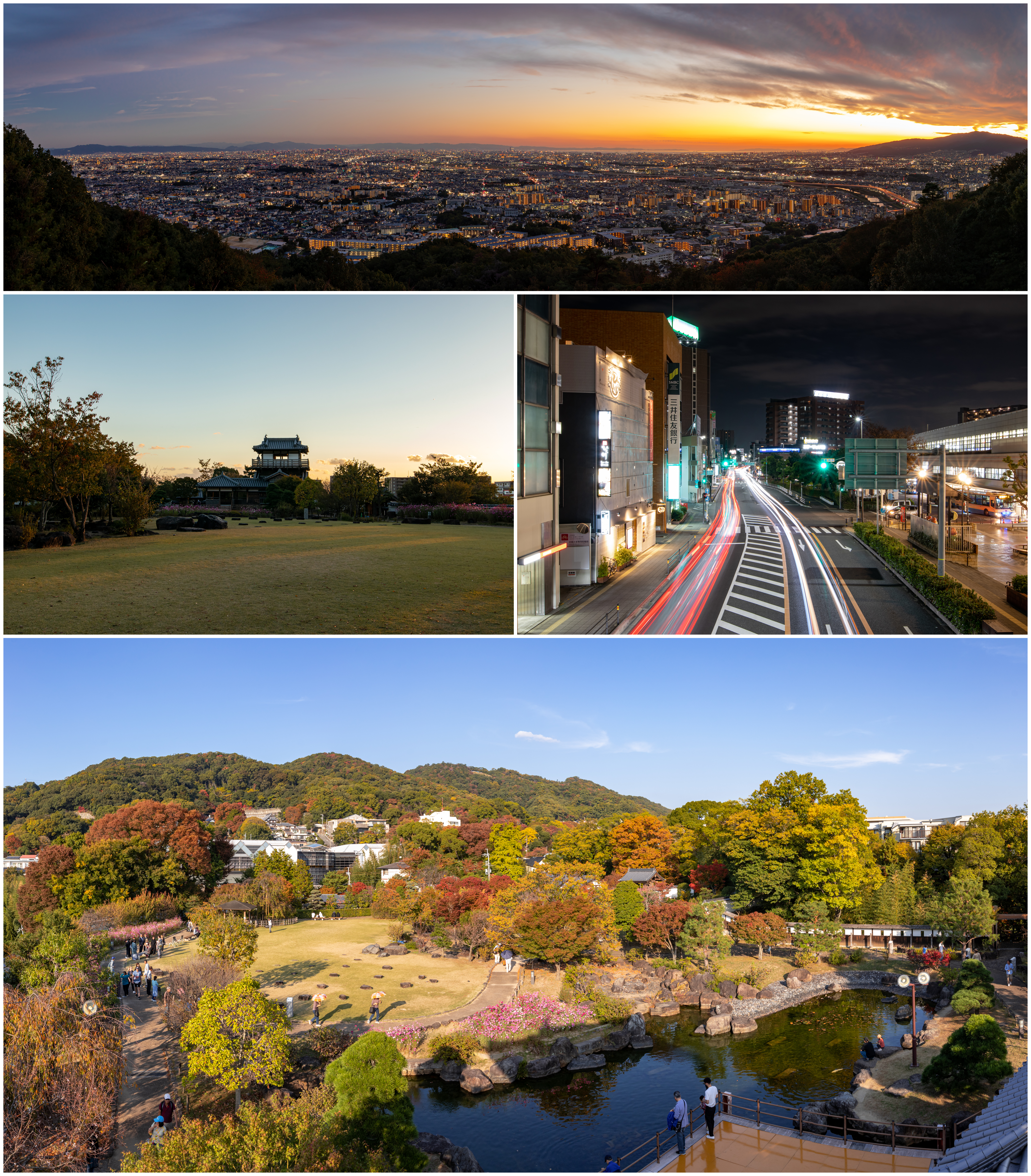

- Flag Emblem
- Interactive map of Ikeda
- Location in Japan
- Coordinates: 34°49′18″N 135°25′43″E
- Country: Japan
- Region: Kansai
- Prefecture: Osaka

Government
  - Mayor: Tomoko Takizawa (from August 2021)

Area
  - Total: 22.14 km^{2} (8.55 sq mi)

Population (March 31, 2023)
  - Total: 103,064
  - Density: 4,655/km^{2} (12,060/sq mi)
- Time zone: UTC+09:00 (JST)
- City hall address: 1-1-1, Jōnan, Ikeda-shi, Ōsaka-fu 563-8666
- Website: Official website
- Symbols
- Bird: Oriental turtle dove
- Flower: Satsuki azalea
- Tree: Camphor laurel

Ikeda (池田市, Ikeda-shi; Japanese pronunciation: [ì.ké̞.dä́(.ɕì)]) is a city in Osaka Prefecture, Japan. As of 31 March 2023, the city had an estimated population of 103,064 in 49723 households and a population density of 4700 persons per km^{2}. The total area of the city is 22.14 square kilometres (8.55 sq mi). It is a suburban city of Osaka City and a part of the Kyoto-Osaka-Kobe metropolitan area.

== Geography ==
Ikeda is located in the northern part of the Osaka Plain in the northwestern part of Osaka Prefecture. The city area is elongated from north to south, with Satsukiyama in the Hokusetsu mountains in the north and a small basin along the Kuanji River, and an alluvial fan and the Inagawa plain in the south. A quiet residential area spreads out in the southern part of the city, and the townscape has been influenced by residential land development by Minoh Arima Electric Tramway (currently Hankyu Electric Railway).

=== Neighboring municipalities ===
Hyōgo Prefecture

- Itami
- Kawanishi

Osaka Prefecture

- Minoh
- Toyonaka
- Toyono

== Climate ==
Ikeda has a humid subtropical climate (Köppen Cfa) characterized by warm summers and cool winters with light to no snowfall. The average annual temperature in Ikeda is 15.0 °C. The average annual rainfall is 1475 mm with September as the wettest month. The temperatures are highest on average in August, at around 26.9 °C, and lowest in January, at around 3.7 °C.

== Demographics ==
Per Japanese census data, the population of Ikeda has remained relatively steady over the past 40 years.

Historical population
| Year | Pop. | ±% |
|---|---|---|
| 1940 | 35,494 | — |
| 1950 | 45,177 | +27.3% |
| 1960 | 59,688 | +32.1% |
| 1970 | 94,333 | +58.0% |
| 1980 | 101,121 | +7.2% |
| 1990 | 104,218 | +3.1% |
| 2000 | 101,516 | −2.6% |
| 2010 | 104,171 | +2.6% |

== History ==
The area of Ikeda was part of ancient Settsu Province. It was known as "Kureha no Sato" since ancient times, and even today, vestiges can be seen in the place names and names of shrines and temple with ancient foundations in the site. In the latter half of the Heian period, a shōen landed estate called Kurehanoshō was established, and it came to be called "Ikeda" around the end of the Kamakura period. Ikeda Castle, the residence of the Settsu Ikeda clan, was built during the Nanboku-chō period, but was abandoned during the Sengoku period when Araki Murashige defeated the Ikeda clan in 1574, and moved the castle to Itami. During the Edo Period, the area was largely part of the holdings of Asada Domain, and was famous for Ikeda-zumi (Ikeda charcoal) traded by Ikeda merchants. In cha no yu Ikeda-zumi is loved because of its high quality even today.

The village of Ikeda was established with the creation of the modern municipality system on April 1, 1889. It was raised to town status on August 10, 1935. The town was developed as a commuter town by the Hankyu Railway, whose founder Kobayashi Ichizo (Itsuo) was a resident and major landowner. Ikeda was raised to city status on April 29, 1939.

On June 8, 2001, the Ikeda school massacre occurred in this city. A man entered an elementary school and fatally stabbed eight children in the school. Many pupils have suffered post-traumatic stress disorder. To avoid flashback memories of the massacre and to improve school security, the buildings were remodeled and subsequently occupied in April 2004. On September 14, 2004, Mamoru Takuma was executed for the murders.

== Government ==
Ikeda has a mayor-council form of government with a directly elected mayor and a unicameral city council of 22 members. Ikeda contributes one member to the Osaka Prefectural Assembly. In terms of national politics, the city is part of Osaka 9th district of the lower house of the Diet of Japan.

== Economy ==
The southwestern part of the city is home to the headquarters and factories of Daihatsu and Toyosu, the Ikeda office of Ricoh, and the Osaka Airport Factory of Daiichiya Baking. In addition, Goshun Sake Brewery, which inherited the tradition of Ikeda Sake, which was as famous as "Itami Sake" in the middle of the Edo period, is still in existence. Many Hankyu affiliated companies, including Hankyu Hanshin Holdings, have their headquarters and head offices here. There are also two regional wholesale markets, the Maruike Regional Wholesale Market and the Marukita Regional Wholesale Market, located near Osaka International Airport. The Hosokawa district of northern Ikeda is one of Japan's four major producers of garden trees, with a history of more than 400 years.

=== Major company headquarters ===
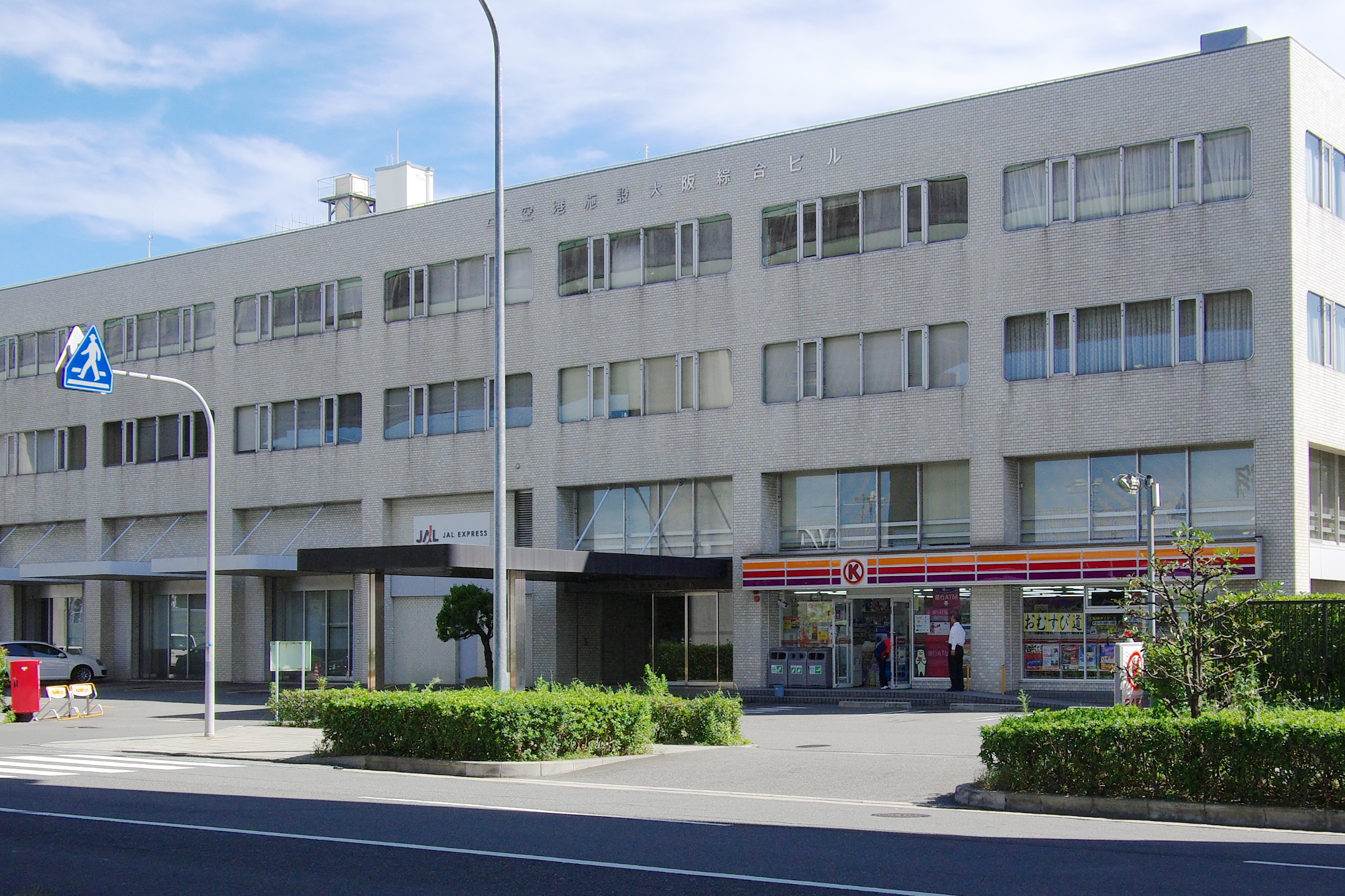
JAL Express headquarters in Ikeda

- Daihatsu has maintained a factory since the late 1930s and the main office was established during the 1960s.
- Ikeda Bank
- Toyosu Co Ltd, produces and sells rice confectionery and related products.
- JAL Express has its headquarters on the grounds of Osaka International Airport and in Ikeda.
- Ricoh
- Goshun Sake Brewery which produces Itami sake
- Ikeda mandarin oranges have been grown in the region since the Meiji Era

== Education ==
Ikeda has nine public elementary schools, five public middle schools and one combined elementary/middle school operated by the city government and three public high schools operated by the Osaka Prefectural Department of Education. There are also one elementary, one middle and one high school operated by the national government. There is also one private high school.

== Transportation ==
=== Railway ===
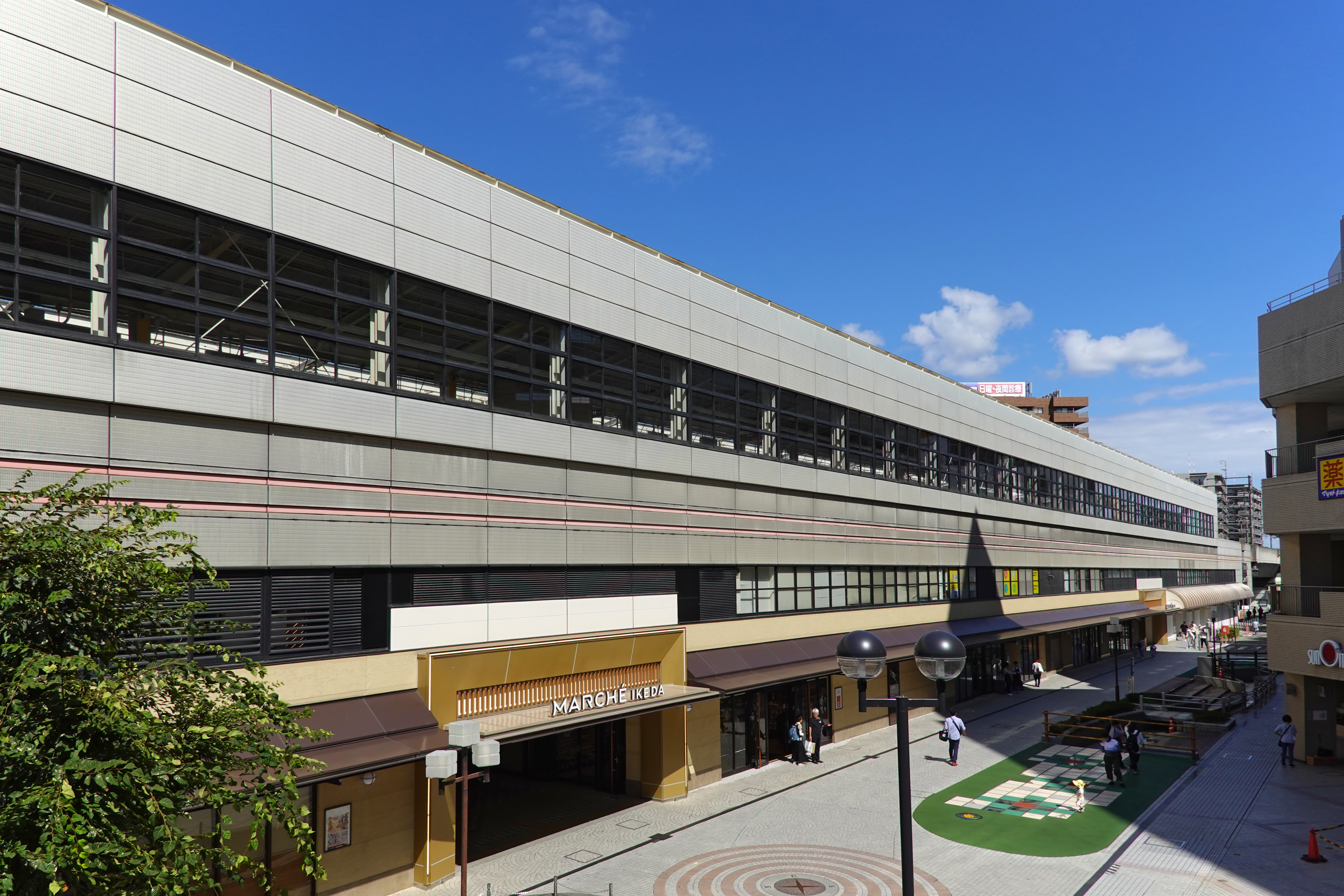
Ikeda Station

Hankyu Railway Hankyu Takarazuka Line

- Ikeda - Ishibashi handai-mae

Hankyu Railway Hankyu Minoo Line

- Ishibashi handai-mae

=== Highway ===
- Chūgoku Expressway Chūgoku-Ikeda Interchange
- Hanshin Expressway Route 11 Ikeda Route
- National Route 171
- National Route 173
- National Route 176
- National Route 423
- National Route 477

== Sister cities ==
Ikeda is twinned with:

- Launceston, Australia, since 1965
- Suzhou, China, since 1981

== Local attractions ==
Ikeda boasts several cultural attractions: the Itsuō Art Museum holds the Itsuo Collection which is mainly Japanese art for cha-no-yu; Ikeda Bunko holds collections on the Takarazuka theater and other materials related to Hankyu Dentetsu. There is a municipal zoo named Satsukiyama Zoo. It is home to the Momofuku Ando Instant Ramen Museum Osaka Ikeda.

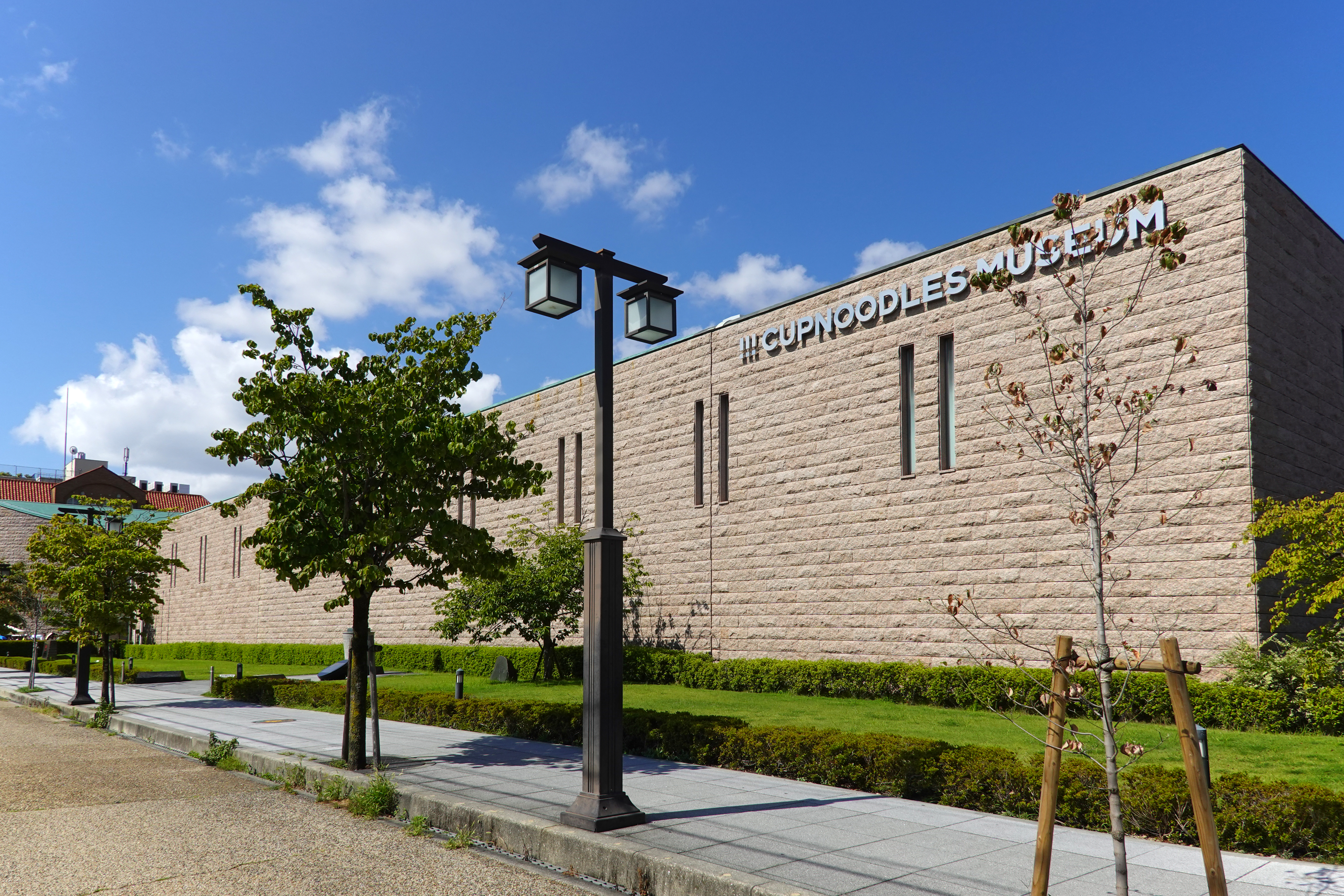
Ikeda Instant Noodle Museum

== Notable people from Ikeda ==
- Ichirō Nagai, former voice actor
- Tomoki Hasegawa, Japanese composer and arranger of music (anime soundtracks)
- Chiyo Okumura, Japanese pop singer
- Yūko Tanaka, actress
- Kamon Iizumi, governor
- Hirai Kawato, Japanese professional wrestler, currently signed to New Japan Pro-Wrestling (NJPW)
- Kensuke Tanabe, Japanese video game designer, producer and director (Nintendo, Senior Officer at Nintendo EPD)
- Asahisato Kenji, former sumo wrestler
- Daidō Moriyama, Japanese photographer
- Shigeo Okumura, Japanese professional wrestler, currently based in Mexico (Mexico City, Mexico)
- Yuko Nakanishi, Japanese Butterfly swimmer
- Ineko Arima, Japanese film actress
- Koki Ando, President and CEO of Nissin Foods and son of Momofuku Ando (the founder of Nissin Food Products Co., Ltd., the inventor of instant noodles and the creator of the brands Top Ramen and Cup Noodles)
- Ayumi Ishida, singer and actress (born in Sasebo, Nagasaki and raised in Ikeda, Osaka)
- Tamiki Wakaki, Japanese mangaka (The World God Only Knows)
- Atsuko Seta, Japanese classical pianist
- Kazue Akita, Japanese singer and former member of J-pop girlgroup SDN48
- Masayuki Naoshima, Japanese politician of the Democratic Party of Japan and member of the House of Councillors in the Diet (national legislature)
- Yoshiomi Tamai, Japanese activist, philanthropist, and educator (founder of Ashinaga)
- Yoshikuni Araki, Japanese garden architect
