= Minoh =

Minoh 箕面市
- City
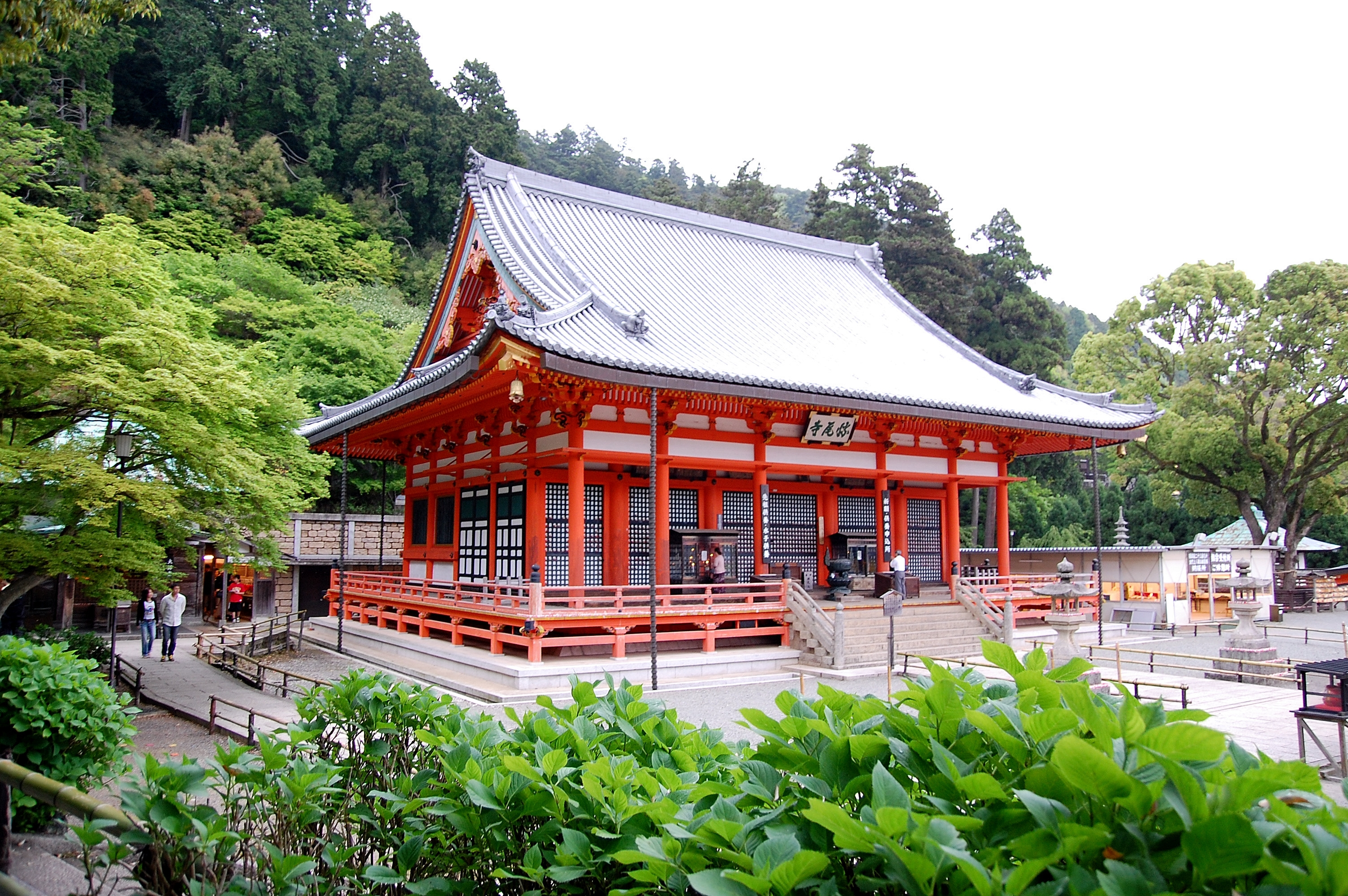
- View of Katsuo Temple in Minoh

- Flag Emblem
- Interactive map of Minoh
- Location in Japan
- Coordinates: 34°49′37″N 135°28′14″E
- Country: Japan
- Region: Kansai
- Prefecture: Osaka

Government
  - Mayor: Ryō Harada (from August 2024)

Area
  - Total: 47.90 km^{2} (18.49 sq mi)

Population (31 January 2023)
  - Total: 139,118
  - Density: 2,904/km^{2} (7,522/sq mi)
- Time zone: UTC+09:00 (JST)
- City hall address: 4-6-1 Nishishōji, Minoo-shi, Ōsaka-fu 562-0003
- Website: Official website
- Symbols
- Flower: Sasayuri (Lilium japonicum)
- Tree: Japanese maple

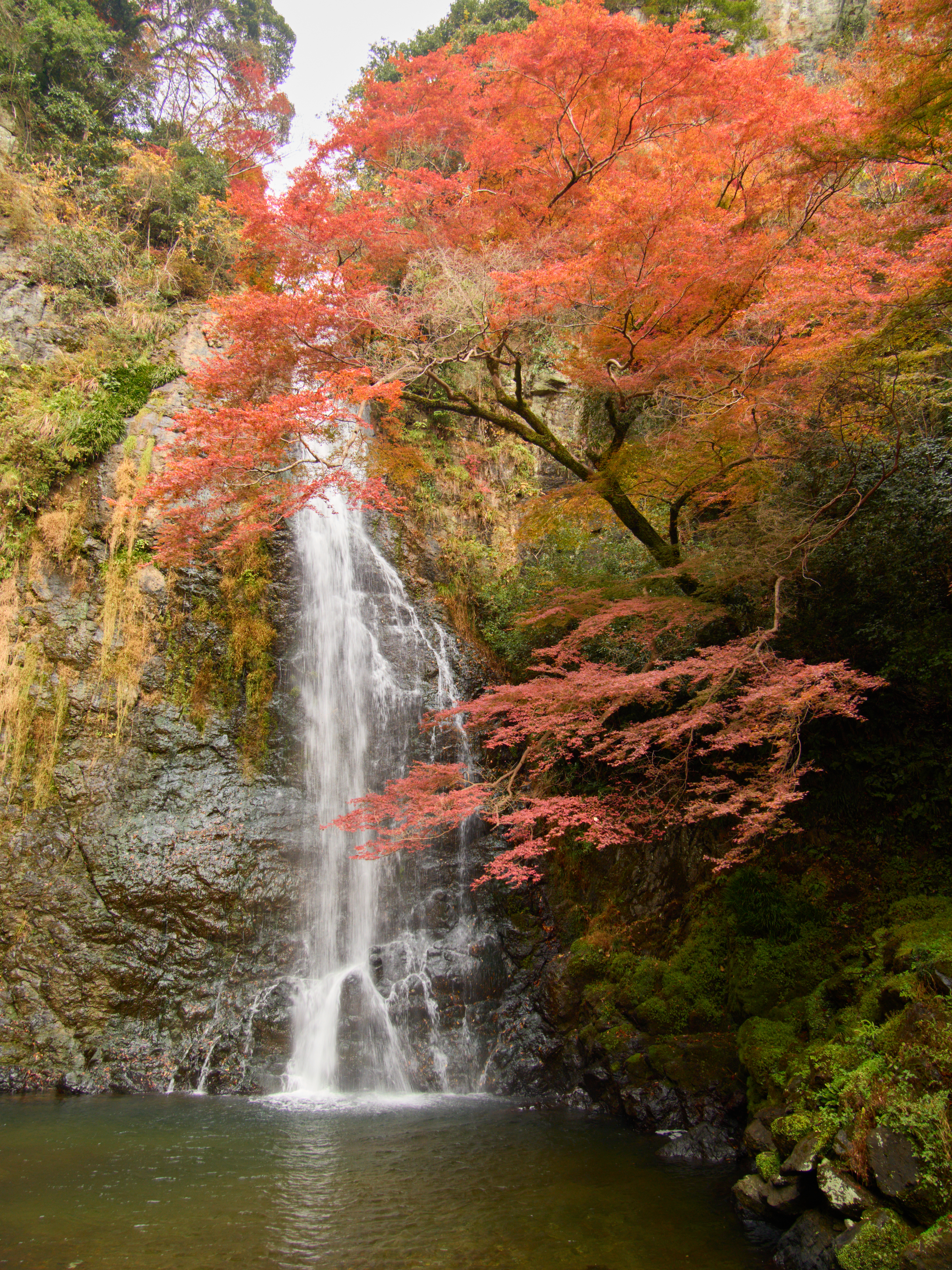
Minoh Falls, framed by Japanese maple trees in autumn foliage.

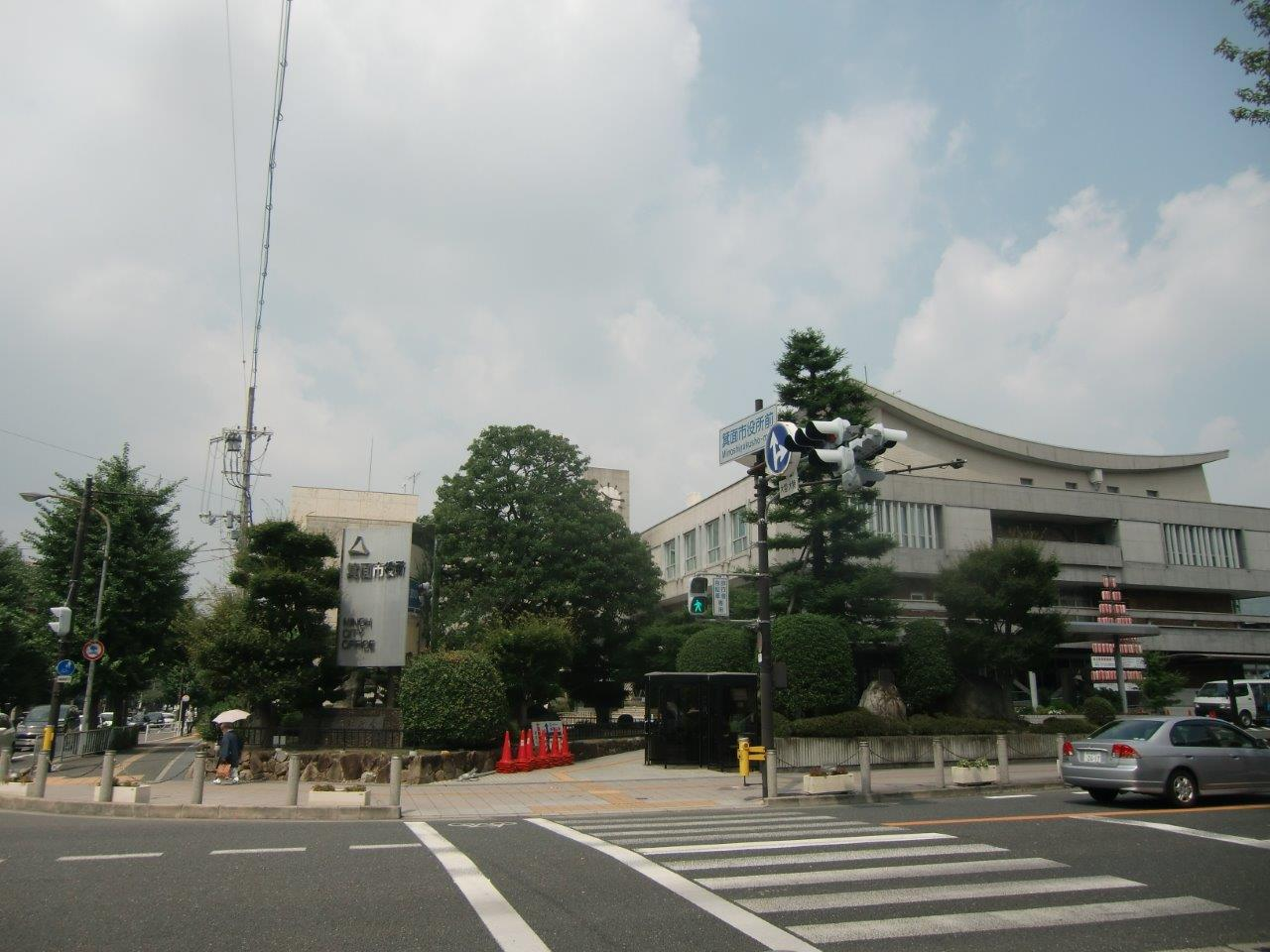
Minoh City Hall

Minoh (箕面市, Minō-shi) is a city in northwestern Osaka Prefecture, Japan. As of 31 January 2023, the city had an estimated population of 139,118 in 62,451 households and a population density of 2900 persons per km^{2}. The total area of the city is 47.90 square kilometres (18.49 sq mi). It is a suburban city of Osaka City and a part of the Kyoto-Osaka-Kobe metropolitan area. Its name is commonly romanized as "Minō" or "Minoo"; however, the city government officially uses the transliteration "Minoh" in romaji.

== Geography ==
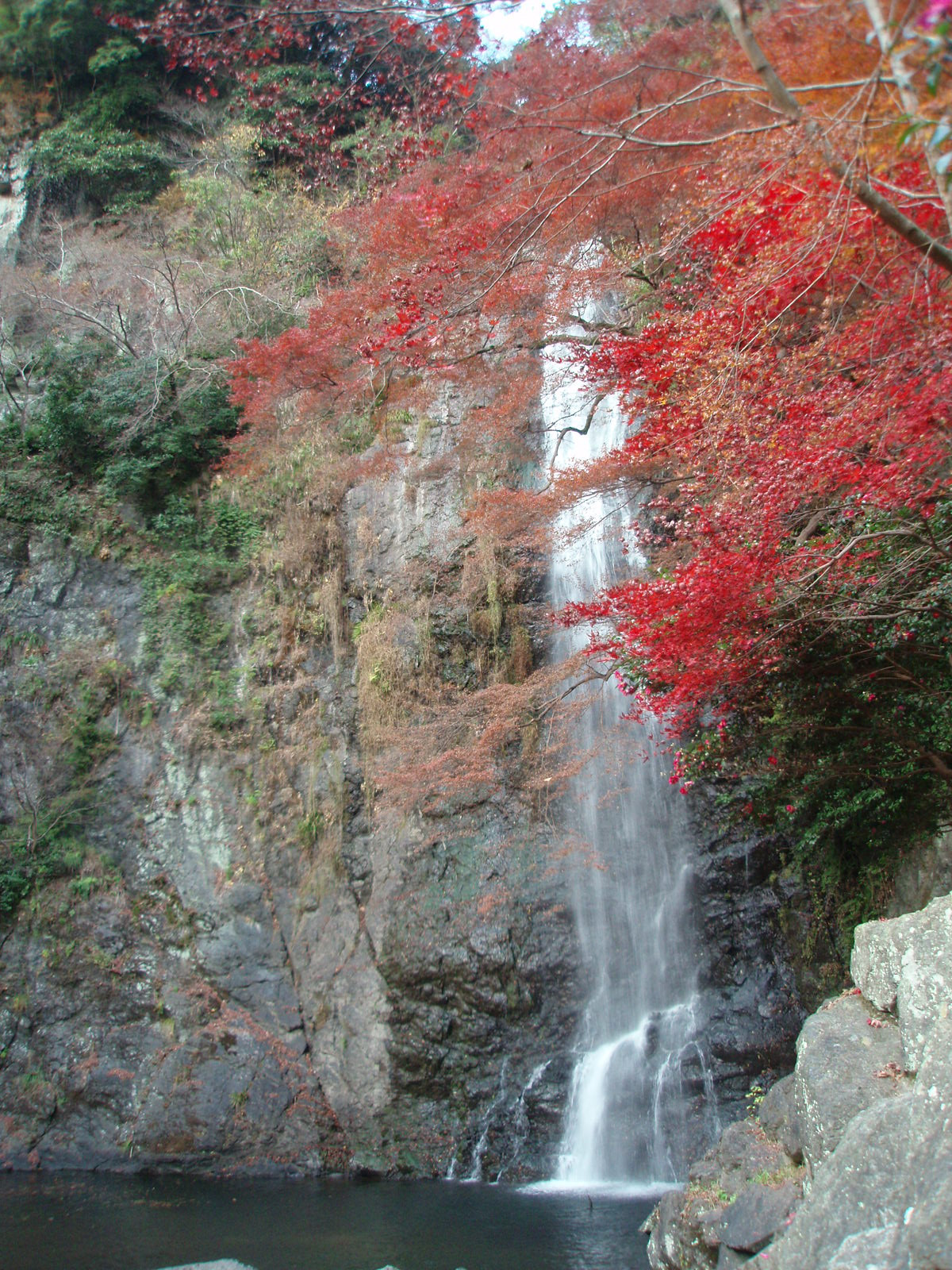
Minō waterfall

Minoh lies about 15 kilometers (9.3 mi) north of the center of the city of Osaka. It is accessed by the Hankyu Railway in about 30 minutes from Umeda Station. Most of the city's population is located in the southern part of the city, which is dominated by high-end residential areas. It has developed as a commuter town for the Osaka metropolitan area. The southwestern part of the city is an old urban and residential area, and the southeastern part of the city is a new residential area. The central and northern areas are mountainous. The Minoh River flows southwestward in the southwest, and the Hankyu Minoh Line runs parallel to it. The Senri River flows westward through the central and southern areas, and the Katsuoji River flows eastward through the southeastern areas.

=== Neighboring municipalities ===
Hyōgo Prefecture

- Kawanishi

Osaka Prefecture

- Ibaraki
- Ikeda
- Suita
- Toyonaka
- Toyono

== Climate ==
Minoh has a humid subtropical climate (Köppen Cfa) characterized by warm summers and cool winters with light to no snowfall. The average annual temperature in Minoh is 14.0 °C. The average annual rainfall is 1475 mm with September as the wettest month. The temperatures are highest on average in August, at around 25.9 °C, and lowest in January, at around 2.6 °C.

== Demographics ==
Per Japanese census data, the population of Minoh has remained relatively steady over the past 40 years.

Historical population
Year	Pop.	±%
1960	34,249	—
1970	57,414	+67.6%
1980	104,112	+81.3%
1990	122,120	+17.3%
2000	124,898	+2.3%
2010	129,777	+3.9%

== History ==
The area of the modern city of Minoh was within ancient Settsu Province. The village of Minoh was established with the creation of the modern municipalities system on 1 April 1889. It was raised to town status on 1 January 1948. Minoh merged with the village of Toyokawa and was raised to city status on 1 December 1956.

== Government ==
Minoh has a mayor-council form of government with a directly elected mayor and a unicameral city council of 23 members. Minoh, together with Toyono District, contributes two members to the Osaka Prefectural Assembly. In terms of national politics, the city is part of Osaka 9th district of the lower house of the Diet of Japan.

== Economy ==
Minoh is a regional commercial center and is also a commuter town due to its proximity to Osaka.

== Education ==
Minoh has 12 public elementary schools and six public middle schools operated by the city government and two public high schools operated by the Osaka Prefectural Department of Education. There are also one private combined elementary/middle/high school and one private combined middle/high school. The prefecture also operates one special education school for the handicapped. The Osaka Aoyama College is located in Minoh.

== Transportation ==
=== Railway ===
Kita-Osaka Kyuko Railway

- Minō-Kayano - Minō-Semba-Handaimae

Hankyu Railway Hankyu Minoo Line

- Sakurai - Makiochi - Minoo

=== Highway ===
- Shin-Meishin Expressway Mino-Todoromi Interchange
- Minō Toll Road
- National Route 171
- National Route 423

== Sister cities ==
Minoh is twinned with:

- Cuernavaca, Mexico
- Lower Hutt, New Zealand

== Local attractions ==
Minoh is best known for Meiji no Mori Minō Quasi-National Park, one of Japan's oldest national parks, which is home to a large population of wild monkeys and has a picturesque waterfall.

The 1200-year-old Buddhist temple Katsuō-ji, famous for its huge collection of Daruma dolls is located in Minoh.

Minoh Onsen, next to Hankyu train station, is a popular spot for locals. It is one of the few natural hot springs in Osaka Prefecture. Minoh Onsen also has a hotel that is popular with overseas tourists.

== Notable people ==
- Shōta Chida, Japanese professional shogi player, ranked 7-dan
- Dream Ami, Japanese singer, dancer, model, television personality and J-pop idol (Dream and E-girls; Real Name: Ami Nakashima, Nihongo: 中島 麻未, Nakashima Ami)
- Don Fujii, Japanese professional wrestler (Real Name: Tatsuki Fuji, Nihongo: 藤井 達樹, Fujii Tatsuki)
- Kazuki Hiramine, Japanese racing driver, co-winner of the 2022 Super GT GT500 class.
- Haruka Hirota, Japanese Olympic trampoline gymnast
- Sakiho Juri, Japanese performing artist and former member of the Takarazuka Revue
- Jyongri, Zainichi Korean pop singer (Real Name: Cho Jyong-ri, Hangul: 조종리)
- Masashi Kamekawa, Japanese football player (V-Varen Nagasaki, J2 League)
- Kenji Kasahara, Japanese entrepreneur and the founder of mixi
- Takuya Kimura, Japanese actor, singer, and radio personality (SMAP; Born in Tokyo, Japan, but raised in Minoh until entrance to elementary school in Chiba)
- Yūki Mizuhara, Japanese actress
- Ryōichi Sasakawa, Japanese businessman, politician, and philanthropist
- Takumi Shimohira, Japanese football player (JEF United Chiba, J2 League)
- Masaki Suda, Japanese actor and singer (Kamen Rider W; Real Name: Taishō Sugō, Nihongo: 菅生 大将, Sugō Taishō)
- Anju Suzuki, Japanese actress, television presenter, and former singer (Real Name: Kakuko Yamagata, Nihongo: 山形 香公子, Yamagata Kakuko)
- Ken Tajiri, Japanese football player (Gainare Tottori, J3 League)
- Teruzakura Hiroyuki, former sumo wrestler (Real Name: Hiroyuki Ozaki, Nihongo: 尾崎弘之, Ozaki Hiroyuki)
- Yuka Uda, Japanese road cyclist
- Yui Watanabe, Japanese voice actress and singer
- Yutaka Yamamoto, Japanese anime director and co-founder of Ordet
