= Sakurai Station (Osaka) =

Railway station in Minoh, Osaka Prefecture, Japan

Sakurai Station 桜井駅
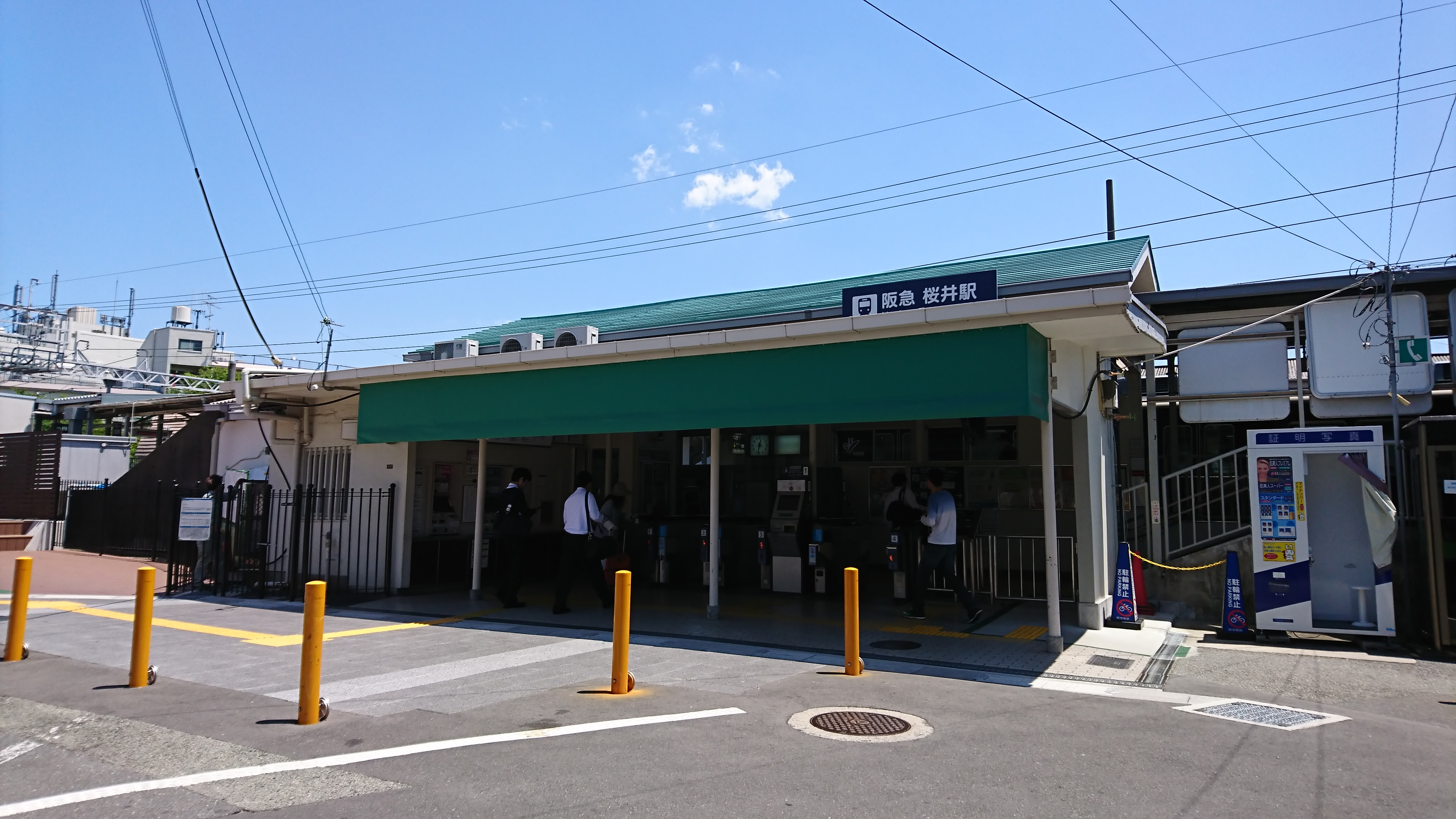
- Sakurai Station, May 2018

General information
- Location: 2-chōme-2 Sakurai, Minoh-shi, Osaka-fu 562-0043
- Coordinates: 34°49′0.42″N 135°27′38.53″E
- Operator: Hankyu Railway
- Line: ■ Minoo Line
- Distance: 1.7 km (1.1 miles) from Ishibashi handai-mae.
- Platforms: 2 side platforms
- Tracks: 2

Construction
- Accessible: yes

Other information
- Status: Staffed
- Station code: HK-57
- Website: Official website

History
- Opened: April 10, 1910

Passengers
- FY2023: 8,721 daily

Services
Preceding station	Hankyu Railway	Following station
Ishibashi handai-mae HK-48 Terminus	Minoo Line Local Semi-Express	Makiochi HK-58 towards Minoo
Location
- Location within Osaka Prefecture Location within Japan

Sakurai Station (桜井駅, Sakurai-eki; station number: HK-57) is a passenger railway station located in the city of Minoh, Osaka Prefecture, Japan. It is operated by the private transportation company Hankyu Railway.

== Lines ==
Sakurai Station is served by the Hankyu Minoo Line, and is located 1.6 kilometers from the terminus of the line at Ishibashi handai-mae.

== Layout ==
The station consists of two opposed side platforms connected by an underground passage.

=== Platforms ===
1	■ Minoo Line	for Minoo
2	■ Minoo Line	for Ishibashi handai-mae, Osaka-umeda, and Takarazuka

== History ==
Sakurai Station opened on 10 April 1910.

Station numbering was introduced to all Hankyu stations on 21 December 2013 with this station being designated as station number HK-57.

== Passenger statistics ==
In FY2023, the station was used by an average of 8,721 passengers daily (Note: Data published by the Ministry of Land, Infrastructure, Transport and Tourism state the number of passengers boarding and disembarking by station in a given year. FY2023 covers the period from 1 April 2023 to 31 March 2024. Data published by individual railways directly may state the number boarding only.)

== Surrounding area ==
The area around the station is lined with shops, supermarkets, convenience stores, and condominiums, and the Sakuragaoka area to the northwest of the station is a quiet residential area.

- Japan National Route 171
- Minoh City Minami Elementary School

== See also ==
- List of railway stations in Japan
