= Osaka Aoyama College =

Higher education institution in Osaka Prefecture, Japan

Coordinates: 34°50′2.6″N 135°27′25″E

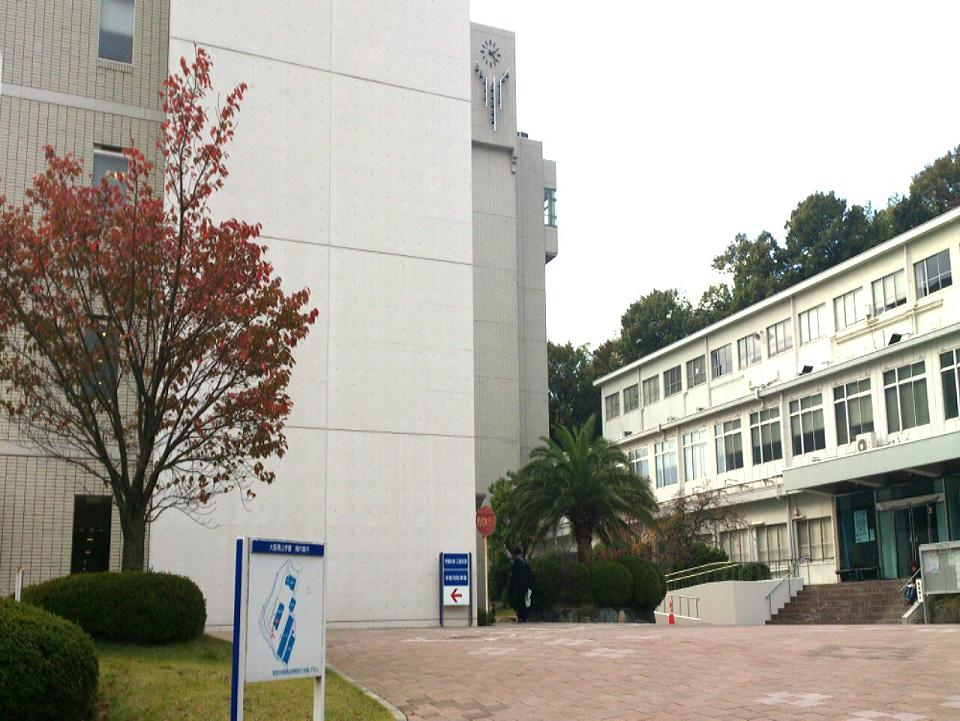

Osaka Aoyama University (大阪青山大学, Ōsaka aoyama daigaku) is a private university in Minoh, Osaka, Japan, established in 2005.
