= Katsuō-ji =

Buddhist temple in Minoh, Osaka, Japan

Katsuo-ji
- 勝尾寺
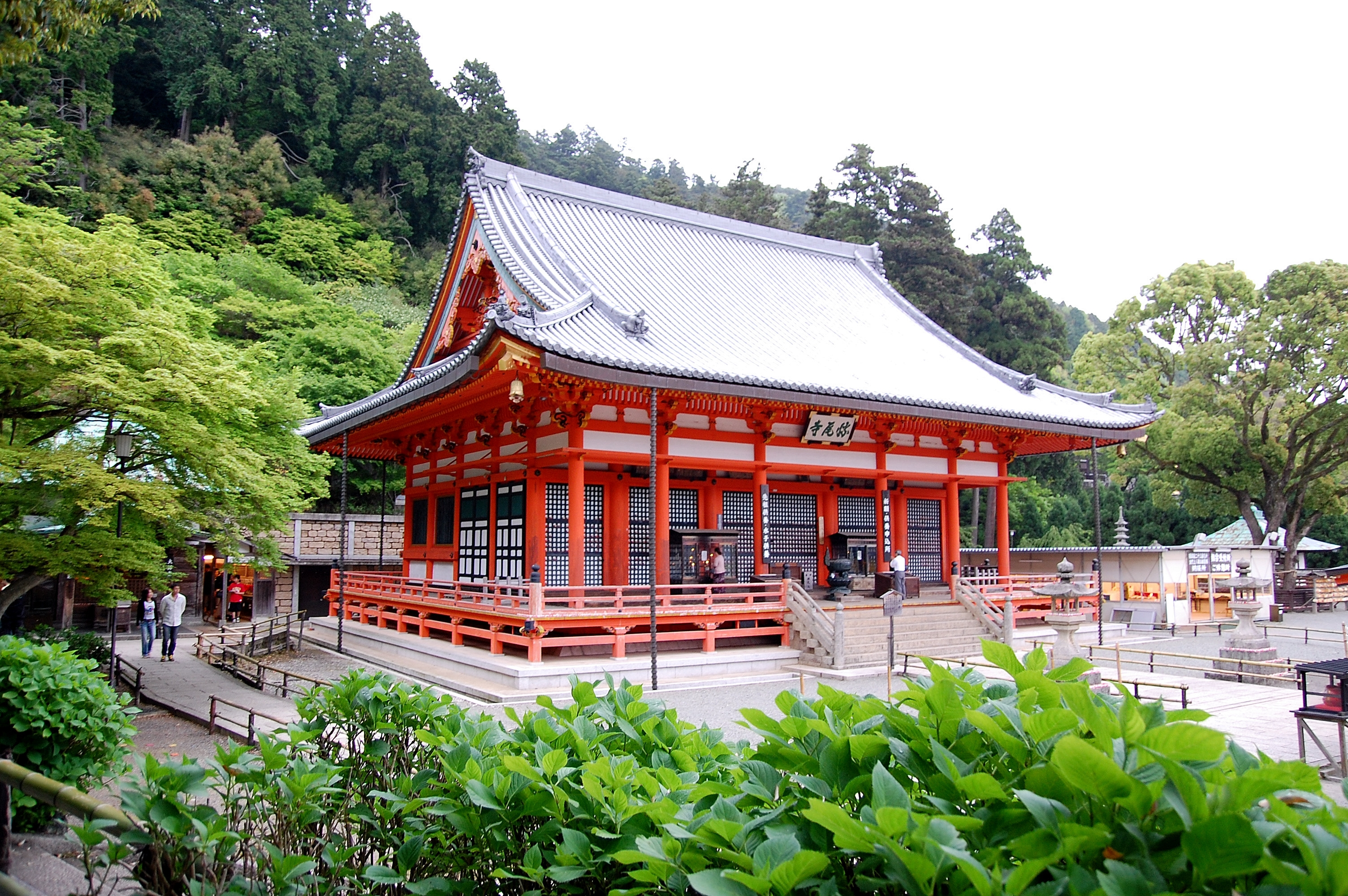
- Katsuō-ji Hondō

- Location within Osaka Prefecture Location within Japan

Religion
- Affiliation: Buddhist
- Deity: Senjū Jūichimen Kannon Bosatsu
- Rite: Kōyasan Shingon-shū
- Status: functional

Location
- Location: 2914-1 Aomatani, Minoh-shi, Osaka-fu
- Coordinates: 34°51′57″N 135°29′28″E

Architecture
- Founder: c.Kaisei
- Completed: c.725

Website
- Official website
- National Important Cultural Property National Historic Site of Japan

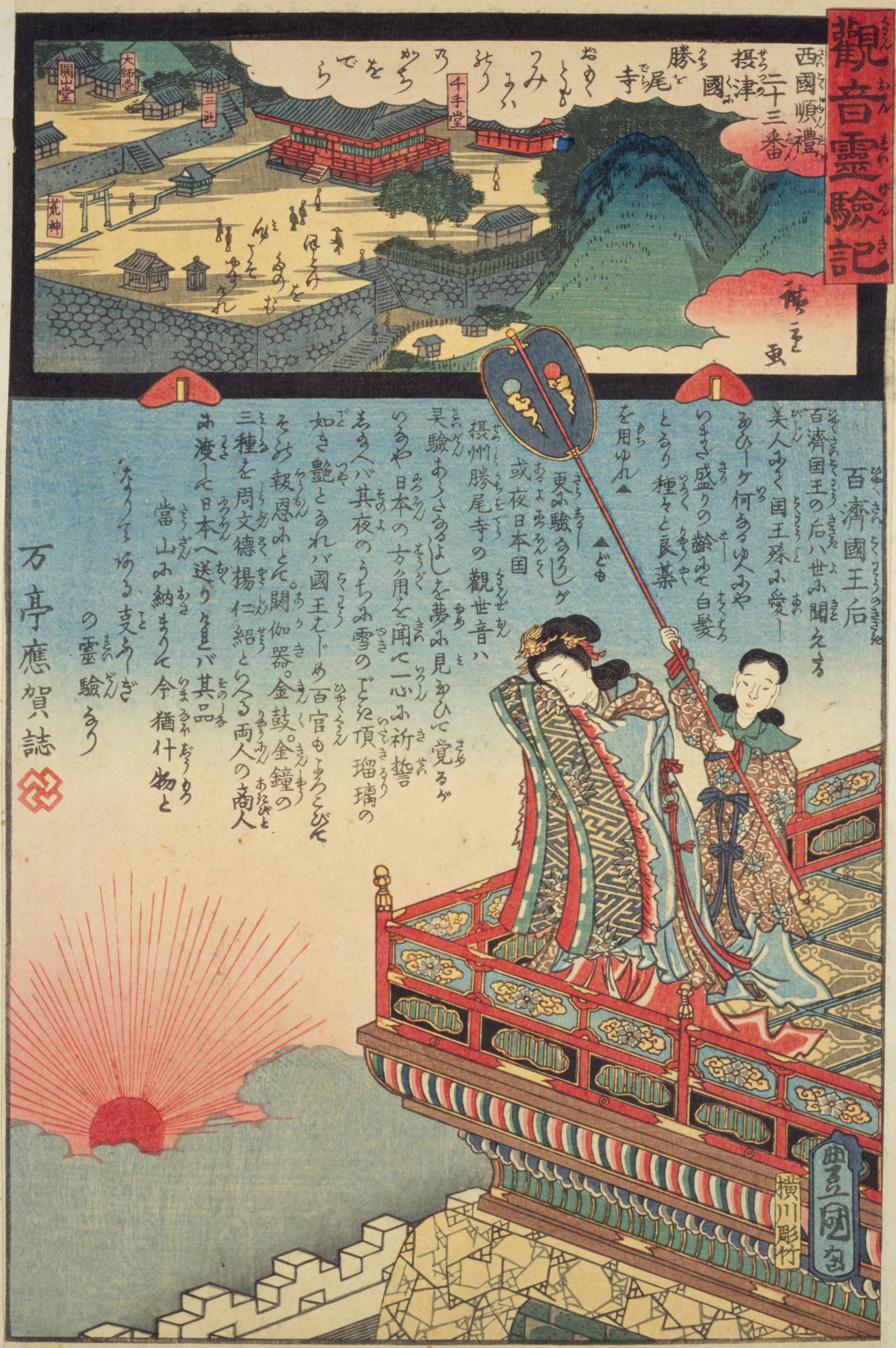
from the picture album "Kannon Reigen ki"

Katsuō-ji (勝尾寺) is a Buddhist temple located in the Aomatani neighborhood of the city of Minoh, Osaka Prefecture, Japan. It belongs to the Kōyasan Shingon-shū sect of Japanese Buddhism and its honzon is a statue of Senjū Jūichimen Kannon Bosatsu. The temple's full name is Ocho-san Katsuō-ji (応頂山 勝尾寺).The temple is the 23rd stop on the Saigoku Kannon Pilgrimage route. The temple's precincts with its intact set of boundary markers was designated a National Historic Site of Japan in 1966.

== Overview ==
The origins of the temple are uncertain. According to the Katsuō-ji Engi, a chronicle kept at the temple, in 727, the brothers Zenchū and Zensan, sons of Fujiwara no Tomofusa, arrived in the area, devoted themselves to Buddhist training, and established a hermitage. This marked the beginning of the temple. Approximately 40 years later, in 765, Kaisei, the son of Emperor Kōnin (and half-brother of Emperor Kanmu), studied under the two brothers and entered the Buddhist priesthood. In 775, Kaisei fulfilled his long-cherished wish to complete the transcription of 600 volumes of the Great Perfection of Wisdom Sutra. He dedicated the manuscript to a newly constructed hall, which he named Miroku-ji. This is said to be the direct founding of the temple. A few years later, in 780, Myōkan is said to have sculpted the principal image, a standing statue of the Senjū Jūichimen Kannon. While there is no documentary evidence to corroborate any of this story, and much is unknown, there are other temples in the mountainous areas of the region that are claimed to have been founded or restored by Kaisei, such as Kamiminesan-ji in Takatsuki, Osaka.

Since the Heian period, the temple has flourished as a center of mountain worship, and has been visited by many emperors and other nobles.In 880, the head priest conducted a procession to pray for the recovery of Emperor Seiwa, and the emperor bestowed the name "Shōō-ji" (勝王寺) on the temple. However, the name could also mean "to defeat the king," was deemed inappropriate, and the temple was renamed Katsuō-ji. The Nihon Sandai Jitsuroku records the death of Emperor Seiwa in 880, mentioning the emperor's pilgrimage to Mount Katsuō, marking the first documented mention of Katsuō-ji. The entire temple was burned down during the Battle of Ichinotani in 1184, but was rebuilt in 1188 by order of Minamoto no Yoritomo, under the direction of Kumagai Naozane and Kajiwara Kagetoki. From 1208 to 1210, Hōnen stayed at the temple after returning from exile in Sanuki Province. In 1269, Emperor Go-Saga appointed three ajari priests, and the temple was appointed an official place of prayer for the Imperial family. In 1423, the fourth shōgun of the Muromachi shogunate, Ashikaga Yoshimochi, designated the temple as a prayer temple for the shōgun's family. Katsuō-ji was destroyed by fire again on February 14, 1495.

In 1603, Toyotomi Hideyori rebuilt the main gate and donated funds for the reconstruction of the main hall. In 1674, during the Edo period, it became a branch temple of Shakamon-in Temple at Mount Kōya, and changed its sect from Tendai to Shingon.

== "Winner's Luck" and Daruma ==
The word "katsu" in the temple's name refers to winning. People buy daruma dolls hoping to obtain "winner's luck". If the wish is fulfilled, the daruma is often returned to the temple and left somewhere on the grounds.

Daruma Dolls

Temple waterfall

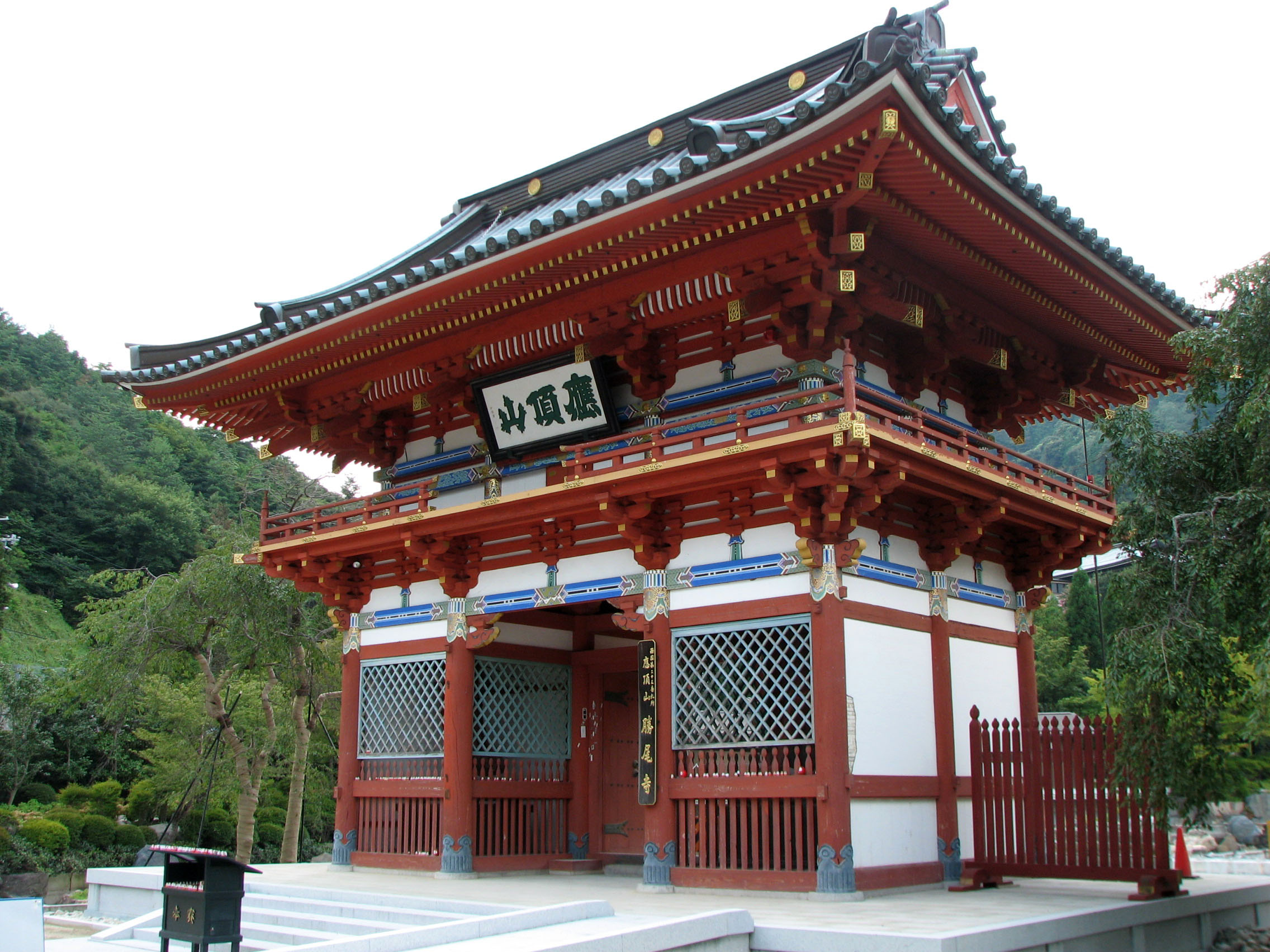
Sanmon

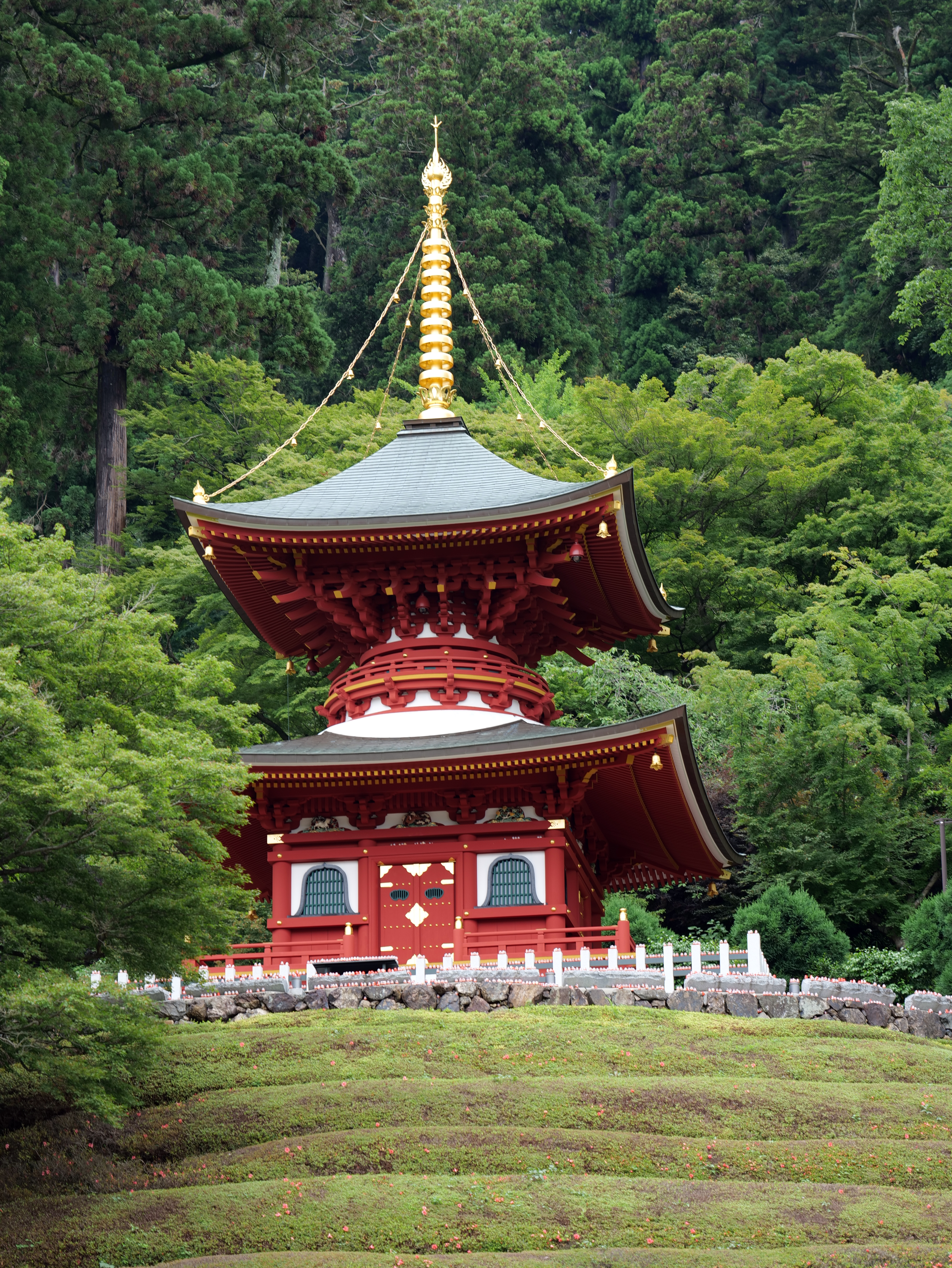
Tahōtō

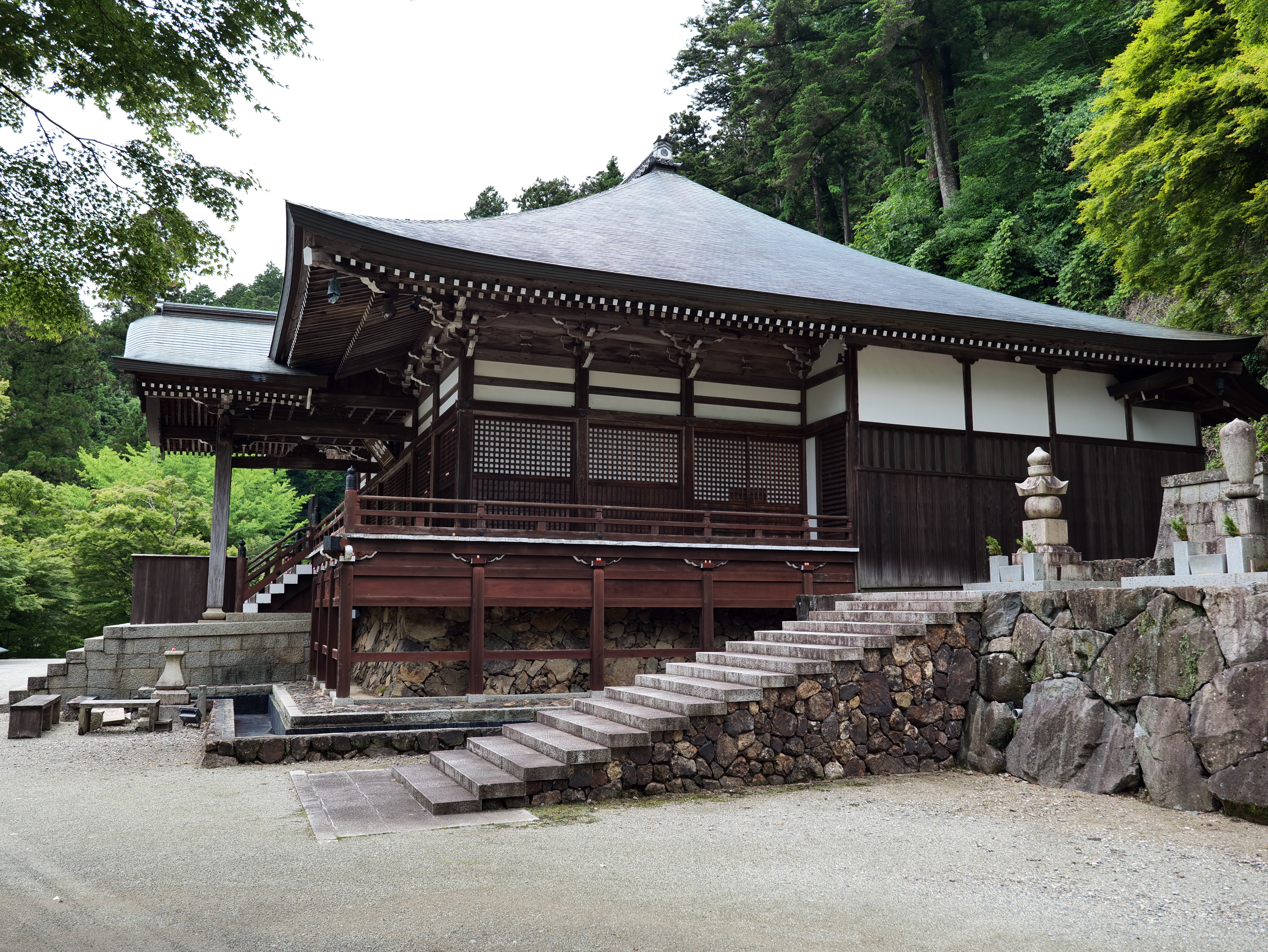
Nikai-dō

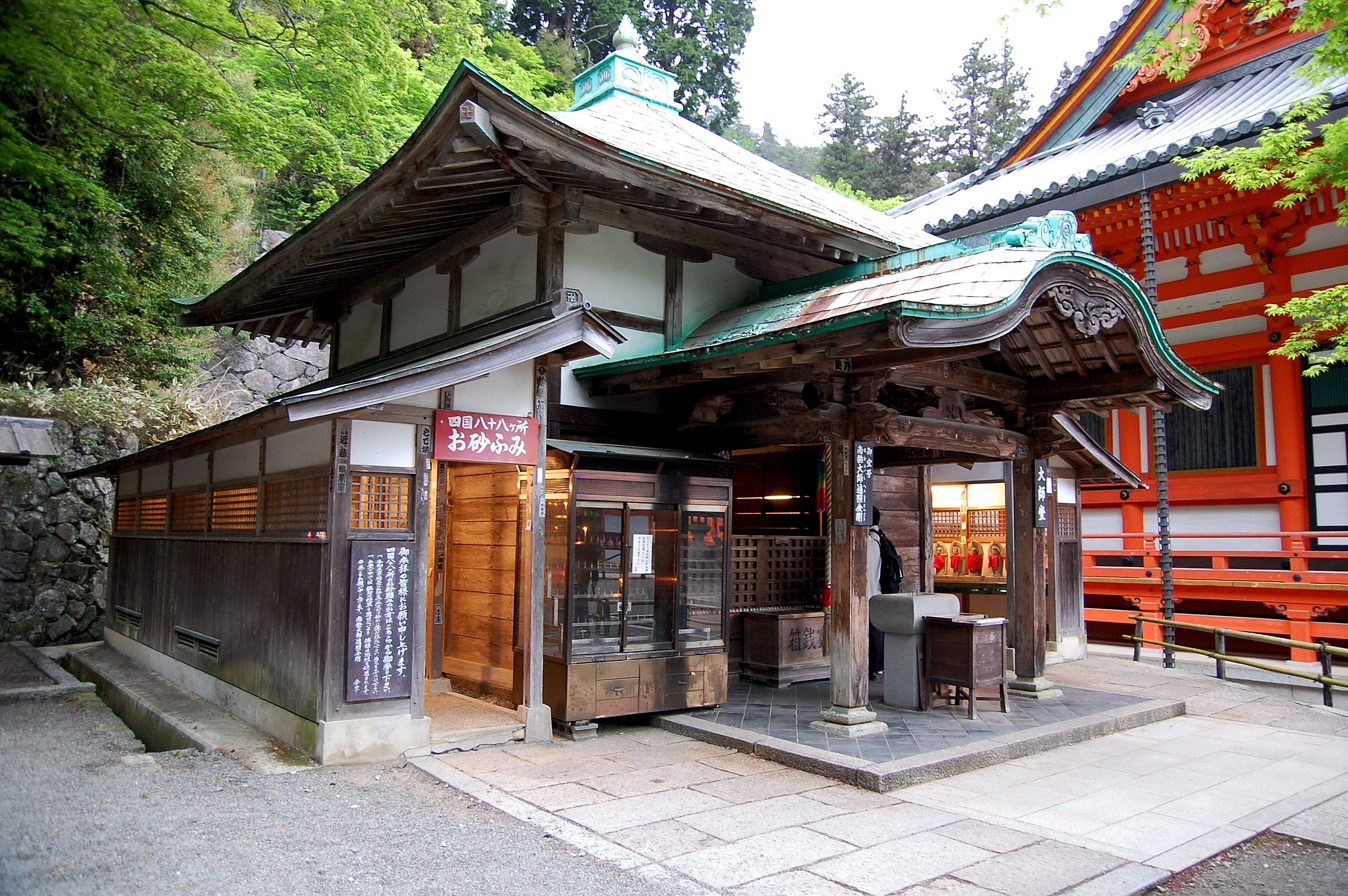
Daishi-do

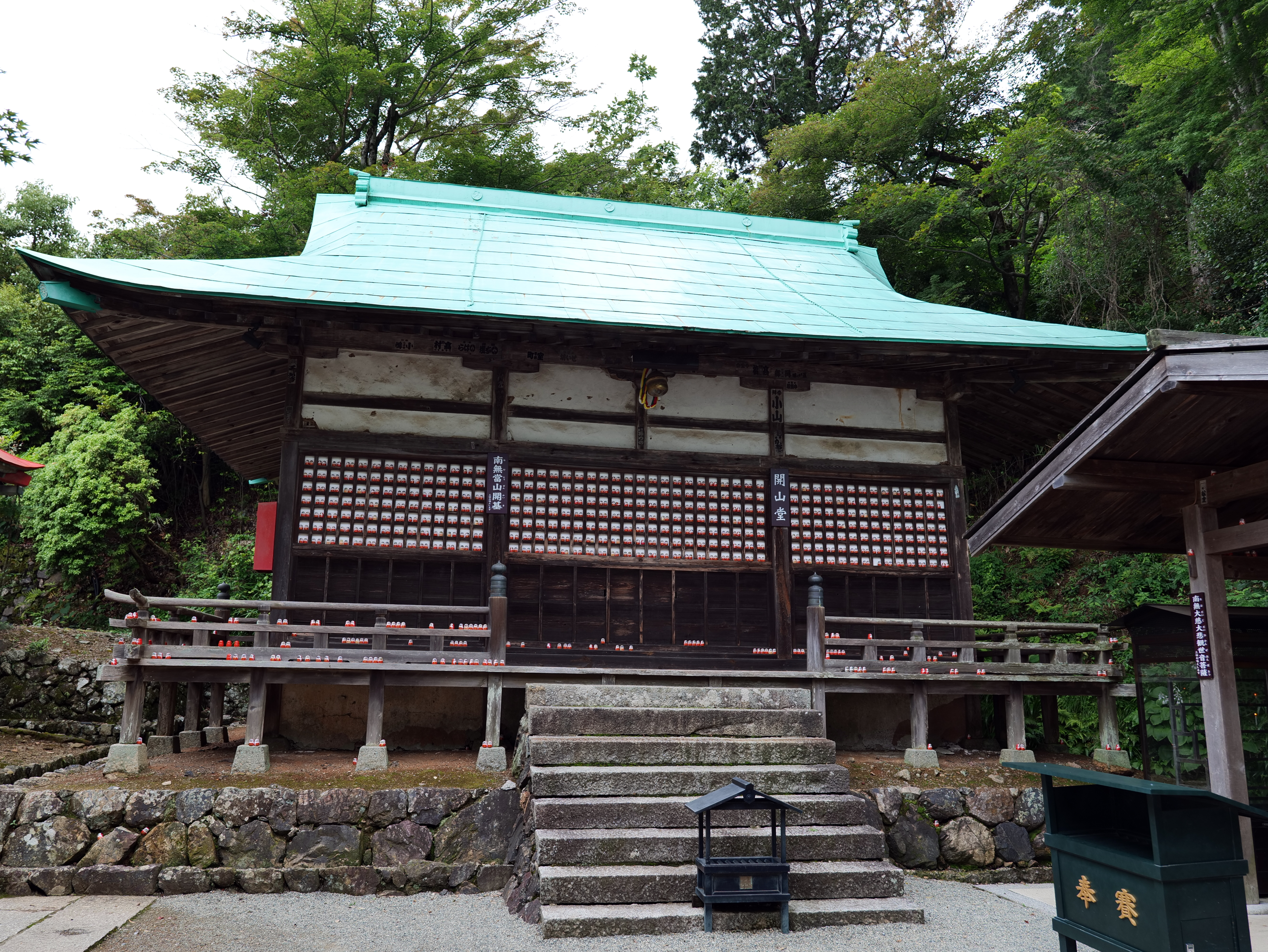
Kaizen-dō

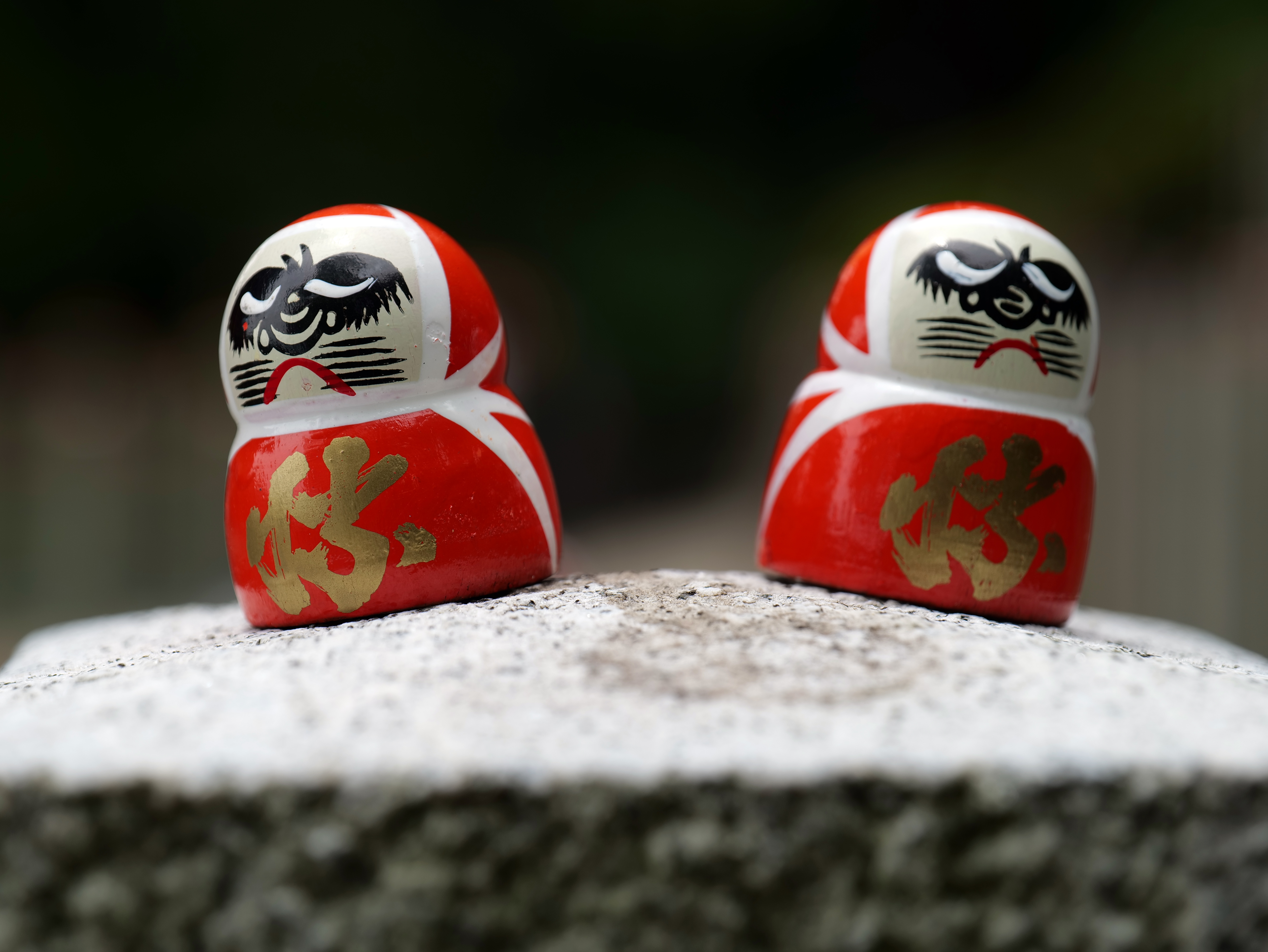
Daruma

The temple is located approximately eight kilometers or 20 minutes by car northeast of Minoo Station on the Hankyu Railway.

== Cultural Properties ==
=== National Important Cultural Properties ===
- Wooden statue of standing Yakushi Nyorai with attendants (木造薬師如来及両脇侍像), early Heian period. All three statues, from the statue itself to the lotus base, roofing, and stem, are carved from a single piece of hinoki cypress wood. The central statue's solemn features and thick knees beneath its swirling spiral hair, the attendants' short, broad bodies and flower-shaped topknots, and the twelve-sided, three-tiered lotus petals lining the tall lotus base of each pedestal, all retain a distinctly early Heian period aesthetic, suggesting that the creation of this triad is likely to date to the late 9th or early 10th century.
- Lotus Sutra inscribed on paper with ink (紙本墨書法華経 巻第四); four scrolls. Heian period.
- Hatten Ishikura (八天石蔵); eight sets, Kamakura period. These are small stone storehouses erected as a markers indicating Katsuō-ji's precinct boundaries. Each contained one bronze statue placed in a Shigaraki ware container and were buried with a stone platform built on top.

The statues included the Four Heavenly Kings and the Four Wisdom Kings. They were first mentioned in temple documents in 1230. However, due to lack of maintenance, the storehouses have fallen into disrepair and neglect, and archaeological excavations were conducted in 1962-1963, and the statues and their containers were designated Important Cultural Properties.

=== Osaka Prefecture Tangible Cultural Properties ===
- Stone Gorintō (石造五輪塔), Kamakura period; Machiishi are marker stones erected every 1 chō (approximately 109 meters) along pilgrimage routes to temples and shrines. A total of 36 are erected along the old approach to Katsuō-ji, from the large torii gate facing the Saigoku Kaidō road at the entrance to the temple gate. They are in the form of five-ringed stupas, each representing the five elements of earth, water, fire, wind, and space, stacked in order in square, circular, triangular, crescent, and jewel-shaped stones. Eight of these monuments, from the lower stupa in front of the gate to the seventh, are recognized as having been erected in 1247 based on their tower-shaped design and records in the Katsuō-ji Documents, making them the oldest examples in Japan. These monuments are also covered as part of the National Historic Site designation.
- Wooden statue of standing Senjū Kannon (木造千手観音立像), Heian period
- Wooden statue of a Kami (木造男神立像), Heian period
- Katsuō-ji old documents (勝尾寺文書), 1193 items, Heian-Edo period
- Colored silk painting of an Amida Triad (絹本著色阿弥陀三尊像), Kamakura period

== See also ==
- List of Historic Sites of Japan (Osaka)
