= Ishibashi handai-mae Station =

Railway station in Ikeda, Osaka Prefecture, Japan

Ishibashi handai-mae 石橋阪大前
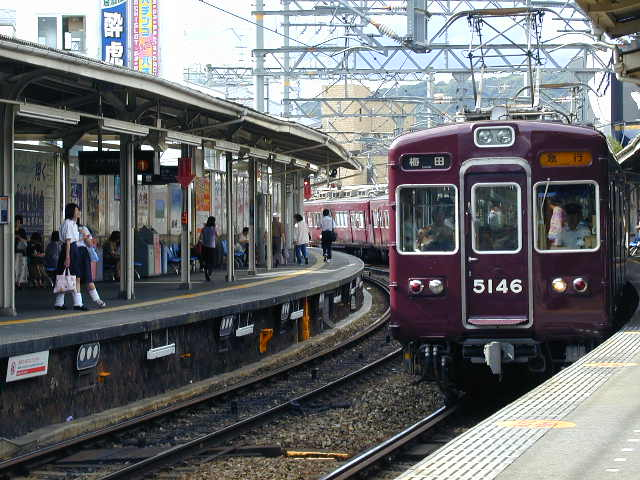
- Umeda-bound Express at Ishibashi

General information
- Location: Ishibashi Nichome, Ikeda, Osaka （大阪府池田市石橋二丁目） Japan
- Coordinates: 34°48′29″N 135°26′44″E
- Operator: Hankyu Corporation
- Lines: Takarazuka Main Line; Minoo Line

Other information
- Station code: HK-48

History
- Opened: 1910
- Former names: Ishibashi (until 2019)
Services
Preceding station	Hankyu Railway	Following station
Hotarugaike HK-47 towards Osaka-umeda	Takarazuka Main Line Local Express	Ikeda HK-49 towards Takarazuka
Hotarugaike HK-47 towards Osaka-umeda	Takarazuka Main Line Semi-Express	Ikeda HK-49 One-way operation
Toyonaka HK-46 towards Osaka-umeda	Takarazuka Main Line Commuter Limited Express	Ikeda HK-49 One-way operation
Jūsō HK-03 towards Osaka-umeda	Nissei Express	Ikeda HK-49 towards Nissei-chuo
Terminus	Minoo Line Local	Sakurai HK-57 towards Minoo
through to Takarazuka Main Line	Minoo Line Local	Sakurai HK-57 One-way operation
Location

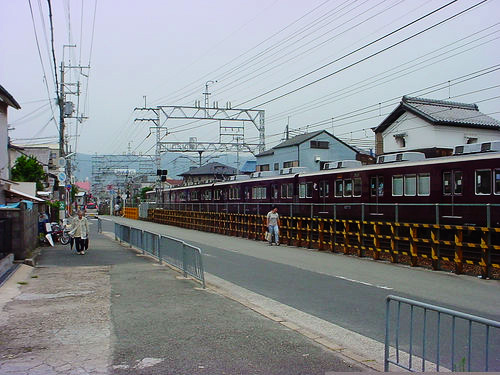
The school/residential area just south of Ishibashi in Toyonaka.

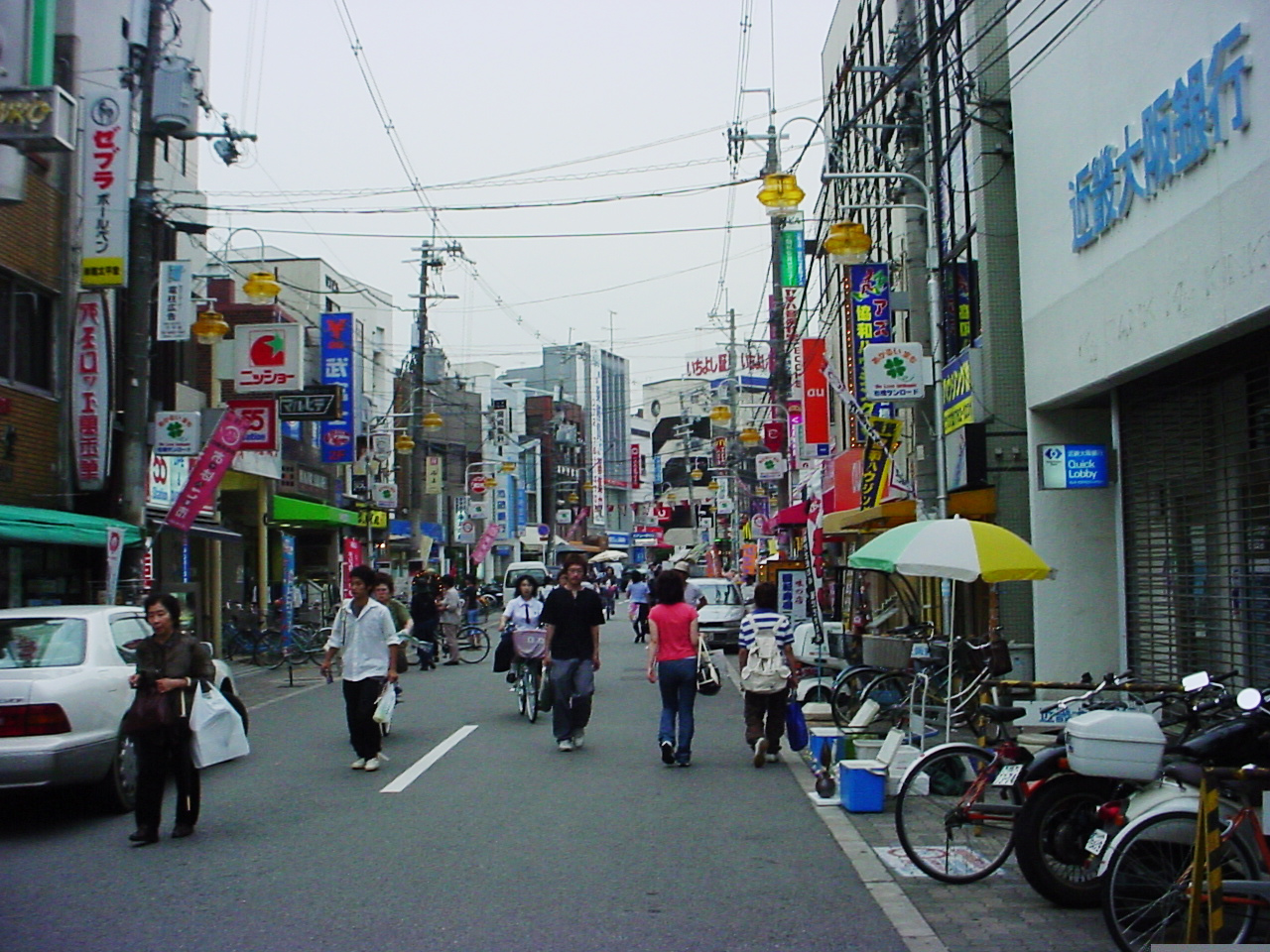
The uncovered part of the Ishibashi area shopping street in Ikeda.

Ishibashi handai-mae Station (石橋阪大前駅, Ishibashi handai-mae eki; station number: HK-48) is a train station located in Ikeda, Osaka, but is on the border with Toyonaka to the south and Minoh to the east. It serves as a transfer point for the Hankyu Minoo Line on one side and on the other side is an express station on the Hankyu Takarazuka Line．The station has five platforms connected by tunnels, two for Osaka-Takarazuka service, and three for Minoo service.

The station is near to one of the three campuses of Osaka University, though the campus is physically located in neighbouring Toyonaka City. The station is surrounded by bars, karaoke boxes, and izakaya restaurants along with more traditional small-stall shopping streets.

The word Ishibashi literally means Stone Bridge, referring to the old stone street bridge immediately north of the station over a small river that serves as the northern end of the shopping area, which is called Akai hashi.

== Layout ==
There are three platforms with five tracks on the ground level.

1	■ Takarazuka Line	for Takarazuka, Kiyoshikojin, Kawanishi-noseguchi and Nigawa
2	■ Takarazuka Line	from Takarazuka and Kawanishi-noseguchi for Umeda, Kobe, Kyoto and Kita-Senri
3	■ Mino-o Line	mainly from the Takarazuka Line for Mino-o
4	■ Takarazuka Line	from the Mino-o Line for Umeda, Kobe, Kyoto and Kita-Senri
5	■ Mino-o Line	returning for Minoo

== History ==
The station opened concurrently with the opening of the Takarazuka Line and the Mino-o Line on 10 March 1910. Since then the structure of the station as an interchange of the two lines has not been largely changed except for the stretched platforms.

On 25 June 1952, hours before the first scheduled train of the day, hundreds of protesters against the Korean War who left a meeting at the Osaka University campus thronged Ishibashi Station and forced station master to run a train to transport them to Osaka. After getting off the forcedly operated train at Hattori Station, they marched and burst into Suita Classification Yard of Japanese National Railways. As a result, more than one hundred people were arrested on charge of riot. The incident is called the Suita Incident.

On October 1, 2019, the station was renamed from Ishibashi to Ishibashi handai-mae,

== See also ==
- List of railway stations in Japan
