= Itsuō Art Museum =

- 逸翁美術館
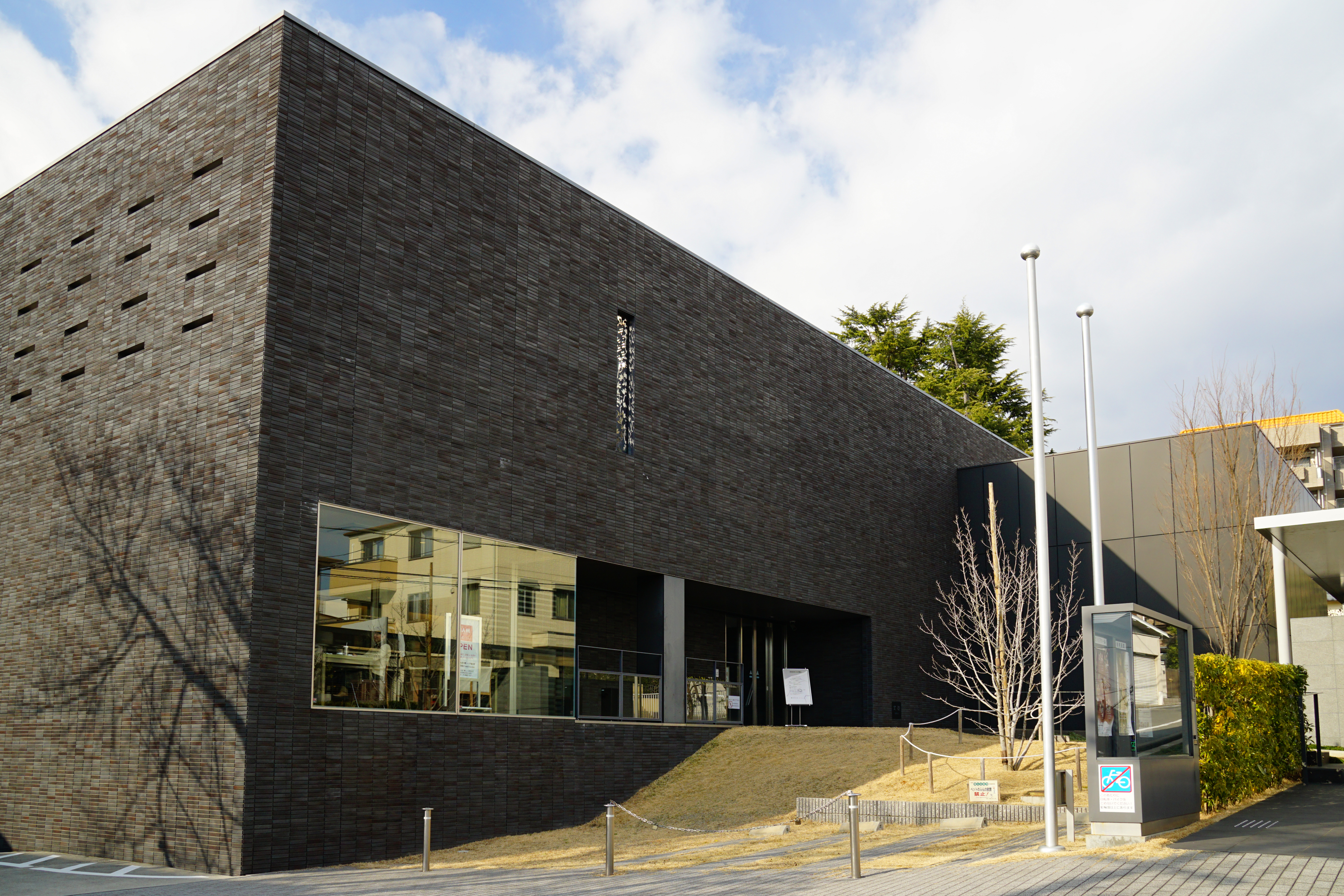

General information
- Location: 12-27 Sakaehonmachi, Ikeda, Osaka Prefecture, Japan
- Coordinates: 34°49′34″N 135°25′51″E
- Opened: 1957; 69 years ago, 1997; 29 years ago New Building

Website
- Official website

Itsuō Art Museum (逸翁美術館, Itsuō Bijutsukan) opened in Ikeda, Osaka Prefecture, Japan, in 1957. The new building opened in 1997. The collection, built up by founder Kobayashi Ichizō, whose pseudonym was Itsuō, comprises some 5,500 works, including fifteen Important Cultural Properties and twenty Important Art Objects.

== Important Cultural Properties ==
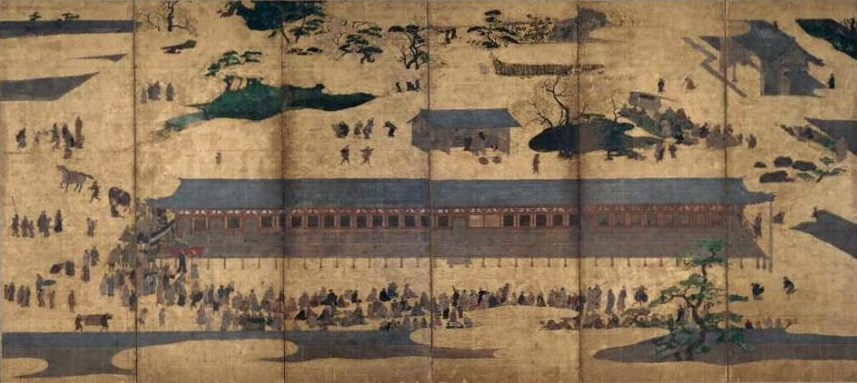
Tōshiya at Sanjūsangen-dō

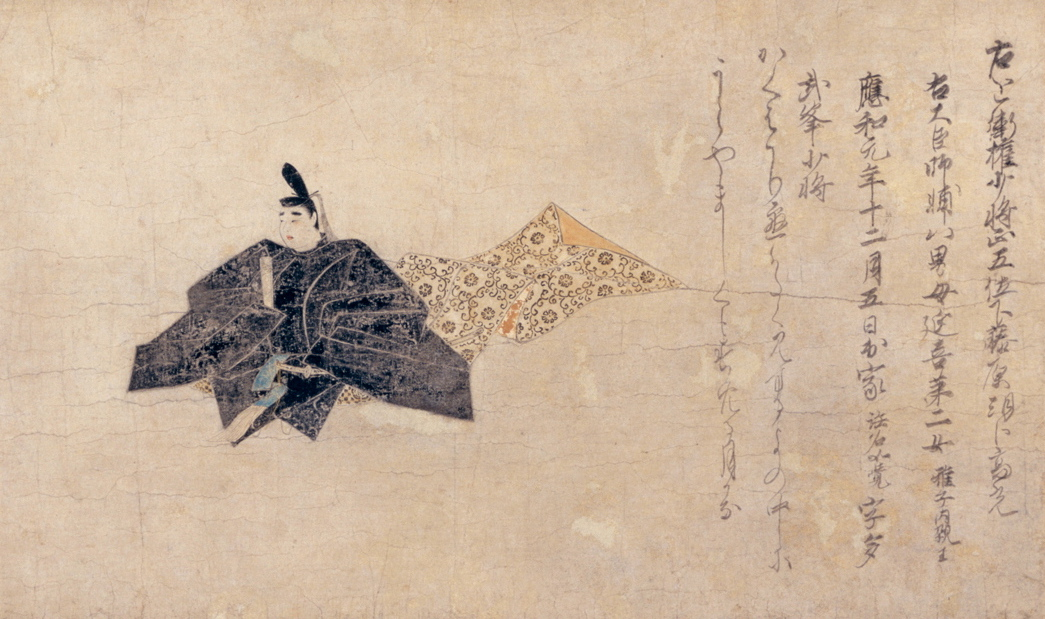
Fujiwara no Takamitsu, one of the Thirty-Six Poetry Immortals

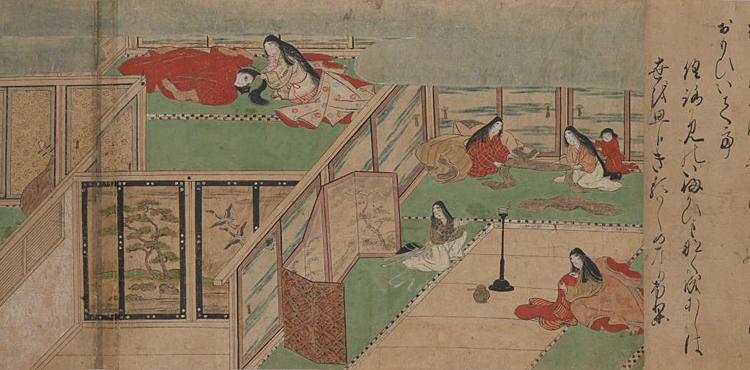
Ashibiki-e

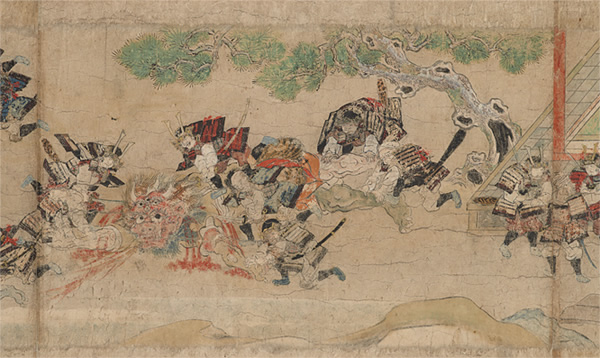
Ōeyama ekotoba

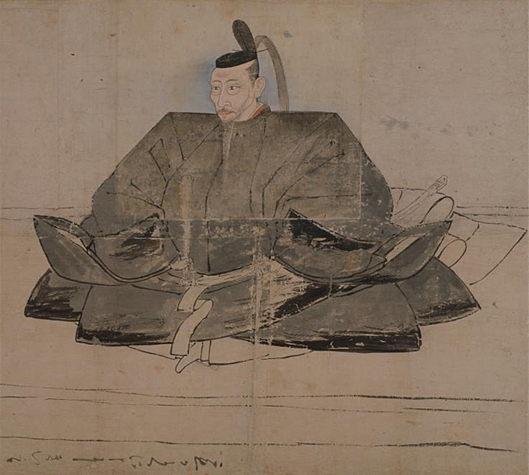
Portrait of Toyotomi Hideyoshi

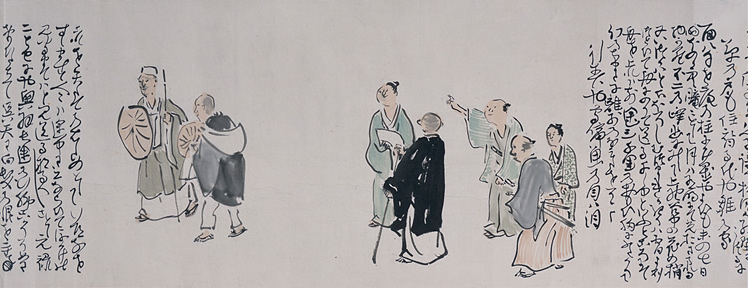
Oku no Hosomichi by Yosa Buson

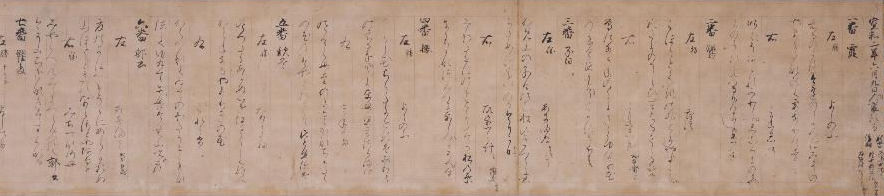
Kanna 2/6/9 Dairi Uta-awase

== See also ==
- Fujita Art Museum
- Kubosō Memorial Museum of Arts, Izumi
- Masaki Art Museum
- Yuki Museum of Art
