= Hankyū Minoo Line =

Railway line in Osaka prefecture, Japan

Hankyu Minoo Line
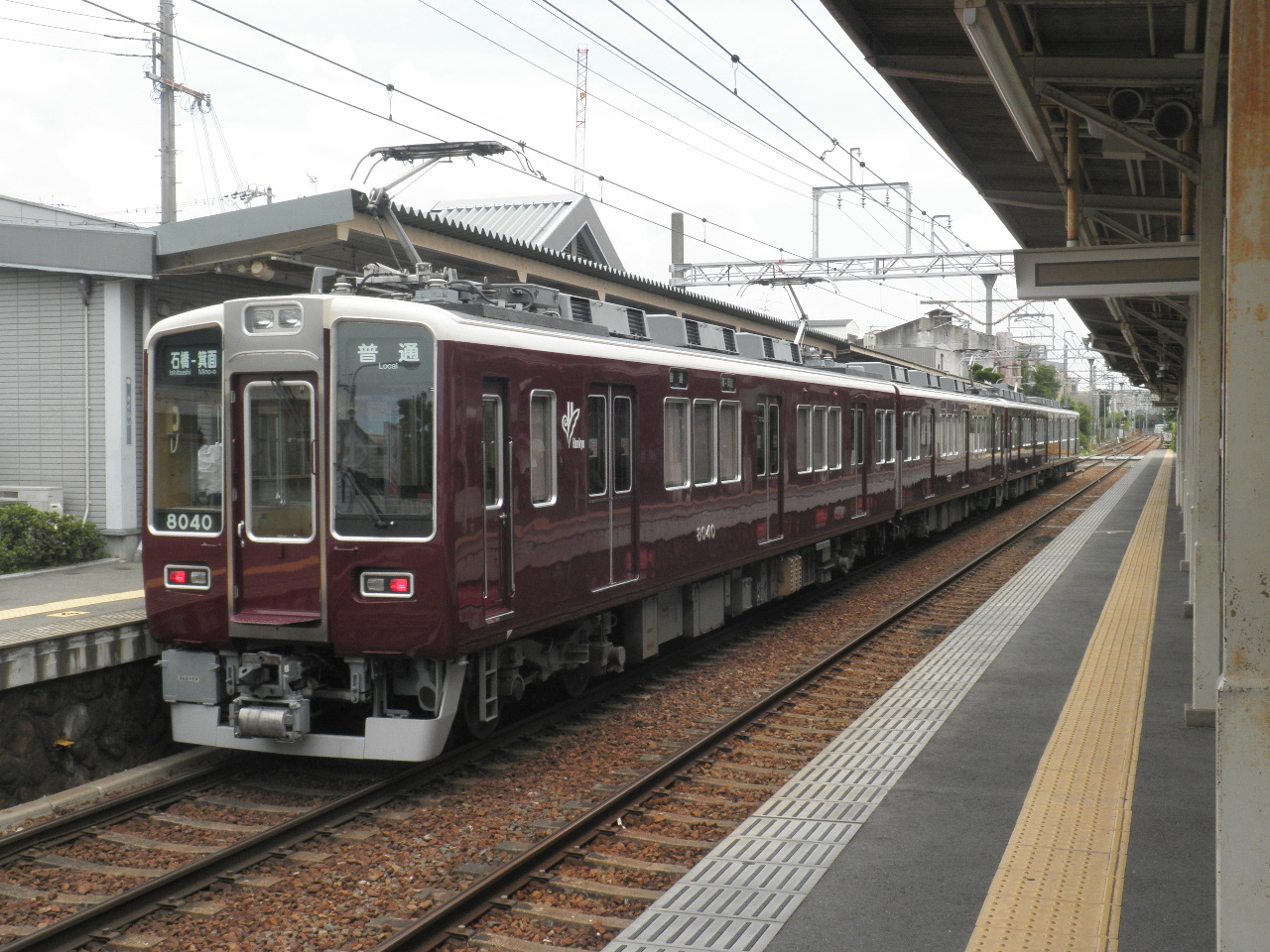
- An 8000 series EMU

Overview
- Native name: 阪急箕面線
- Locale: Kansai
- Stations: 4

Service
- Operator(s): Hankyu Railway
- Depot(s): Hirai Depot

History
- Opened: 10 March 1910; 116 years ago

Technical
- Line length: 4.0 km (2.5 mi)
- Track gauge: 1,435 mm (4 ft 8 1/2 in)
- Electrification: 1,500 V DC, overhead lines
- Operating speed: 80 km/h (50 mph)
Route map

The Hankyū Minoo Line (Japanese: 阪急箕面線, romanized: Mino-o sen) is a Japanese railway line operated by Hankyu Railway which connects Ishibashi handai-mae Station in Ikeda and Minoh, with connecting service to Osaka. The line name and the station name are commonly romanized as "Minō" or "Minoo"; however, the city government officially uses the transliteration "Minoh" in romaji.

== History ==
The Minoo Arima Electric Railway Co. opened the entire line in 1910 as 1435mm gauge dual track, electrified at 600 V DC.

In 1969 the voltage was raised to 1500 V DC.

Through trains to the Takarazuka Main Line to Osaka were reduced in 2019, then discontinued in 2022.

== Services ==
All services on the Minoo Line are Local trains, stopping at every station.

As of March 2025, services operate approximately every 10 minutes from 06:00 to 21:30, with early morning and late night services operating every 12-20 minutes. Running time is 6-7 minutes in both directions.

During daytime hours (09:00-17:00 on weekdays and 09:30-19:00 on weekends and holidays), clock-face scheduling is in use with services departing both ends of the line at 0/10/20/30/40/50 minutes past the hour.

== Stations ==
No.	Name		Distance (km)	Between (km)	Connections	Location
HK-48	Ishibashi handai-mae	石橋阪大前	-	0.0	Takarazuka Main Line	Ikeda
HK-57	Sakurai	桜井	1.6	1.6		Minoh
HK-58	Makiochi	牧落	1.1	2.7		Minoh
HK-59	Minoo	箕面	1.3	4.0		Minoh
