= Minoo Station =

Railway station in Minoh, Osaka Prefecture, Japan

Minoo Station 箕面駅
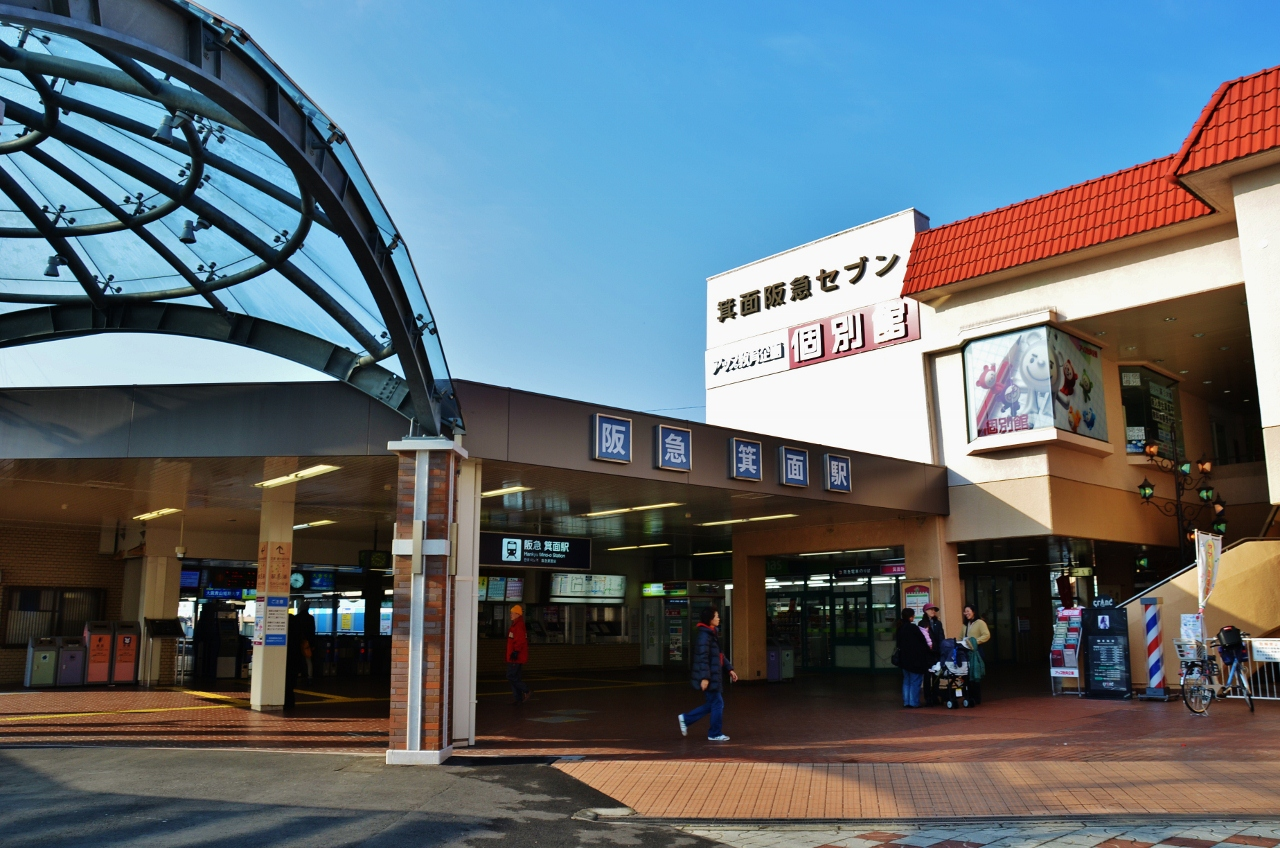
- Minoo Station

General information
- Location: 1-chōme-2 Minoo, Minoh-shi, Osaka-fu 562-0001
- Coordinates: 34°50′6.15″N 135°28′6.10″E
- Operator: Hankyu Railway
- Line: Minoo Line
- Distance: 4.0 km (2.5 miles) from Ishibashi handai-mae
- Platforms: 2 bay platforms
- Tracks: 2

Construction
- Accessible: yes

Other information
- Status: Staffed
- Station code: HK-59
- Website: Official website

History
- Opened: March 10, 1910

Passengers
- FY2023: 11,647 daily

Services
Preceding station	Hankyu Railway	Following station
Makiochi HK-58 towards Ishibashi handai-mae	Minoo Line Local Semi-Express	Terminus
Location
- Location within Osaka Prefecture Location within Japan

Minoo Station (箕面駅, Minoo-eki; station number: HK-59) is a passenger railway station located in the city of Minoh, Osaka Prefecture, Japan. It is operated by the private transportation company Hankyu Railway. The station name is commonly romanized as "Minō" or "Minoo"; however, the city government officially uses the transliteration "Minoh" in romaji.

== Lines ==
Minoo Station is a terminus of the Hankyu Minoo Line, and is located 4.0 kilometers from the terminus of the line at Ishibashi handai-mae.

== Layout ==
The station consists of two bay platforms.

=== Platforms ===
1, 2	■ Minoo Line	for Ishibashi handai-mae, Osaka-umeda, and Takarazuka

== History ==
Minoh Station opened on 10 March 1910 as Minoo Koen Station (箕面公園駅). It was renamed to its present name sometime between 1931 and 1932.

Station numbering was introduced to all Hankyu stations on 21 December 2013 with this station being designated as station number HK-59.

== Passenger statistics ==
In FY2023, the station was used by an average of 11,647 passengers daily. (Note: Data published by the Ministry of Land, Infrastructure, Transport and Tourism state the number of passengers boarding and disembarking by station in a given year. FY2023 covers the period from 1 April 2023 to 31 March 2024. Data published by individual railways directly may state the number boarding only.)

== Surrounding area ==
- Meiji-no-Mori Minoh Quasi-National Park – about 2.7 kilometers (about 40 minutes on foot) to Minoh Falls from the train station

== See also ==
- List of railway stations in Japan
