= Senri New Town =

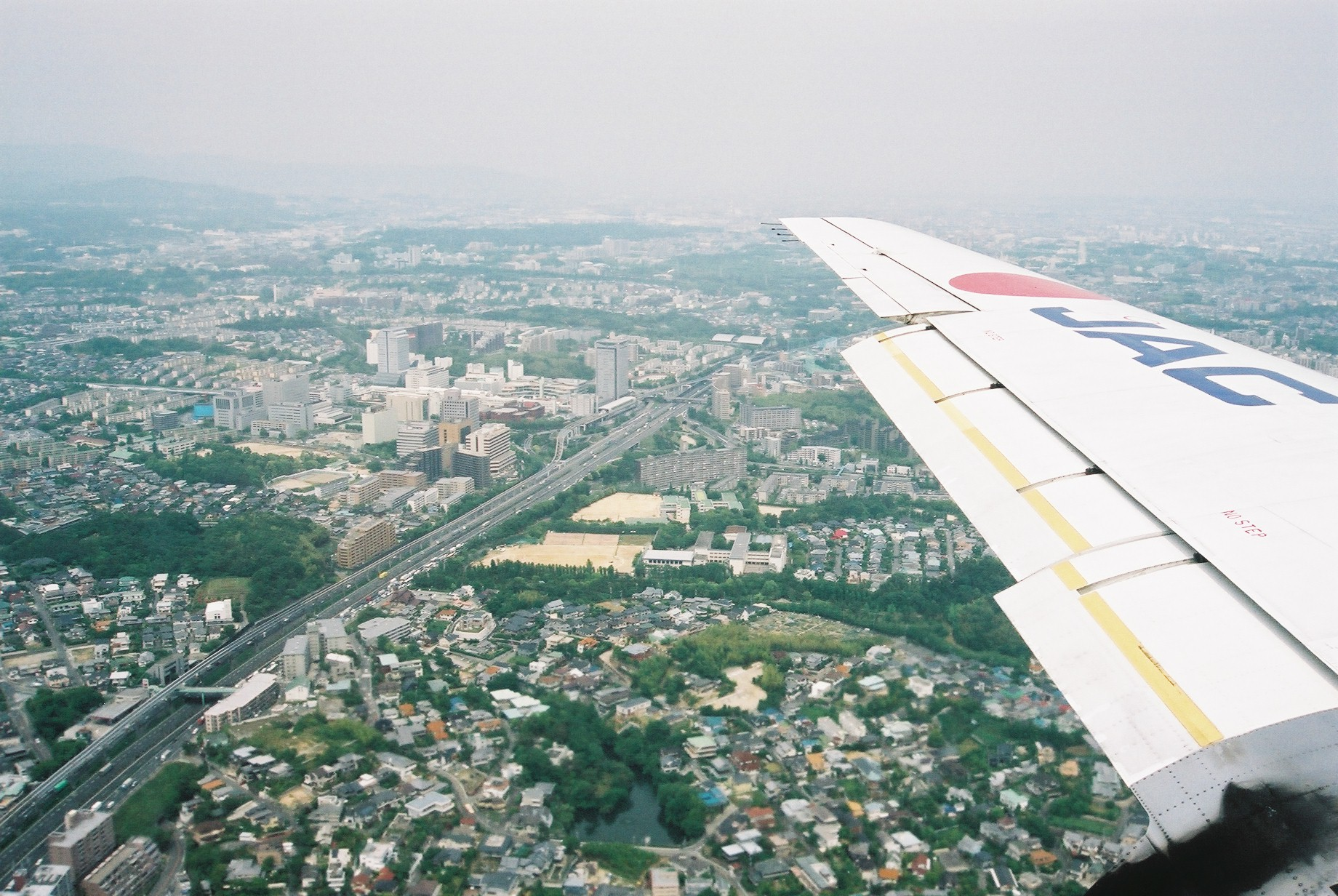
Aerial view of Senri New Town from an aircraft landing at Itami Airport

Senri New Town (千里ニュータウン) is a planned community developed in the cities of Toyonaka and Suita in Osaka Prefecture, Japan, 12 km north of the central business district of Osaka. It covers 1,160 ha and is designed to accommodate a population of 150,000.

It was the first large-scale "new town" development in Japan, and the first community subject to the Japanese residential area development law enacted in 1963. Its development influenced other planned communities in Japan, including the Tama New Town in Tokyo and Kohoku New Town in Yokohama. It remains relatively popular among such communities in Japan due to its proximity to central Osaka and Itami Airport.

== History ==
Announced in 1958, Senri New Town was developed in response to a severe housing shortage in the wake of World War II, using land purchased by the prefectural government to construct around 37,000 residences, including apartment blocks and detached single-family houses. The area consisted of multiple zones approx. 1 km across, each surrounding an elementary school and served by a "neighborhood center" that included shops, community center facilities, and a public bathhouse. The first of these to be completed was the Satakedai area near Minami-Senri Station. Residents moved in from 1962; the area was located near the site of Expo '70 and its development paralleled that of the Expo site.

The area was originally dominated by young nuclear families who were expected to move out as their children grew; however, many stayed in the area into their old age. The population of Senri New Town fell from approx. 130,000 in 1975 to approx. 90,000 in 2005, but grew in the 2010s with new condominium developments around the major train stations. Many houses in the area were rebuilt in the late 1980s during the Japanese asset price bubble, and the collapse of the bubble led to the privatization of corporate housing complexes in the area. This also led to many "neighborhood centers" effectively shutting down.

== Transportation ==
=== Rail access ===
- Kita-Osaka Kyuko Senri-Chuo Station and Momoyamadai Station
- Hankyu Railway Senri Line Kita-Senri Station, Yamada Station and Minami-Senri Station
- Osaka Monorail Main Line Senri-Chuo Station and Yamada Station

=== Road access ===
Road development in the area was sparked by Expo '70. The area is now served by the Meishin Expressway, Chugoku Expressway, and Kinki Expressway. The Mino Toll Road provides road access to Minoh and the Shin-Meishin Expressway.

== Gallery ==
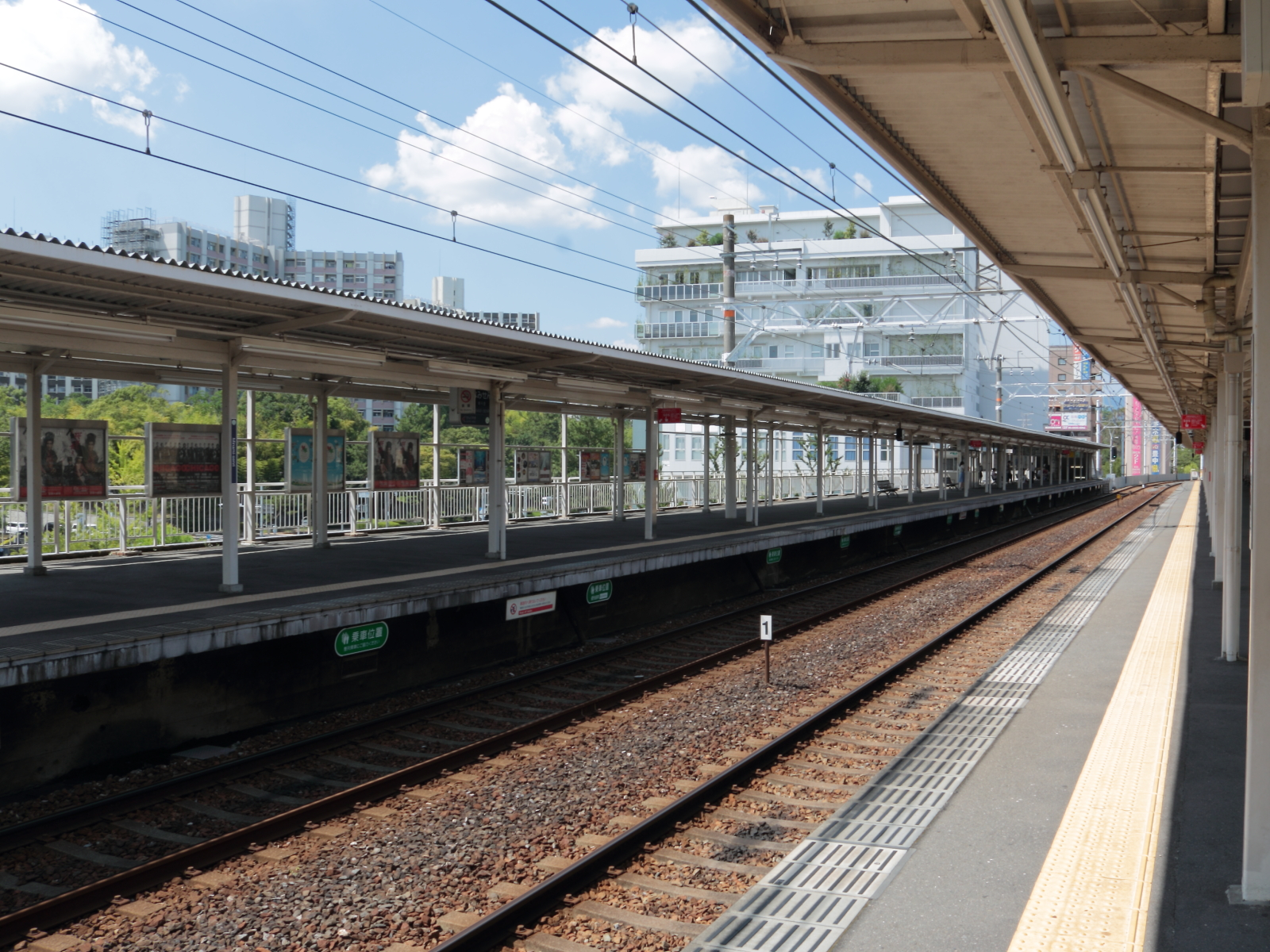
Minami-Senri Station

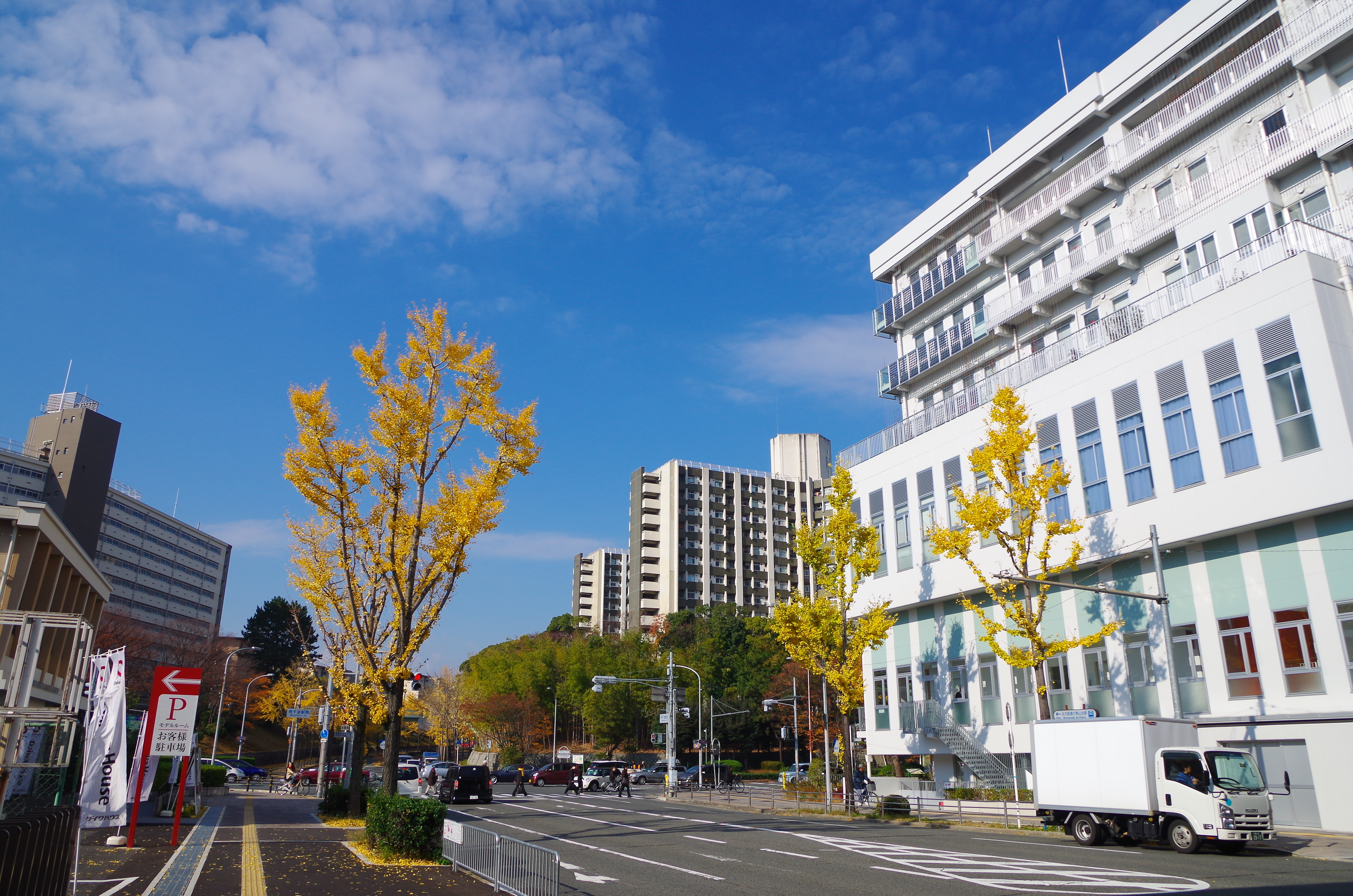
Minami-Senri Station area

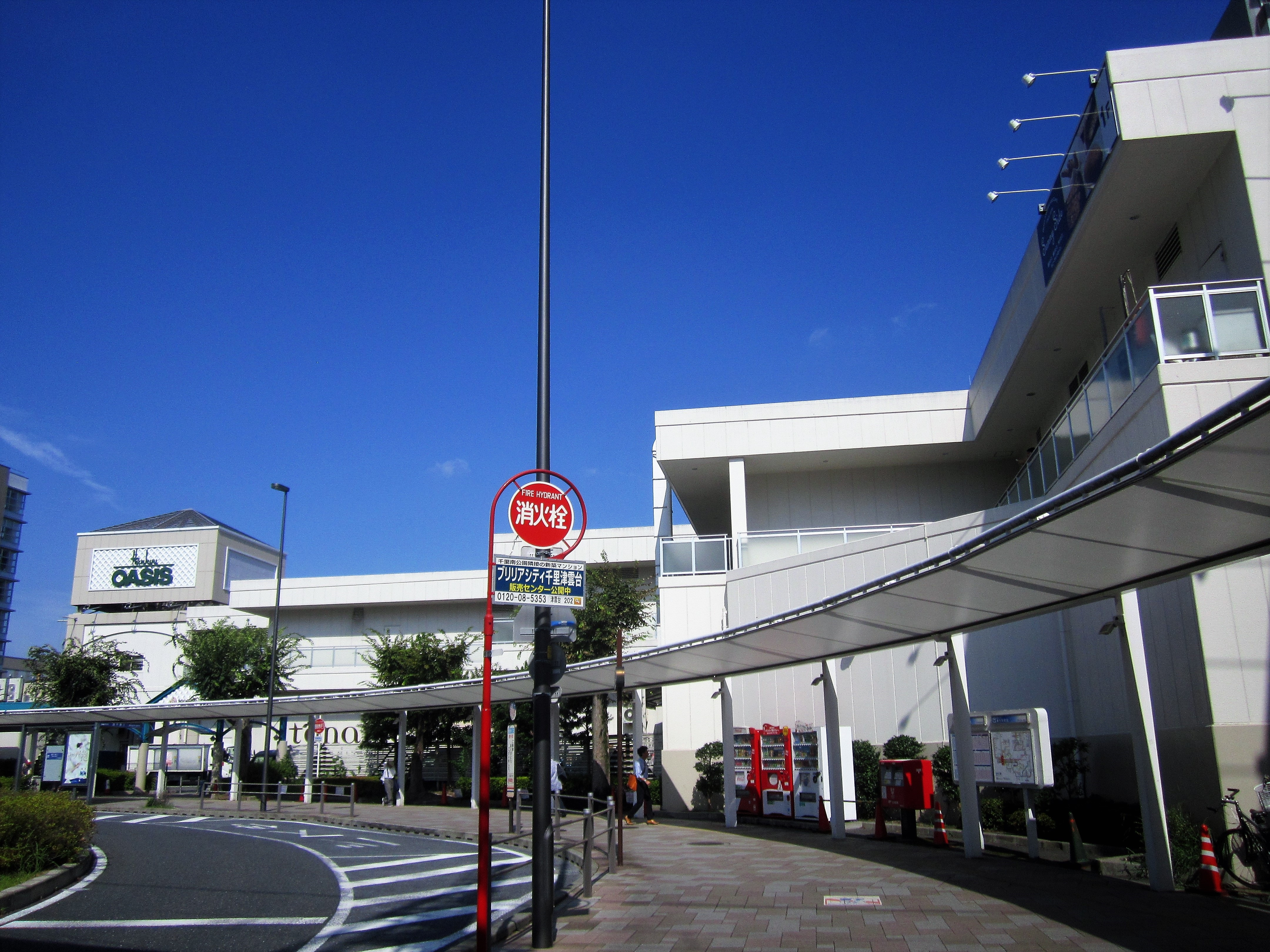
Tonarie Minami-Senri

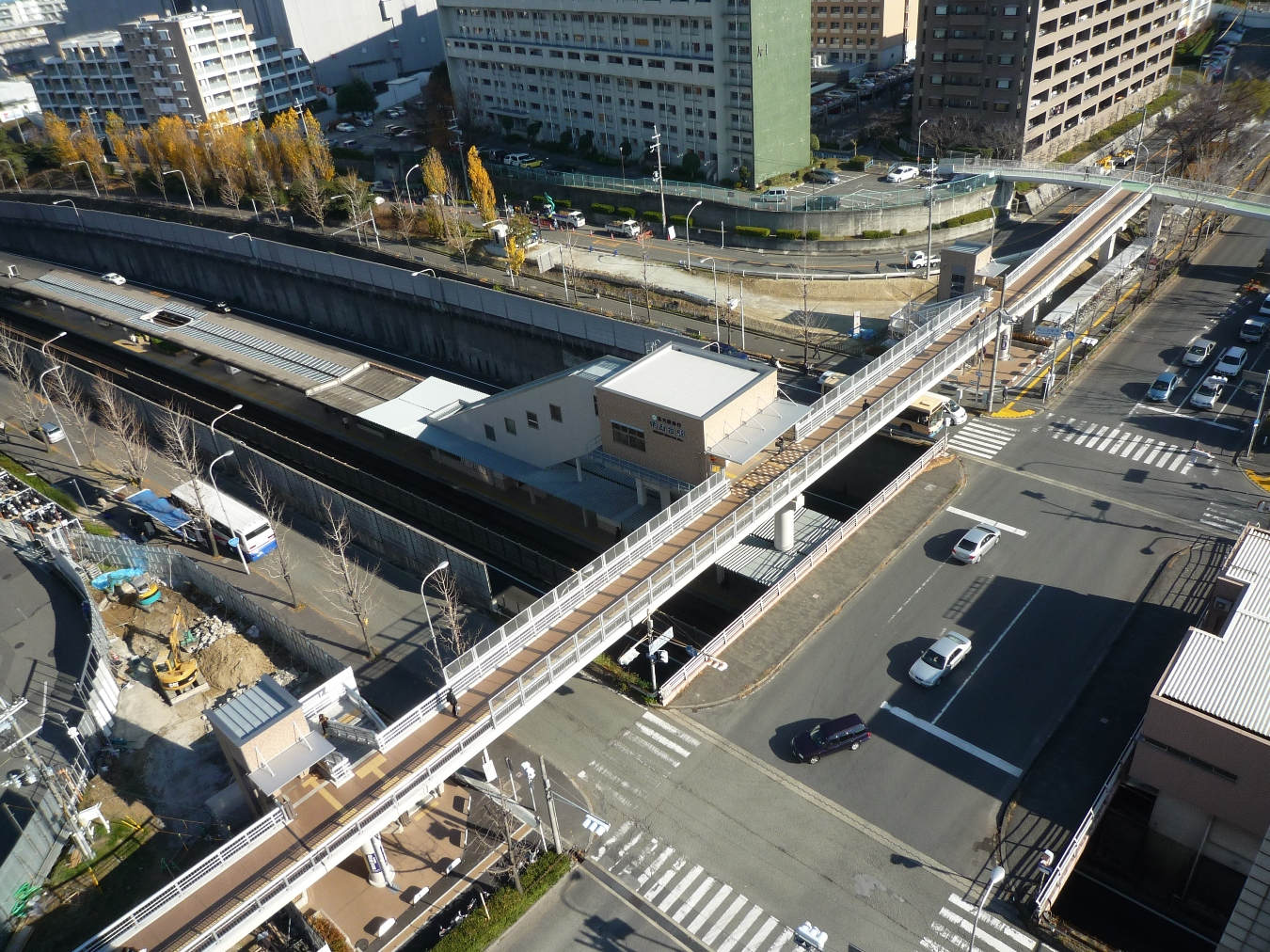
Momoyamadai Station

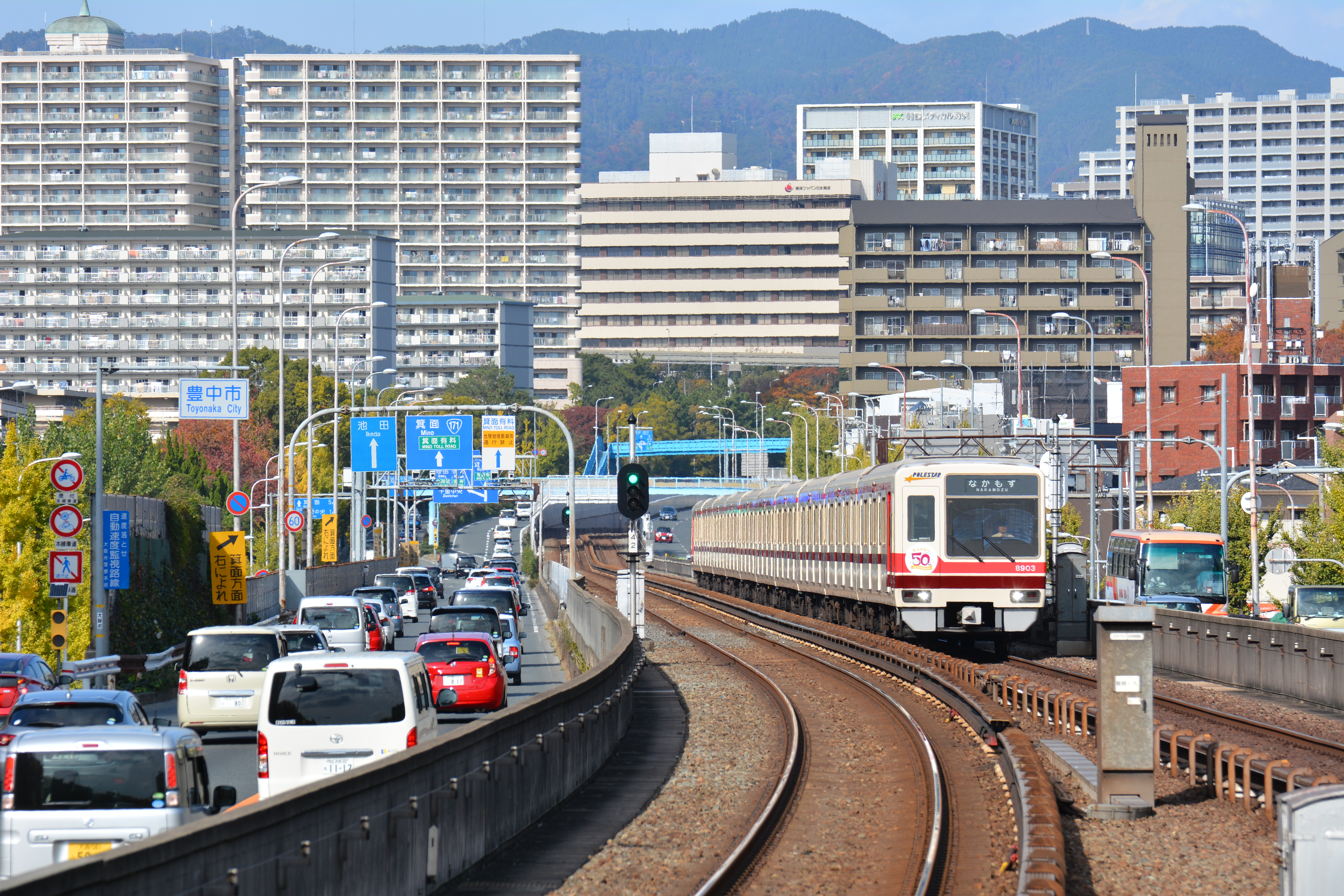
Shin-Midosuji

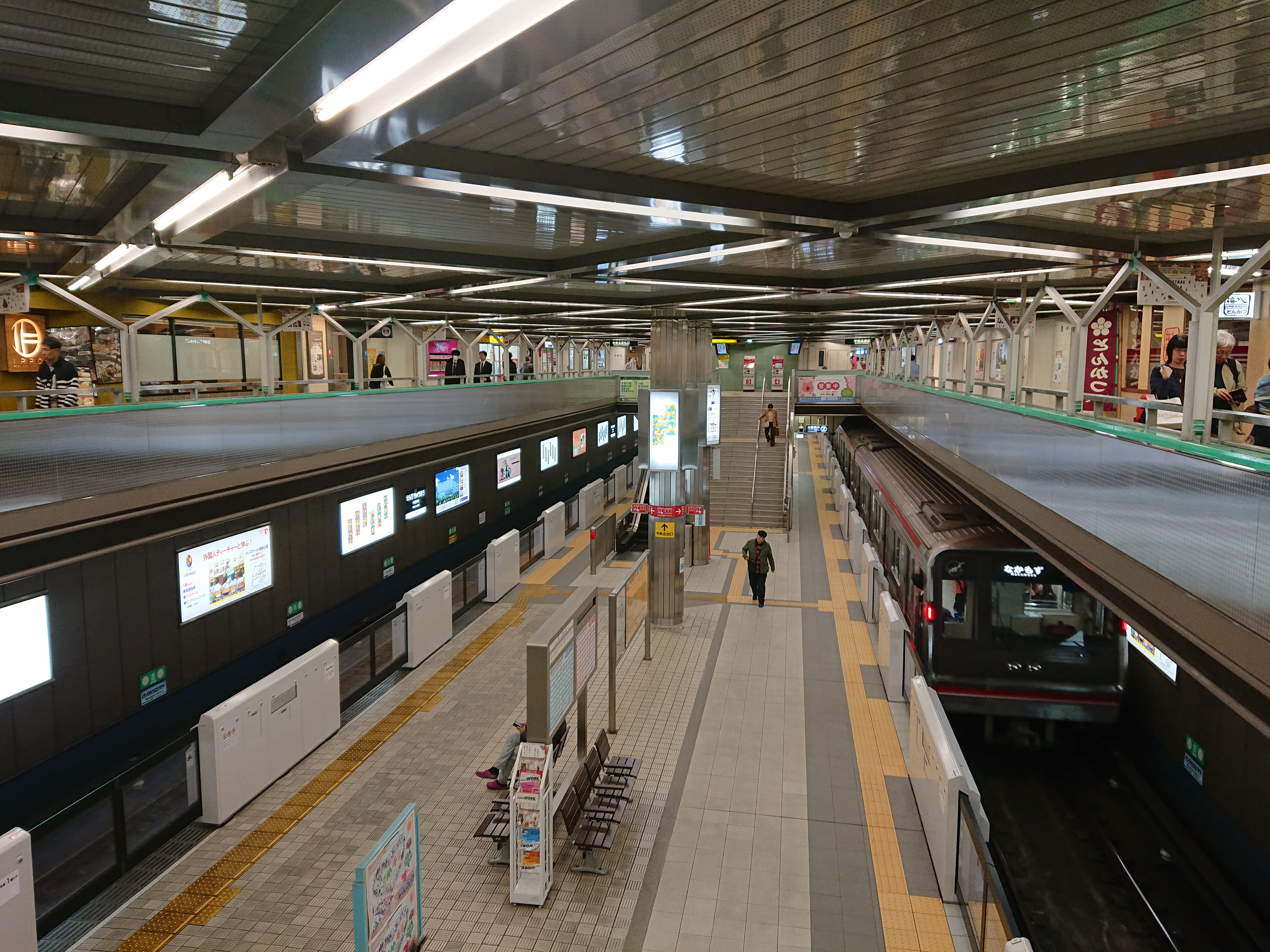
Senri-Chuo Station (Kita-Osaka Kyuko)

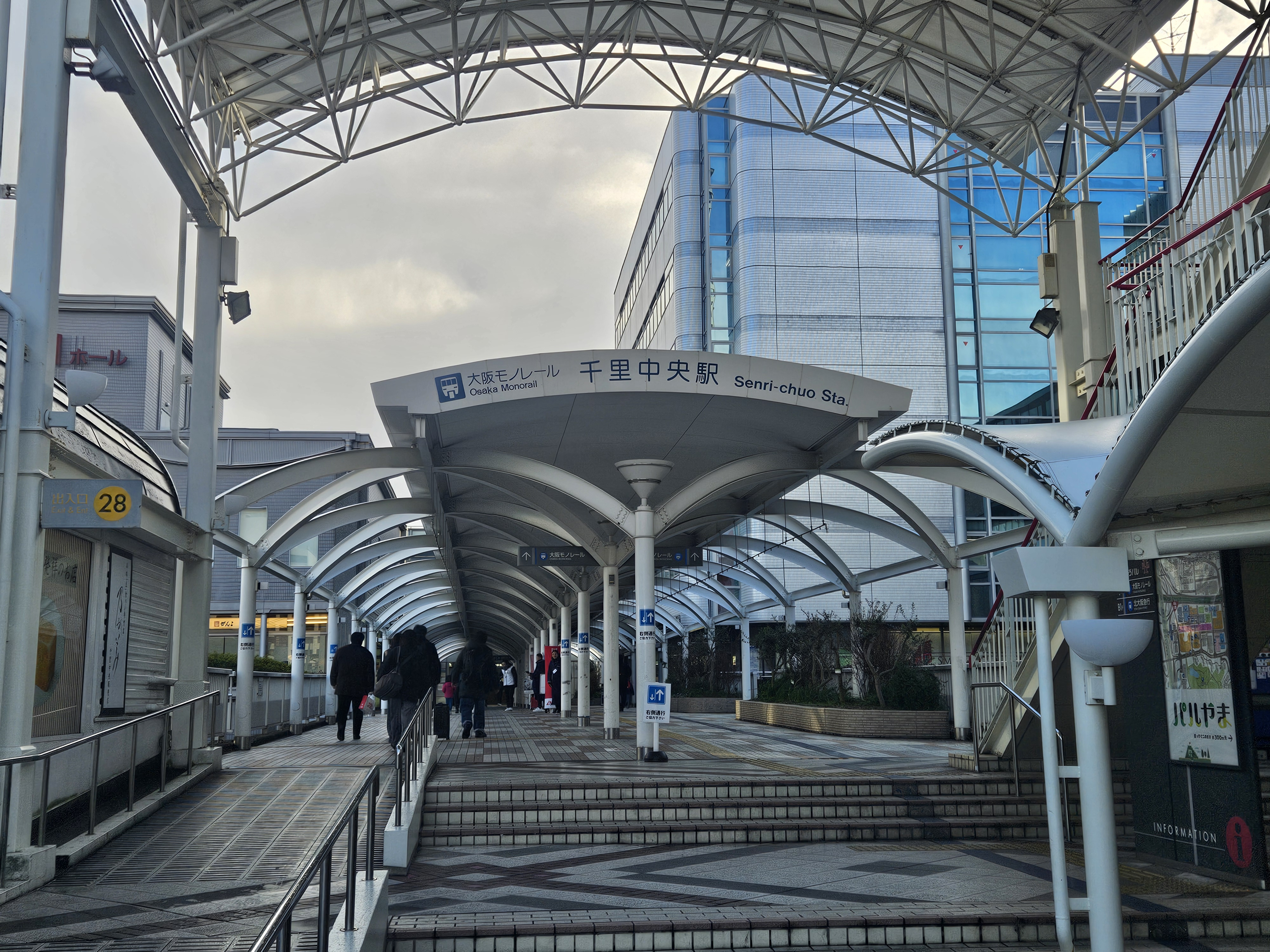
Senri-Chuo Station (Osaka Monorail)

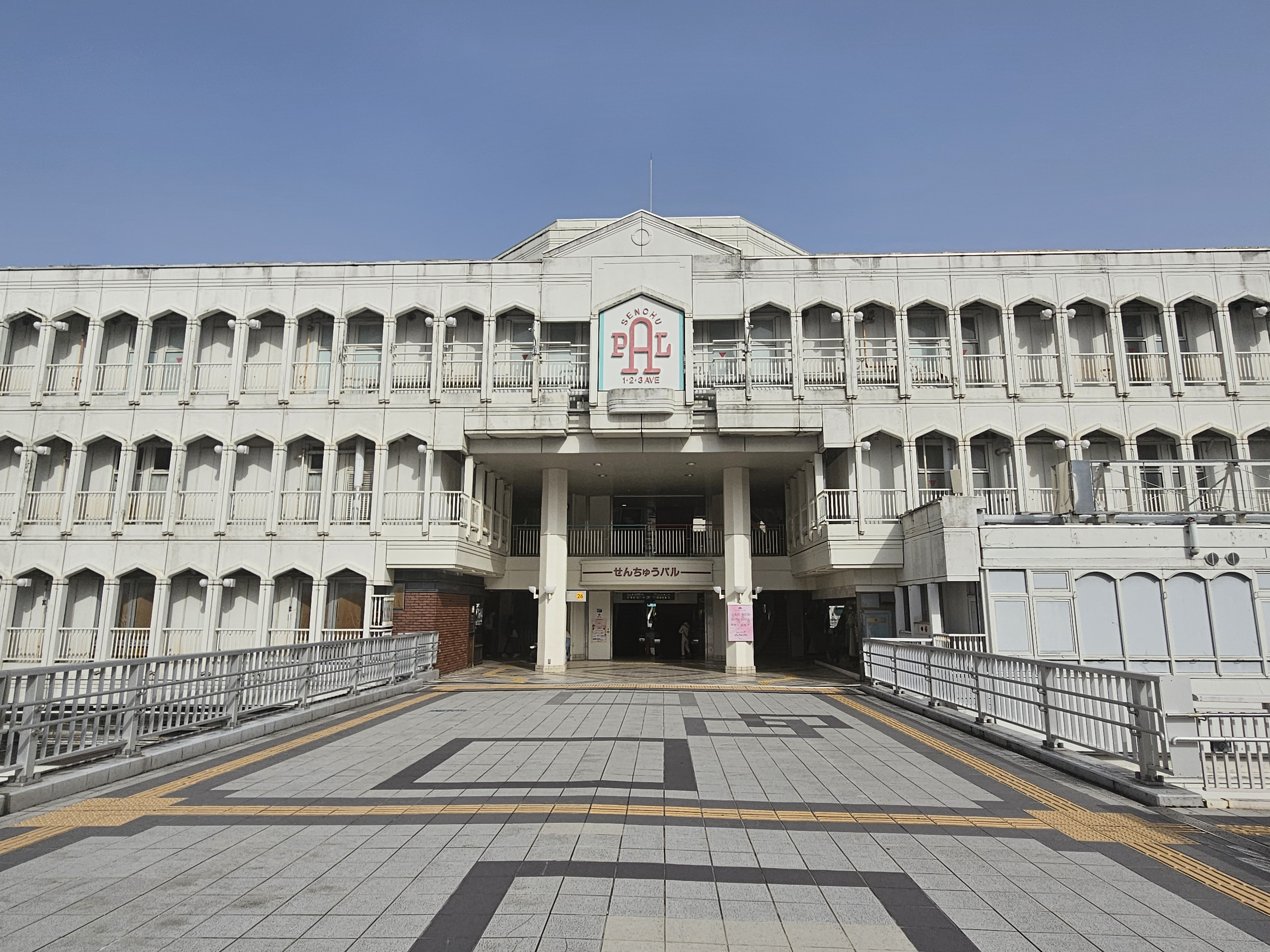
Senchu PAL

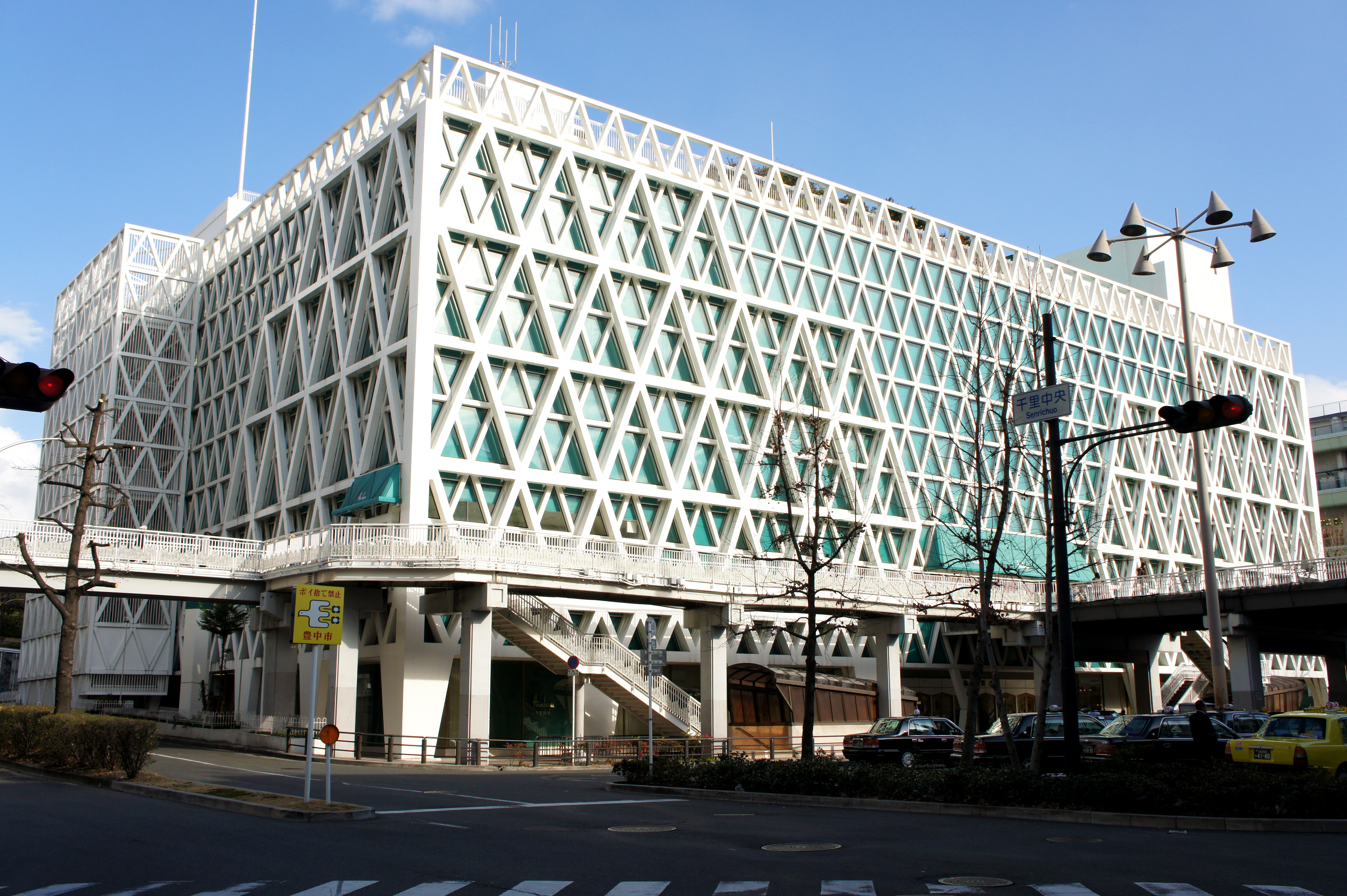
Senri Hankyu

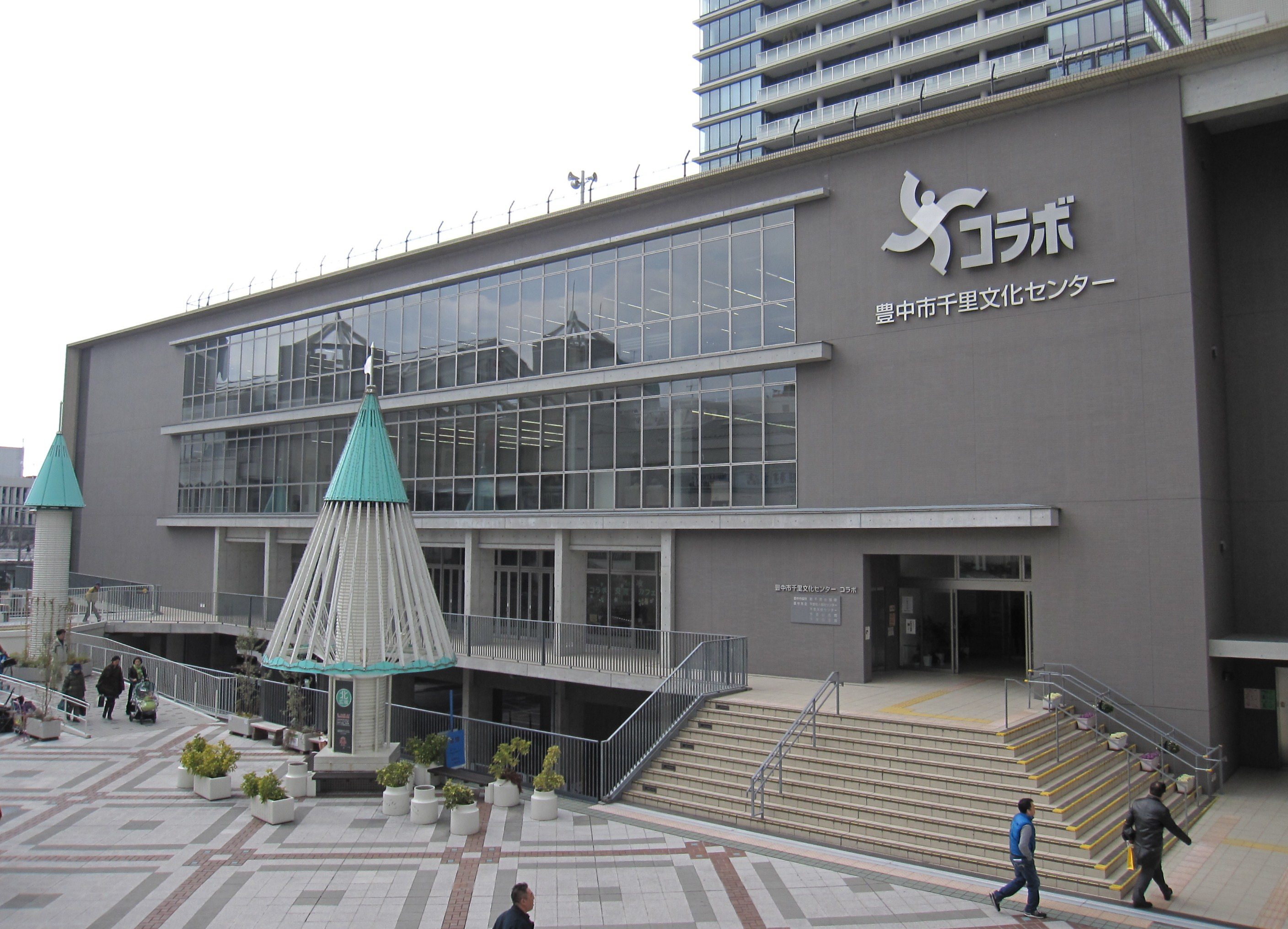
Senri Bunka Center

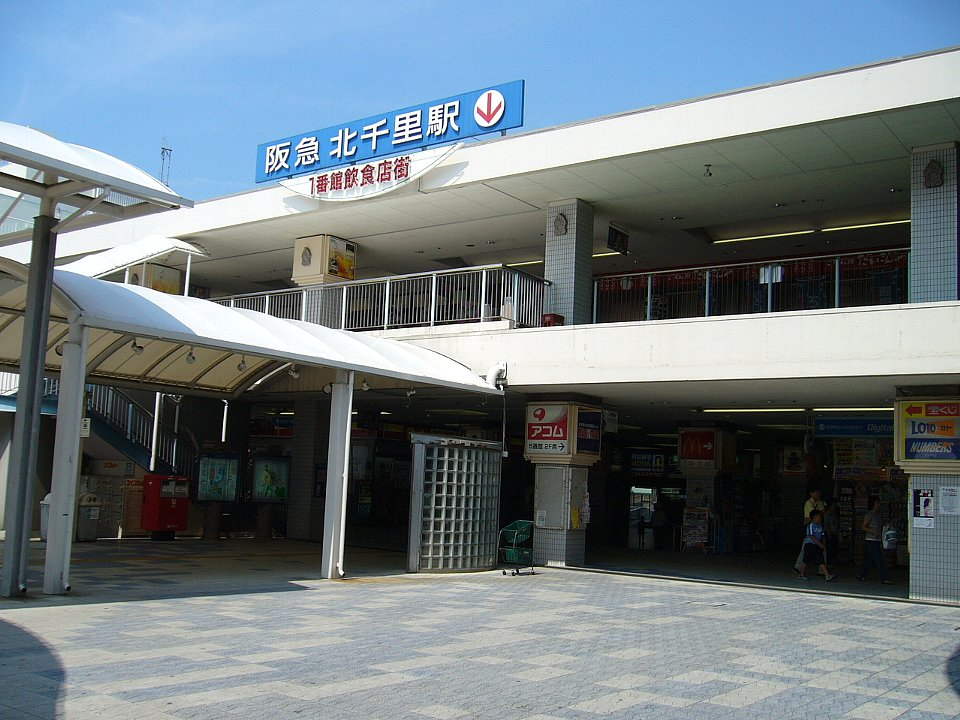
Kita-Senri Station

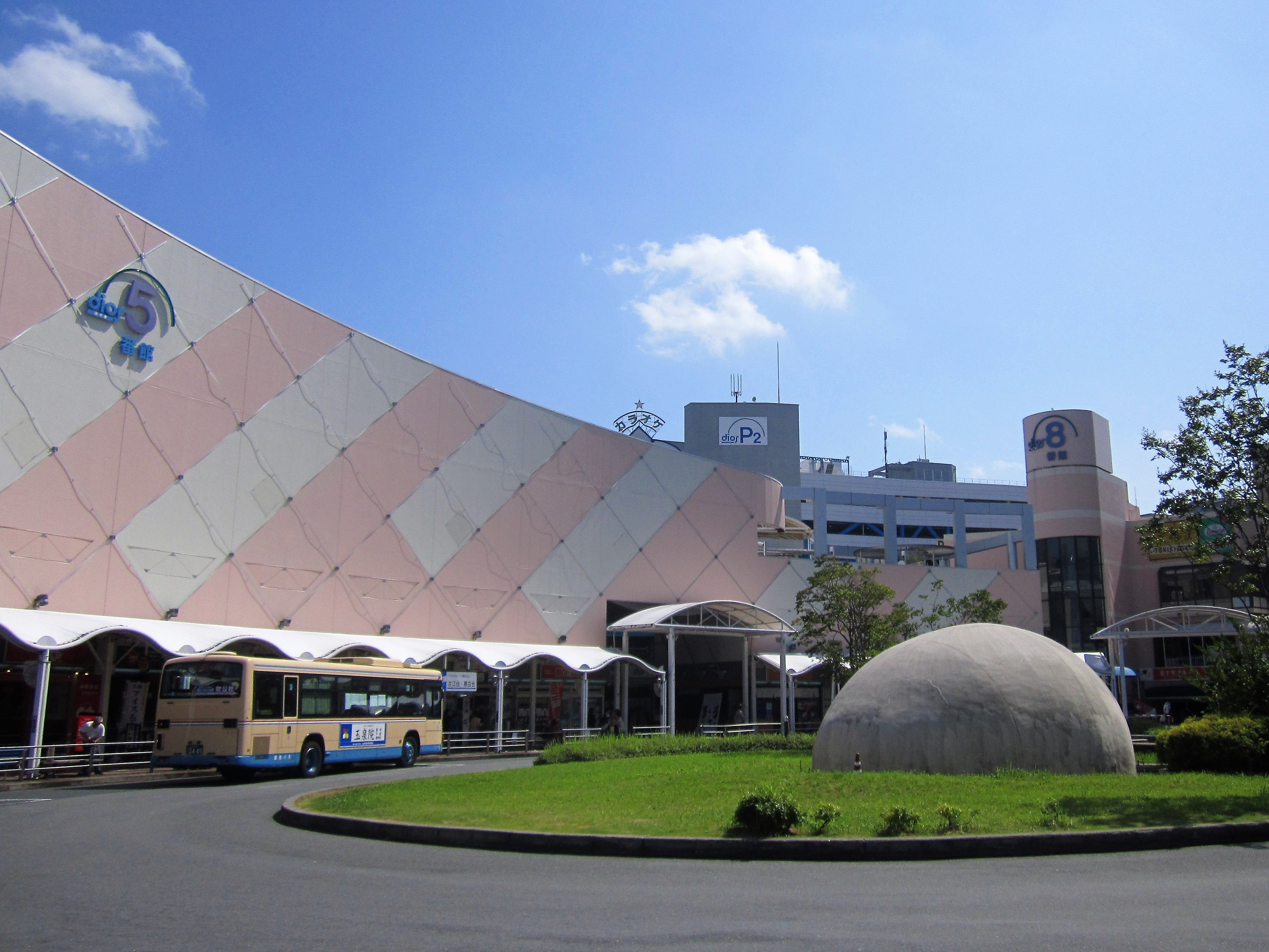
dios Kita-Senri

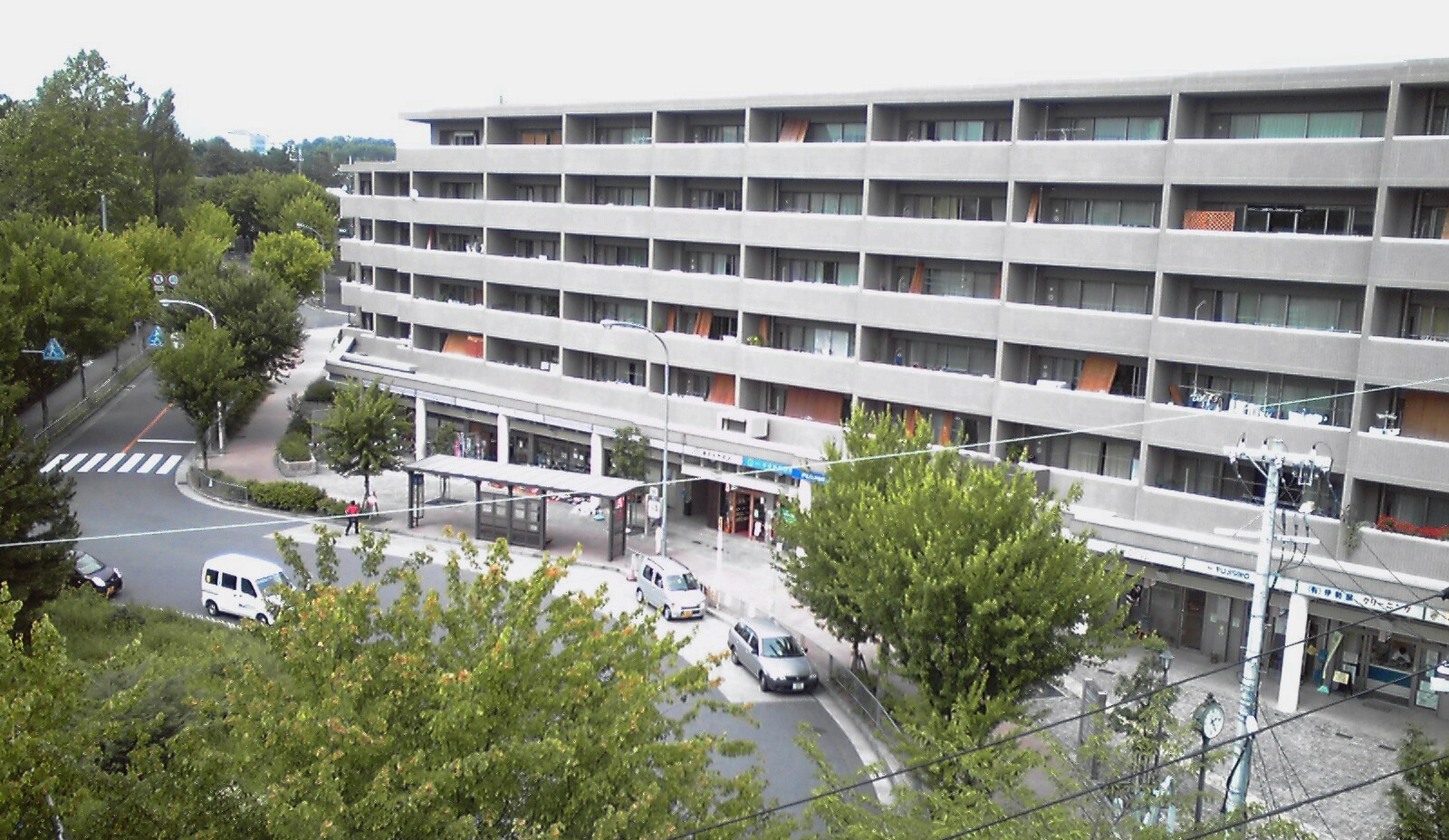
Fujishirodai 1-chome Rotary

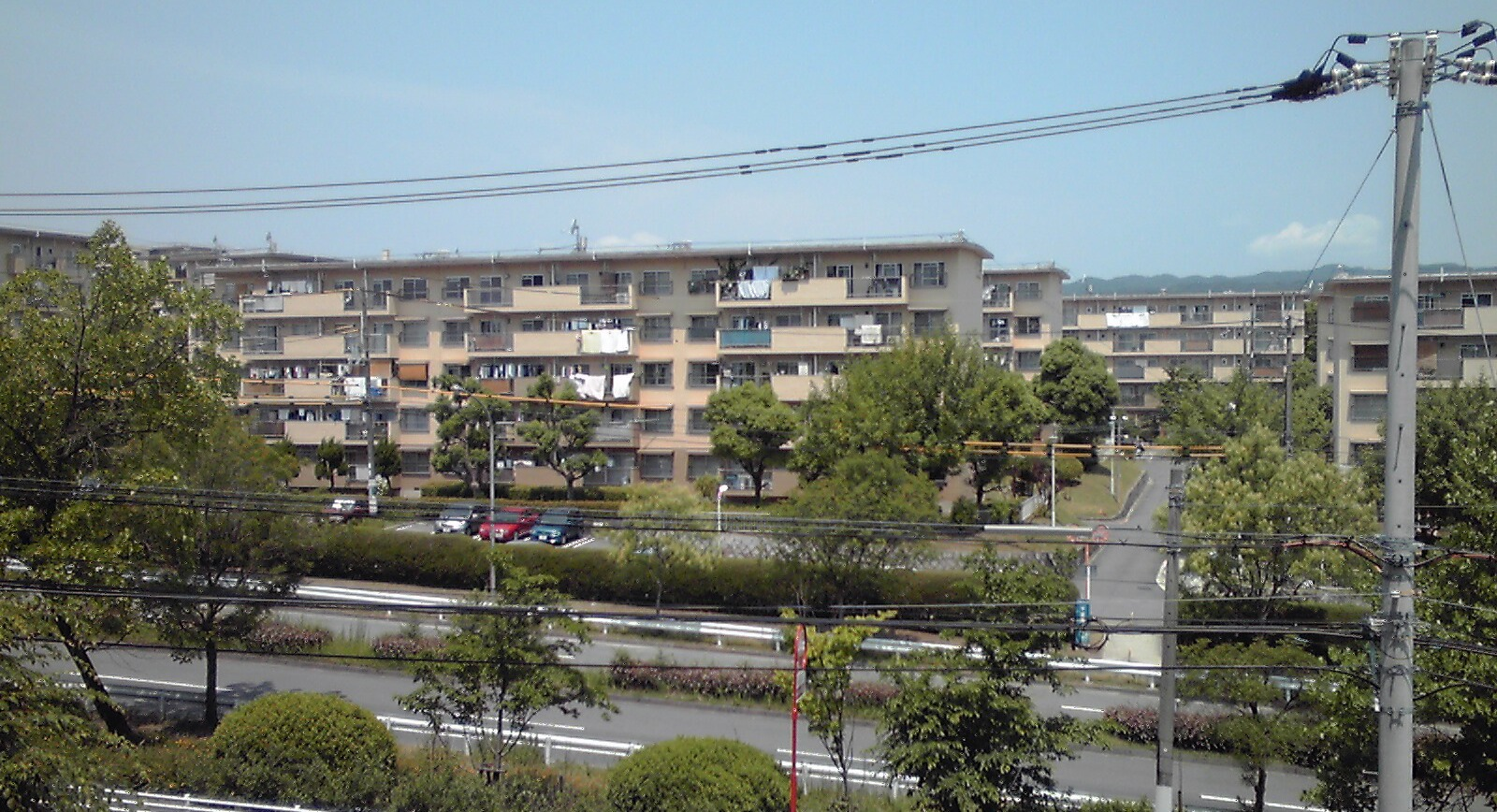
Aoyamadai 1-chome Apartments
