= Senri =

Senri may refer to:

== People ==
- Manaka Senri (born 1979), Japanese pop singer
- Senri Kawaguchi (born 1997), Japanese drummer
- Senri Oe (born 1960), Japanese musician

== Transportation ==
- Hankyu Senri Line, a railway line in Osaka, Japan
- Kita-Senri Station, a railway station in Suita, Osaka, Japan
- Minami-Senri Station, a railway station in Suita, Osaka, Japan
- Senri-Chūō Station, a railway station in Suita, Osaka, Japan

== Other uses ==
- Senri Kinran University, a private university in Suita, Osaka, Japan

== See also ==
- 千里 (disambiguation)
