= Shimo-Shinjō Station =

Railway station in Osaka, Japan

Coordinates: 34.7465°N 135.5198°E

Shimo-Shinjō Station 下新庄駅
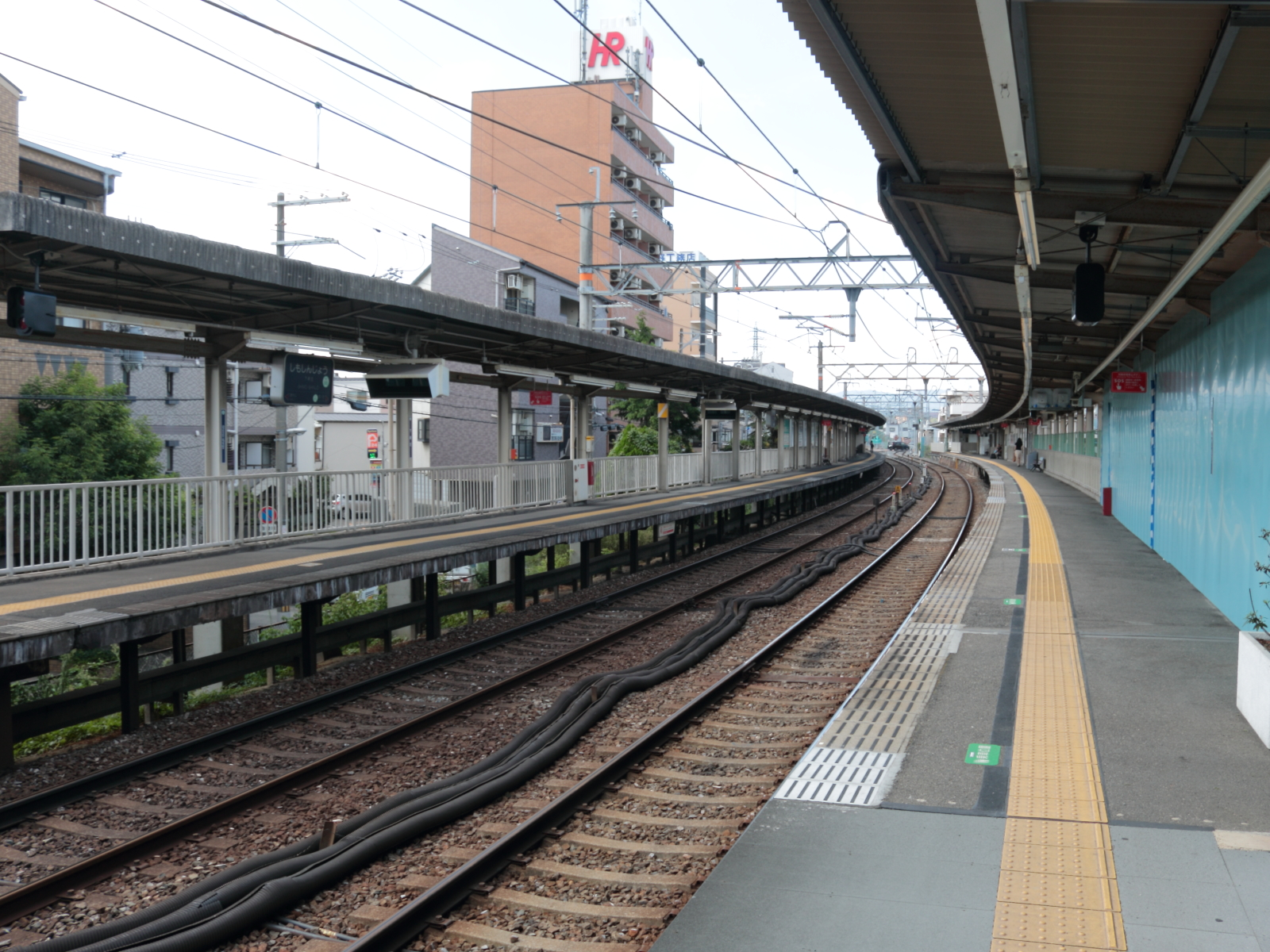

General information
- Location: Higashiyodogawa-ku, Osaka; Japan
- Operated by: Hankyu Railway
- Line(s): Senri Line

Services
Preceding station	Hankyu Railway	Following station
Awaji towards Tenjimbashisuji Rokuchōme	Senri Line Local	Suita towards Kita-Senri

Shimo-Shinjō Station (下新庄駅, Shimoshinjō Eki) is a station located in Higashiyodogawa-ku, Osaka, Japan.

== Lines ==
- Hankyu Senri Line

== Future plans ==
Construction is underway for grade separation. Work is being done as of 2019 to elevate a 3.3 km (2.1 mi) section of the Kyoto Line between this station and Kami-Shinjō Station. Originally planned to be opened by 2020, various delays have resulted in the opening being pushed to 2031.
