= Senriyama Station =

Railway station in Suita, Osaka Prefecture, Japan

Coordinates: 34.7784°N 135.5059°E

Senriyama Station 千里山駅
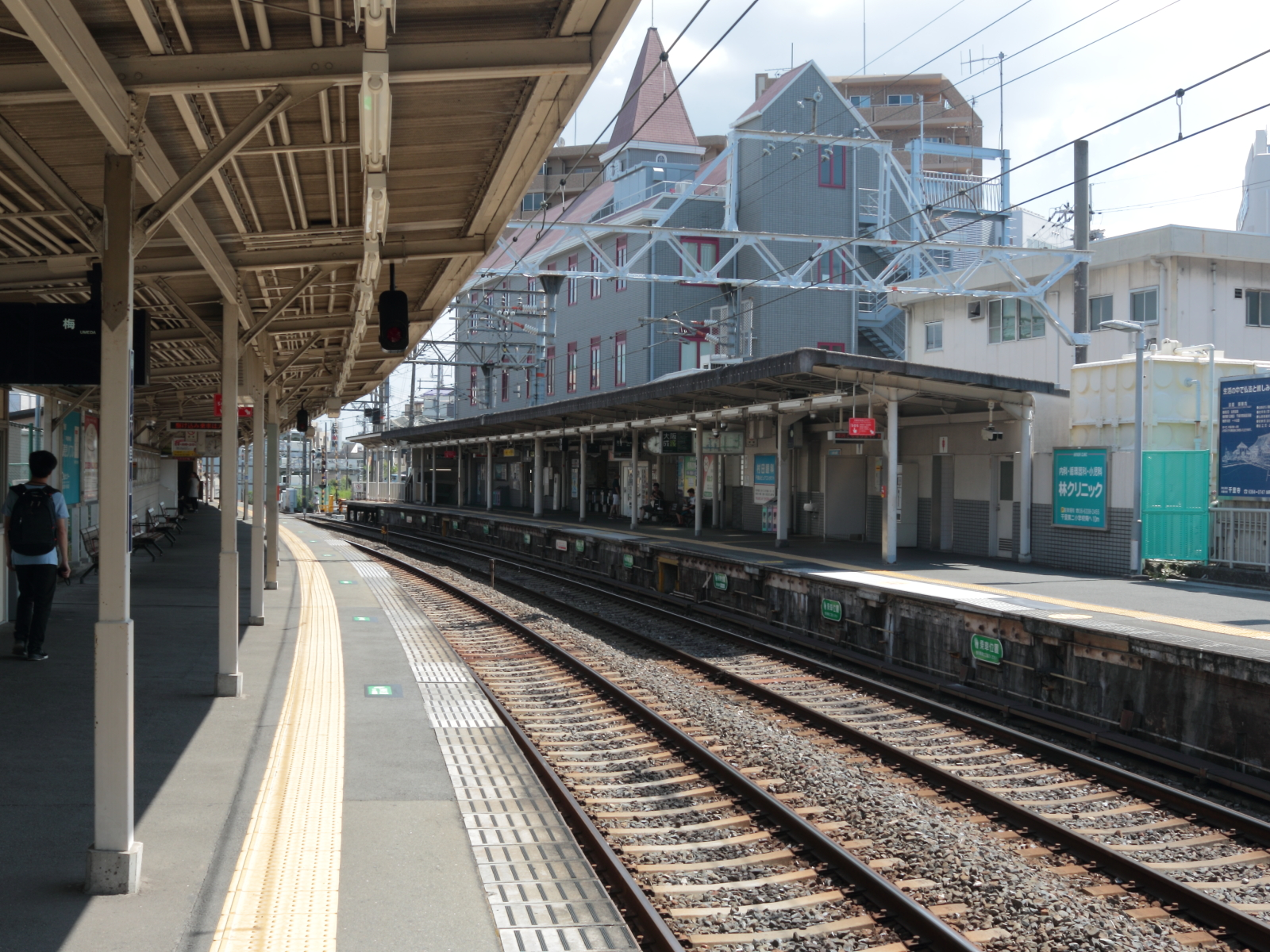
- The station platforms in August 2016

General information
- Location: 5 Senriyama-nishi, Suita-shi, Osaka-fu; Japan
- Operator: Hankyu
- Line: ■ Hankyu Senri Line
- Platforms: 2 side platforms
- Tracks: 2

Other information
- Station code: HK-92
- Website: Official website

History
- Opened: 26 October 1921

Services
| Preceding station | Hankyu Railway | Following station |
|---|---|---|
| Kandai-mae towards Tenjimbashisuji Rokuchōme | Senri Line Local | Minami-Senri towards Kita-Senri |
Location
- Location within Japan

Senriyama Station (千里山駅, Senriyama-eki) is a station on the Hankyu Senri Line in Suita, Osaka Prefecture, Japan, operated by the private railway operator Hankyu.

== Lines ==
Senriyama Station is served by the 13.6 km Hankyu Senri Line.

== History ==
The station opened on 26 October 1921.

== See also ==
- List of railway stations in Japan
