= Kandai-mae Station =

Railway station in Suita, Osaka Prefecture, Japan

Kandai-mae Station 関大前駅
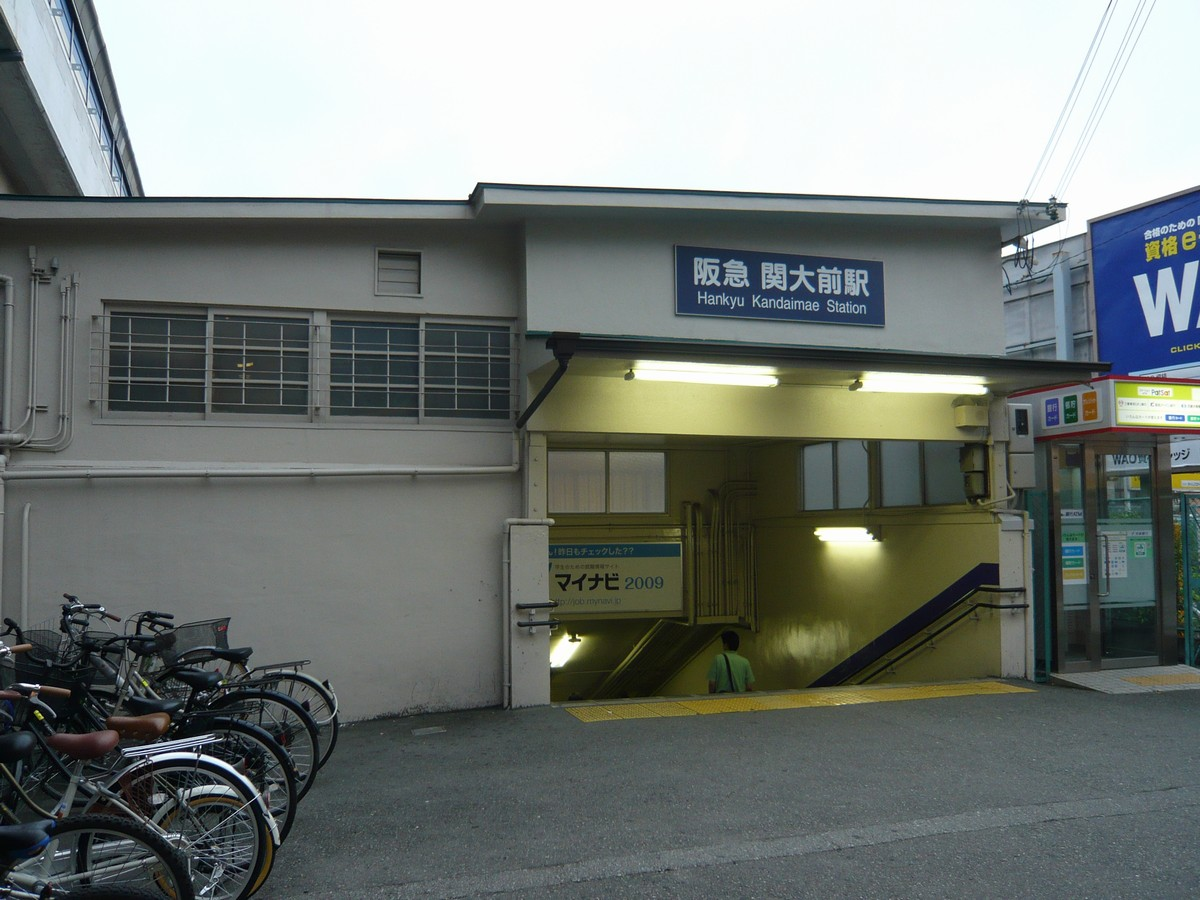

General information
- Location: 1, Senriyama-higashi, Suita, Osaka （大阪府吹田市千里山東1） Japan
- Coordinates: 34°46′16″N 135°30′21″E
- Operator: Hankyu Railway
- Line: Senri Line
- Connections

Other information
- Website: https://www.hankyu.co.jp/en/station/kandaimae.html

History
- Opened: April 10, 1964

Services
Preceding station	Hankyu Railway	Following station
Toyotsu towards Tenjimbashisuji Rokuchōme	Senri Line Local	Senriyama towards Kita-Senri
Location

Kandai-mae Station (関大前駅, Kandai-mae-eki) is a train station on the Hankyu Railway Senri Line located in Suita, Osaka Prefecture, Japan.

== Layout ==
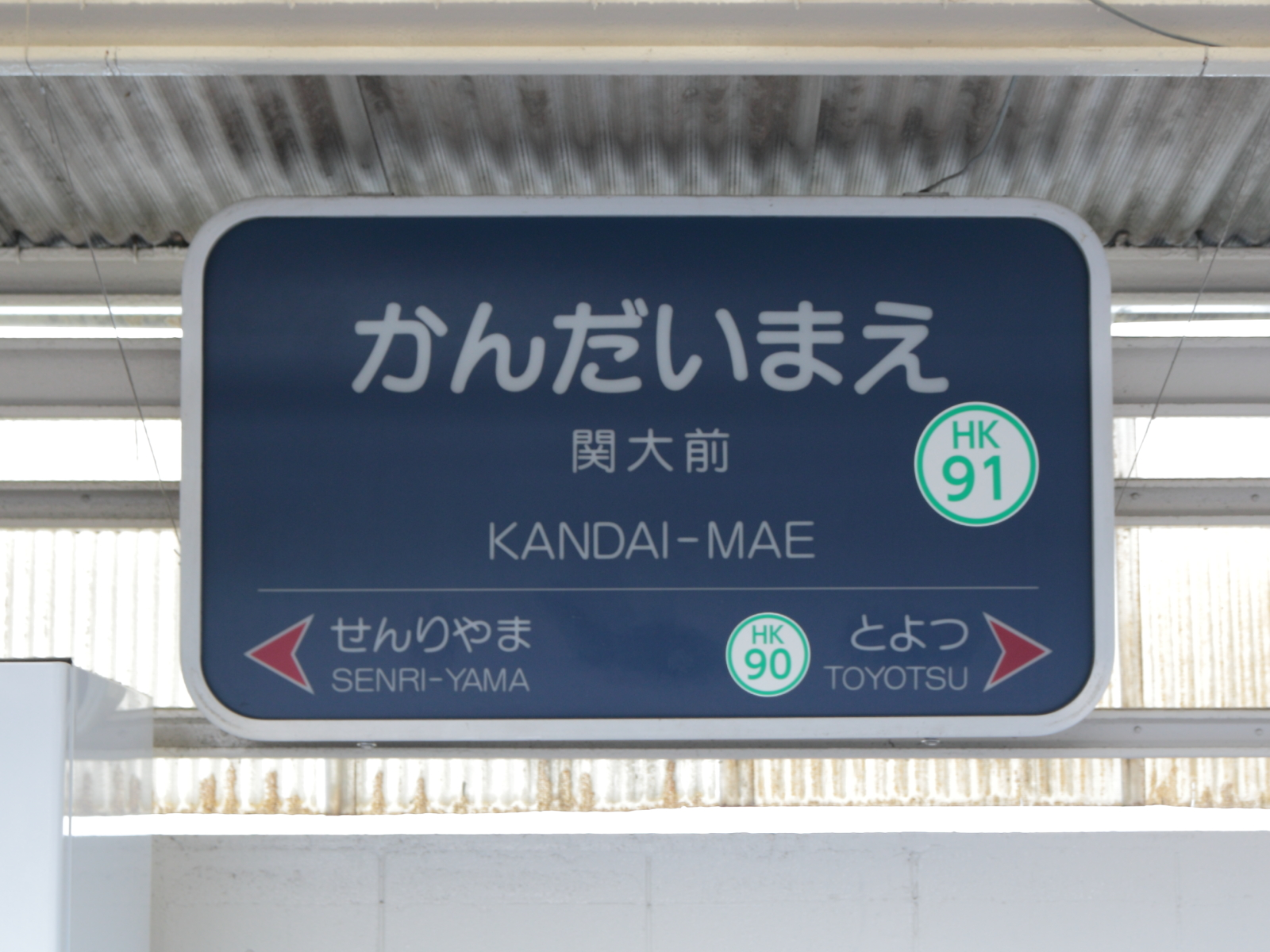
A station board

- There are two side platforms with two tracks on the ground level.

West Side	■ Senri Line	for Kita-Senri
East Side	■ Senri Line	for Umeda, Tenjimbashisuji Rokuchome, Tengachaya, Kyoto, Kobe and Takarazuka

== History ==
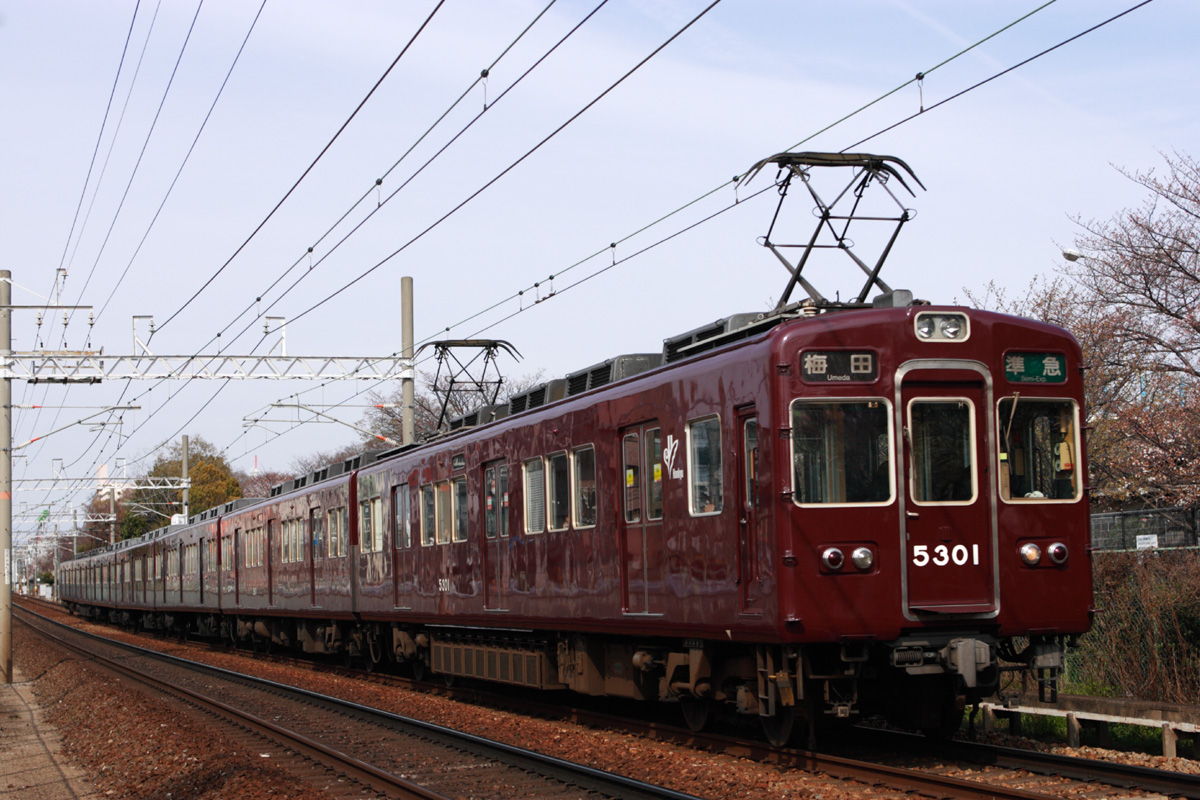
Hankyu Railway

- October 26, 1921 – Kadan-mae Station (花壇前駅) on Kita-Osaka Railway was opened.
- April 17, 1922 – Daigaku-mae Station (大学前駅) was opened between the Kadan-mae Station and the Senriyama Station.
- April 1, 1923 – Kadan-mae Station and Daigaku-mae Station became stations on Shin-Keihan Railway.
- September 15, 1930 – Kadan-mae Station and Daigaku-mae Station became new stations on the Keihan Railway (old) Senriyama Line.
- September 15, 1938 – Kadan-mae Station was renamed Senriyama-yūen Station (千里山遊園駅).
- October 1, 1943 – Hanshin Kyuko Railway Company consolidated Keihan Railway Company (old) and was renamed Keihanshin Kyuko Railway Company, thus Kadan-mae Station and Daigaku-mae Station became stations on the Keihanshin Kyuko Railway Senriyama Line.
- December 1, 1943 – Senriyama-yūen Station was renamed Senriyama-kōseien Station (千里山厚生園駅).
- April 7, 1946 – Senriyama-kōseien Station was renamed Senriyama-yūen Station (千里山遊園駅) again.
- August 1, 1950 – Senriyama-yūen Station was renamed Jogakuin-mae Station (女学院前駅).
- April 1, 1951 – Jogakuin-mae Station was renamed to Kadanchō Station (花壇町駅).
- April 10, 1964 – Kadanchō Station and Daigaku-mae Station were united and Kandai-mae Station (関大前駅) was opened.
- March 1, 1967 – The Senriyama Line was renamed the Senri Line.

== Surrounding ==
- Kansai University, at the Senriyama Campus
