= Suita Station (Hankyu) =

Railway station in Suita, Osaka Prefecture, Japan

Coordinates: 34°45′37″N 135°31′00″E

Suita Station 吹田駅
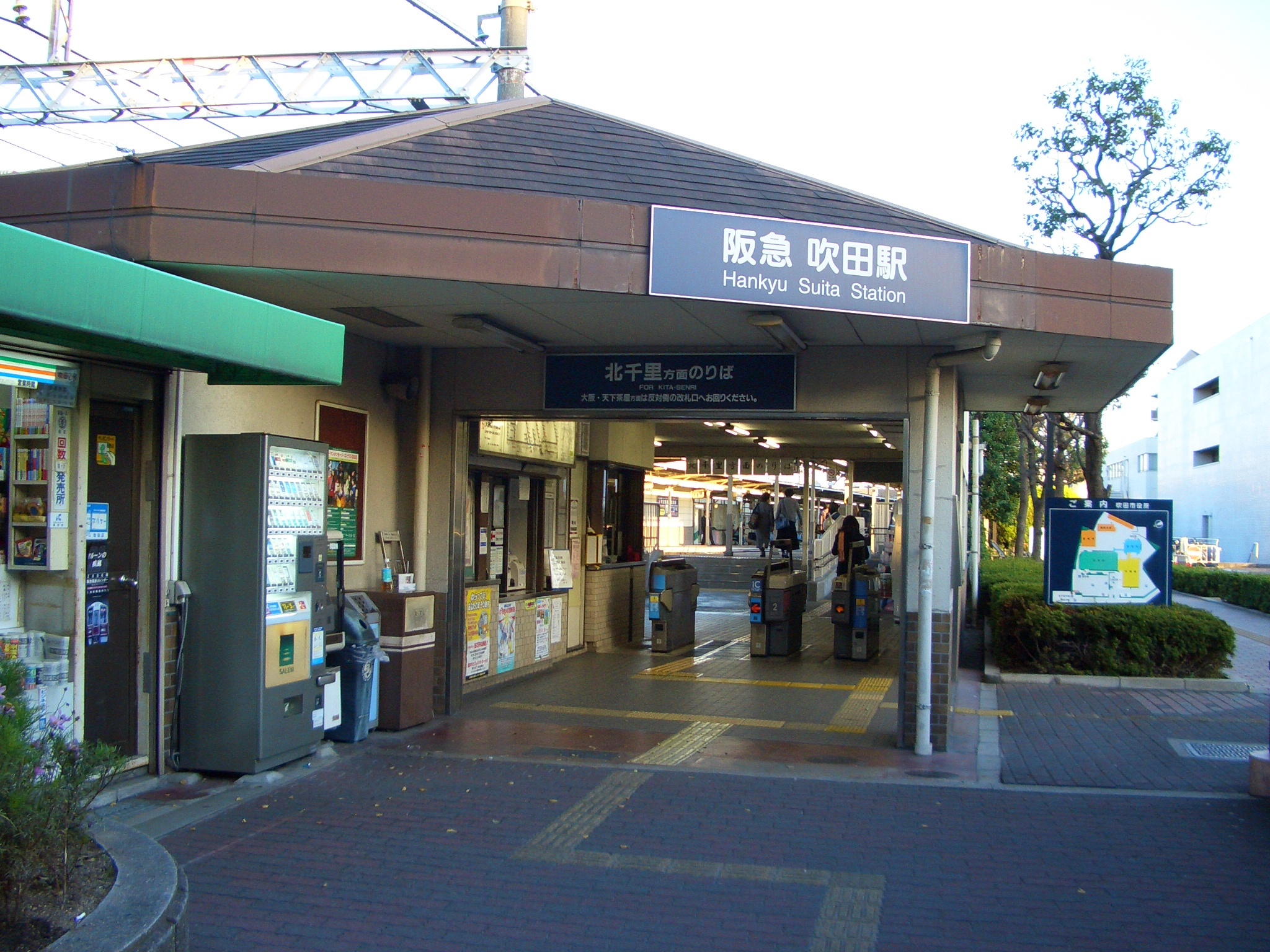

General information
- Location: Suita, Osaka; Japan
- Operator: Hankyu
- Line: Hankyu Senri Line

Other information
- Station code: HK89

History
- Opened: April 10, 1964

Services
Preceding station	Hankyu Railway	Following station
Shimo-Shinjō towards Tenjimbashisuji Rokuchōme	Senri Line Local	Toyotsu towards Kita-Senri
Location

Suita Station (吹田駅, Suita-eki) is a station located in Suita, Osaka Prefecture, Japan.

== Lines ==
- Hankyu Senri Line

== History ==
When the line opened in 1921 the stations were called Nishi-Suita Station and Higashi-Suita Station. In 1943 they were renamed Shiyakushomae Station and Suita Station respectively. When the stations of the line were realigned on April 10, 1964, both stations were discontinued and the new Suita Station was built, reusing and expanding the facilities of former Shiyakushomae Station.
