= Suita Station =

Suita Station (吹田駅) is the name of two train stations in Suita, Osaka, Japan:

- Suita Station (JR West)
- Suita Station (Hankyu)
