= Chisato =

- Gender: Female

Origin
- Origin: Japanese
- Meaning: different meanings depending on the kanji used

Chisato (ちさと, チサト) is a feminine Japanese given name.

== Written forms ==
Chisato can be written using different kanji characters and can mean:

- 千里, "great distance"
- 知里, "knowledge, hometown"
- 智里, "wisdom, hometown"
- 千聖, "thousand, holy"
- 千郷, "thousand, hometown"

The name can also be written in hiragana or katakana.

== People with the name ==
- Chisato Amate (天手 千聖; born 1980), Japanese actress
- Chisato Doihata (土井畑 知里; born 1994), Japanese trampoline gymnast
- Chisato Fukushima (福島 千里; born 1988), Japanese sprinter
- Chisato Hoshi (星 千智; born 1995), Japanese badminton player
- Chisato Ichinose (市瀬 千里; born 1999), Japanese professional footballer
- Chisato Minamimura, British dancer and choreographer
- Chisato Mishima (三島 千里; born 1967), Japanese professional fitness competitor
- Chisato Morishita (森下 千里; born 1981), Japanese gravure idol, tarento, actress
- Chisato Moritaka (森高 千里; born 1969), Japanese singer-songwriter
- Chisato Nakajima (中島 千里), Japanese voice actress
- Chisato Nagaoka (長岡 千里; born 1976), Japanese bobsledder
- Ōe no Chisato (大江千里), Japanese waka poet and Confucian scholar
- Chisato Okai (岡井 千聖; born 1994), Japanese singer, member of the girl group Cute
- Chisato Saito (齊藤 千聖; born 1988), Japanese long-distance runner
- Chisato Shiina (椎名 千里; born 1982), Japanese figure skater
- Chisato Tanaka (田中 千智; born 1988), Japanese retired track and field sprinter
- Tsumori Chisato (津森 千里; born 1954), Japanese fashion designer
- Chisato Yokoo (横尾 千里; born 1992), Japanese rugby sevens player
- Chisato (musician) (千聖; born 1971), a guitarist of the Japanese band Penicillin

== Fictional characters ==
- Chisato, a minor character in the computer role-playing game Suikoden V
- Chisato, a character in the anime series Vampire Princess Miyu
- Chisato Arashi, a character in the media franchise Love Live! Superstar!!
- Chisato Jōgasaki, a character in the Tokusatsu series Denji Sentai Megaranger
- Chisato Madison, a character in the role-playing video game Star Ocean: The Second Story
- Chisato Matsui, a character in the novel and film Battle Royale
- Chisato Mera, a character in the manga series The Disastrous Life of Saiki K.
- Chisato Nishikigi, a character in the anime series Lycoris Recoil
- Chisato Shirasagi, a character in the media franchise BanG Dream!

== See also ==
- Chisato Station (Mie), a train station in Tsu, Mie Prefecture, Japan
- Chisato Station (Toyama), a train station in Toyama, Toyama Prefecture, Japan
