= Toyotsu Station =

Toyotsu Station (豊津駅) is the name of two train stations in Japan:

- Toyotsu Station (Fukuoka)
- Toyotsu Station (Osaka)
