= Toyotsu Station (Osaka) =

Railway station in Suita, Osaka Prefecture, Japan

Coordinates: 34°45′51″N 135°30′34″E

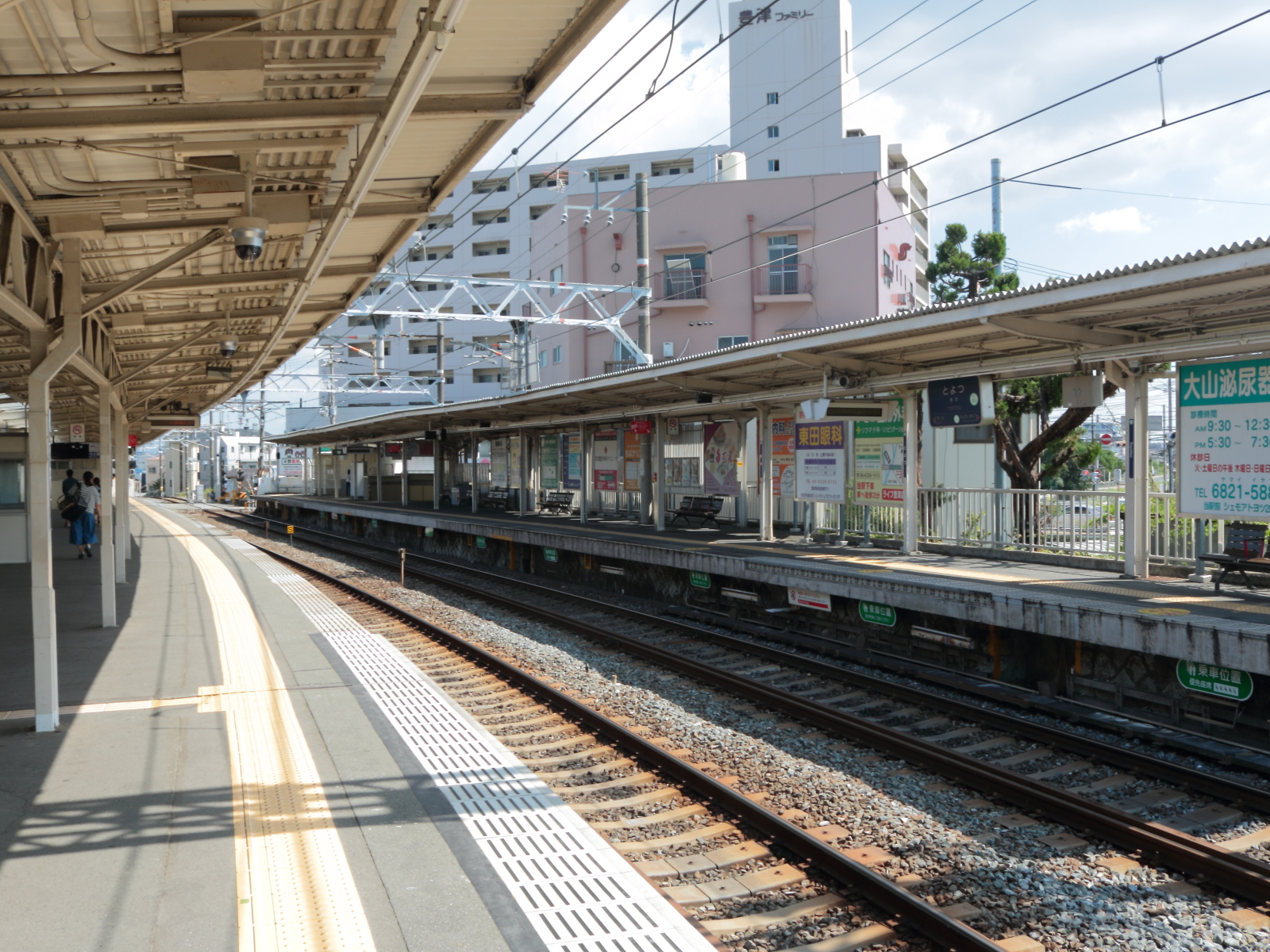
The platforms at the Hankyu Toyotsu Station in Osaka

Toyotsu Station (豊津駅, Toyotsu-eki) is a station located in Suita, Osaka Prefecture, Japan.

== Lines ==
- Hankyu Senri Line

== Layout ==
- There are 2 side platforms and 2 tracks on the ground level.

■ Senri Line	for Kita-Senri
■ Senri Line	for Umeda, Tenjimbashisuji Rokuchome, Tengachaya, Kyoto, Kobe and Takarazuka

== Adjacent stations ==
Preceding station	Hankyu Railway	Following station
Suita towards Tenjimbashisuji Rokuchōme	Senri Line Local	Kandai-mae towards Kita-Senri
