= Hankyu Senri Line =

Railway line in Osaka, Japan

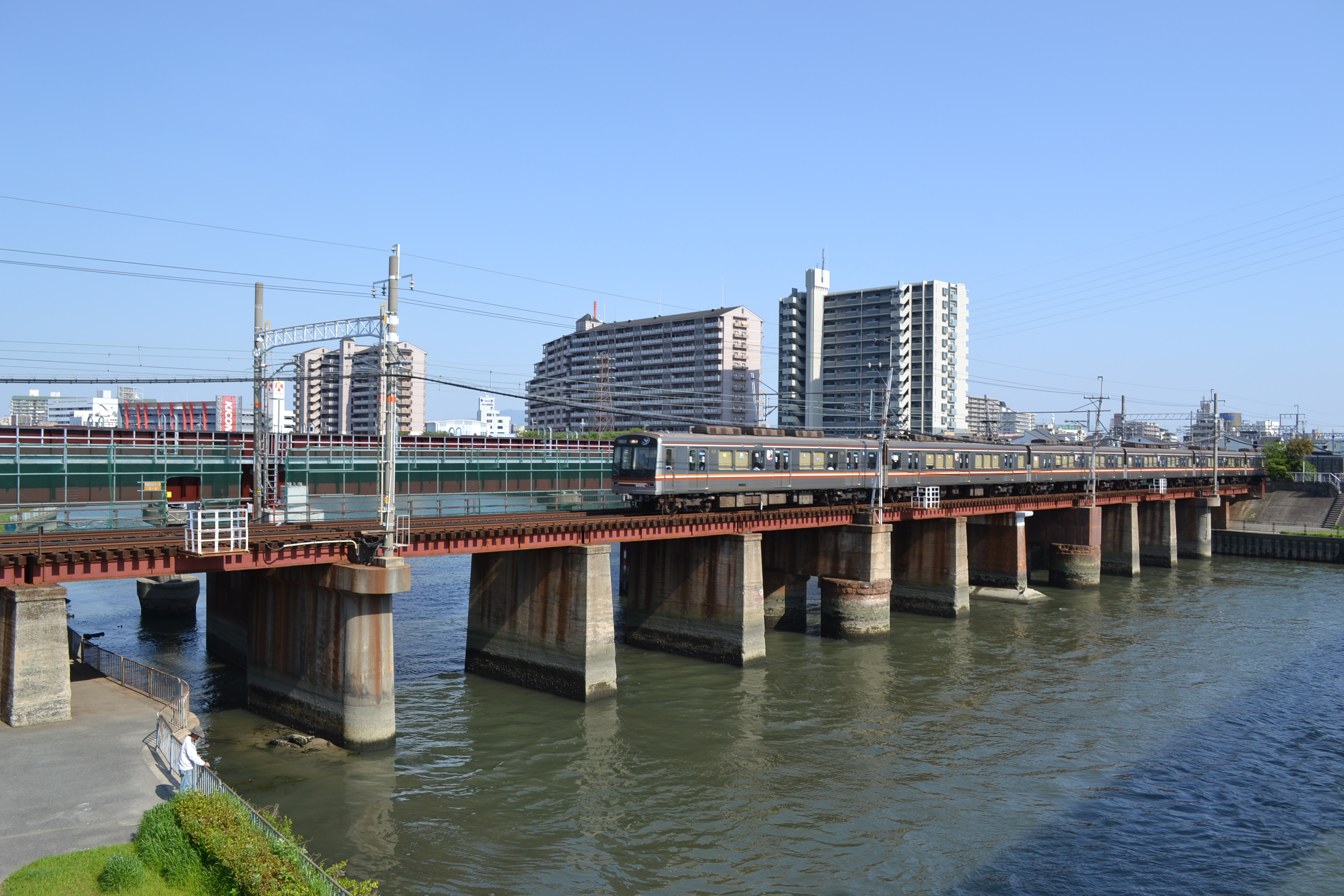
- Senri Line train crossing the Kanzaki River (between Shimo-Shinjō Station and Suita Station), April 2013

Overview
- Locale: Kansai
- Termini: Tenjinbashisuji Rokuchōme; Kita-senri
- Stations: 11

Service
- Operator(s): Hankyu Railway
- Depot(s): Shojaku

History
- Opened: 1 April 1921; 104 years ago

Technical
- Line length: 13.6 km (8.5 mi)
- Track gauge: 1,435 mm (4 ft 8 1/2 in)
- Electrification: 1,500 V DC, overhead line
- Operating speed: 80 km/h (50 mph)
Route map

The Hankyu Senri Line (阪急千里線, Hankyū Senri-sen) is a railway line in Osaka Prefecture, Japan, operated by Hankyu Railway. It commenced operation in 1921 and was completed on March 1, 1967. Through trains operate to and from the Hankyu Kyoto Line and the Osaka Municipal Subway Sakaisuji Line.

== History ==
The Kita-Osaka Electric Railway opened the Awaji - Senriyama section (1435 mm gauge, dual track) electrified at 600 VDC in 1921.

The Senri line was nicknamed the "Graveyard Train" as the northern terminus around Senriyama was once the site of numerous graveyards.

In 1923, the Shin-Keihan Railway assumed management of the railway. The Awaji-Tenjimbashi (Tenjimbashisuji Rokuchme) segment opened in 1925 (1435 mm gauge, twin track), electrified at 600 VDC, then extended to 1500 VDC in 1928. With the terminal at Tenjimbashi, this section was a part of the main line of the Shin-Keihan Railway (later the Shin-Keihan Line of the Keihan Electric Railway) connecting Kyoto and Osaka.

The Senriyama - Shin-Senriyama (now Minami-Senri) section opened in 1963, and was extended to Kita-Senri in 1967 (both dual track and electrified). These extensions were to serve the newly developed Senri New Town.

After the Shinkeihan lines were merged to Hankyu in 1943, the role of Tenjimbashi Station as the terminal was gradually shifted to Umeda, the terminal built by Hankyu, and ended in 1969 when the through-running from Tenjimbashisuji Rokuchōme (replacing the old terminal with a single underground platform) to the Osaka Subway Sakaisuji Line commenced. In 1970, the line was one of major access routes to Expo '70 with the temporary Expo West Gate Station.

Construction has been in progress since 2012 to elevate a 3.8 km (2.4 mi) section of track from Kunijima Station to Shimo-Shinjō Station including the junction with the Kyoto Line at Awaji Station. Originally projected for a 2020 completion, various delays have pushed back the start of operations on the new tracks to 2031.

As of 2013, all stations on the line are assigned station numbers.

The Senri line celebrated its 100th year of operation on 21 April 2021.

== Service types ==
In the timetable revised on December 21, 2013, regular trains are classified in three types:

- Local (普通, futsū)
- Sakaisuji Semi-Express (堺筋準急, sakaisuji junkyū)
- Limited Express "Hozu" (直通特急 ほづ, chokutsū tokkyū) - in spring and autumn

== Stations ==
No.	Station	Japanese	Distance (km)	Sakaisuji Semi-Express	Limited Express Hozu	Transfers	Location
Through service:				From Tenjimbashisuji Rokuchōme: Local / Sakaisuji Semi-Express trains to Osaka Metro Sakaisuji Line for Tengachaya From Awaji: Local trains to Hankyu Kyoto Main Line for Umeda			
K11	Tenjimbashisuji Rokuchōme	天神橋筋六丁目	0.0	●	●	Sakaisuji Line (through trains); Tanimachi Line	Kita-ku, Osaka
HK-87	Kunijima	柴島	2.2	|	|		Higashiyodogawa-ku, Osaka
HK-63	Awaji	淡路	3.5	●	●	Hankyu Kyoto Line (to Umeda); F Osaka Higashi Line (JR-F04:JR-Awaji)	Higashiyodogawa-ku, Osaka
HK-88	Shimo-Shinjō	下新庄	4.4				Higashiyodogawa-ku, Osaka
HK-89	Suita	吹田	6.0				Suita, Osaka
HK-90	Toyotsu	豊津	6.9				Suita, Osaka
HK-91	Kandai-mae	関大前	7.8				Suita, Osaka
HK-92	Senriyama	千里山	8.6				Suita, Osaka
HK-93	Minami-Senri	南千里	10.2				Suita, Osaka
HK-94	Yamada	山田	11.6			Osaka Monorail Main Line	Suita, Osaka
HK-95	Kita-Senri	北千里	13.6				Suita, Osaka
Through service:				From Awaji: Local / Sakaisuji Semi Express trains to Hankyu Kyoto Main Line for Kawaramachi; Limited Express Hozu to Hankyu Kyoto Main Line and Arashiyama Line for Arashiyama			

=== Abandoned stations ===
- Nagara (Tenjimbashisuji Rokuchome - Kunijima) - abandoned on February 1, 1944
- Suita (first) (Shimo-Shinjo - Shiyakusho-mae) - consolidated to Shiyakisho-mae Station on April 10, 1964 and Shiyakusho-mae Station was renamed Suita Station.
- Kadancho (Toyotsu - Daigaku-mae) - consolidated to Kandai-mae Station on April 10, 1964
- Daigaku-mae (Kadancho - Senriyama) - consolidated to Kandai-mae Station on April 10, 1964
- Expo West Gate (Minami-Senri - Kita-Senri) - used from November 10, 1969 until September 14, 1970
