= Yamada Station (Osaka) =

Railway and monorail station in Suita, Osaka Prefecture, Japan

Coordinates: 34°48′15.01″N 135°30′56.69″E

Yamada Station 山田駅
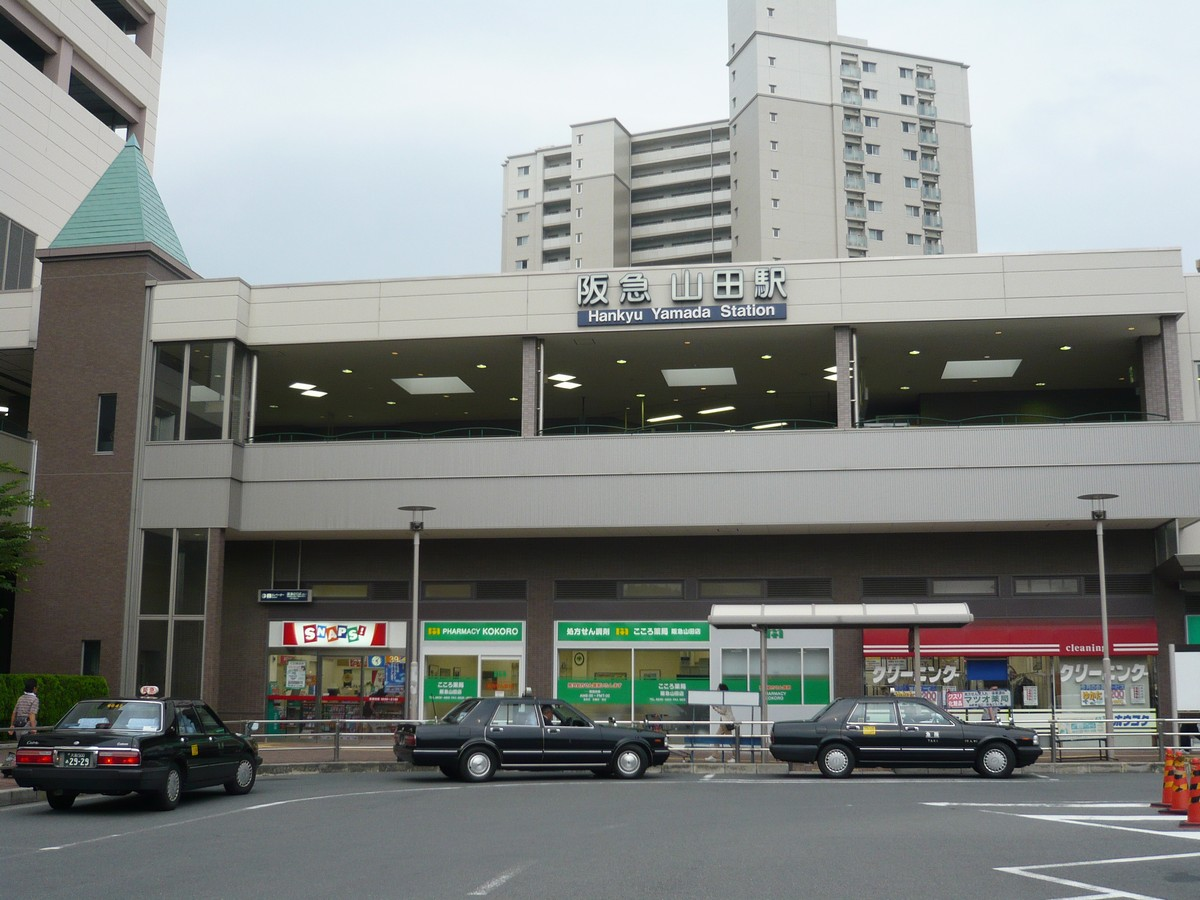
- East side of Hankyu Yamada Station, August 2007

General information
- Location: Suita, Osaka; Japan
- Operator: Hankyu; Osaka Monorail
- Lines: Hankyu Senri Line; Osaka Monorail Main Line

Other information
- Station code: HK94, 16

History
- Opened: November 23, 1973

Services
Preceding station	Hankyu Railway	Following station
Minami-Senri towards Tenjimbashisuji Rokuchōme	Senri Line Local	Kita-Senri Terminus
Location

Yamada Station (山田駅, Yamada-eki) is a train station on the Hankyu Senri Line and Osaka Monorail located in Suita, Osaka, Japan.

== Lines ==
- Hankyu Senri Line (Station Number: HK94)
- Osaka Monorail Main Line (Station Number: 16)

== Layout ==
The Hankyu and Osaka Monorail stations are 200 meters away.

=== Hankyu Senri Line ===
There are two side platforms and two tracks on the ground level. Each platform has its own ticket gate.

west side	■ Senri Line (northbound)	to Kita-Senri
east side	■ Senri Line (southbound)	for Umeda, Tenjimbashisuji Rokuchome, Tengachaya, Kyoto, Kobe and Takarazuka

=== Osaka Monorail Main Line ===
There are an island platform and two tracks elevated on the third floor. The ticket gate is on the second floor.

1	■ Osaka Monorail Main Line	for Bampaku-Kinen-Koen (Expo '70 Commemoration Park), Kadomashi and Saito-nishi
2	■ Osaka Monorail Main Line	for Senri-Chuo and Osaka Airport

== History ==
Yamada Station on the Hankyu Senri Line opened on November 23, 1973 between the existing Minami-Senri Station and Kita-Senri Station. Approximately 300 meters north of the Hankyu station was temporary Expo West Gate Station which served Expo '70 in 1970.

The Osaka Monorail station opened on 1 June 1990, coinciding with the opening of the first phase of the Osaka Monorail Line from Senri-Chūō Station to Minami-Ibaraki station.

== Adjacent stations ==
«	Service	»
Osaka Monorail Main Line (16)
Senri-Chūō (15)	-	Bampaku-kinen-kōen (17)
