= Chisato (musician) =

Japanese musician (born 1971)

Chisato 千聖
- Born: August 4, 1971 (age 54); Tokyo, Japan
- Genres: Rock
- Instrument: Guitars
- Years active: 1992–present
- Member of: Penicillin, Crack6

Chisato (千聖; stylized in all caps) (born on August 4, 1971) is a Japanese guitarist and singer. Originally known for being the guitarist of visual kei band Penicillin since 1992, in 1996 he started a solo career that has been successful in Japan. In 2003, he founded the solo project Crack6.

== Career ==
=== Early years ===
Chisato began playing musical instruments under the influence of his father, who played trumpet. However, Chisato used to play piano. In high school, he started playing guitar and formed his first band in third grade, at a school festival. After graduating, he entered Tokai University, where he met the other members of Penicillin (Hakuei, Gisho and O-Jiro) and formed the band in 1992. They worked part-time jobs around Hon-Atsugi Station in Kanagawa.

=== Penicillin's major debut and solo career (1996–2001) ===
In 1996, along with Penicillin's debut on Tokuma, Chisato began a solo career taking on vocals and guitar, despite never having sung before. He was invited to start a solo career by the head of Tokuma Japan's production department. Chisato debuted with the single "Dance With the Wild Things", which gave the musician top 10 on the Oricon chart upon its debut. In an interview with Barks, he said that this was the only song he composed that was approved by the company; he wanted to do something within heavy metal and hard rock, but the single is closer to digital rock. His first full-length album was released in September, called Organic Groover, and also ranked tenth on the Japanese charts. The following year he released the single "Venus" and then in 1997 "Kick!", which were used as soundtrack for Japanese television series. In 1999 he performed at Nippon Budokan and The Joint at the Hard Rock Hotel in Las Vegas, both shows were recorded and released as a live album. He was the first Japanese person to perform at The Joint. In May he released his second album, Cyber Soul Pavillon, with a futuristic concept. The song "Wake Up!" was used as the opening theme for the anime Gokudo the Adventurer and "Cyber Rose" as theme for the game Air Race Championship. In 2000, his solo career as Chisato ended due to changes in the label's management. He then worked as a songwriter for the band Lucifer.

=== Crack6 (2002–present) ===
Around 2002, friends encouraged him to continue his solo career and in 2003 he started a new solo project called Crack6 (or Crack 6). In Crack6, Chisato goes under the name MSTR and their concept is "Hybrid Music Project", where they collaborate with musicians from different genres. His intention was to create a project where he interacted with various musicians instead of doing something exclusively personal. In 2007, Chisato was part of Acid Black Cherry's support band and Crack6 performed at the FanimeCon in California. In 2008, the project went on hiatus. However, it was renewed in 2009 and in 2011 they released their first album in six years, Butterfly Effect. The following year, they released the album Trickster. Chisato participated in the Dead End tribute album, Dead End Tribute -Song of Lunatics-, in 2013 and this year Crack6 released the singles "Signalism" and "Loveless". They were not included on the EP released the following year, Crazy Monsters Parade.

Bara to Pistol was Crack6's sixth album, released on June 1, 2016. In celebration of 20 years since the beginning of his solo career, Chisato released the compilation album Chisato 20th Anniversary Best Album「Can you Rock?!」 in 2017, having his most famous songs re-recorded. The track list was chosen by fans, in a vote on the official website. He said that "Cyber Rose" was, by far, the most voted. Chisato was invited to be the music producer for the anime Classicaloid and produced the compilation album Musique for the anime's soundtrack, and invited Miku from An Cafe to perform vocals. In 2018, the musician made a special release creating a duo between Crack6 and Chisato for the single "Jekyll's Sky/Mad Rider", with several special guests. In the same year, he participated in a solo album by Asagi, vocalist of D. In 2019 Crack6 released the single "Canaria" and went on a tour with the same title. An album with the same concept as the single was released in 2023 called Canaria Saishu Gakusho: Coda. Previously in 2021, the group had released the single "Break The Darkness". In January 2024, Chisato appeared on Tatsurō's radio show, to talk about Crack6's compilation album -Ever Blessing-, released in celebration of the project's 20th anniversary.

== Equipment ==
Chisato uses two guitars that are his original models, Chisato "King-V" 21Century and Chisato "Explosion" Mach55.

== Personal life ==
Chisato's birth name is Tomoaki Hayashi (林友顕, Hayashi Tomoaki) and he was born in Tokyo on October 4, 1971. He has an older brother, who owns a restaurant, and is a descendant of Okubo Toshimichi. He is a fan of Chisato Moritaka, and has a phobia of flying.

== Discography ==
=== As Chisato ===
Albuns

Title	Release	Oricon peak position	Type
Organic Groover	November 21, 1996	10	Studio album
Chisato 1996 Singles	February 26, 1996	—	Compilation album
Organic Groover ver. 2211	February 26, 1996	—	Remix album
Cyber Soul Pavillon	May 19, 1999	15	Studio album
Yabuoto ~Break!~ (破音～BREAK!～)	August 4, 1999	—	Live album
Surf Side Attack!	November 25, 1999	50	Studio album
Smash! Smash! Smash! – Chisato Live at Budokan 1999	August 19, 2000	—	Live album
Yabuoto ~Break!~ II (爆音-BREAK! II-)	December 21, 2000	—	Live album
Chisato 20th Anniversary Best Album「Can you Rock?!」	June 7, 2017	36	Compilation album

Singles

Title	Release	Oricon peak position	Notes
"Dance With the Wild Things"	September 24, 1996	10	
"Kissin' the moonlight"	October 21, 1996	20	Show Mouretsu Asia Taro theme song
"Falling over you"	November 21, 1996	48	
"Venus"	August 27, 1997	10	Series Youki Ni Cappucino opening theme
"Love ~lost in the pain~"	29 de outubro de 1997	30	
"Kick!"	February 11, 1998	13	Series Ring no Tamashii opening theme
"Cyber Rose"	March 17, 1999	28	Game Air Race Championship key song
"Wake Up!"	May 19, 1999	20	Gokudo the Adventurer opening song
"Dengeki Missile 2000"	October 27, 1999	30	Show Downtown DX ending theme

=== As Crack6 ===
Studio albuns

- Trinity (December 6, 2003)
- Fight Without Frontiers (January 26, 2005)
- Decade (December 7, 2005)
- Butterfly Effect (July 13, 2011)
- 6 elements (December 25, 2013)
- Bara to Pistol (June 1, 2016)
- Canaria Saishu Gakusho: Coda (June 6, 2023)

EPs

- Get fired up (March 23, 2007)
- Trickster (June 20, 2012)
- Crazy Monsters Parade (June 18, 2014)
- Change the World (June 3, 2015)

Singles

- "Zion" (June 6, 2003)
- "Morpheus" (August 6, 2003)
- "Persephone" (October 6, 2003)
- "Bang!" (April 7, 2004)
- "Maneuver 6" (July 7, 2004)
- "Rocketeer" (November 10, 2004)
- "Owari naki Uta" (終わりなき歌, June 6, 2006)
- "Mirai Paradox" (未来パラドックス, January 18, 2012), Oricon peak position: 46
- "Loveless" (February 13, 2013), Oricon peak position: 45
- "Signalism (シグナリズム, July 31, 2013), Oricon peak position: 40
- "Canaria" (カナリア, June 19, 2019)

=== Other works ===
- "Jekyll's Sky/Mad Rider" (June 6, 2018), as Crack6 feat. Chisato. Ending theme of Premier MelodiX! series.
