= Penicillin (band) =

Japanese visual kei rock band

- Origin: Tokyo, Japan
- Genres: Alternative rock, hard rock, industrial rock, gothic rock
- Years active: 1992–present
- Labels: Pioneer LDC, East West Japan, Omega A.T. Music, Avex Trax/HiBOOM, Crown, That Records/Blowgrow
- Members: Hakuei; Chisato; O-Jiro
- Past members: Yuuji; Shaisuke; Gisho
- Website: penicillin.jp

Penicillin (stylized as PENICILLIN) is a Japanese visual kei alternative rock band, formed in Tokyo in 1992.

== History ==
Formed by friends at Tokai University in Tokyo, Japan on February 14, 1992. Penicillin began with Chisato on vocals, Gisho on bass, O-Jiro on drums and both Yuuji and Shaisuke on guitar. Before anything was recorded however the band's line-up changed to Hakuei on vocals, Gisho on bass, O-Jiro on drums and both Shaisuke and Chisato on guitar. Their name was taken from the punk rock group "Penicillin Shock" in the manga series To-y and they titled their first album, which was released in 1994 and produced by Kiyoshi of Media Youth, after the fictional band. Hakuei later stated that when the band started, he wanted to play hardcore punk in a violent and flashy style like Gastunk. To his recollection, the term "visual kei" did not exist when they formed, but Penicillin were quickly labeled as such. After their first album, Shaisuke left the band to join Deshabillz. Penicillin released Missing Link, their second album, in December 1994. In June 1995, they released God of Grind -Real Penicillin Shock-, which is a re-recording of their first album.

Penicillin made their major label debut in March 1996 with "Blue Moon" on Pioneer LDC. On July 25 and 26, they performed at the Nippon Budokan while still a new band. In 1997 they released Limelight, which was named one of the top albums from 1989-1998 in a 2004 issue of the music magazine Band Yarouze. Penicillin stayed on Pioneer until 1998 when they changed to East West Japan. Their sixth single "Romance" was released on January 15, 1998, and ranked within the top 10 on the Oricon chart for six consecutive weeks, selling over 900,000 copies. It was the opening theme of the Sexy Commando Gaiden: Sugoi yo!! Masaru-san anime adaptation. After they were dropped by East West Japan they changed to Omega A.T. Music (an indie label) in 2001. Omega happens to be under Omega Project Holdings which Yoshiaki Kondou (Gisho) is the CEO of. However they were only on Omega for a year before being picked up by Hiboom, which was an indie subsidiary of Avex Trax. In 2005 when Hiboom was closed, they were picked up directly by Avex Trax and were once again on a major label.

On December 12, 2005, Penicillin celebrated its 15th anniversary as a band. On March 9, 2007, Gisho announced that he would leave the band. His last live was his birthday on May 20, 2007, at Shibuya O-East. Since then the band has continued on as a three piece unit. During the February 11, 2008, live, it was announced the Penicillin would once again change labels, this time to Nippon Crown.

In 2010, Penicillin established the independent record label That Records. The first release by the new label was their single "Rosetta" on August 4.

Penicillin's song "Romance" was covered by And on the compilation Crush! -90's V-Rock Best Hit Cover Songs-. The album was released on January 26, 2011, and features current visual kei bands covering songs from bands that were important to the '90s visual kei movement. It was also covered by Jui for the similar album Counteraction - V-Rock covered Visual Anime songs Compilation-, which was released on May 23, 2012, and features covers of songs by visual kei bands that were used in anime.

They covered "Hawaiian Roller Coaster Ride", from Lilo & Stitch, for the cover album V-Rock Disney, which was released on September 7, 2011, and features visual kei artists covering Disney songs.

Penicillin released their first cover album, Memories ~Japanese Masterpieces~ which is composed of songs by female singers, on March 18, 2015. The artwork for the album was drawn by Atsushi Kamijo, author of the manga from which the group took their name.

== Member information ==
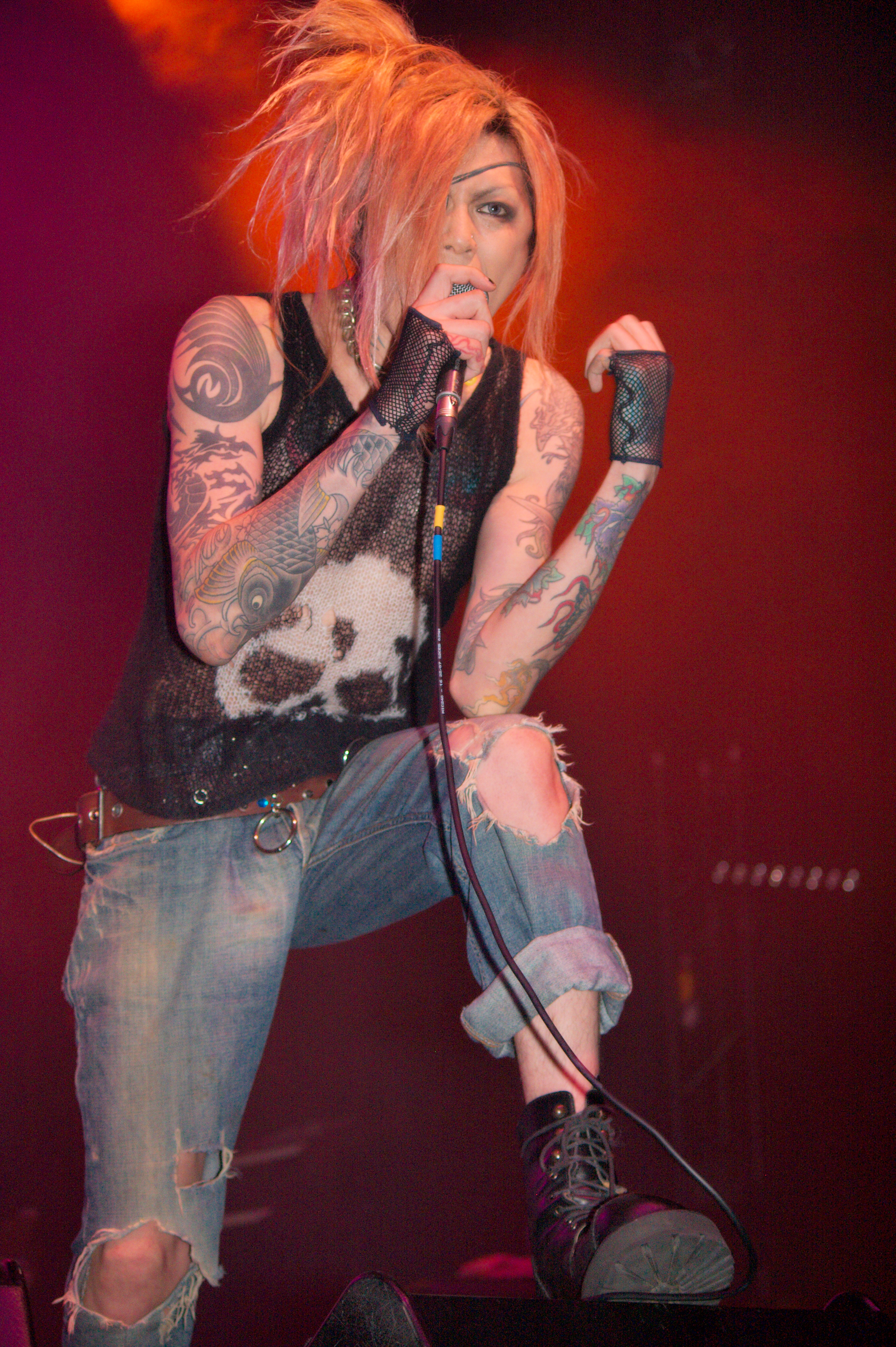
Vocalist Hakuei in 2008

- Hakuei: (vocals) Born December 16, 1970, in Miyazaki Prefecture, Kushima City. However, when his parents divorced in 2nd grade of elementary school he moved with his mother to Aomori prefecture Hirosaki City. At Tokai University he got his degree from the general education department. In 1996 he made his solo debut with the single "Zeus". In 1997 he worked as an actor in the movie -Thirty 30- and in 1998 he played Hamlet in Penicillin's Rock Opera Hamlet (written by Kiyoshi, ex-hide with Spread Beaver). In 1999 he joined up with Kiyoshi once more for the duo Machine, which is currently active. Hakuei currently is a model for Black Peace Now, and draws a comic strip featured monthly in Fool's Mate called Susume! Tonosama. He's a member of a secret band called Kaizoku which only does secret lives. When Penicillin performs live on his birthday it's known as "Super Heart Core"
- Chisato (千聖): (guitar) Born October 4, 1971, in Tokyo, Japan. He attended Tokai University and received a degree in pre-law. In September 1996 he made his solo debut with "Dance with the wild things". During his solo career he's played notable places such as Nippon Budokan. In the late 1990s he wrote music for and produced the band Lucifer. In the past he's worked on R with the likes of Kiyoshi & O-jiro, Crack-Z with friend Satoro from ZZ, and Nano with Hakuei. Currently he's doing a solo project under the alias MSTR with the band Crack6, as well as under Chisato doing live guitar support for Acid Black Cherry. When Penicillin performs for his birthday it's known as "Rock x Rock"
- O-Jiro: (drums) Born September 14, 1972, in Chiba, Japan. He attended Tokai University as well, but did not graduate from it. He has done side projects such as R, with Chisato and Kiyoshi, 808, with Yasumichan of Sleep My Dear, and Starman, with Gisho as well as Yasumichan and Ken from Sleep My Dear. When Penicillin performs on his birthday it's known as "Tono!Gig"

Former

- Gisho: (bass) Born May 20, 1971, in Hyogo Prefecture. Gisho attended Tokai University and got a degree in Economics. He used the name Ootaki Jun for his solo career. He starred in the movie Shonan Bakuzo Zuku Arakure Knight. In 2001 he joined Omega Project Holdings and later became their CEO. He's a fan of Keanu Reeves and The Matrix and because of that his birthday lives were titled "Gishorix Revolution" his last live with the band was on May 20, 2007, at Shibuya O-East and it was known was "Gishorix Revolution -Never Ending Story-".
- Yuuji: (guitar)
- Shaisuke: (guitar) After departing Penicillin, he switched to bass and joined Deshabillz and Baiser. Died in July 2001 from a motorcycle accident.

== Discography ==
=== Studio albums ===
| Title | Release | Oricon ranking |
|---|---|---|
| Penicillin Shock | May 30, 1994 | |
| Missing Link | December 24, 1994 | |
| God of Grind -Real Penicillin Shock- | June 20, 1995 | |
| Into the Valley of the Dolls | September 30, 1995 | 45 |
| Earth | September 30, 1995 | 44 |
| Missing Link | October 25, 1995 | 46 |
| Vibe∞ | June 26, 1996 | 10 |
| Indwell | July 24, 1996 | 75 |
| Fly Penicillin featuring Chisato (FLY PENICILLIN featuring 千聖) | November 27, 1996 | 37 |
| Limelight | July 2, 1997 | 8 |
| Ultimate Velocity | October 21, 1998 | 2 |
| Union Jap | May 24, 2000 | 19 |
| Nuclear Banana | November 7, 2001 | 27 |
| No.53 | October 30, 2002 | 48 |
| Kakkaku (赫赫) | October 1, 2003 | 55 |
| Flower Circus | October 20, 2004 | 44 |
| Hell Bound Heart | November 23, 2005 | 72 |
| Blue Heaven | February 28, 2007 | 87 |
| Supernova | November 26, 2008 | 71 |
| Cell | November 4, 2009 | 52 |
| Will | March 2, 2011 | 31 |
| Ruriiro no Providence (瑠璃色のプロヴィデンス) | March 19, 2014 | 56 |
| Lunatic Lover | November 9, 2016 | 35 |
| Lover's Melancholy | September 20, 2017 | 41 |
| Megalomania no Tsubasa (メガロマニアの翼) | November 7, 2018 | 40 |
| Kowloon Head (九龍頭 -KOWLOON HEAD-) | November 6, 2019 | 46 |
| Paraiso (パライゾ) | November 2, 2022 | 25 |

=== Singles ===
| Title | Release | Oricon Ranking |
|---|---|---|
| "In the Kingdom of the Moonlight" | September 30, 1995 | |
| "Melody/Mother Goose" (Melody/マザー・グース) | January 25, 1996 | |
| "Blue Moon/Tenshi yo Mezame te" (Blue Moon / 天使よ目覚めて) | March 15, 1996 | 17 |
| "Imitation Love/Never Ending Story" | May 15, 1996 | 19 |
| "99banme no yoru" (99番目の夜) | March 19, 1997 | 9 |
| "Dead or Alive" | May 28, 1997 | 12 |
| "Yoru wo Buttobase" (夜をぶっとばせ) | June 25, 1997 | 18 |
| "Romance" (ロマンス) | January 15, 1998 | 4 |
| "Make Love" | May 30, 1998 | 8 |
| "Crash" | September 9, 1998 | 4 |
| "Butterfly" | November 26, 1998 | 24 |
| "Nice in Lip+L" | September 1, 1999 | 9 |
| "Risou no shita" (理想の舌) | February 23, 2000 | 20 |
| "Ultrider" (ウルトライダー) | May 17, 2000 | 23 |
| "Japanese Industrial Students" | May 17, 2000 | 25 |
| "Inazuma" (イナズマ) | January 24, 2001 | 47 |
| "Limit Complex" (リミットコンプレックス) | May 30, 2001 | 66 |
| "Fukai no Suna/St. Marian Hurricane" (腐海の砂 / 聖・MARIAN HURRICANE) | November 28, 2001 | 24 |
| "New Future" | June 26, 2002 | 42 |
| "Hanazono Kinema" (花園キネマ) | September 19, 2002 | 27 |
| "Yojigen Diver/Shonen Diver" (四次元ダイバー・少年ダイバー) | May 28, 2003 | 46 |
| "Byakuro no Mai " (白髏の舞) | November 27, 2003 | 60 |
| "Samurai Boy/Love Dragoon" | May 26, 2004 | 67 |
| "Freesia" (フリージア) | February 2, 2005 | 50 |
| "Jump#1/Hakana" (JUMP#1 / ハカナ) | June 28, 2005 | 30 |
| "Tsuki Senko Teru/Zero" (月千古輝/零) | March 15, 2006 | 42 |
| "Hyper Chord/Hyper Kids ~Tokai Daigaku Monogatari~" (hyper chord / hyper kids～東海大学物語～) | September 27, 2006 | 35 |
| "Grind Candy/Eden" (Grind Candy / エデン) | January 31, 2007 | 33 |
| "Sun" (太陽, Taiyo) | April 23, 2008 | 45 |
| "Rainbow/Scream" | August 20, 2008 | 37 |
| "Blackhole" | May 8, 2009 | 26 |
| "Warp" | September 2, 2009 | 24 |
| "Rosetta" | August 4, 2010 | 28 |
| "Gensō Catharsis" (幻想カタルシス) | October 9, 2013 | 22 |
| "Sol" | September 10, 2014 | 32 |
| "Stranger" | October 14, 2015 | 18 |

=== Compilation albums ===
| Title | Release | Oricon ranking |
|---|---|---|
| This is Penicillin 1994–1999 | October 6, 1999 | 6 |
| Singles | February 21, 2001 | 48 |
| 20th Anniversary Fan Selection Best Album Dragon Hearts | November 4, 2009 | 27 |
| 20th Anniversary Member Selection Best Phoenix Star | March 2, 2011 | 75 |
| 30 -Thirty- Universe | February 1, 2023 | 45 |

=== Cover albums ===
| Title | Release | Oricon ranking |
|---|---|---|
| Memories ~Japanese Masterpiece~ | March 18, 2015 | 51 |
