= Minami-Senri Station =

Railway station in Suita, Osaka Prefecture, Japan

Coordinates: 34.7922°N 135.5088°E

Minami-Senri Station 南千里駅
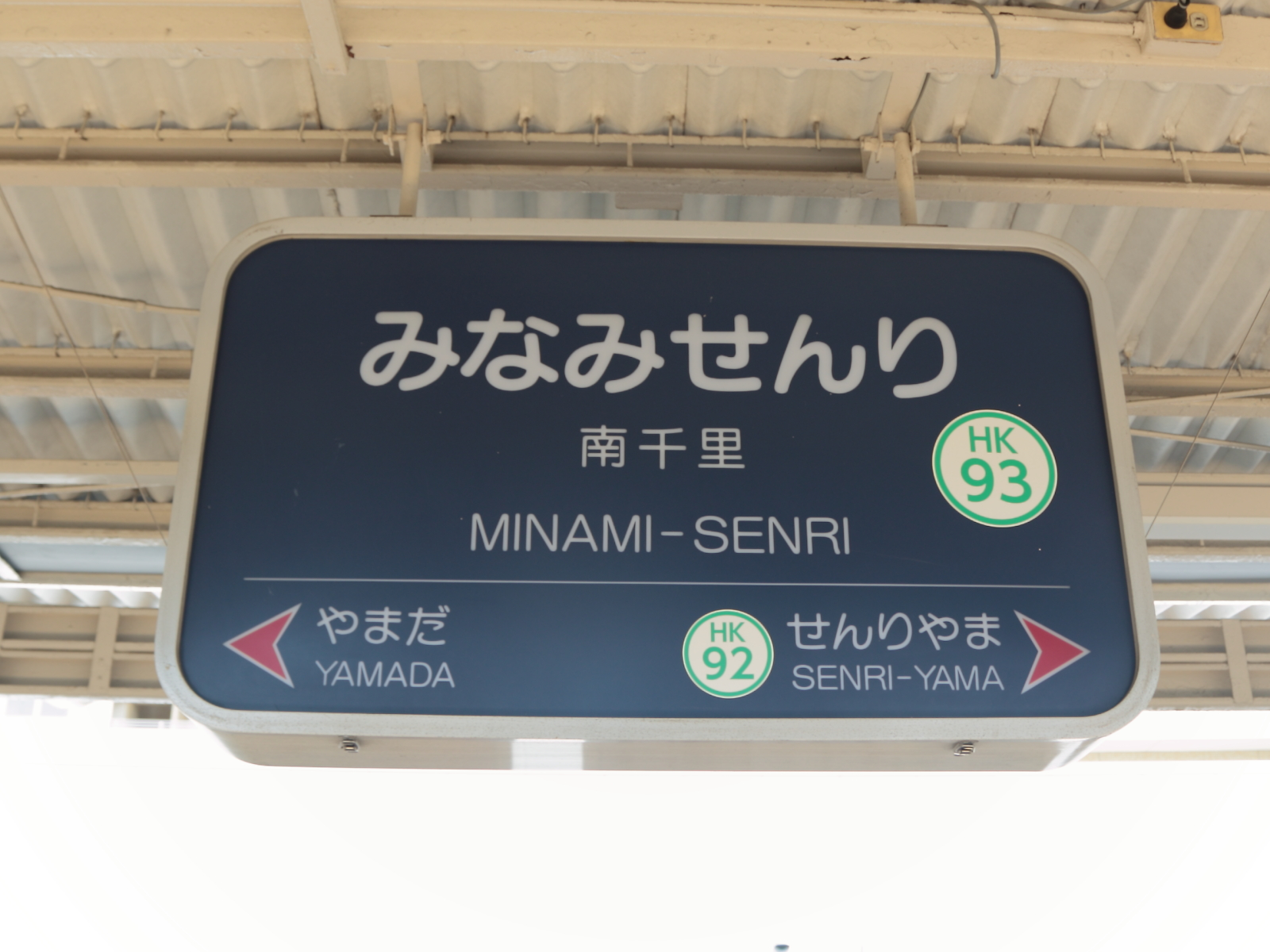

General information
- Location: Suita, Osaka; Japan
- Operator: Hankyu Railway
- Line: Senri Line

Other information
- Station code: HK-93

History
- Opened: August 29, 1963

Services
| Preceding station | Hankyu Railway | Following station |
|---|---|---|
| Senriyama towards Tenjimbashisuji Rokuchōme | Senri Line Local | Yamada towards Kita-Senri |
Location

Minami-Senri Station (南千里駅, Minami-Senri-eki) is a station located in Suita, Osaka Prefecture, Japan.

== Lines ==
- Hankyu Senri Line

== History ==
- August 29, 1963 - Shin-Senriyama was opened as the northern terminus of the Senri Line.
- March 1, 1967 - The Senri Line was extended to Kita-Senri Station. At the opening of that station, Shin-Senriyama was renamed Minami-Senri.
