= Suita =

Suita 吹田市
- Core city
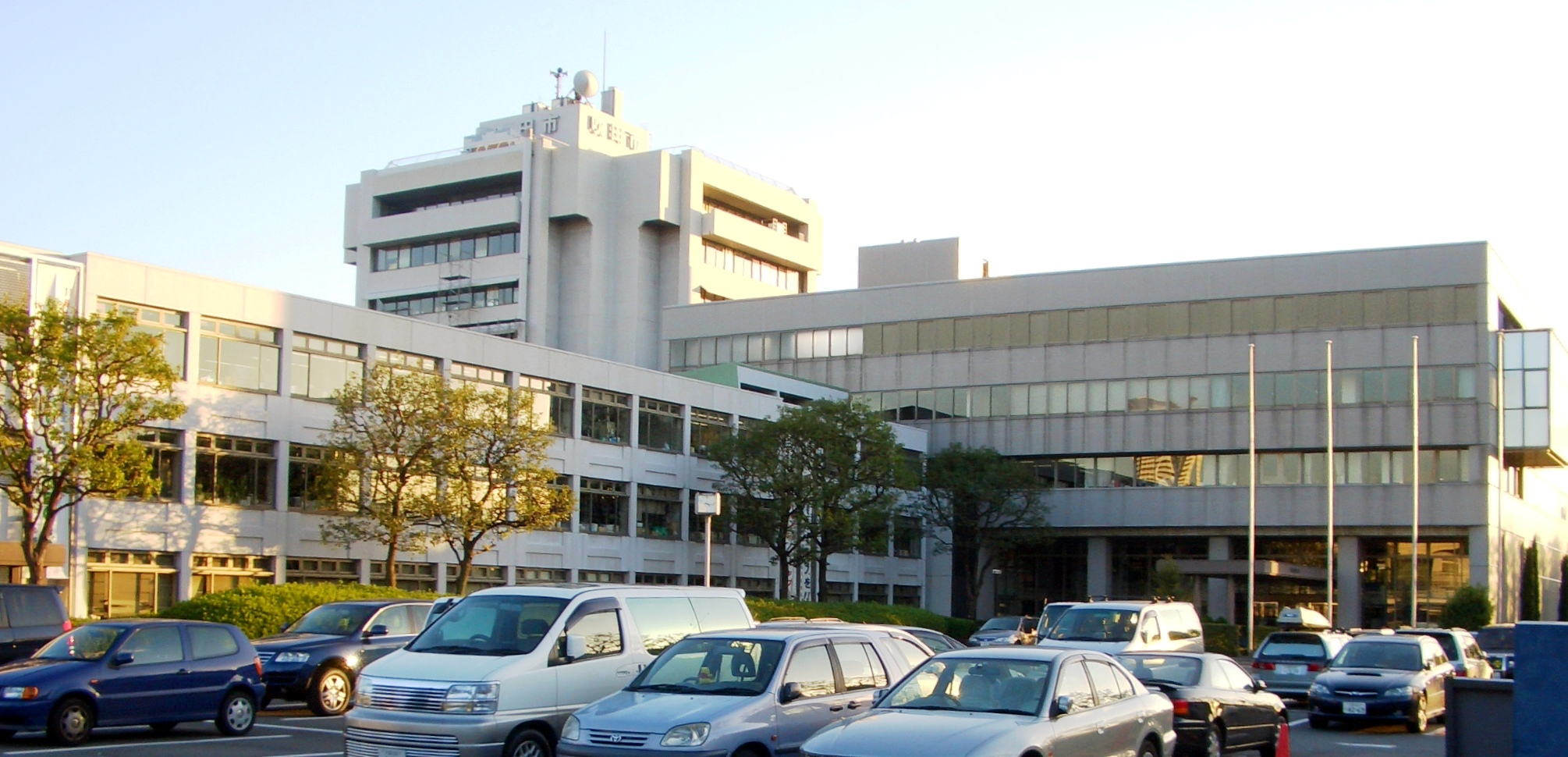
- Suita City Hall

- Flag Seal
- Location of Suita in Osaka Prefecture

- Location in Japan
- Coordinates: 34°45′34″N 135°31′1″E
- Country: Japan
- Region: Kansai
- Prefecture: Osaka

Government
  - Mayor: Keiji Goto (since May 2015)

Area
  - Total: 36.09 km^{2} (13.93 sq mi)

Population (March 31, 2023)
  - Total: 381,238
  - Density: 10,560/km^{2} (27,360/sq mi)
- Time zone: UTC+09:00 (JST)
- City hall address: 1-3-40 Izumichō, Suita-shi, Osaka-fu 564-8550
- Website: Official website
- Symbols
- Flower: Satsuki azalea
- Tree: Camphor laurel

Suita (吹田市, Suita-shi) is a city located in Osaka Prefecture, Japan. As of 31 March 2023, the city had an estimated population of 381,238 in 182,636 households, and a population density of 11,000 persons per km^{2}. The total area of the city is 36.09 square kilometres (13.93 sq mi). It is a suburb of Osaka City and a part of the Kyoto–Osaka–Kobe metropolitan area.

== Geography ==
Suita is located in northern Osaka Prefecture. The northern part of the city is occupied by the gently sloping Senri Hills, and the southern part is a plain made up of the Yodo River, Aui River, Kanzaki River, and sediments carried from rivers that originate in Senri Hills. The elevation of the city ranges from 1.5 meters to 115.7 meters above sea level. The city limits are 6.4 kilometers from east-to-west and 9.6 kilometers from north-to-south. In the past, the sea was right next to the city, and place names such as Toyotsu and Takahama still remain today. The Ani River runs through the southern edge of the city limits, and the Kanzaki River flows from east to west.

=== Neighboring municipalities ===
Osaka Prefecture

- Higashiyodogawa-ku
- Ibaraki
- Minoh
- Settsu
- Toyonaka
- Yodogawa-ku

== Climate ==
Suita has a Humid subtropical climate (Köppen Cfa) characterized by warm summers and cool winters with light to no snowfall. The average annual temperature in Suita is 15.0 °C. The average annual rainfall is 1475 mm with September as the wettest month. The temperatures are highest on average in August, at around 26.9 °C, and lowest in January, at around 3.6 °C.

== Demographics ==
Per Japanese census data, the population of Suita has risen steadily over the past century.

Historical population
Year	Pop.	±%
1940	66,094	—
1950	78,415	+18.6%
1960	120,203	+53.3%
1970	257,590	+114.3%
1980	326,968	+26.9%
1990	342,179	+4.7%
2000	346,145	+1.2%
2010	351,771	+1.6%
2020	376,101	+6.9%

== History ==
The area of the modern city of Suita was within ancient Settsu Province, and has been continuously inhabited since the Japanese Paleolithic period. In 785 AD, Wake no Kiyomaro constructed a canal between the Yodo River and the Kanzaki River in what is now Suita, and from the Heian period, the area was occupied by shōen landed estates of the nobility and the imperial family. In the Edo Period, it was divided between estates directly controlled by Tokugawa shogunate and those controlled by the Imperial family. The village of Suita was established with the creation of the modern municipalities system on April 1, 1889. On April 1, 1896 the area became part of Mishima District, Osaka. Suita was raised to town status on April 1, 1898 and to city status on January 1, 1940. The city was the site of Expo '70, a World's Fair held in 1970. On April 1, 2001 Suita was designated a Special city with increased local autonomy.

== Government ==
Suita has a mayor-council form of government with a directly elected mayor and a unicameral city council of 36 members. Suita contributes four members to the Osaka Prefectural Assembly. In terms of national politics, the city is part of Osaka 7th district of the lower house of the Diet of Japan.

== Economy ==
Suita is a regional commercial center and distribution hub for northern Osaka. Due to its proximity to the Osaka metropolitan area, it is also a commuter town. The city also has a growing and very diverse industrial base.

=== Major companies and industries ===
- Asahi Suita Brewery
- KANOMAX Measurement Instruments Suita
- First Headquarters of SNK, the producer of Neo Geo arcade boards and games. Prior to moving to Yodogawa-ku on March 20, 2023.

== Education ==
=== Universities ===
- Kansai University's main branch is located here. It is accessible through Kandaimae Station on the Hankyu Senri Line.
- Osaka Gakuin University, accessible through Kishibe Station on JR Kyoto Line.
- Osaka University's main administrative campus is hosted here, right beside the Expo Park. It is accessible via the Osaka Monorail at Handaibyoinmae Station, or via Hankyu Senri Line at Kita-Senri Station.
- Senri Kinran University, accessible through Kita-Senri Station on Hankyu Senri Line.
- Yamato University

=== Primary and secondary education ===
Suita has 38 public elementary schools and 18 public middle schools operated by the city government and one elementary school and one junior high school operated by Osaka City. Suita has five public high schools operated by the Osaka Prefectural Department of Education. There are also two private combined middle/high schools and one private high school. The prefecture also operates one special education school for the handicapped.

== Transportation ==
=== Railway ===
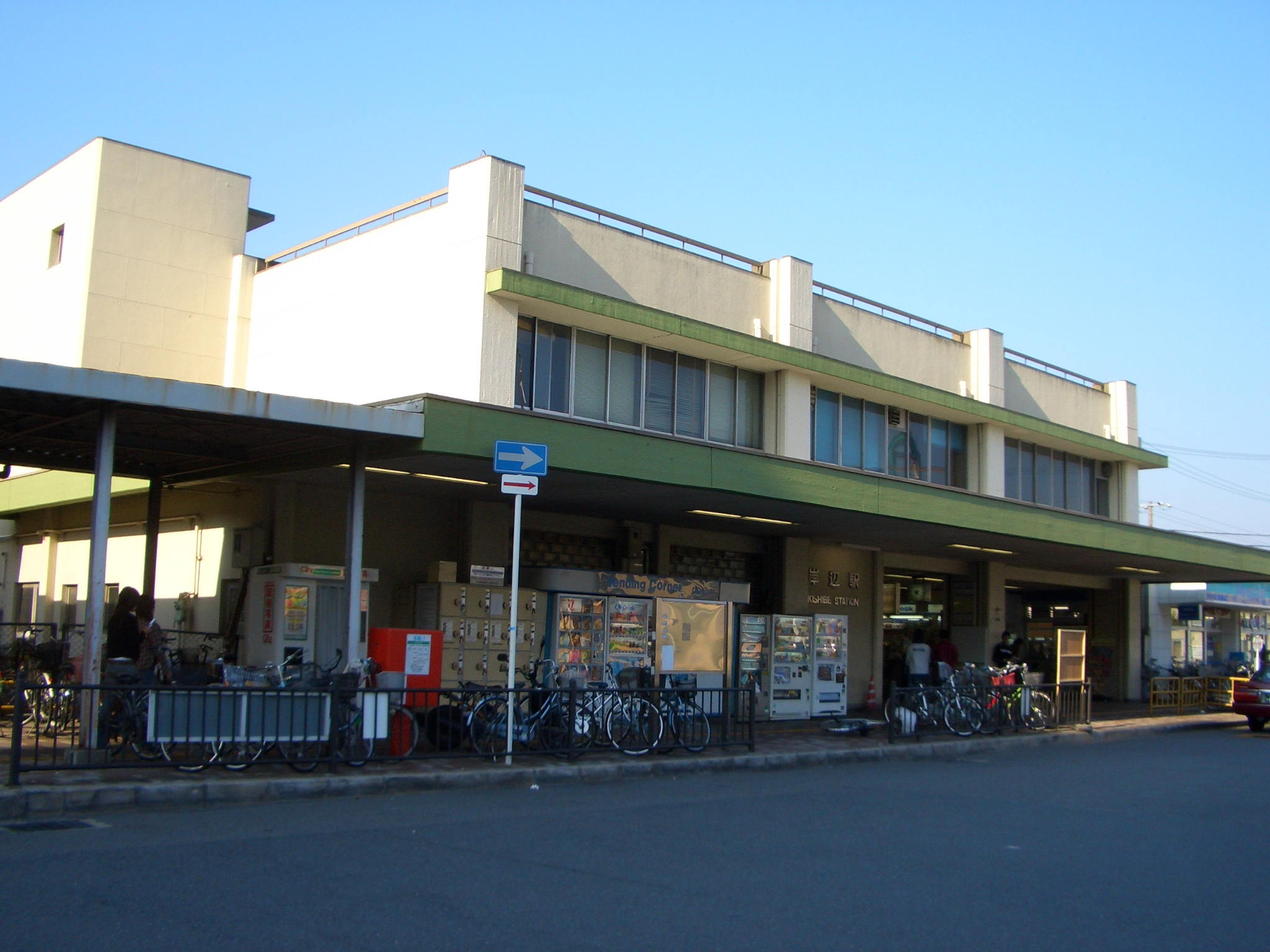
JR Kishibe Station

JR West – JR Kyōto Line

- Kishibe - Suita

JR West – Osaka Higashi Line

- Minami-Suita

Hankyu Railway Hankyu Kyoto Line

- Shōjaku

Hankyu Railway Hankyu Senri Line

- Suita - Toyotsu - Kandai-mae - Senriyama - Minami-Senri - Yamada - Kita-Senri

Kita-Osaka Kyuko Railway

- Momoyama-dai - Esaka

Osaka Metro - Midosuji Line

- Esaka

Osaka Monorail - Main Line

- Yamada - Bampaku-kinen-kōen

Osaka Monorail - Saito Line

- Koen-higashiguchi - Bampaku-kinen-kōen

=== Highway ===
- Meishin Expressway
- Chūgoku Expressway
- Kinki Expressway
- National Route 423
- National Route 479

== Sister cities ==
- Moratuwa, Sri Lanka, since July 20, 1982
- Canterbury-Bankstown, New South Wales, Australia, since May 12, 2016

Suita was involved in Bankstown's first international sister city in March 1989.

== Local attractions ==
- Expo Commemoration Park
- The J-League soccer club Gamba Osaka plays at Suita City Football Stadium.

=== Museums ===
- National Museum of Ethnology
- International Institute for Children's Literature, Osaka
- The Japan Folk Crafts Museum, Osaka
- Kansai University Museum
- Suita City Museum
- Asahi Beer Museum

== Notable residents of Suita ==
- Taro Hakase, violinist and composer
- Kami Hiraiwa, actress
- Akira Kasai, politician
- Jiro Kuwata, manga artist
- Masaki Kyomoto, actor, singer song-writer
- Avi Schafer, professional basketball player
- Tadashi Shimizu, politician
- Eri Tokunaga, actress
- Akira Yoshino, chemist and Nobel laureate
