= Kita-Senri Station =

Railway station in Suita, Osaka Prefecture, Japan

Coordinates: 34.8198°N 135.5113°E

Kita-Senri Station 北千里駅
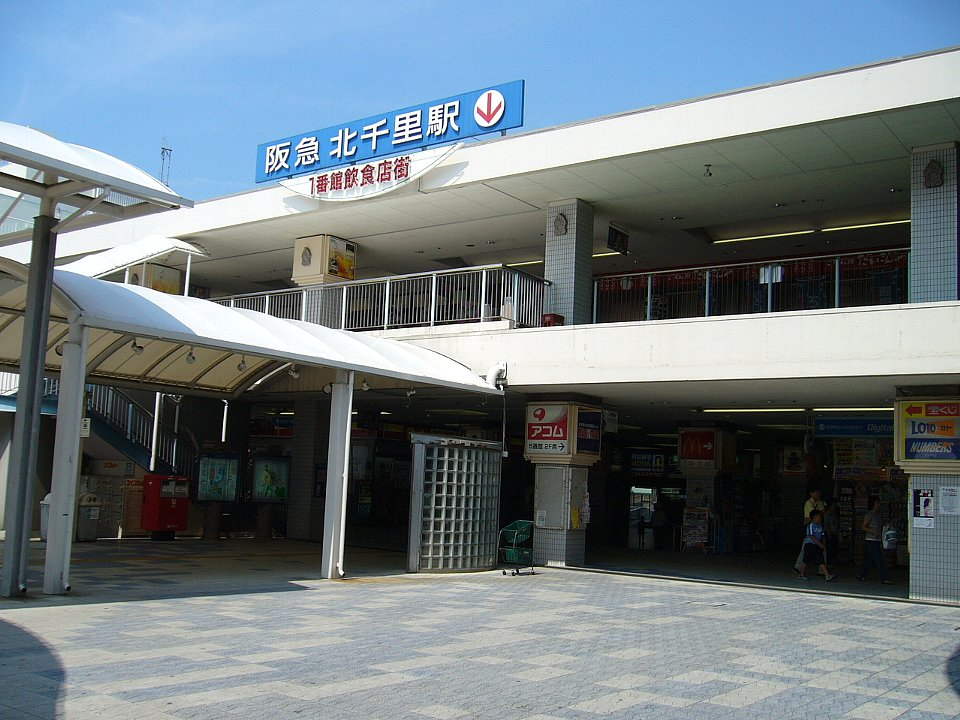

General information
- Location: Suita, Osaka; Japan
- Operator: Hankyu
- Line: Hankyu Senri Line

Other information
- Station code: HK-95

History
- Opened: 1 March 1967

Services
Preceding station	Hankyu Railway	Following station
Yamada towards Tenjimbashisuji Rokuchōme	Senri Line Local	Terminus
Location

Kita-Senri Station (北千里駅, Kita-Senri-eki) is a railway station on the Hankyu Senri Line in Suita, Osaka, Japan, operated by the private railway operator Hankyu Corporation.

== Lines ==
Kita-Senri Station is the northern terminus of the 13.6 km Hankyu Senri Line.

== Station layout ==
The station has two side platforms serving two elevated tracks. Ticket gates are located under the platforms and the tracks.

It was the first station in the world to use automated ticket gates, developed by Omron, and introduced in 1967.

=== Platforms ===
1	■ Senri Line (through to the Kyoto Line)	for Awaji, Umeda, Kobe and Takarazuka
2	■ Senri Line (through to the subway Sakaisuji Line)	for Awaji, Tenjimbashisuji Rokuchome and Tengachaya

== History ==
Kita-Senri Station opened on 1 March 1967.

== Passenger statistics ==
In 2011, the station was used by an average of 28,549 passengers daily.
