= Shōji Station (Toyonaka) =

Monorail station in Toyonaka, Osaka Prefecture, Japan

Shōji Station 少路駅
- Station building in 2025

General information
- Location: Japan
- Coordinates: 34°48′15.38″N 135°28′31.61″E
- Operator: Osaka Monorail
- Line: Main Line
- Platforms: 1 - Island platform
- Tracks: 2

Construction
- Structure type: Elevated
- Accessible: Yes

Other information
- Station code: 14

History
- Opened: 30 September 1994
Location

Shōji Station (少路駅, Shōji-eki) is a monorail station on the Osaka Monorail Main Line located in Toyonaka, Osaka Prefecture, Japan.

== Line ==
- Osaka Monorail Main Line

== Layout ==
- There is an island platform with two tracks elevated. The platform is sealed in with glass walls and doors.

| 1 | ■ Main Line | for Senri-Chūō, Bampaku-kinen-kōen, Minami-Ibaraki and Kadoma-shi |
| 2 | ■ Main Line | for Hotarugaike and Osaka Airport |

== History ==
Shoji Station opened on 30 September 1994 as part of a 7.9 km (4.9 mi) extension west from Senri-Chūō Station.

The platform edge doors at this station became operational on 31 October 2020.

== Adjacent stations ==
| « | Service | » |
Osaka Monorail Main Line (14)
| Shibahara-handai-mae (13) | - | Senri-Chūō (15) |

== Gallery ==
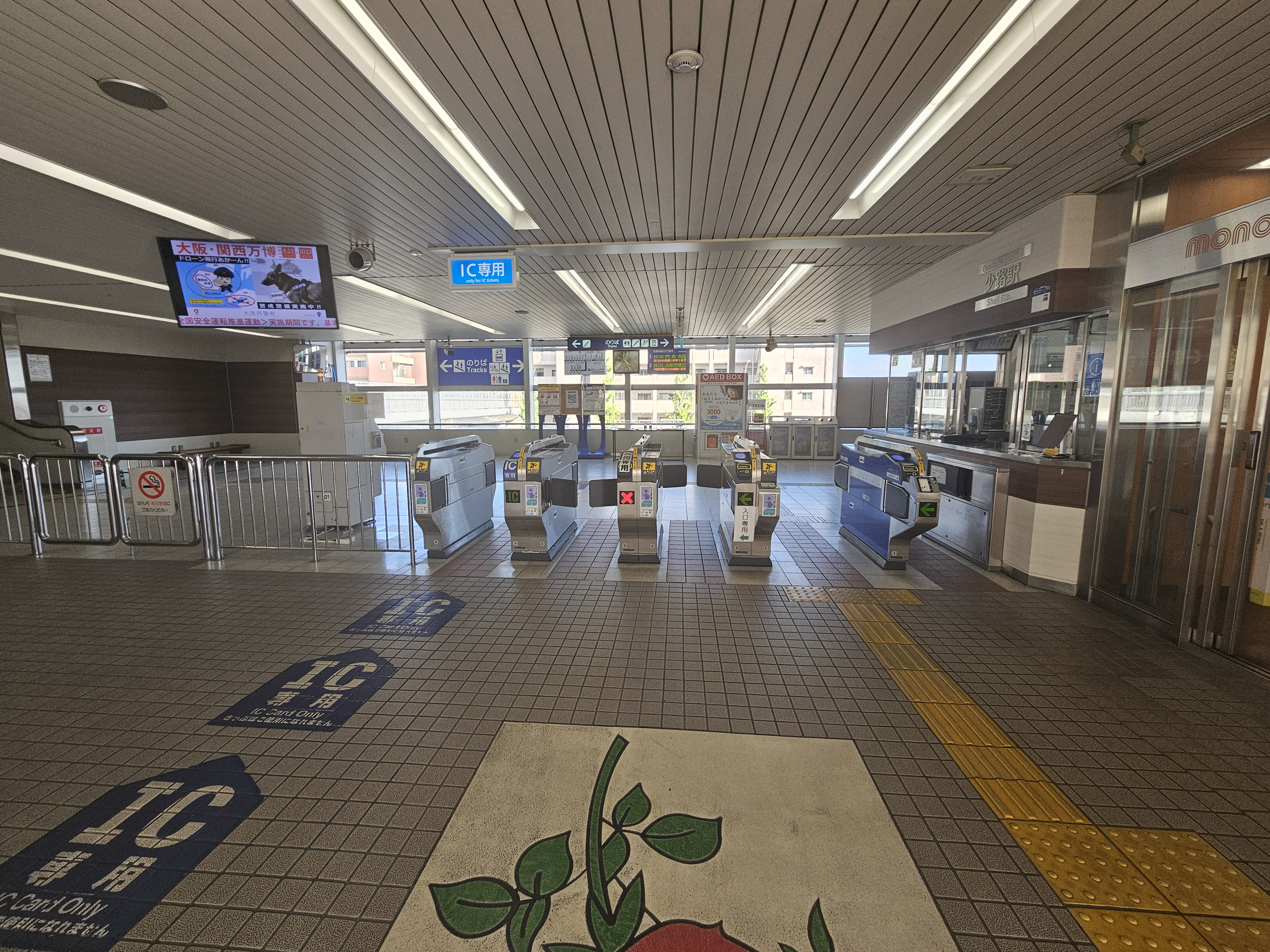
Ticket gates

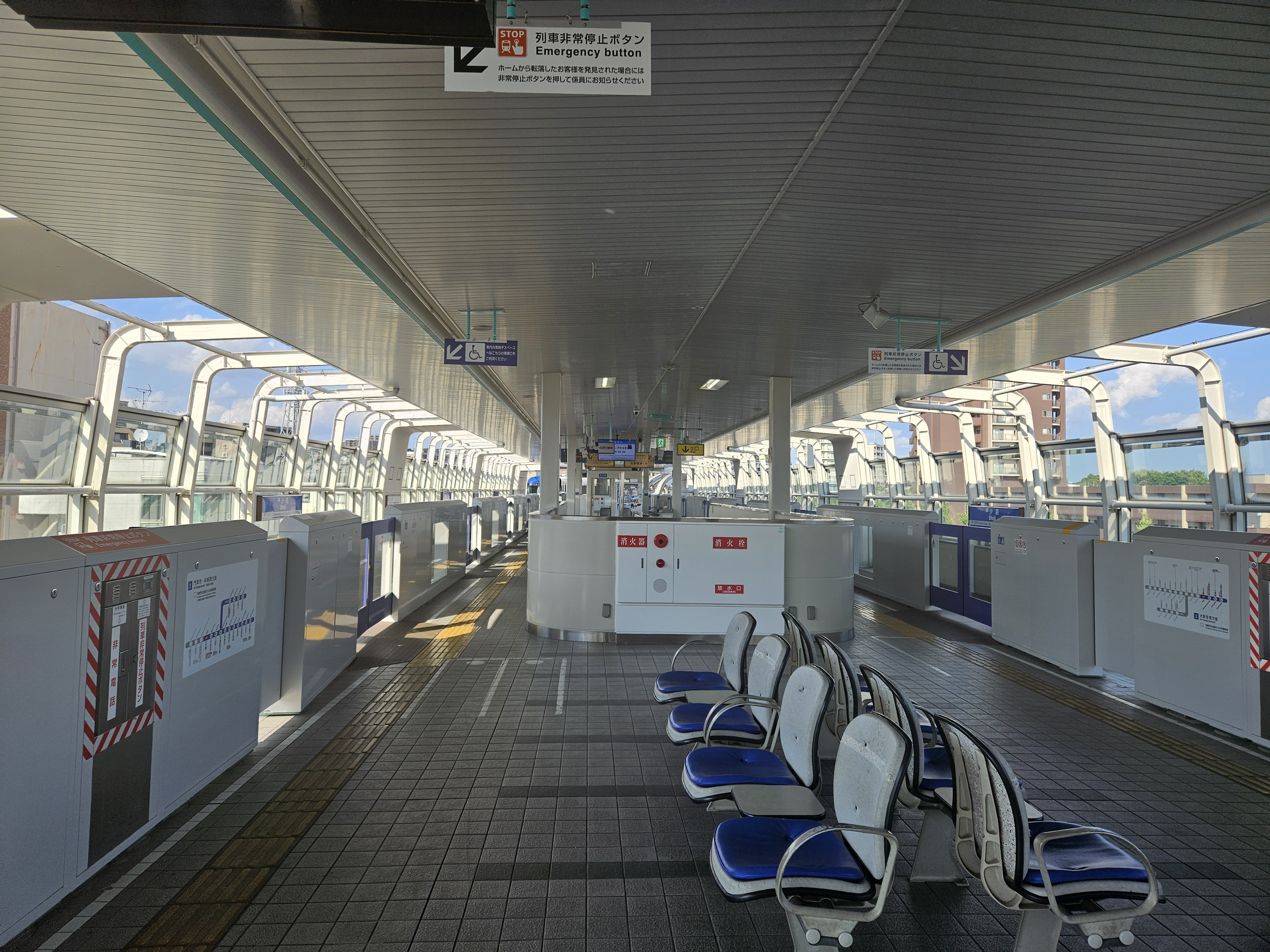
Platform view
