= Shibahara-handai-mae Station =

Monorail station in Toyonaka, Osaka Prefecture, Japan

Shibahara-handai-mae Station 柴原阪大前駅
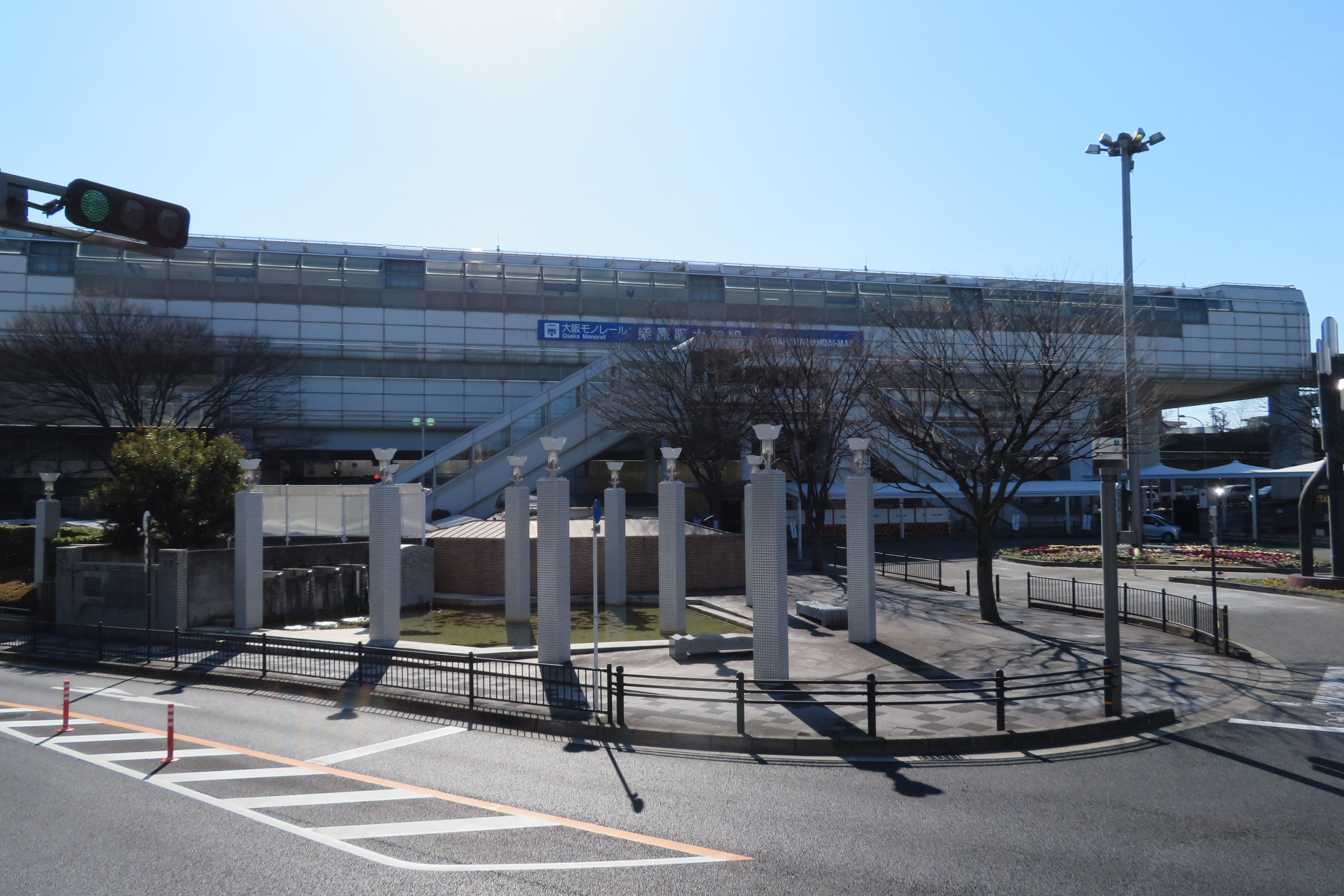
- Station building in 2020

General information
- Location: Japan
- Coordinates: 34°48′1.43″N 135°27′30.78″E
- Operator: Osaka Monorail
- Line: Main Line
- Platforms: 2 Side platforms
- Tracks: 2

Construction
- Structure type: Elevated
- Accessible: Yes

Other information
- Station code: 13

History
- Opened: 30 September 1994
Location

Shibahara-handai-mae Station (柴原阪大前駅, Shibahara-Handai-mae Eki) is a Japanese monorail station of Osaka Monorail in Toyonaka, Osaka Prefecture, Japan. "Handai" is a nickname in Japanese for Osaka University, and this station is close to the university's Toyonaka Campus.

On October 1, 2019, this station was renamed from Shibahara Station (柴原駅).

== Lines ==
- Osaka Monorail Main Line

== Layout ==
There is an island platform and two tracks elevated. The platform is sealed in with glass walls and doors.

1	■ Osaka Monorail Main Line	for Kadomashi
2	■ Osaka Monorail Main Line	for Osaka Airport

== History ==
The station opened on 30 September 1994 as part of a 7.9 km (4.9 mi) extension west from Senri-Chūō Station.

On 28 August 2021, the platform screen doors began operation.

== Adjacent stations ==
«	Service	»
Osaka Monorail Main Line (13)
Hotarugaike (12)	-	Shoji (14)
