= Sawaragi Station =

Monorail station in Ibaraki, Osaka Prefecture, Japan

Sawaragi Station 沢良宜駅
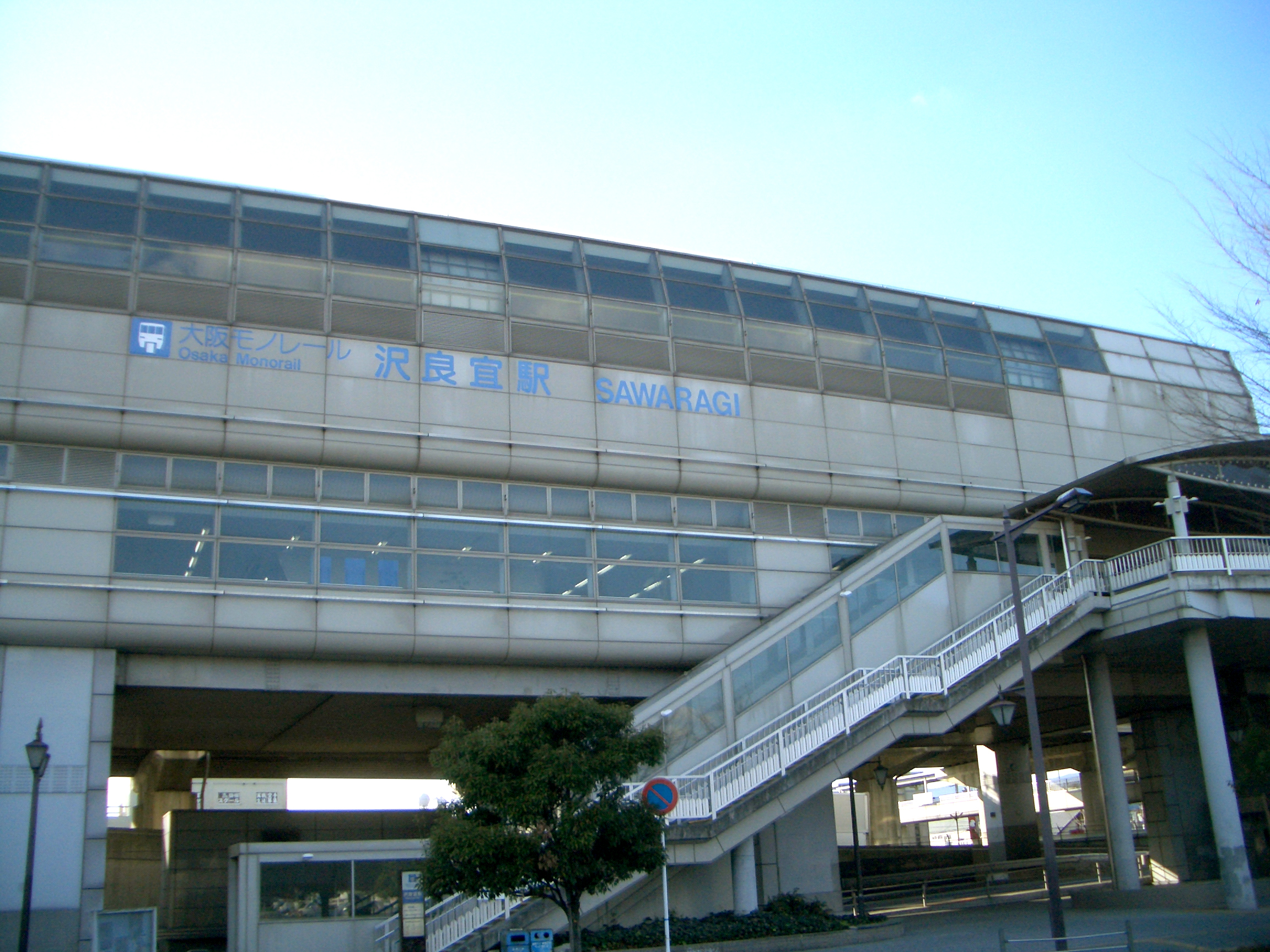
- Station building

General information
- Location: Japan
- Coordinates: 34°47′35.25″N 135°33′56.54″E
- Operator: Osaka Monorail
- Line: Main Line
- Platforms: 1 - Island platform
- Tracks: 2

Construction
- Structure type: Elevated
- Accessible: Yes

Other information
- Station code: 20

History
- Opened: 22 August 1997
Location

Sawaragi Station (沢良宜駅, Sawaragi-eki) is a monorail station on the Osaka Monorail located in Ibaraki, Osaka, Japan.

== Lines ==
- Osaka Monorail Main Line (Station Number: 20)

== Layout ==
There is an island platform and two tracks elevated. The platform is sealed in with glass walls and doors.

| 1 | ■ Osaka Monorail Main Line | for Kadomashi |
| 2 | ■ Osaka Monorail Main Line | for Osaka Airport |

== History ==
Sawaragi Station opened on 22 August 1997 when the Osaka Monorail Main Line was extended from Minami Ibaraki to Kadoma-shi.

== Adjacent stations ==
| « | Service | » |
Osaka Monorail Main Line (20)
| Minami Ibaraki (19) | - | Settsu (21) |
