= Shōji Station =

Shōji Station may refer to:

- Shōji Station (Osaka) in Ikuno-ku, Osaka, Osaka Prefecture, Japan
- Shōji Station (Toyonaka) in Toyonaka, Osaka Prefecture, Japan
