= Osaka Monorail Main Line =

Monorail line in Osaka, Japan

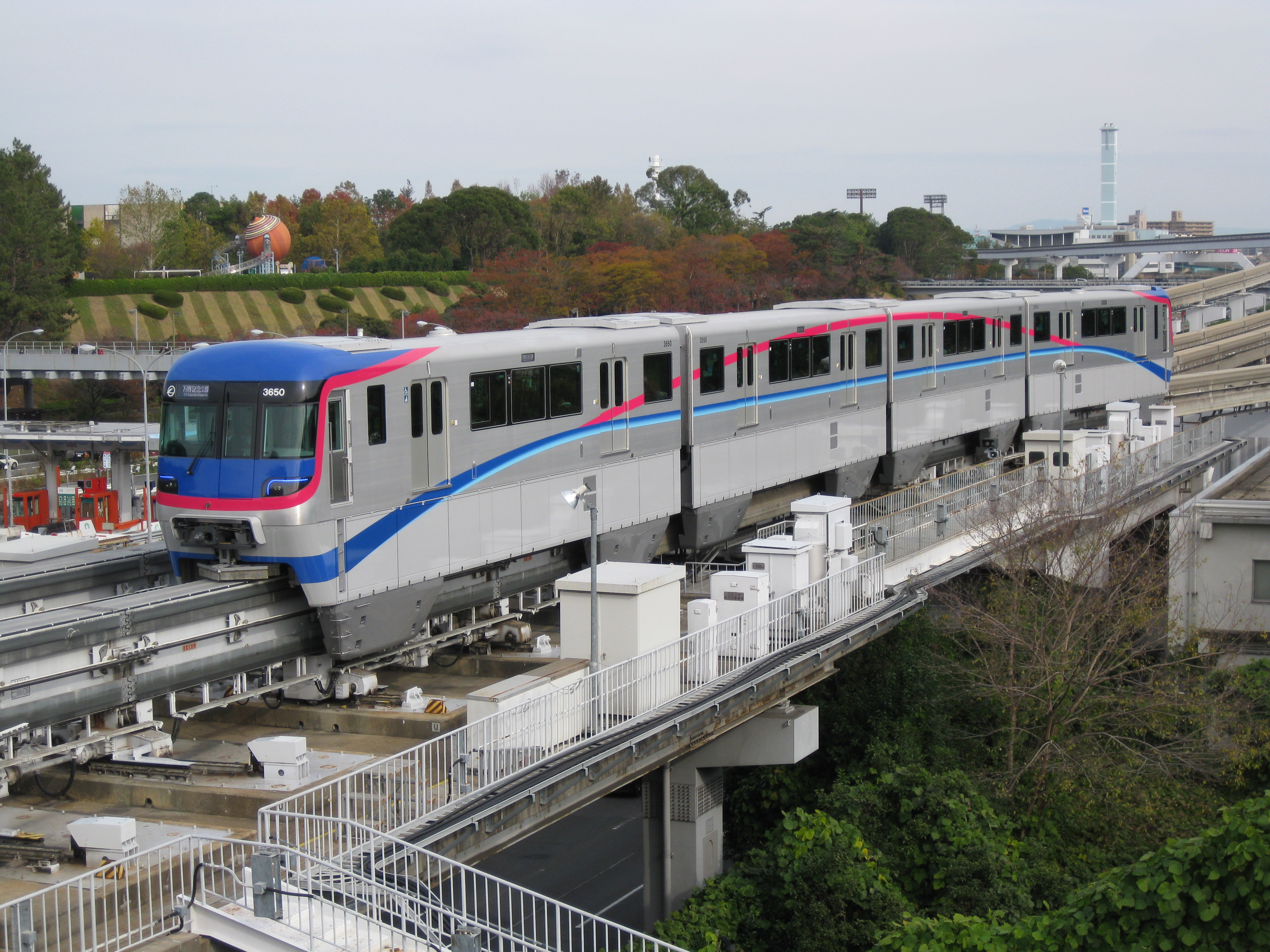
- Osaka Monorail 3000 Series

Overview
- Locale: Osaka
- Termini: Osaka Airport Station; Kadoma-shi Station
- Stations: 14 (In operation)

Service
- Type: Monorail
- Operator: Osaka Monorail

Technical
- Line length: 21.2 km (13.2 mi)
- Electrification: 1,500 V DC

Osaka Monorail Main Line (大阪モノレール線, Ōsaka Monorēru sen) is a monorail route of the Osaka Monorail which connects Osaka Airport Station in Toyonaka, Osaka Prefecture, Senri-Chūō Station in Suita, Minami-Ibaraki Station in Ibaraki, Dainichi Station in Moriguchi, and Kadoma-shi Station in Kadoma.

== Overview ==
The Main Line runs on an elevated line between Osaka International Airport and Kadoma. It opened on 1 June 1990 between Senri-Chuo and Minami-Ibaraki stations. On 30 September 1994 it reached Shibahara-handai-mae Station, on 1 April 1997, Osaka Airport, and on 22 August 1997, its current eastern terminal at Kadoma-shi Station. It is 21.2 km (13.2 mi) long. A single-way trip over the entire Main Line takes about 36 minutes, and costs ¥550.

== Future ==
An 8.9 km (5.5 mi), five-station extension from Kadoma to Uryudo was originally planned to open in 2029. This extension's completion was pushed back to 2033 due to construction delays caused by weak foundations. The projected total cost of the constructions were also raised by 80% due to rising labor and material costs.

== Station list ==
The entire line is in Osaka.

| Status | Station number | Station | Japanese | Distance | Transfers | Location |
|---|---|---|---|---|---|---|
| In operation | 11 | Osaka Airport Station | 大阪空港駅 | 0 km (0 mi) | | Toyonaka |
| In operation | 12 | Hotarugaike Station | 蛍池駅 | 1.4 km (0.87 mi) | Hankyu Railway Takarazuka Line | Toyonaka |
| In operation | 13 | Shibahara-handai-mae Station | 柴原阪大前駅 | 3.1 km (1.9 mi) | | Toyonaka |
| In operation | 14 | Shōji Station | 少路駅 | 4.8 km (3.0 mi) | | Toyonaka |
| In operation | 15 | Senri-Chūō Station | 千里中央駅 | 6.6 km (4.1 mi) | Kita-Osaka Kyuko Railway | Toyonaka |
| In operation | 16 | Yamada Station | 山田駅 | 8.5 km (5.3 mi) | Hankyu Railway Senri Line | Suita |
| In operation | 17 | Bampaku-Kinen-Koen Station | 万博記念公園駅 | 9.9 km (6.2 mi) | Osaka Monorail Saito Line | Suita |
| In operation | 18 | Unobe Station | 宇野辺駅 | 12.1 km (7.5 mi) | | Ibaraki |
| In operation | 19 | Minami-Ibaraki Station | 南茨木駅 | 13.3 km (8.3 mi) | Hankyu Railway Kyoto Line | Ibaraki |
| In operation | 20 | Sawaragi Station | 沢良宜駅 | 14.5 km (9.0 mi) | | Ibaraki |
| In operation | 21 | Settsu Station | 摂津駅 | 16.0 km (9.9 mi) | | Settsu |
| In operation | 22 | Minami-Settsu Station | 南摂津駅 | 17.8 km (11.1 mi) | | Settsu |
| In operation | 23 | Dainichi Station | 大日駅 | 19.9 km (12.4 mi) | Osaka Metro Tanimachi Line | Moriguchi |
| In operation | 24 | Kadoma-shi Station | 門真市駅 | 21.2 km (13.2 mi) | Keihan Electric Railway Keihan Main Line | Kadoma |
| Planned (2033) | 25 | Matsuocho Station (Note: Tentative name.) (Note: Added in 2021 at the request of Kadoma City and Moriguchi City.) | 松生町駅（仮称） | | | Kadoma |
| Planned (2033) | 26 | Kadoma-minami Station | 門真南駅（仮称） | | Osaka Metro Nagahori Tsurumi-ryokuchi Line | Kadoma |
| Planned (2033) | 27 | Kōnoikeshinden Station | 鴻池新田駅（仮称） | | JR West Katamachi Line | Higashiosaka |
| Planned (2033) | 28 | Aramoto Station | 荒本駅（仮称） | | Kintetsu Keihanna Line | Higashiosaka |
| Planned (2033) | 29 | Uryūdō Station | 瓜生堂駅（仮称） | | Kintetsu Nara Line (Note: New station to be built.) | Higashiosaka |
