= Hotarugaike Station =

Railway and monorail station in Toyonaka, Osaka Prefecture, Japan

Hotarugaike Station 蛍池駅
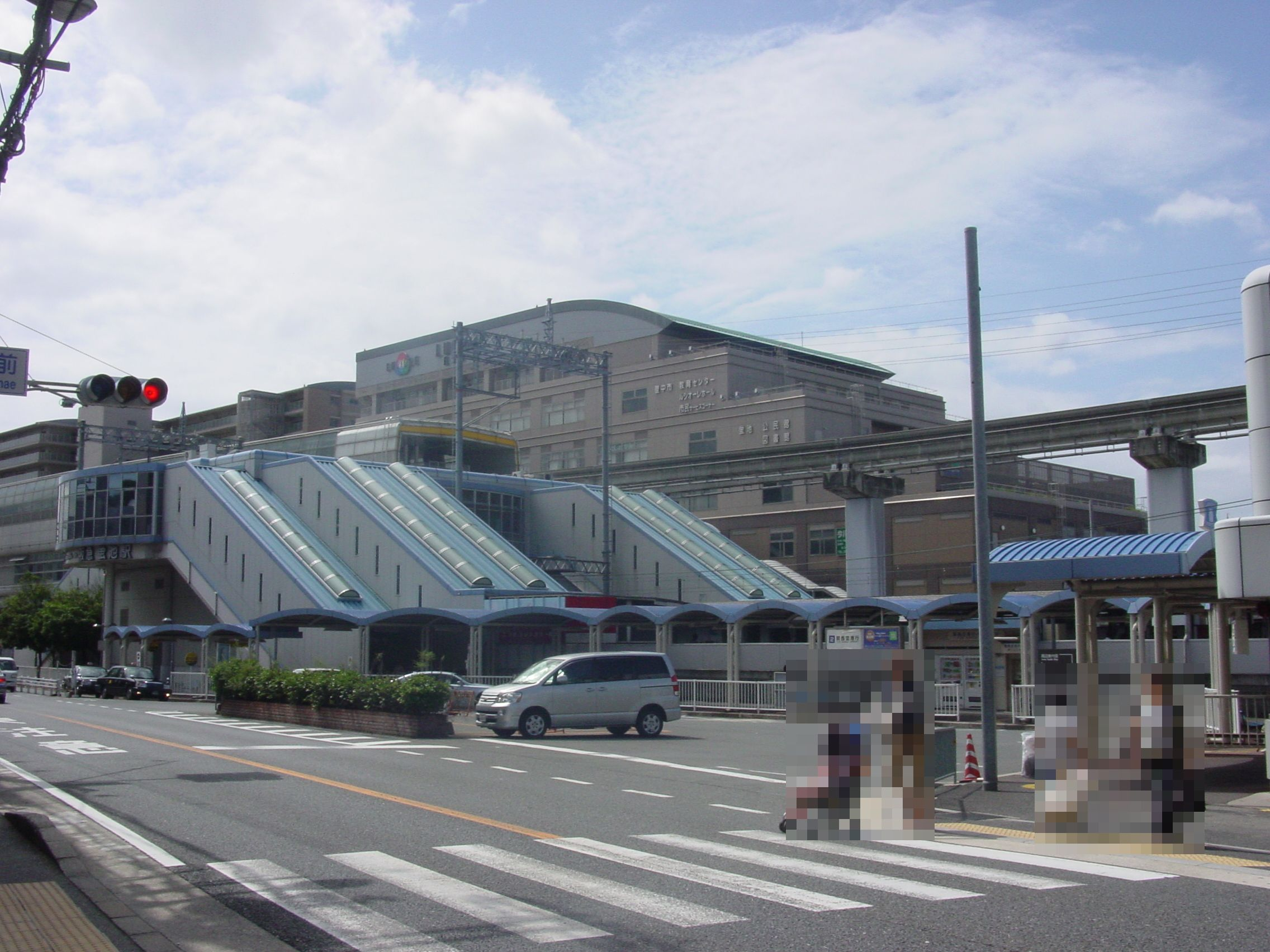
- Hankyu Hotarugaike Station

General information
- Location: 1-5 Hotarugaike Higashimachi, Toyonaka-shi, Osaka-fu
- Coordinates: 34°47′40.52″N 135°26′57.45″E
- Operator: Hankyu Railway; Osaka Monorail
- Lines: ■ Hankyu Takarazuka Line; ■ Osaka Monorail Main Line
- Distance: 11.9 km (7.4 miles) from Osaka-umeda
- Platforms: 2 side + 1 island platform
- Tracks: 2

Construction
- Accessible: yes

Other information
- Status: Staffed
- Station code: HK-47 (Hankyu); 12 (Osaka Monorail)
- Website: Official website

History
- Opened: April 25, 1910

Passengers
- FY2019: 44,426 daily (Hankyu); 29,900 (Osaka Monorail)

Services
Preceding station	Hankyu Railway	Following station
Toyonaka HK-46 towards Osaka-umeda	Takarazuka Main Line Local Express	Ishibashi handai-mae HK-48 towards Takarazuka
Toyonaka HK-46 towards Osaka-umeda	Takarazuka Main Line Semi-Express	Ishibashi handai-mae HK-48 One-way operation
Location
- Location within Osaka Prefecture Location within Japan

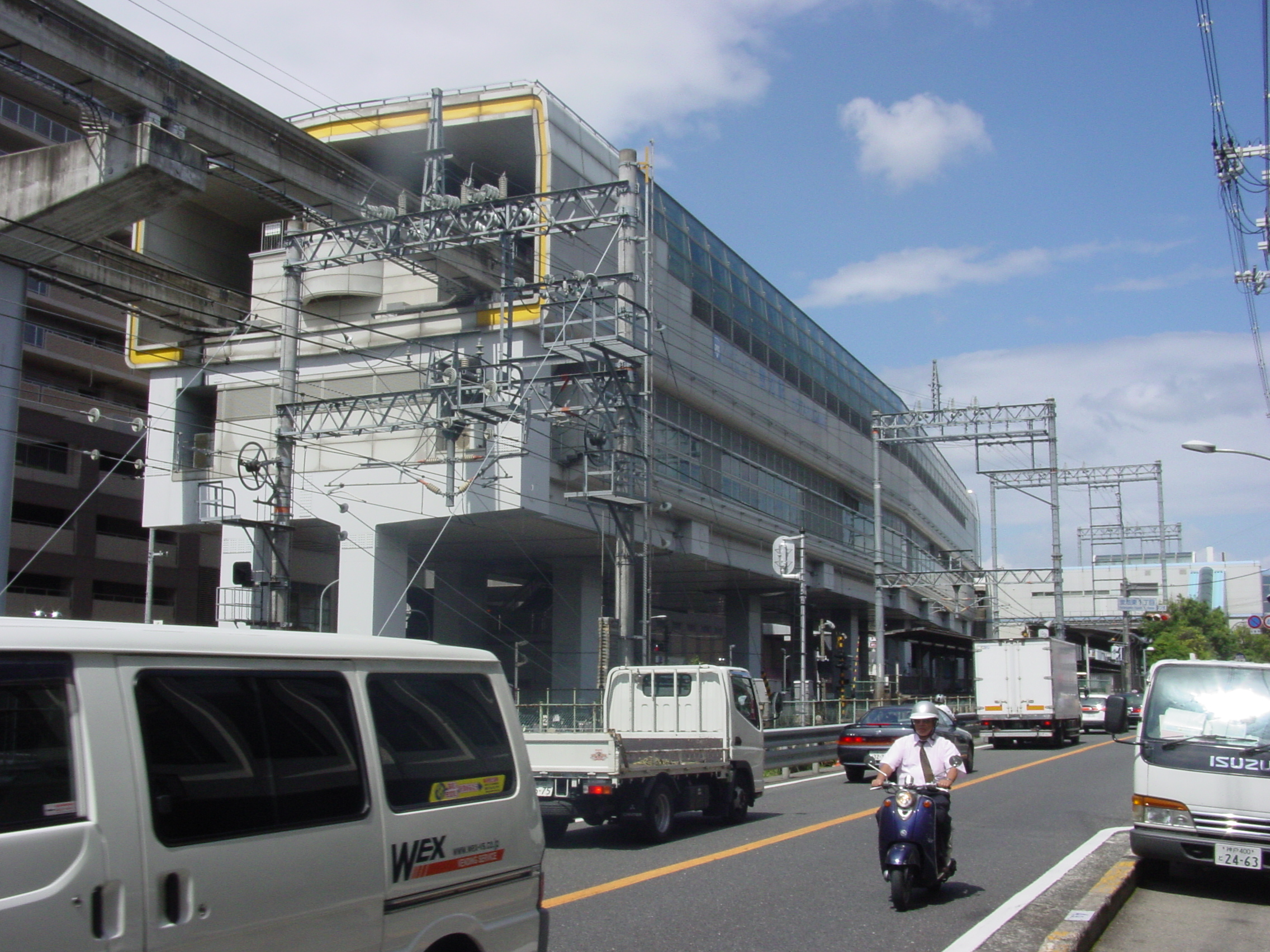
Osaka Monorail Hotarugaike Station

Hotarugaike Station (蛍池駅, Hotarugaike-eki) is a junction passenger railway station located in the city of Toyonaka, Osaka Prefecture, Japan. It is operated by the private transportation company Hankyu Railway and by the Osaka Monorail.

== Lines ==
Hotarugaike Station is served by the Hankyu Takarazuka Line, and is located 11.9 kilometers from the terminus of the line at Osaka-umeda. It is also served by the Osaka Monorail Main Line and is 1.4 kilometers from the terminus of that line at Itami Airport.

== Layout ==
The Hankyu portion of the station consists of two opposed side platforms connected by an elevated station building. The Osaka Monorail portion of the station consists of one elevated island platform on the third story of the station building. The ticket gate and concourse are on the 2nd floor, and are connected at this same level with the Hankyu portion of the station.

=== Platforms ===
1	■ Takarazuka Line	for Takarazuka
2	■ Takarazuka Line	for Osaka-umeda

1	■ Osaka Monorail Main Line	for Senri-Chūō, Bampaku-kinen-kōen (Expo '70 Commemoration Park), Minami-Ibaraki and Kadoma-shi
2	■ Osaka Monorail Main Line	to Osaka Airport

== Adjacent stations ==
«	Service	»
Osaka Monorail Main Line (12)
Osaka Airport (11)	-	Shibahara-handai-mae (13)

== History ==
Hotarugaike Station opened on 25 April 1910. The current station building was completed in 1994. Station numbering was introduced to all Hankyu stations on 21 December 2013 with this station being designated as station number HK-47.

The platforms on the Osaka Monorail Main Line opened on 30 September 1994 as part of a 7.9 km (4.9 mi) extension west from Senri-Chūō Station.

== Passenger statistics ==
In fiscal 2019, the Hankyu station was used by an average of 44,426 passengers daily and the Osaka Monorail portion by 29,900 passengers daily.

== Surrounding area ==
- Hotarugaike Central Market
- National Hospital Organization Osaka Toneyama Medical Center
- Osaka Prefectural Toneyama Support School
- Toyonaka Municipal Hotarugaike Elementary School

== See also ==
- List of railway stations in Japan
