= Osaka Airport Station =

Railway and monorail station in Toyonaka, Osaka Prefecture, Japan

Osaka Airport Station 大阪空港駅
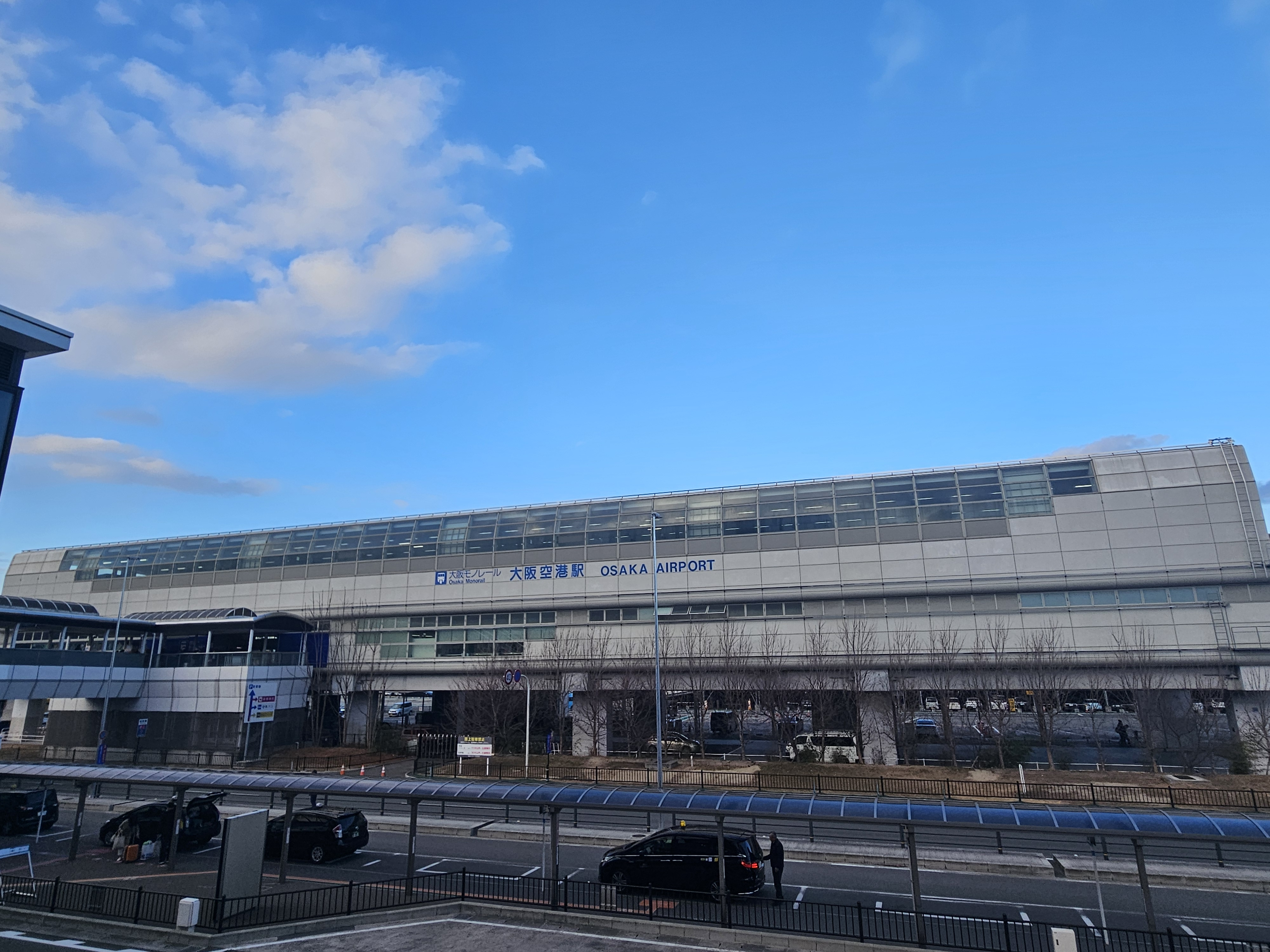
- Station building in 2025

General information
- Location: Japan
- Coordinates: 34°47′44″N 135°26′30″E
- Operator: Osaka Monorail
- Line: Main Line
- Platforms: 1
- Tracks: 2

Construction
- Structure type: Elevated
- Accessible: Yes

Other information
- Station code: 11

History
- Opened: 1 April 1997
Location

Osaka Airport Station (大阪空港駅, Ōsaka-Kūkō Eki) is a Japanese monorail station of Osaka Monorail in Toyonaka, Osaka Prefecture, Japan.

== Lines ==
- Osaka Monorail Main Line

== Layout ==
There is an island platform and two tracks elevated. The platform is sealed in with glass walls and doors.

1	■ Main Line	for Kadomashi
2	■ Main Line	for Kadomashi

== History ==
The station opened on 1 April 1997.

== Passenger statistics ==
In fiscal year 2025, the Osaka Airport Station was used by an average of 17,334 passengers daily.

== Surrounding area ==
- Itami Airport
- Toyoko Inn Hotel
