= Toyonaka =

Toyonaka 豊中市
- Core city
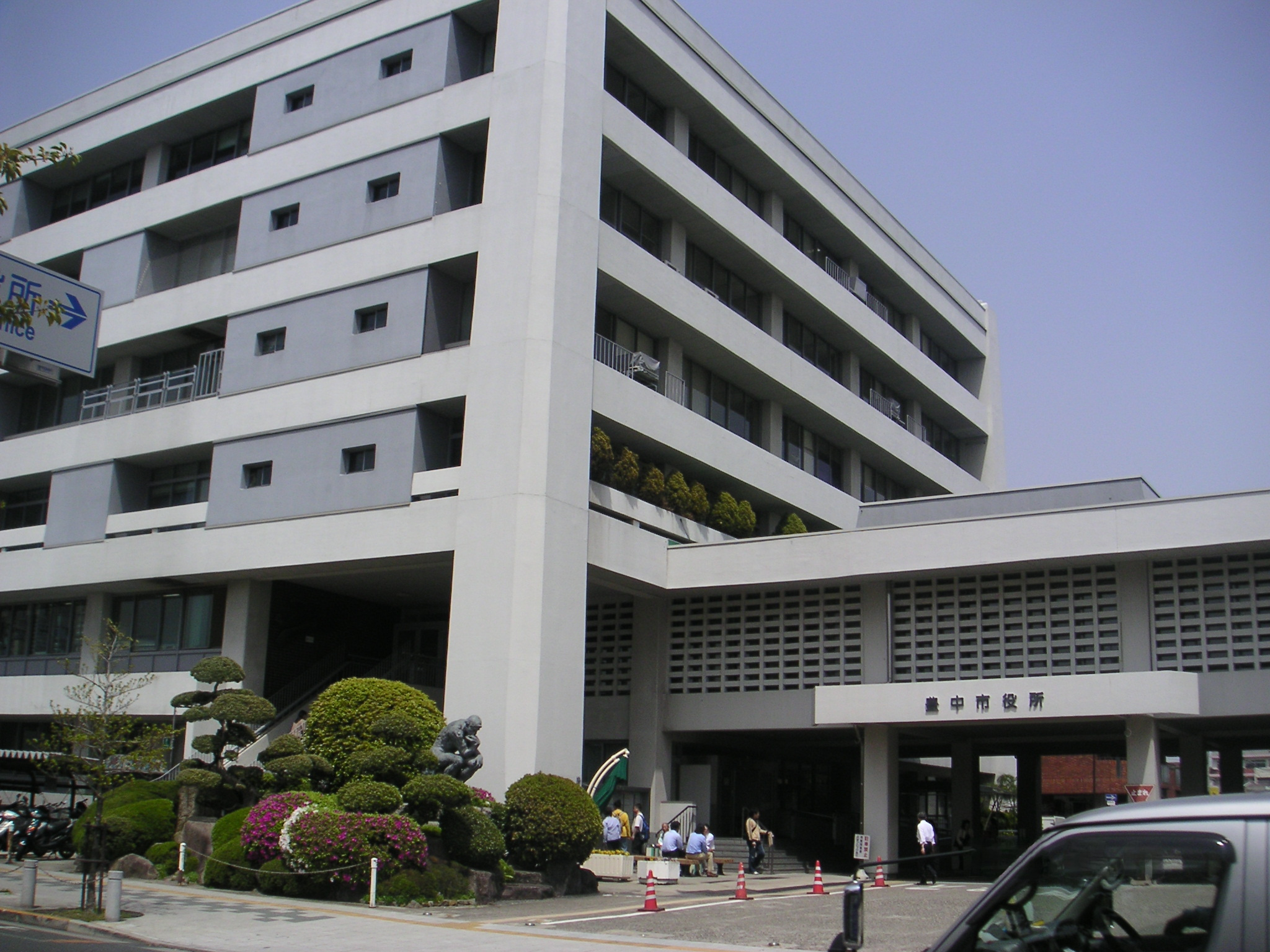
- Toyonaka City Hall

- Flag Seal
- Location of Toyonaka in Osaka Prefecture

- Location in Japan
- Coordinates: 34°47′N 135°28′E
- Country: Japan
- Region: Kansai
- Prefecture: Osaka
- First official recorded: 4 th century BC (official estimated)
- City settled: October 15, 1936

Government
  - Mayor: Shigeki Osanai (長内繁樹) - from May 2018

Area
  - Total: 36.39 km^{2} (14.05 sq mi)

Population (May 1, 2023)
  - Total: 399,263
  - Density: 10,970/km^{2} (28,420/sq mi)
- Time zone: UTC+09:00 (JST)
- City hall address: 3-1-1 Nakasakurazuka, Toyonaka-shi, Osaka-fu 561-8501
- Climate: Cfa
- Website: Official website
- Symbols
- Flower: Rose
- Tree: Sweet Osmanthus

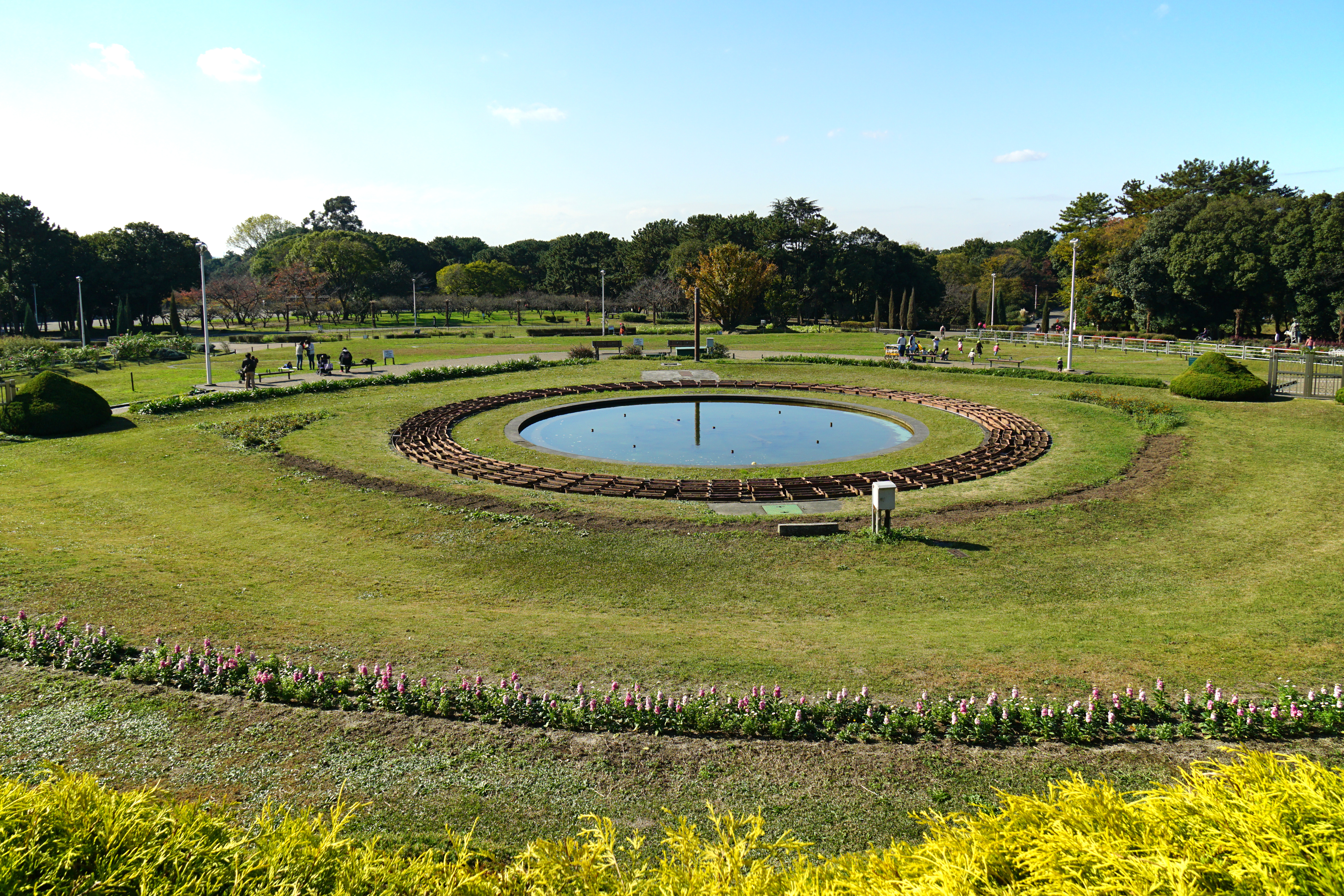
Hattori Ryokuchi Park

Toyonaka (豊中市, Toyonaka-shi; Japanese pronunciation: [tò̞.jó̞.nä́.kä́(.ɕì)]) is a city in Osaka Prefecture, Japan. As of 1 May 2023, the city had an estimated population of 399,263 in 179651 households and a population density of 5700 persons per km^{2}. The total area of the city is 36.39 square kilometres (14.05 sq mi). It is a suburban city of Osaka City and a part of the Kyoto-Osaka-Kobe metropolitan area.

== Geography ==
Toyonaka is located in northern Osaka Prefecture. Topographically, the northern part is high (facing the Senri Hills), and the southern part is low (facing the Osaka Plain). A gently sloping terrace of 20 to 50 meters above sea level distributed on the western edge of the city is called the Toyonaka Plateau, which forms the center of the urban area. With the exception of the buffered green zone around Osaka International Airport, the area of Toyonaka is almost urbanized.

=== Neighboring municipalities ===
Hyōgo Prefecture

- Amagasaki
- Itami

Osaka Prefecture

- Ikeda
- Minoh
- Suita
- Yodogawa-ku

=== Demographics ===
Historical population
Year	Pop.	±%
1950	102,304	—
1955	127,678	+24.8%
1960	199,065	+55.9%
1965	291,936	+46.7%
1970	368,498	+26.2%
1975	398,384	+8.1%
1980	403,174	+1.2%
1985	413,213	+2.5%
1990	409,837	−0.8%
1995	398,908	−2.7%
2000	391,726	−1.8%
2005	386,623	−1.3%
2010	389,359	+0.7%
2015	395,479	+1.6%
2020	401,558	+1.5%
Toyonaka population statistics

== Climate ==
Toyonaka has a humid subtropical climate (Köppen Cfa) characterized by warm summers and cool winters with light to no snowfall. The average annual temperature in Toyonaka is 16.4 °C (61.5 °F). The average annual rainfall is 1,326.3 mm (52.22 in) with July as the wettest month. The temperatures are highest on average in August, at around 28.7 °C (83.7 °F), and lowest in January, at around 5.1 °C (41.2 °F).

Climate data for Toyonaka (1991−2020 normals, extremes 1977−present)
Month	Jan	Feb	Mar	Apr	May	Jun	Jul	Aug	Sep	Oct	Nov	Dec	Year
Record high °C (°F)	18.8 (65.8)	22.2 (72.0)	23.4 (74.1)	30.8 (87.4)	33.2 (91.8)	37.9 (100.2)	39.5 (103.1)	39.9 (103.8)	37.3 (99.1)	33.9 (93.0)	26.3 (79.3)	23.7 (74.7)	39.9 (103.8)
Mean daily maximum °C (°F)	9.6 (49.3)	10.4 (50.7)	14.1 (57.4)	19.9 (67.8)	25.0 (77.0)	28.1 (82.6)	31.8 (89.2)	33.8 (92.8)	29.6 (85.3)	23.8 (74.8)	17.8 (64.0)	12.1 (53.8)	21.3 (70.4)
Daily mean °C (°F)	5.1 (41.2)	5.7 (42.3)	9.1 (48.4)	14.5 (58.1)	19.5 (67.1)	23.3 (73.9)	27.4 (81.3)	28.7 (83.7)	24.7 (76.5)	18.7 (65.7)	12.7 (54.9)	7.4 (45.3)	16.4 (61.5)
Mean daily minimum °C (°F)	0.7 (33.3)	1.0 (33.8)	4.0 (39.2)	9.1 (48.4)	14.3 (57.7)	19.3 (66.7)	23.8 (74.8)	24.8 (76.6)	20.7 (69.3)	14.2 (57.6)	7.8 (46.0)	2.8 (37.0)	11.9 (53.4)
Record low °C (°F)	−5.8 (21.6)	−6.3 (20.7)	−3.7 (25.3)	−0.4 (31.3)	4.6 (40.3)	9.9 (49.8)	15.7 (60.3)	17.3 (63.1)	10.8 (51.4)	3.9 (39.0)	0.0 (32.0)	−4.5 (23.9)	−6.3 (20.7)
Average precipitation mm (inches)	44.4 (1.75)	59.3 (2.33)	97.1 (3.82)	98.2 (3.87)	137.4 (5.41)	180.1 (7.09)	182.6 (7.19)	122.8 (4.83)	159.2 (6.27)	127.1 (5.00)	68.5 (2.70)	49.6 (1.95)	1,326.3 (52.22)
Average precipitation days (≥ 1.0 mm)	5.4	6.2	9.2	8.8	9.7	11.1	10.6	7.2	9.9	8.5	5.8	6.0	98.4
Source: Japan Meteorological Agency

== History ==
The area of Toyonaka was part of ancient Settsu Province. The village of Toyonaka was established with the creation of the modern municipalities system on April 1, 1889. It was raised to town status on April 1, 1927, and to city status on October 15, 1936. On April 1, 2001, Toyonaka was designated a Special city with increased local autonomy. It was further promoted to a core city on April 1, 2012.

== Government ==
Toyonaka has a mayor-council form of government with a directly elected mayor and a unicameral city council of 34 members. Toyonaka contributes four members to the Osaka Prefectural Assembly. In terms of national politics, the city is part of Osaka 8th district of the lower house of the Diet of Japan.

== Economy ==
Toyonaka is a regional commercial center and distribution hub for Osaka. Due to its proximity to the Osaka metropolitan area, it is also a commuter town, and includes Senri New Town and other large-scale housing developments. Manufacturing industry is concentrated in the south. Economically, the city has a long-standing relationship with Hankyu Corporation. Therefore, many of the core companies of the Hankyu and Hanshin group are headquartered in Toyonaka.

== Education ==
Toyonaka has 41 public elementary schools and 17 public middle schools operated by the city government and five public high school operated by the Osaka Prefectural Department of Education. There are also one private elementary school, one private middle school and four private high schools. The prefecture also operates two special education schools for the handicapped. The Osaka College of Music is located in Toyonaka.

== Transportation ==
=== Airports ===
Osaka International Airport is partially located in Toyonaka including its terminal, although it is more commonly associated with the city of Itami.

=== Railway ===
Kita-Osaka Kyūkō Railway

- Senri-Chūō - Momoyamadai - Ryokuchi-kōen

Hankyu Railway Hankyu Takarazuka Line

- Shōnai - Hattori-tenjin - Sone - Okamachi - Toyonaka - Hotarugaike

Osaka Monorail - Main Line

- Osaka Airport - Hotarugaike - Shibahara-handai-mae - Shōji - Senri-Chūō

=== Highway ===
- Chūgoku Expressway
- Meishin Expressway
- Hanshin Expressway Route 11 Ikeda Route
- National Route 171
- National Route 176
- National Route 423
- National Route 479

== Sister cities ==
- San Mateo, California, United States

The Consulate-General of Russia in Osaka is located in Toyonaka.

== Local attractions ==
- Harada Shrine. Founded during the reign of the Emperor Tenmu (672–686), the wooden shrine was rebuilt in 1652 and again in 1781. An important cultural property, it is known for its copse of camphor trees and it is the site of the popular Lion Festival each October.
- Hattori Ryokuchi Arboretum
- Hattori Ryokuchi Park
- Open-Air Museum of Old Japanese Farm Houses
- Osaka University

== Notable people from Toyonaka ==
- Shōzō Endō, comedian
- Takashi Fujii, television performer
- Mai Hosho, actress
- Tak Matsumoto, musician and guitarist (B'z)
- Yoshihiro Murai, governor of Miyagi prefecture (2005–present)
- Yukie Nishimura, pianist and composer
- Masashi Oguro, soccer player
- Panchan Rina, kickboxer
- Unagi Sayaka, professional wrestler
- Kaoru Shintani, manga artist
- Sanshiro Takagi, professional wrestler
- Naoki Tanaka, comedian
- Naoki Tanizaki, professional wrestler
- Osamu Tezuka, manga artist and animator
- Hitomi Yaida, singer and songwriter
- Yoji Yamada, film director
- Toshiya Kuge, student and victim of the September 11 attacks
