= Senri-Chūō Station =

Metro and monorail station in Toyonaka, Osaka Prefecture, Japan

Coordinates: 34°48′37″N 135°29′43″E

Senri-Chūō 千里中央
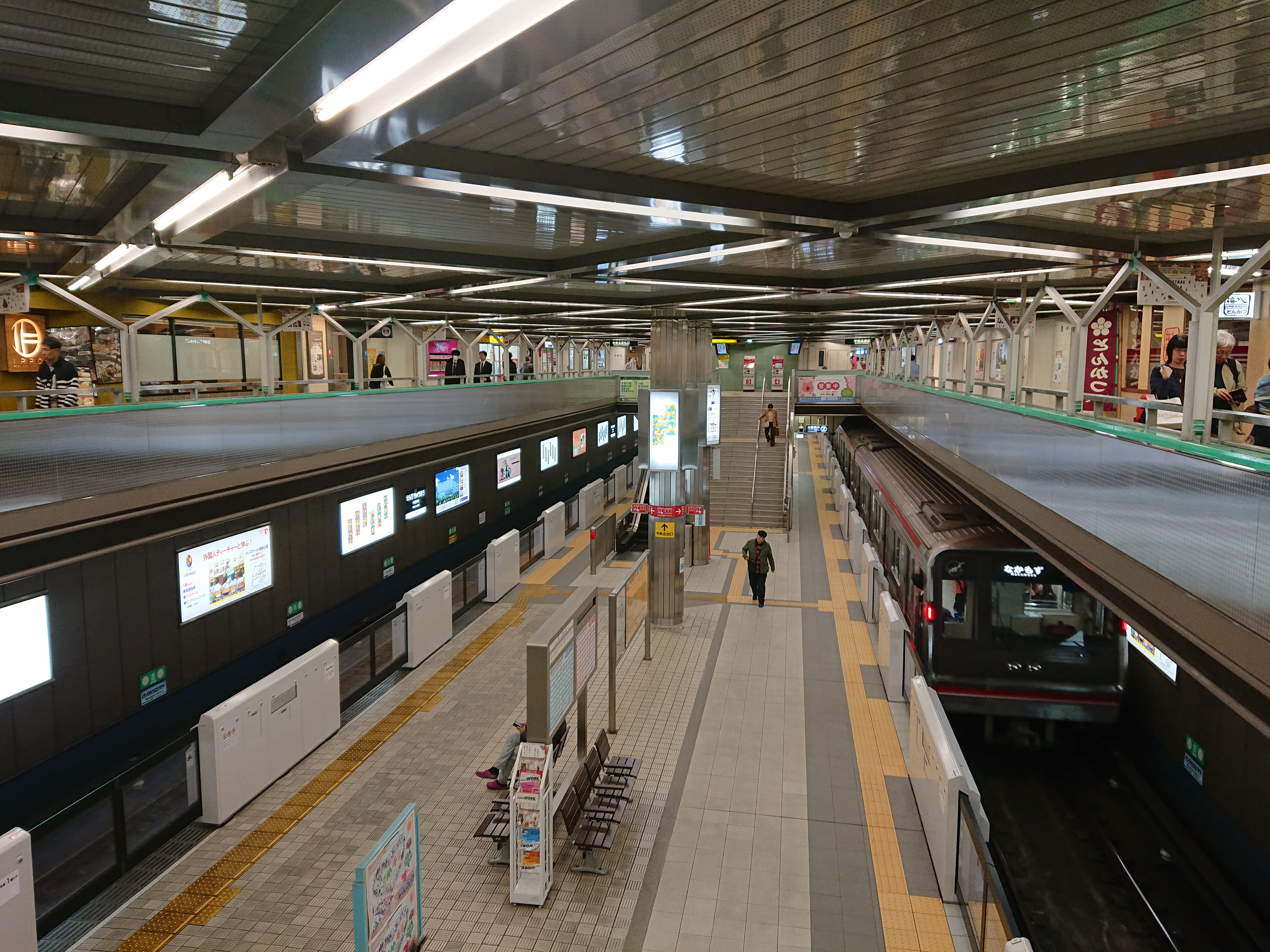
- Platform of the Namboku Line, Kita-Osaka Kyuko Railway in Senri-Chūō Station.

General information
- Location: Shinsenri Higashimachi, Toyonaka, Osaka （大阪府豊中市新千里東町一丁目5-4） Japan
- Operator: Kita-Osaka Kyūkō Railway; Osaka Monorail
- Lines: Kitakyū Namboku Line; Osaka Monorail Main Line
- Tracks: 2 (Namboku Line); 2 (Osaka Monorail)

Construction
- Structure type: Underground (Namboku Line); Elevated (Osaka Monorail)
- Accessible: Yes

Other information
- Station code: M08, 15
- Website: Official website

History
- Opened: 14 September 1970

Services
| Preceding station | Kita-Osaka Kyuko Railway | Following station |
|---|---|---|
| Minoh-Semba Handai-mae M07 towards Minoh-kayano | Namboku Line | Momoyamadai M09 towards Esaka |
Location

Senri-Chūō Station (千里中央駅, Senri-Chūō-eki) is a railway station on the Kita-Osaka Kyuko Railway (which links directly into the Osaka Metro Midosuji Line) and Osaka Monorail located in the Senri New Town in Toyonaka, Osaka, Japan. It is also called "Senchū (せんちゅう)".

== Lines ==
- Kita-Osaka Kyuko Railway Namboku Line (Station Number: M08)
- Osaka Monorail Main Line (Station Number: 15)

== Kita-Osaka Kyuko Railway Namboku Line ==
=== Layout ===
- There is an island platform on the second basement serving two tracks

| 1 | ■ Namboku Line | for Esaka and (Osaka Metro Midosuji Line) Nakamozu |
| 2 | ■ Namboku Line | to Minoh-Kayano |

== Osaka Monorail Main Line ==
=== Layout ===
- There is an elevated island platform serving two lines.

| 1 | ■ Main Line | for Bampaku-kinen-koen (Expo '70 Commemoration Park), Minami-Ibaraki, Kadomashi and Saito-nishi |
| 2 | ■ Main Line | for Hotarugaike and Osaka International Airport |

== History ==
The Kita-Osaka Kyuko Railway began service on 24 February 1970 to connect Esaka Station to the site of Expo '70. A temporary station opened at Senri-Chuo at this time, on what is now the inbound side of the Chugoku Expressway near the Senri Hankyu Hotel. A permanent underground station opened on 14 September 1970 when the rail link to the Expo site was closed, making Senri-Chuo the northern terminus of the line. An extension north of the station to Minoh-Kayano opened on 23 March 2024.

The Osaka Monorail station opened on 1 June 1990, coinciding with the opening of the first phase of the Osaka Monorail Line from Senri-Chuo to Minami-Ibaraki.

== Surroundings ==
- Hankyu Oasis
- Senchu Pal
- Senri Hankyu
- Senri Daimaru Plaza
- Yamada Denki LABI Senri
- Yomiuri Bunka Center
- Senri Hankyu Hotel
- Bus stops for Hankyu Bus Co., Ltd.

== Stations next to Senri-Chūō ==
| « | Service | » |
Osaka Monorail Main Line (15)
| Shoji (14) | - | Yamada (16) |
