= Minami-Ibaraki Station =

Railway station in Ibaraki, Osaka Prefecture, Japan

Minami-Ibaraki Station 南茨木駅
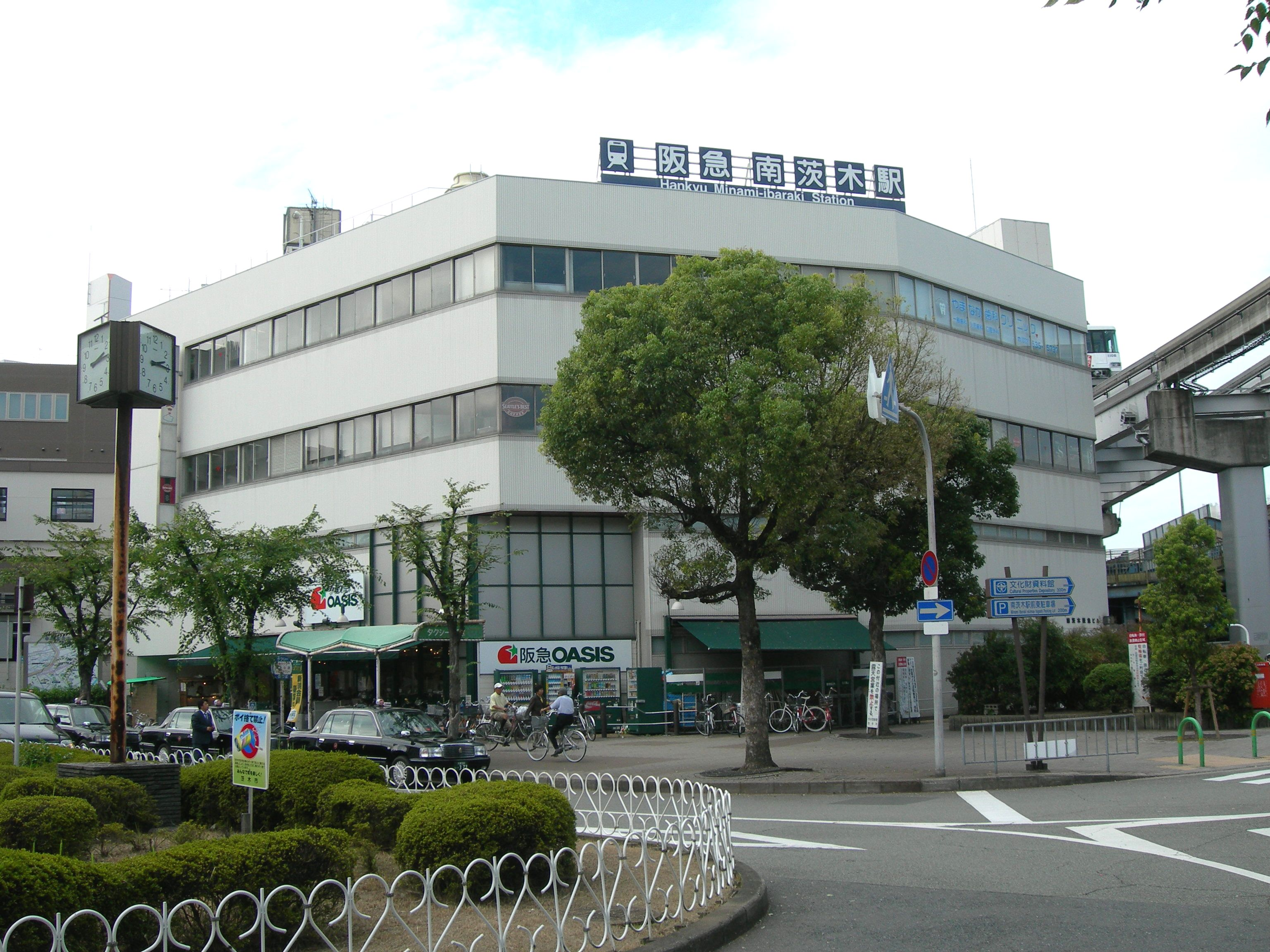
- Hankyu Minami-Ibaraki Station, August 2009

General information
- Location: 2-6-14 Tenno, Ibaraki-shi, Osaka-fu; Japan
- Coordinates: 34°48′9.54″N 135°33′55.07″E
- Operator: Hankyu Railway; Osaka Monorail
- Lines: ■ Hankyu Kyoto Line; ■ Osaka Monorail Main Line
- Distance: 12.9 km (8.0 miles) from Jūsō
- Platforms: 2 side + 1 island platforms

Other information
- Status: Staffed
- Station code: HK-68 (Hankyu); 19 (Osaka Monorail)
- Website: Official website

History
- Opened: March 8, 1970

Passengers
- FY2019: 46,939 daily (Hankyu); 31,198 (Osaka Monorail)
Location
- Location within Osaka Prefecture Location within Japan

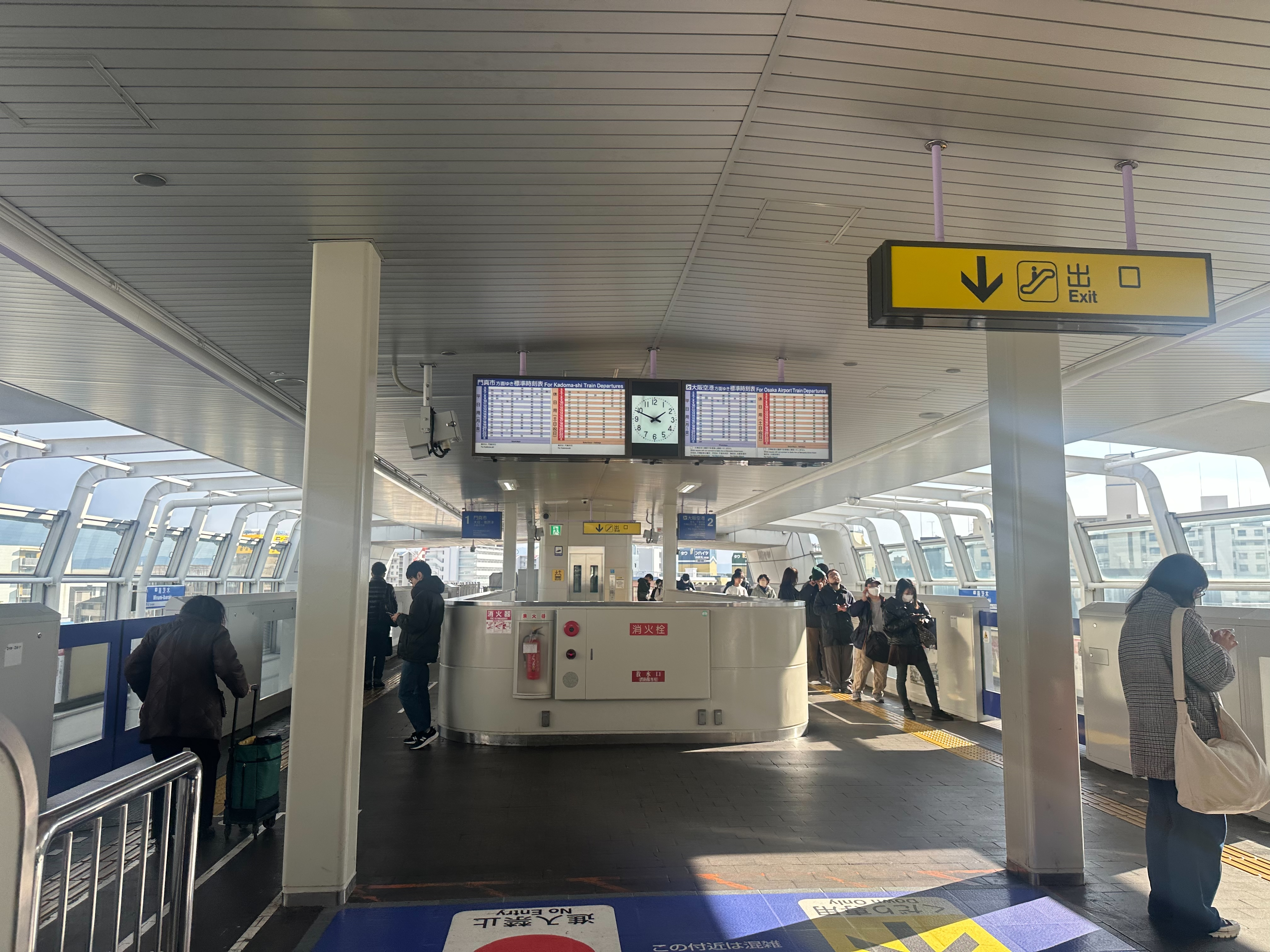
Main Line platform, December 2024

Minami-Ibaraki Station (南茨木駅, Minami-Ibaraki-eki), is a junction passenger railway station located in the city of Ibaraki, Osaka Prefecture, Japan. It is operated by the private transportation company Hankyu Railway and the Osaka Monorail.

== Lines ==
Minami-Ibaraki Station is served by the Hankyu Kyoto Line, and is located 12.9 kilometers from the terminus of the line at Jūsō and 15.3 kilometers from Osaka-umeda. It is also served by the Osaka Monorail Main Line and is 13.3 kilometers from the terminus of that line at Itami Airport.

== Layout ==
The Hankyu portion of the station consists of two opposed side platforms. The Osaka Monorail portion of the station consists of one elevated island platform.

=== Platforms ===
1	■ Kyoto Line	for Kyoto (Kawaramachi), Takatsuki-shi and Arashiyama
2	■ Kyoto Line	for Umeda, Tengachaya, Kita-Senri, Kobe, Takarazuka and Minoo

1	■ Main Line	for Dainichi and Kadomashi
2	■ Main Line	for Bampaku-kinen-kōen (Expo '70 Commemoration Park), Senri-Chūō, Hotarugaike and Osaka International Airport

== Adjacent stations ==
«	Service	»
Hankyu Kyoto Line (HK-68)
Settsu-shi (HK-67)	Local	Ibaraki-shi (HK-69)
Kami-Shinjō (HK-64)	Semi-Express	Ibaraki-shi (HK-69)
Kami-Shinjō (HK-64)	Express	Ibaraki-shi (HK-69)
Semi limited Express: Does not stop at this station
Limited Express: Does not stop at this station
Commuter Limited Express: Does not stop at this station
Rapid Limited Express "Kyo-Train", "Sagano", "Atago", "Togetsu", "Hozu": Does not stop at this station
Osaka Monorail Main Line (19)
Unobe (18)	-	Sawaragi (20)

== History ==
The station of the Hankyu line opened on 8 March 1970, and provided bus connection for passengers visiting Expo '70 (held March 15, 1970, through September 13, 1970). Unlike temporary Bankokuhaku Nishiguchi Station on the Senri Line (near present Yamada Station), which was open only during the Expo, Minami-Ibaraki Station was built as a permanent station.

The monorail station opened on 1 June 1990.

Station numbering was introduced to all Hankyu stations on 21 December 2013 with this station being designated as station number HK-68.

== Passenger statistics ==
In fiscal 2019, the Hankyu station was used by an average of 46,939 passengers daily and the Osaka Monorail portion was used by 31,198 passengers daily.

== Surrounding area ==
The area around the station is lined with condominiums developed by Hankyu Corporation.

- Ibaraki City Tenno Elementary School
- Ibaraki City Tenno Junior High School
- Ibaraki Municipal Higashi Nara Elementary School

== See also ==
- List of railway stations in Japan
