= Osaka Monorail =

Monorail system in Osaka Prefecture, Japan

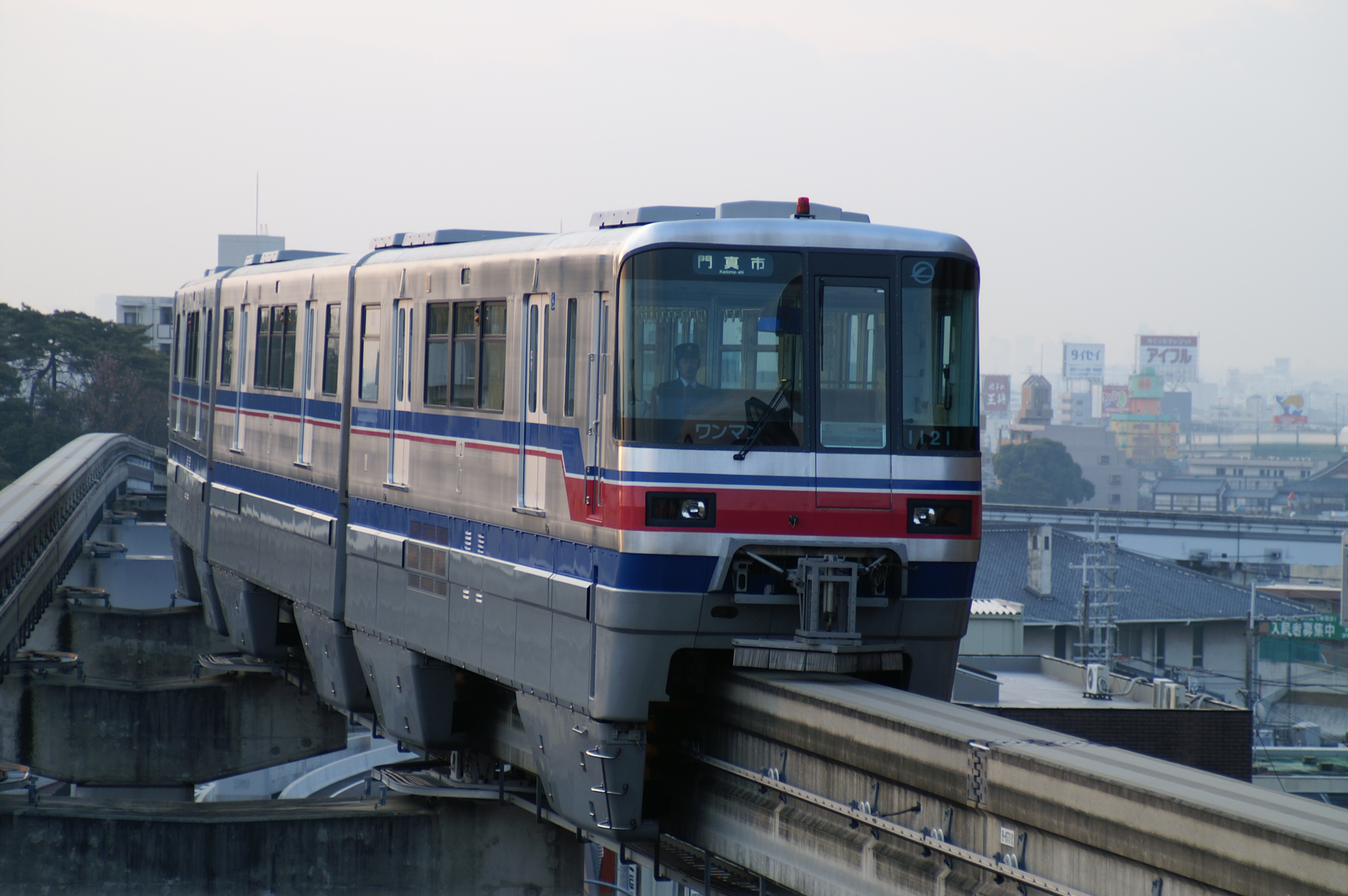
- Osaka Monorail 1000 series train at Hotarugaike Station

Overview
- Locale: Osaka Prefecture
- Transit type: Straddle-beam monorail (Alweg‑type)
- Number of lines: 2
- Number of stations: 18
- Daily ridership: 129,814 (JFY23)
- Annual ridership: 38,067,000 (2021)
- Website: www.osaka-monorail.co.jp

Operation
- Began operation: June 1, 1990; 36 years ago
- Operators: Osaka Monorail Co., Ltd.

Technical
- System length: 28.0 km (17.4 mi)
- Minimum radius of curvature: 100 m (330 ft)
- Electrification: Contact rails, 1,500 V DC
- Top speed: 75 km/h (47 mph)
System map
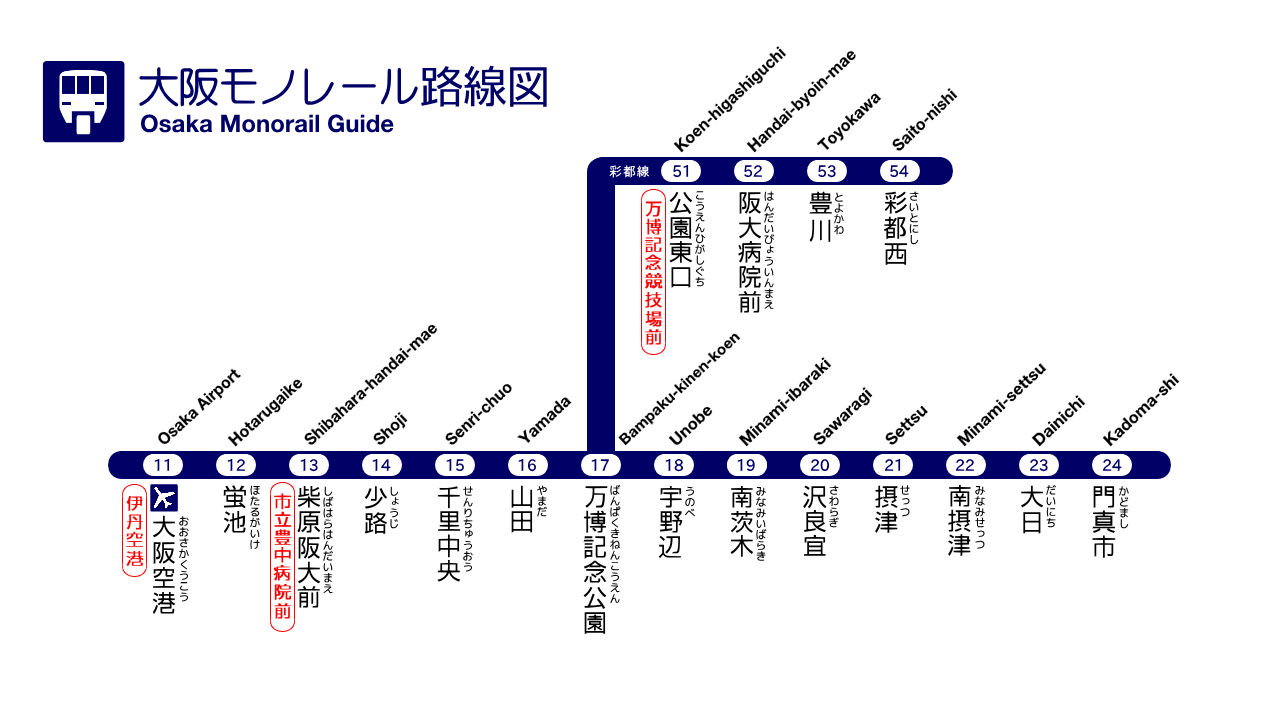

Osaka Monorail Co., Ltd.
- Native name: 大阪モノレール株式会社
- Romanized name: Ōsaka Monorēru kabushiki gaisha
- Type: Private KK
- Founded: Toyonaka, Osaka, Japan (December 15, 1980)
- Headquarters: 1-5, Shin-Senri-higashimachi Itchome, Toyonaka, Osaka, Japan
- Area served: northern Osaka Prefecture
- Owner: Osaka Prefectural Government (65.1%); Keihan Holdings Co. (2.7%); Hankyu Corporation (2.7%); Kintetsu Group Holdings Co. (2.7%); 7 municipalities and 17 companies, including Toyonaka municipal government (total 26.8%)
- Website: www.osaka-monorail.co.jp/company/

The Osaka Monorail (大阪モノレール, Ōsaka Monorēru) is a straddle-beam, Alweg-type monorail system in northern Osaka Prefecture, Japan, operated by the third-sector Osaka Monorail Co., Ltd. (Note: 大阪モノレール株式会社, Ōsaka Monorēru Kabushiki-gaisha) At 28 kilometres (17 mi) long, it is the longest monorail system in Japan. Its mainline forms an arc through the northern and eastern suburbs of Osaka, and is the only rail transit link to Itami Airport. It also links the three campuses of Osaka University.

IC cards can be used on the Osaka Monorail, including ICOCA and PiTaPa.

== Lines ==
Name	Termini		Opened	Completed	Length	Stations
Main Line	Osaka Airport	Kadoma-shi	1 June 1990	22 August 1997	21.2 km (13.2 mi)	14
Saito Line	Bampaku-kinen-kōen	Saito-nishi	1 October 1998	19 March 2007	6.8 km (4.2 mi)	5
Total					28.0	18

== Rolling stock ==
=== Current ===
- 1000 series
- 2000 series
- 3000 series
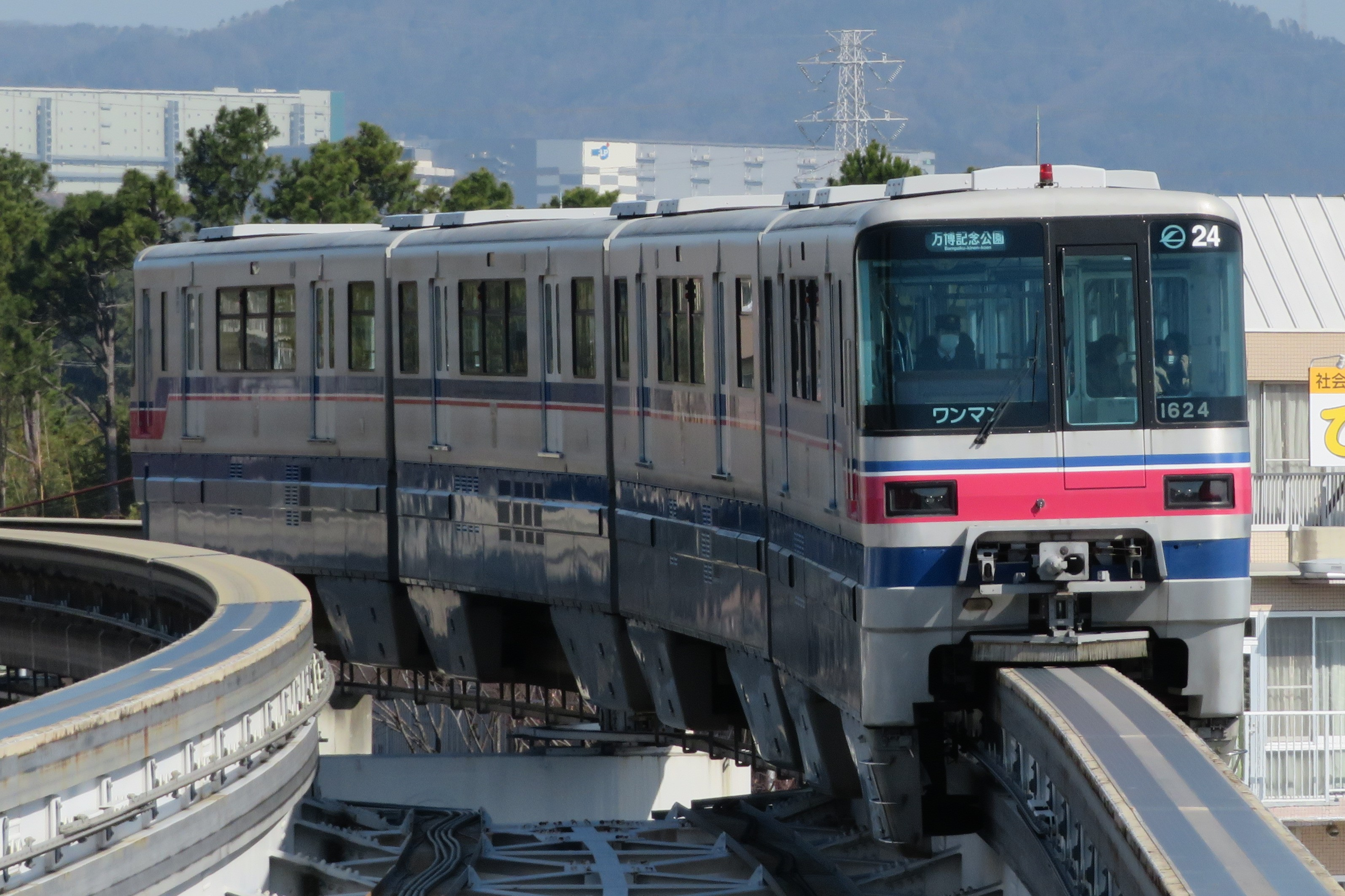
1000 series

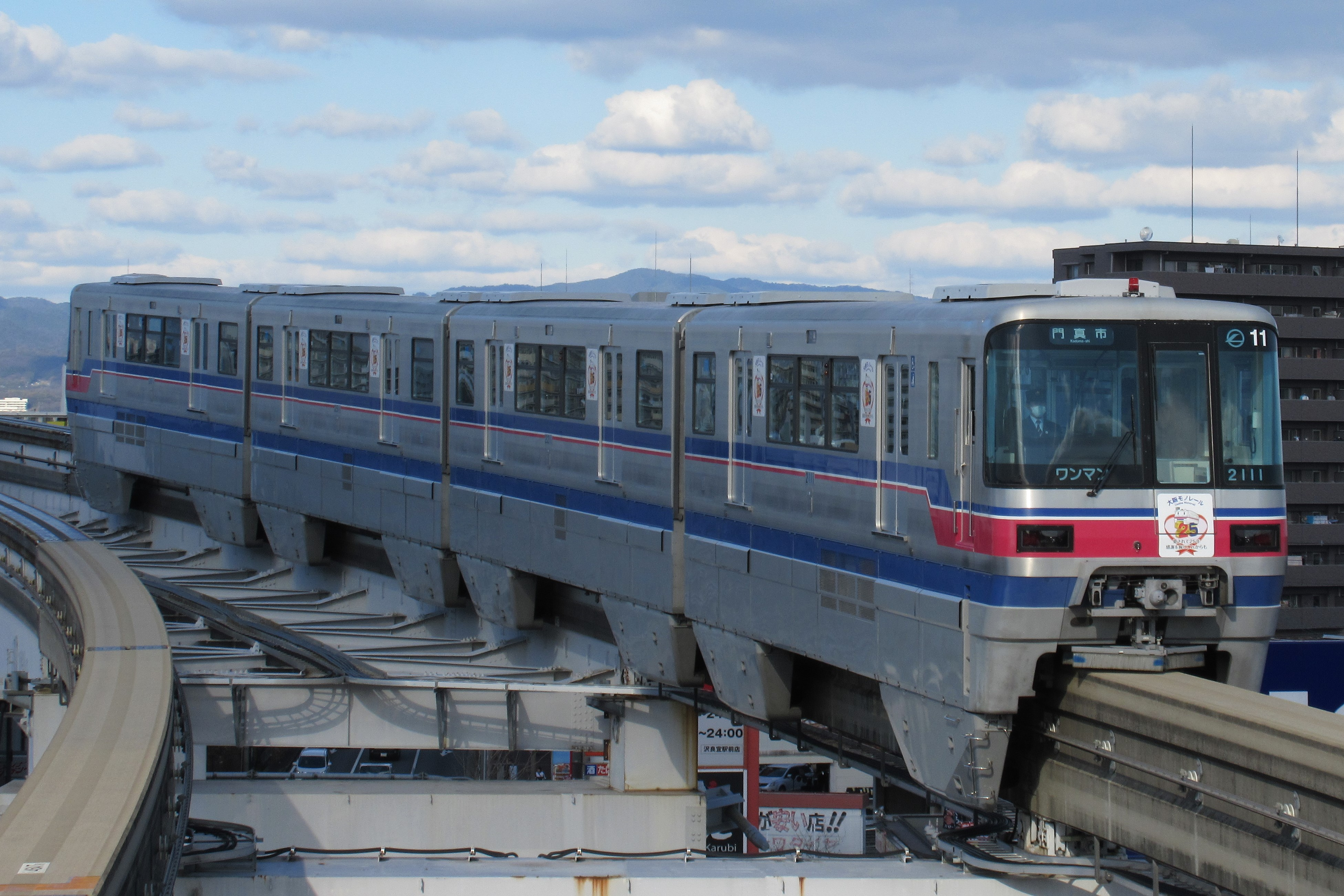
2000 series

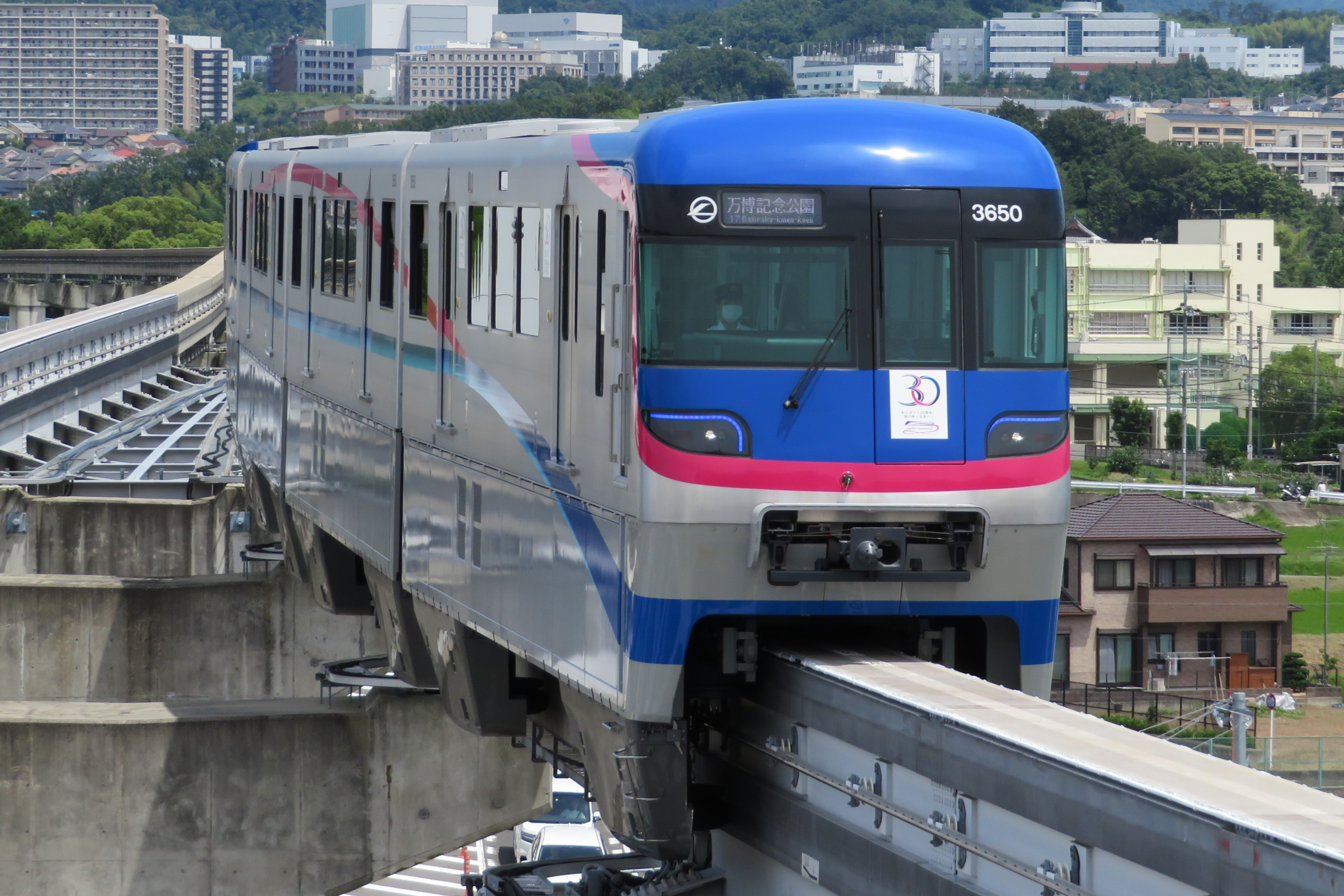
3000 series

== History ==
Osaka historically had a radial railway network that required traffic between outlying destinations to concentrate in the city center. The Urban Transportation Council recognized the need for a suburban ring route in 1971, when it recommended a route from Toyonaka to Sakai. An operating company was founded in 1980, rail laying began in 1985, and test operations began in 1988.

The main line opened in 1990, initially connecting Senri-Chuo and Minami-Ibaraki, providing a suburban connection between the Kita-Osaka-Kyuko Railway, Hankyu Senri Line, and Hankyu Kyoto Line. It was extended to Shibahara in 1994, and to Osaka Airport and Kadomashi in 1997 (connecting it to the Hankyu Takarazuka Line, Tanimachi Line, and Keihan Main Line). The branch Saito Line opened in 1998 with service to Handai-byoin-mae, and was extended to Saito-Nishi in 2007.

The system carried 4.7 million passengers in its first year of operations. In FY 1998, the first full year of operations on the completed Main Line, the system carried 26.3 million passengers. After a slump due to the COVID-19 pandemic in the early 2020s, the system carried a record 52 million passengers in FY 2025.

Guinness World Records recognized the Osaka Monorail as the world's longest monorail system in 1998. It lost this title in November 2013 but remains the longest monorail system in Japan.

In 2015, Osaka Prefecture announced plans to extend the monorail to Uryudo in Higashiōsaka. As of 2024, geotechnical investigations have started and the extension is projected to open in 2033. The extension will connect the system to the Nagahori Tsurumi-Ryokuchi Line, Gakkentoshi Line, Keihanna Line, and Nara Line, and improve rail access between northern Osaka, Ikoma, and Nara.

== See also ==
- Monorails in Japan
- List of rapid transit systems
