= Itami Airport =

Airport in Hyogo and Osaka prefecture, Japan

Osaka Itami Airport

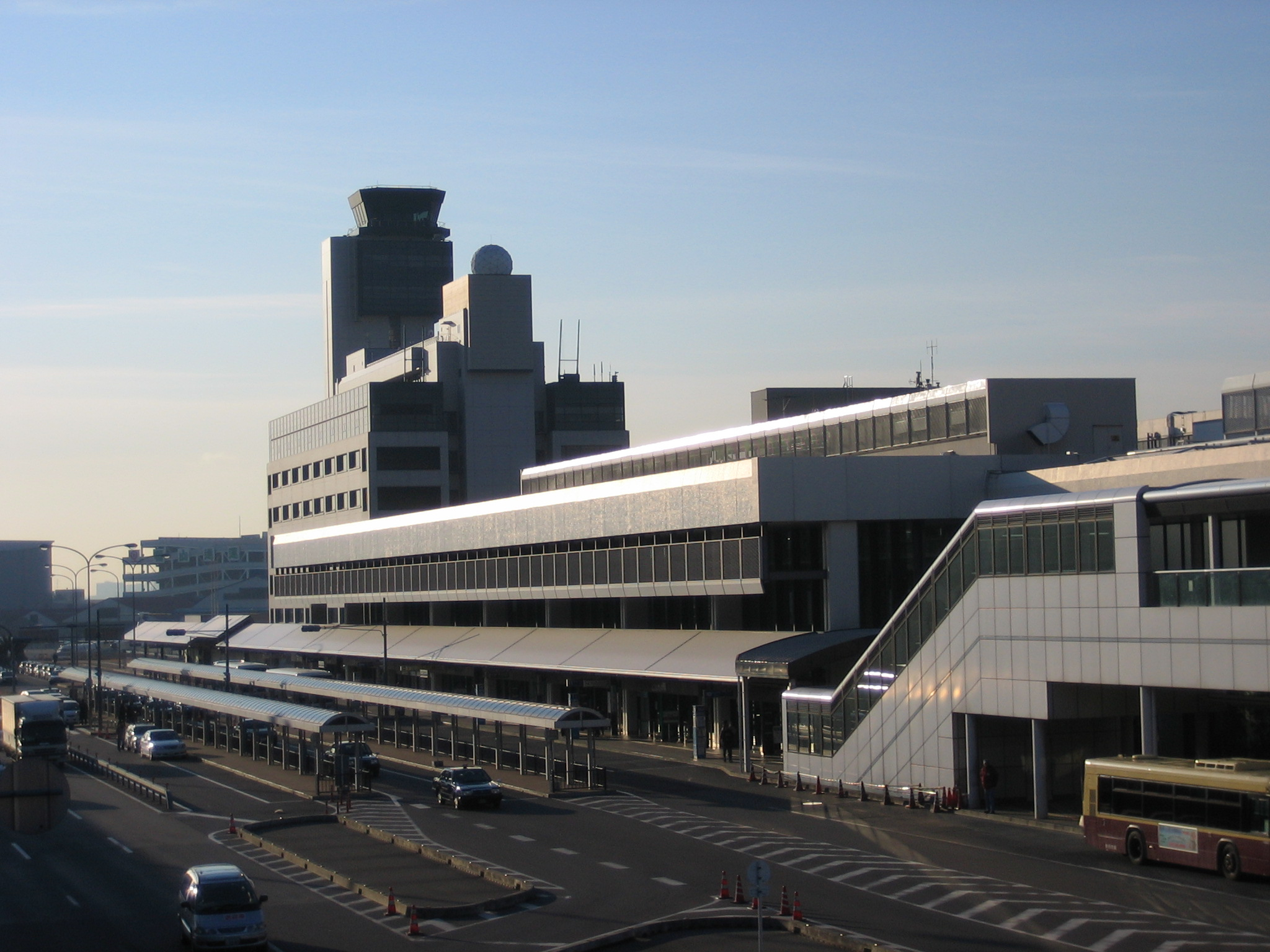
- IATA: ITM; ICAO: RJOO; WMO: 47771

Summary
- Airport type: Public
- Owner: New Kansai International Airport Company (NKIAC)
- Operator: Kansai Airports (Orix and Vinci Airports)
- Serves: Keihanshin
- Location: Itami, Hyogo; Ikeda, Osaka; Toyonaka, Osaka
- Opened: 1939; 87 years ago
- Hub for: All Nippon Airways; Japan Airlines
- Elevation AMSL: 39 ft (12 m)
- Coordinates: 34°47′04″N 135°26′21″E
- Website: www.osaka-airport.co.jp/en/

Map
- Location in Osaka Prefecture Location in Hyogo Prefecture Location in Japan Location in Asia

Runways
Direction	Length		Surface
Direction	m	ft	Surface
14R/32L	3,000	9,843	Asphalt concrete
14L/32R	1,800	5,906	Asphalt concrete

Statistics (2024)
- Passengers: 15,157,501
- Cargo (metric tonnes): 90,004
- Aircraft movement: 139,630
- Source: English Kansai Airports

Osaka Itami Airport (大阪伊丹空港, Ōsaka Itami Kūkō; IATA: ITM, ICAO: RJOO) is the primary domestic airport for the Kansai region of Japan, including its major cities of Osaka, Kyoto, and Kobe. It is the airport closest to Osaka, being 11 km (6.8 mi) north of Osaka Station, as well as Kyoto, being 36 km (22 mi) southwest of Kyoto Station. Itami Airport has a small footprint, covering only 311 hectares (768 acres) of land.

Until January 2025, the airport was known as Osaka International Airport (大阪国際空港, Ōsaka Kokusai Kūkō), which remains the airport's official Japanese name. Despite the "international" designation, the airport caters exclusively to domestic flights. Kansai International Airport (43 km (27 mi) away) took over the region's international traffic in 1994 and competes with Itami for domestic traffic. Itami also faces competition from Kobe Airport (26 km or 16 mi away), a smaller domestic airport opened in 2006.

The airport was named after the city of Itami, Hyōgo Prefecture, because most of its land is located there. A portion of the airport property is also located in Toyonaka and Ikeda cities of Osaka Prefecture. The terminal complex is located in all three of these cities, and the only access from the Itami side is via a long tunnel that passes below the runway and apron.

In FY2006, Itami used to be Japan's third busiest airport and the Kansai region's busiest. In 2015, it had 139,450 aircraft movements, serving 14,541,936 domestic passengers and carrying 140,668 metric tons of freight cargo. In 2018, Itami was the seventh busiest in Japan, serving 16.3 million passengers. In the Kansai region, Kansai International Airport had far more passengers than Itami Airport.

== History ==
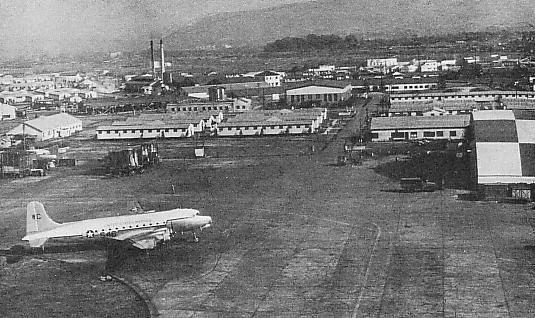
Itami Air Base around 1954

Itami Airport opened as No. 2 Osaka Airport (第二大阪飛行場, Dai-ni Ōsaka Hikōjō) in 1939. Prior to the opening of Itami, Kizugawa Airport was Osaka's main civilian airport. It handled both seaplanes and conventional ones. The site of Kizugawa Airport is now a port area in Funamachi in south end of Taisho Ward with only a small marker located in Funamachi Ryokuchi Park below the Shin-Kizugawa Bridge.

In 1931, the Osaka municipal government drafted plans to construct a new "No. 1 Osaka Airport" near the mouth of the Yamato River, also targeted at seaplanes, but concerns about fog and protests from Kobe-based businesses led the government to build the "No. 2 Airport" for land-based aircraft instead.

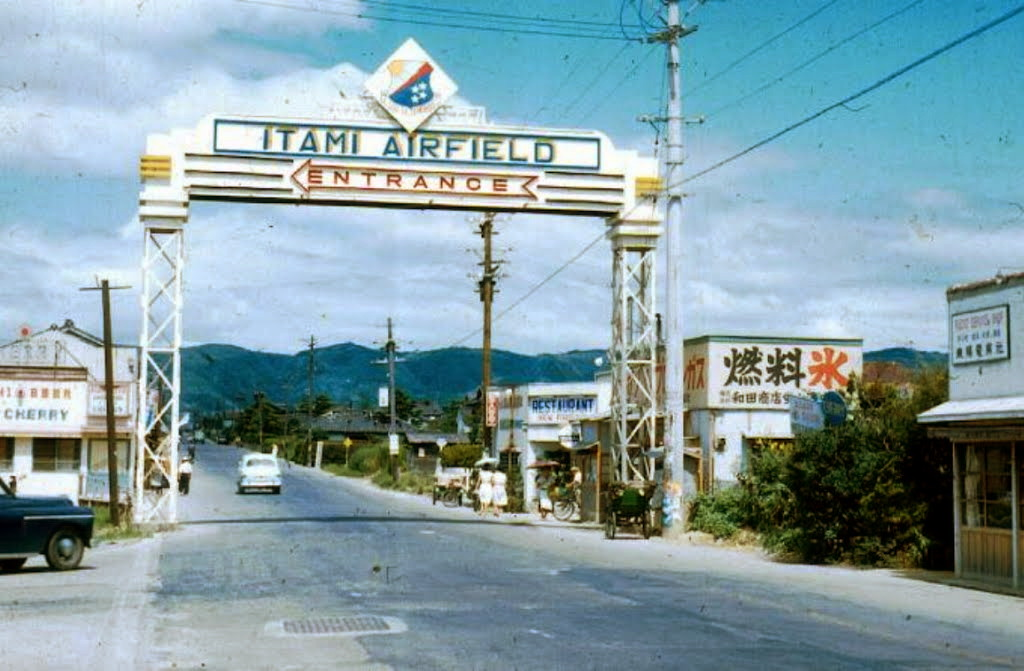
Itami Air Base entrance sign – 1957

Construction began in July 1936 on a 53-hectare (131 acre) site. The new airport opened on January 17, 1939, and was primarily used by the Imperial Japanese Army during its early years. It had four runways at the time, ranging in length from 1,100 to 1,600 m, and could handle aircraft as large as the Douglas DC-3.

=== U.S. occupation ===
U.S. occupation forces took over Osaka No. 2 Airport after the end of World War II in 1945, expanding it to 221 hectares and renaming it Itami Air Base. The airfield was used extensively by US forces during the Korean War. In 1954, Marilyn Monroe and Joe DiMaggio stopped at Itami during their honeymoon, and in 1956, the base was used in the filming of the movie Sayonara. Japan Airlines operated its inaugural flight between Itami and Tokyo's Haneda Airport on October 25, 1951, using a Martin 2-0-2 aircraft leased from Northwest Airlines. JAL initially operated from a small joint-use section of the U.S. air base.

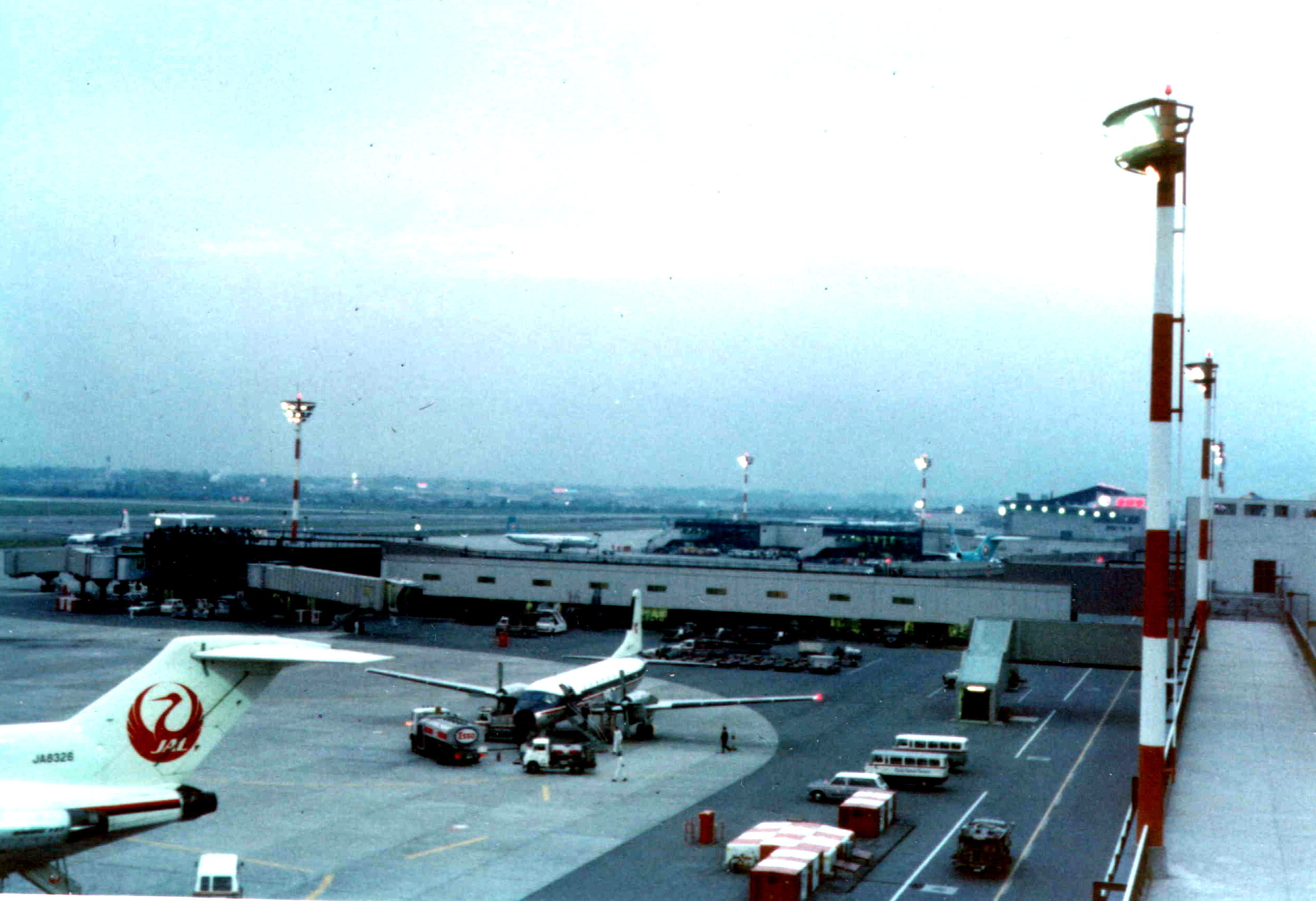
Domestic Terminal seen in 1971, with a handful of Boeing 727s and NAMC-YS 11

Itami was fully returned to the Japanese government in March 1958, and was renamed Osaka Airport (大阪空港, Ōsaka Kūkō) in March 1958 and Osaka International Airport in July 1959.

=== International era (1950s-1994) ===
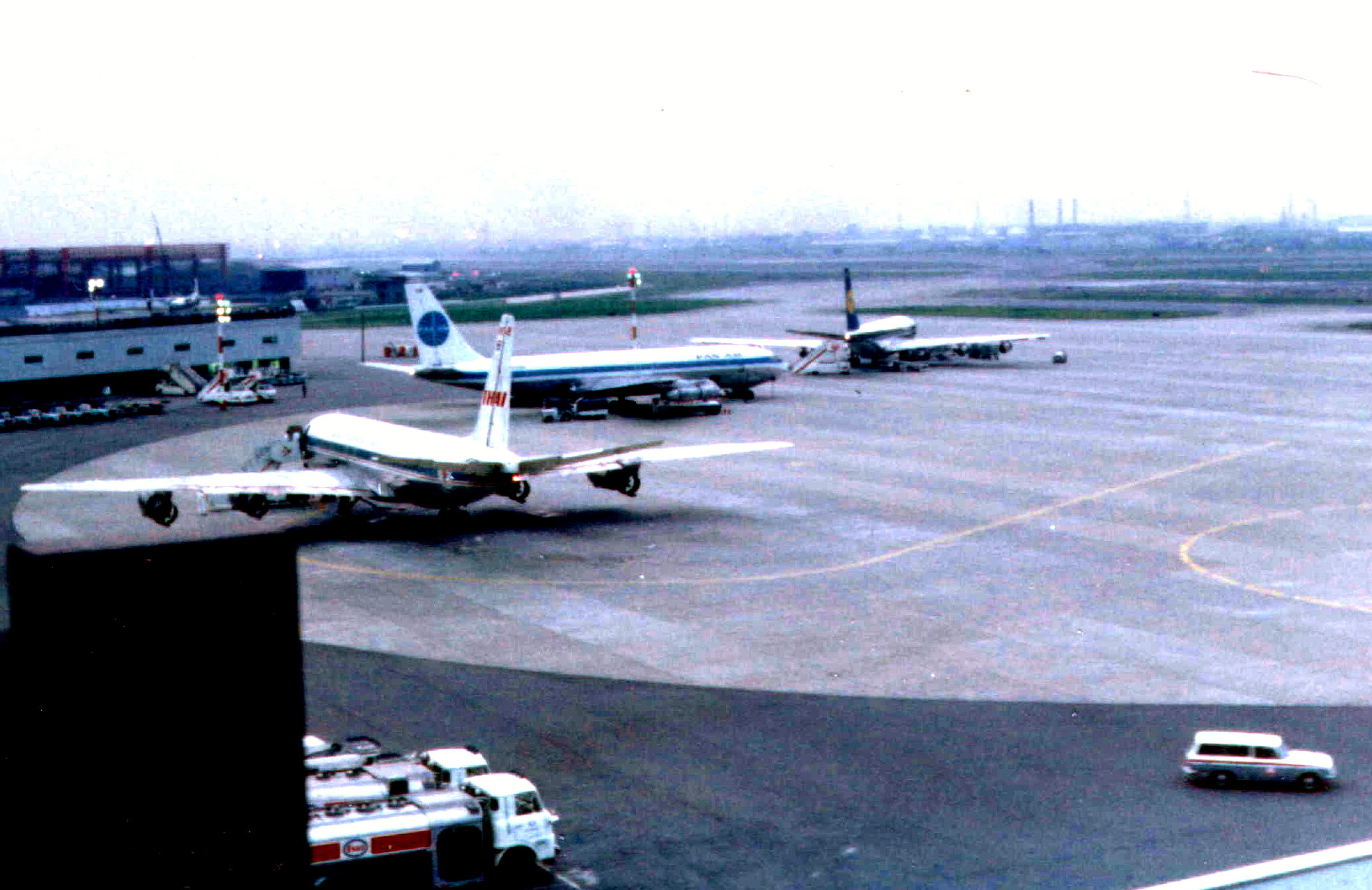
International terminal 1971

Japan Airlines and Cathay Pacific opened international flights from Osaka to Hong Kong in 1960. Although Itami saw its first passenger jet service (Caravelle service from Thai Airways International) in 1964, the runways and terminals at Osaka lacked the capacity to handle larger jets such as the de Havilland Comet, Douglas DC-8 and Boeing 707, which had already begun operating at Tokyo's Haneda Airport in 1959.

The Japanese government quickly implemented a plan to expand Osaka Airport by an additional 82.5 ha so that it could accommodate jet aircraft. Despite some protests from locals, the plan was approved by the neighboring city assemblies between 1960 and 1961 with strong backing from local business groups, and land was purchased between 1962 and 1964, in part out of the aviation industry's interest in keeping pace with the development of the Tokaido Shinkansen high-speed rail link between Tokyo and Osaka. The current main runway was completed in 1970.

In its heyday Itami was served by a variety of major international carriers, including Pan Am (Japan routes transferred to United in 1985), British Airways, Air India, Cathay Pacific and Korean Air.

Northwest Airlines was a major international operator at Itami, and by 1992 offered nonstop service to New York, Los Angeles, Honolulu and Sydney. The Sydney service became the focus of a rare aviation agreement dispute between the United States and Australia, as less than 30% of passengers on the Australia-Japan segment were originating in the U.S. even though the "primary objective" of the route authority, according to the US-Australia aviation agreement, was service between the US and Australia. In 1993, after Australia demanded arbitration and the US implemented retaliatory sanctions against Qantas, Northwest was forced to limit the amount of local Australia-Japan traffic on the Osaka-Sydney route, and subsequently abandoned the service entirely.

BOAC operated in Osaka until 1974, flying from either Taipei or Tokyo.

=== Political friction ===
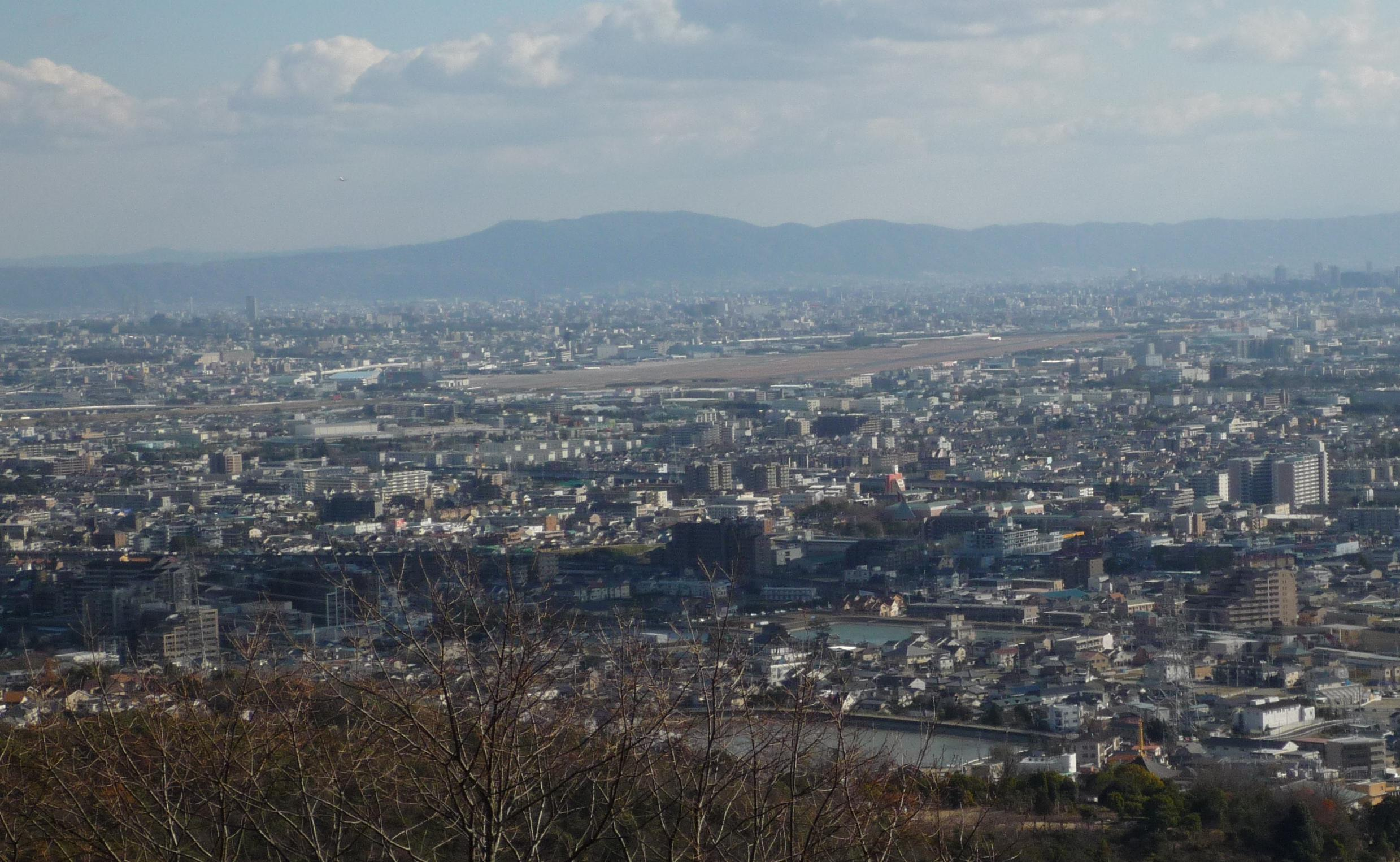
Aerial view of Itami Airport and surrounding cities in 2009

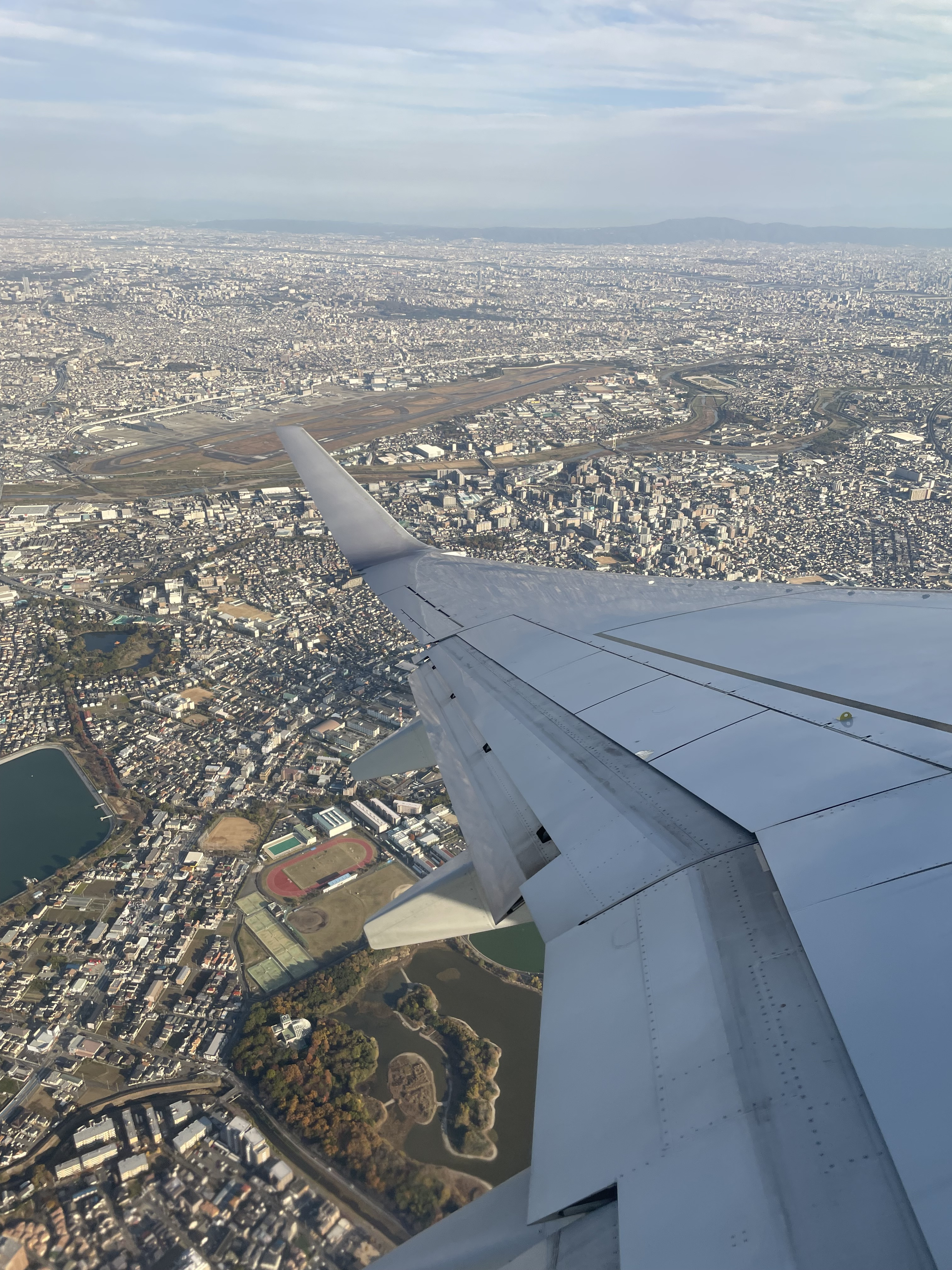
Aerial photo of Itami Airport taken from a Japan Airlines Boeing 737-800 in 2022

While Japan's economy was growing rapidly, the area around Itami Airport became an increasingly dense residential area for commuters to Osaka.

A number of factors made the airport an intensely debated political issue in the 1960s and 1970s, among them:

- The introduction of jet aircraft made noise and air pollution a growing concern among locals.
- The United States Armed Forces had rights to use Itami Airport for refueling and maintenance, and frequently sent military aircraft there for overhauls at the Shin Maywa Industries plant there. This activity caused consternation among locals who were opposed to the Vietnam War.

Jet flights at Itami began on June 1, 1964, and triggered complaints by neighboring residents about noise pollution. In addition, eminent domain procedures were used in 1966 to obtain land for the runway expansion at Itami and led to local protests, as had also been the case in the construction of Narita International Airport near Tokyo.

In May 1968, a group of local citizens decided to sue the government for damages related to noise pollution from Itami Airport. The lawsuit was filed in December 1969. The Japanese government concurrently banned takeoffs and landings at Itami between 10:30 PM and 6:30 AM, effective February 1970. While the litigation continued, the city of Itami issued a public declaration in October 1973 calling for the closure of the airport.

In February 1974, the Osaka District Court issued a qualified ruling in favor of the plaintiffs which limited the scope of their damages. The plaintiffs appealed to the Osaka High Court, which ruled in November 1975 that the plaintiffs were entitled to both a wider scope of damages and an injunction halting flights at the airport between 9 PM and 7 AM. This was a landmark decision in Japanese environmental law as it set a precedent for polluters to be enjoined and to be required to pay damages to victims. However, the state then appealed to the Supreme Court of Japan, which deliberated for almost six years before ruling in 1981 that the High Court injunction was illegal (though the victims remained entitled to damages).

By the mid-1970s, the airport was subject to extensive slot restrictions, with operations limited to 200 jets and 170 propeller aircraft per day, and no takeoffs or landings allowed after 9 PM. These restrictions led the major domestic airlines to adopt more widebody aircraft in ultra-high-density configurations on Itami routes. The introduction of these widebodies caused additional concern among locals who protested the increased pollution and greater dangers in the event of a crash.

==== International service before 1994 ====
Airlines	Destinations	Refs.
Air France	Anchorage, Athens, Bangkok-Don Mueang, Beirut, Dhahran, Hong Kong-Kai Tak, Karachi, Manila, Mumbai, Paris-Charles de Gaulle, Paris-Orly, Rome, Tehran	
Air India	Bangkok-Don Mueang, Delhi, Hong Kong-Kai Tak, Mumbai	
British Airways (BOAC until 1974)	Anchorage, Colombo, London-Heathrow	
CAAC	Shanghai-Hongqiao	
Cathay Pacific	Hong Kong-Kai Tak, Taipei-Chiang Kai-shek	
China Airlines	Hong Kong-Kai Tak, Taipei-Songshan	
Civil Air Transport	Taipei-Songshan	
Japan Airlines	Beijing, Busan, Copenhagen, Dusseldorf, Frankfurt, Guam, Hamburg, Hong Kong-Kai Tak, Honolulu, London-Heathrow, Manila, Paris-Charles de Gaulle, Saipan, Seoul-Gimpo, Shanghai-Hongqiao, Singapore, Taipei-Songshan	
Japan Asia Airways	Kaohsiung, Taipei-Chiang Kai-shek	
Korean Air	Busan, Jeju, Seoul-Gimpo, Taipei-Chiang Kai-shek	
Lufthansa	Anchorage, Dusseldorf, Frankfurt, Hamburg	
Northwest Airlines	Anchorage, Chicago-O'Hare, Detroit, Honolulu, Los Angeles, Memphis, Minneapolis/St. Paul, New York-JFK, San Francisco, Seattle/Tacoma, Sydney, Taipei-Chiang Kai-shek	
Pan American World Airways	Fairbanks, Guam, Honolulu, Los Angeles, New York-JFK, Seoul-Gimpo	
Singapore Airlines	Singapore, Taipei-Chiang Kai-shek	
Thai Airways International	Bangkok-Don Mueang, Manila, Taipei-Chiang Kai-shek	
United Airlines	Honolulu, San Francisco	

=== 1994~ Domestic era ===
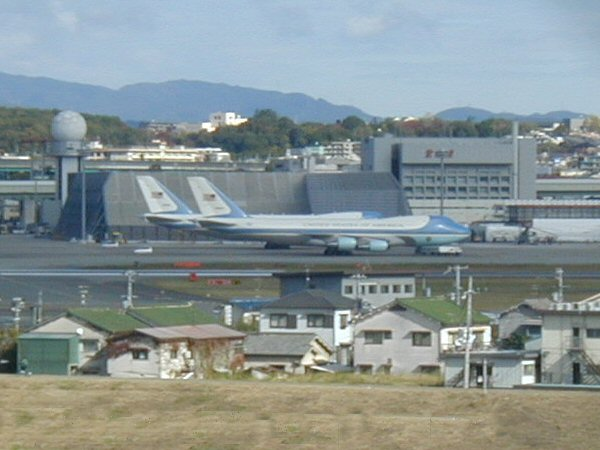
Air Force One aircraft parked at Osaka Airport

Because of the political friction surrounding Itami, planners began work in the 1970s to relocate many of its flights to an offshore location. This plan led to the opening of Kansai International Airport, in 1994 on an artificial island in Osaka Bay. Upon the opening of Kansai, all international service at Itami was transferred to Kansai, and the IATA airport code of Itami Airport was changed from OSA to ITM.

Prior to the opening of Kansai, an agreement was reached between the national and local governments in 1990 to maintain Itami as a domestic airport. The city of Itami also reversed its anti-airport stance from the 1970s, officially declaring in April 2007 that the city would co-exist with the airport.

Itami has been used by international charters for state visits – Air Force One visited Itami in November 2005 and June 2019, and Chinese premier Wen Jiabao landed at Itami in April 2007 – and by Asiana Airlines charter flights to and from South Korea in late 2015. All Nippon Airways retains a large maintenance base at Itami which occasionally services aircraft ferried in from overseas without passengers, and some international cargo flights continue to use the airport as well.

The policy of the Japanese government has been to limit operations at Itami in order to spur development at Kansai and Kobe. Commercial passenger aircraft with more than two engines were banned from Itami effective April 2006, although such aircraft may continue to make ferry flights to and from Itami for maintenance purposes. All Nippon Airways flew a 747 to Itami on January 12, 2014, the first 747 operation at the airport in eight years, for an open house event to commemorate the upcoming retirement of ANA's 747 fleet in March 2014.

The government proposed changing Itami's status from first-class airport to second-class airport, which would saddle local governments with one-third of its operating costs; after protests from the surrounding local authorities, the national government withdrew this proposal. The government also proposed banning widebody aircraft from Itami, although this proposal was criticized as unrealistic given the volume of traffic there.

In May 2011, the Diet of Japan passed legislation to form a new Kansai International Airport Corporation using the state's existing equity stake in Kansai Airport and its property holdings at Itami Airport. The move was aimed at offsetting Kansai Airport's debt burden. NKIAC started free shuttle bus service between Itami and Kansai for transfer passengers in order to further integrate the two as a single hub. Itami has also seen increased domestic passenger traffic in 2013 following the easing of flight restrictions, which was possible due to propeller aircraft being replaced by quieter regional jets; JAL was able to increase the frequency on its Itami-Fukuoka route from two flights to five flights daily, making the route more competitive with the Sanyō Shinkansen rail service.

In September 2013, NKIAC announced that it would acquire Osaka Airport Terminal Co. for 27.8 billion yen, which an NKIAC official called the "last piece" of the integration of both airports' management. NKIAC plans to market Itami Airport to business travelers by touting its convenience for domestic business travel and improving its connectivity to Narita International Airport, while continuing to market Kansai Airport to leisure and international travelers.

Following Typhoon Jebi, which resulted in the temporary closure of Kansai Airport in September 2018, operating hours at both Itami and Kobe were extended, and the government began considering permitting international service at all three Osaka area airports. Japan Airlines later announced that it would operate two special flights between Itami and Hong Kong in mid-October 2018. These would be the first scheduled international passenger flights to or from Itami in 24 years.

=== Plans ===
Itami is limited to domestic flights, and can only handle 18 landings per hour and 370 landings per day. As of July 2013, NKIAC is considering providing more leniency to the aforementioned restrictions through negotiations with local authorities, on the basis that advances in technology have allowed modern aircraft to be quieter than those in operation when the restrictions were imposed. NKIAC hopes to coordinate with local governments to increase the number of slots allowed during the day and to open additional slots during nighttime hours.

Both Hyogo Prefecture and Itami City are supporters of expanded service at Itami, and established a formal coordination body in July 2013 to propose further reforms such as allowing international charter flights, and to engage in local efforts such as improving ground transportation and publicizing the airport's convenience. They planned to enlist the support of the other neighboring municipalities of Toyonaka, Takarazuka and Ikeda. On the other hand, the Japanese government has supported Kansai at Itami's expense, and former Osaka City mayor and former Osaka Prefecture governor Toru Hashimoto has been a particularly vocal critic of the airport, arguing that the planned Chuo Shinkansen maglev line will make much of its domestic role irrelevant, and that its domestic functions should be transferred to Kansai Airport in conjunction with upgraded high-speed access to Kansai from central Osaka. In 2009, Hashimoto proposed closing Itami and converting the site into an "International Campus Freedom City" operating in the English language with 20,000 residents; the governor of Hyogo criticized the idea as "complete nonsense." Hashimoto later expressed support for Transport Minister Seiji Maehara's plan to maintain Itami with further restrictions on the size of aircraft.

=== 2015~ Privatization ===
Kansai International Airport Corporation conducted a public tender to sell the operating rights for Kansai and Itami Airport in May 2015. A consortium of Orix, Vinci SA owning 40% of shares, with the remainder 20% owned by Kansai-based enterprises such as Hankyu Hanshin Holdings and Panasonic was the sole bidder for the 45-year contract, at a price of around $18 billion.

This new operating company, called Kansai Airports, has been operating Kansai and Itami airports since April 1, 2016, as well as the region's third airport Kobe Airport, since April 1, 2018.

On January 30, 2025, the airport's English name and signs were officially changed to "Osaka Itami Airport", to avoid confusion as some travelers could mistake the "Osaka International Airport" name which has no international flights, with Kansai International Airport.

== Terminal ==
Itami Airport has a single terminal building with 21 gates, divided into the "North Terminal" for JAL and Amakusa Airlines; and the "South Terminal" for ANA and IBEX. The departure and arrival zones of the two terminals are connected by a "Central Block" containing shops, restaurants and a hotel.

The terminal was planned to be extensively renovated by August 2020 to include a new pier for additional aircraft, consolidated departures and arrivals facilities (including a single central security checkpoint with expanded capacity) and a new shopping and dining area. Work began in February 2016, and the renovated central area became operational in 2018. On August 5, 2020, the terminal's complete renovation was completed. The latest facilities have helped the airport to rank 78th in Skytrax’s world airport rankings for 2024, up from 95th the previous year.

== Airlines and destinations ==
Airlines	Destinations
All Nippon Airways	Hakodate, Kagoshima, Kumamoto, Miyazaki, Naha, Niigata, Sapporo–Chitose, Sendai, Tokyo–Haneda, Tokyo-Narita
Amakusa Airlines	Kumamoto
ANA Wings	Akita, Aomori, Fukuoka, Fukushima, Kagoshima, Kōchi, Kumamoto, Matsuyama, Nagasaki, Niigata, Ōita, Sapporo–Chitose, Sendai, Tokyo–Haneda
Ibex Airlines	Fukushima, Niigata, Sendai
J-Air	Akita, Aomori, Fukuoka, Hakodate, Hanamaki, Izumo, Kagoshima, Kumamoto, Matsuyama, Misawa, Miyazaki, Nagasaki, Niigata, Ōita, Oki, Sapporo–Chitose, Sendai, Yamagata; Seasonal: Matsumoto
Japan Air Commuter	Tajima, Tanegashima, Yakushima
Japan Airlines	Amami Ōshima, Asahikawa, Naha, Sapporo–Chitose, Tokyo–Haneda, Tokyo-Narita
Japan Transocean Air	Naha

== Statistics ==
=== Top destinations ===
Busiest domestic routes from ITM (2014)
Rank	Airport	Passengers	Carriers
1	Tokyo–Haneda	5,274,627	All Nippon Airways, Japan Airlines
2	Naha	923,752	All Nippon Airways, Japan Airlines
3	Sendai	894,926	All Nippon Airways, Japan Airlines
4	Sapporo–Chitose	817,364	All Nippon Airways, Japan Airlines
5	Kagoshima	701,233	All Nippon Airways, Japan Airlines
6	Fukuoka	670,759	All Nippon Airways, Japan Airlines
7	Miyazaki	538,827	All Nippon Airways, Japan Airlines
8	Matsuyama	518,114	All Nippon Airways, Japan Airlines

^{Source: Ministry of Land, Infrastructure and Transport Civil Aviation Bureau 2014}

== Ground transportation ==
=== Rail ===
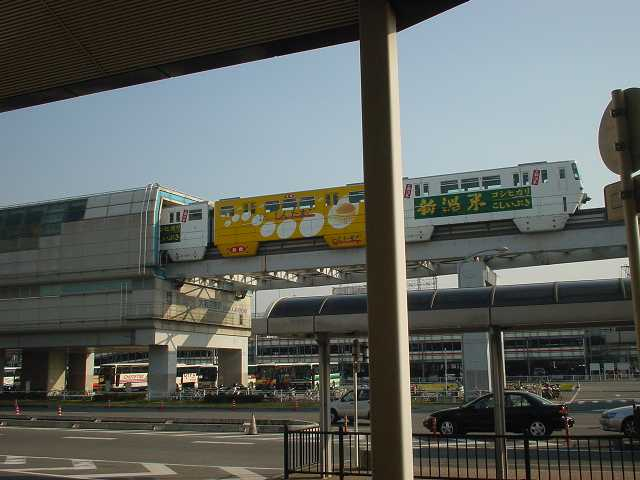
Osaka Monorail train leaving Osaka Airport Station

The only direct railway connection to the airport is the Osaka Monorail, which serves the northern suburbs of Osaka.

The monorail connects to the following lines:

- Hankyu Takarazuka Line at Hotarugaike Station
- Kita-Osaka Kyuko Railway (Midōsuji Metro Line) at Senri-Chuo Station
- Hankyu Senri Line at Yamada Station
- Hankyu Kyoto Line at Minami-Ibaraki Station
- Tanimachi Metro Line at Dainichi Station
- Keihan Main Line at Kadoma-shi Station

«	Service	»
Osaka Monorail Main Line (11)
Terminus	-	Hotarugaike (12)

Several plans have been formulated for improving rail access to the airport. Hankyu considered building a spur from the Takarazuka Line to the airport in the 1970s, but did not proceed with the project due to capacity constraints on the Takarazuka Line; Hankyu reportedly re-commenced studies of the project in 2017. JR West announced a plan to build a line to the airport from Itami around 1989 but never proceeded, due in part to the 2005 Amagasaki derailment and demand concerns following the opening of Kobe Airport. Hyogo Prefecture also considered building a light rail system from the airport to central Itami around 2007, but was unwilling to commit funding for the project due to profitability concerns. An April 2018 study by the Ministry of Land, Infrastructure, Transport and Tourism concluded that a 4 km, 70 billion yen spur line from Sone to the airport, allowing one-stop express service to Umeda in around 20 minutes, would deliver a greater benefit-cost ratio than many other Japanese rail projects in terms of the number of passengers assisted, but would not be profitable at Hankyu's standard fare level and would require a significant surcharge in order to break even.

=== Road ===
Itami Airport is directly connected to the Hanshin Expressway Ikeda Route and is five minutes' drive from the Chugoku Expressway, making it possible to reach central Osaka by car or bus in 25 to 30 minutes, central Kobe in 40 minutes and central Kyoto in 55 minutes.

== Mascot ==
Sorayan, Itami Airport's mascot.

Itami Airport's mascot is named Sorayan, and was created for the airport's 75th anniversary. She is a round, humanoid airplane who wears a captain's hat, and speaks with an Osaka accent. The name was chosen from over 1,900 suggestions sent to airport operators, and is a combination of Sora, Japanese for "Sky", and Yan, a word used for emphasis in the local dialect. Her interests include roaming around the airport and fashion, as indicated by her collection of the silk scarves worn by Japanese flight attendants. She has made appearances with Kan-kun, the mascot of nearby Kansai International Airport.

== Accidents and incidents ==
- 30 September 1957: Douglas DC-4 JA6011 of Japan Airlines suffered a number one engine failure on takeoff and stalled, crash landing in a rice paddy in Toyonaka. Seven were injured.
- 12 June 1961: Vickers Viscount G-APKJ of All Nippon Airways was damaged beyond economic repair when the starboard undercarriage collapsed following a heavy landing.
- 2 June 1978: Japan Airlines Flight 115 suffered a severe tailstrike upon landing on Runway 32L of Osaka Airport, causing 25 injuries in the process. The aircraft involved, Boeing 747 JA8119, would suffer a structural failure on 12 August 1985 as Japan Air Lines Flight 123, which was also en route to Osaka Airport, and result in the deadliest single-aircraft accident in history.
- 26 October 1986: Thai Airways International Flight 620, an Airbus A300 from Don Mueang International Airport of Bangkok via Ninoy Aquino International Airport of Manila, was on approach to Osaka when an explosion caused rapid decompression in the rear fuselage. The aircraft control systems were damaged but the pilot accomplished an emergency landing at Osaka. 62 passengers were injured due to pitch oscillation following the decompression. The cause of the incident was believed to be the explosion of a hand grenade carried on board by a member of the Yamaguchi gumi and set off in the lavatory.
- 20 March 2009: The pilot of All Nippon Airways Flight 18 misheard a takeoff clearance given to All Nippon Airways 181 as that of their own, leading them to enter the runway without clearance and forcing JAL Express Flight 2200 to abort its landing approach and initiate a go-around.

== See also ==
- Kansai Airports
- Kansai International Airport
- Kobe Airport
