= Kadoma-shi Station =

Railway and monorail station in Kadoma, Osaka Prefecture, Japan

Kadomashi/Kadoma-shi Station 門真市駅
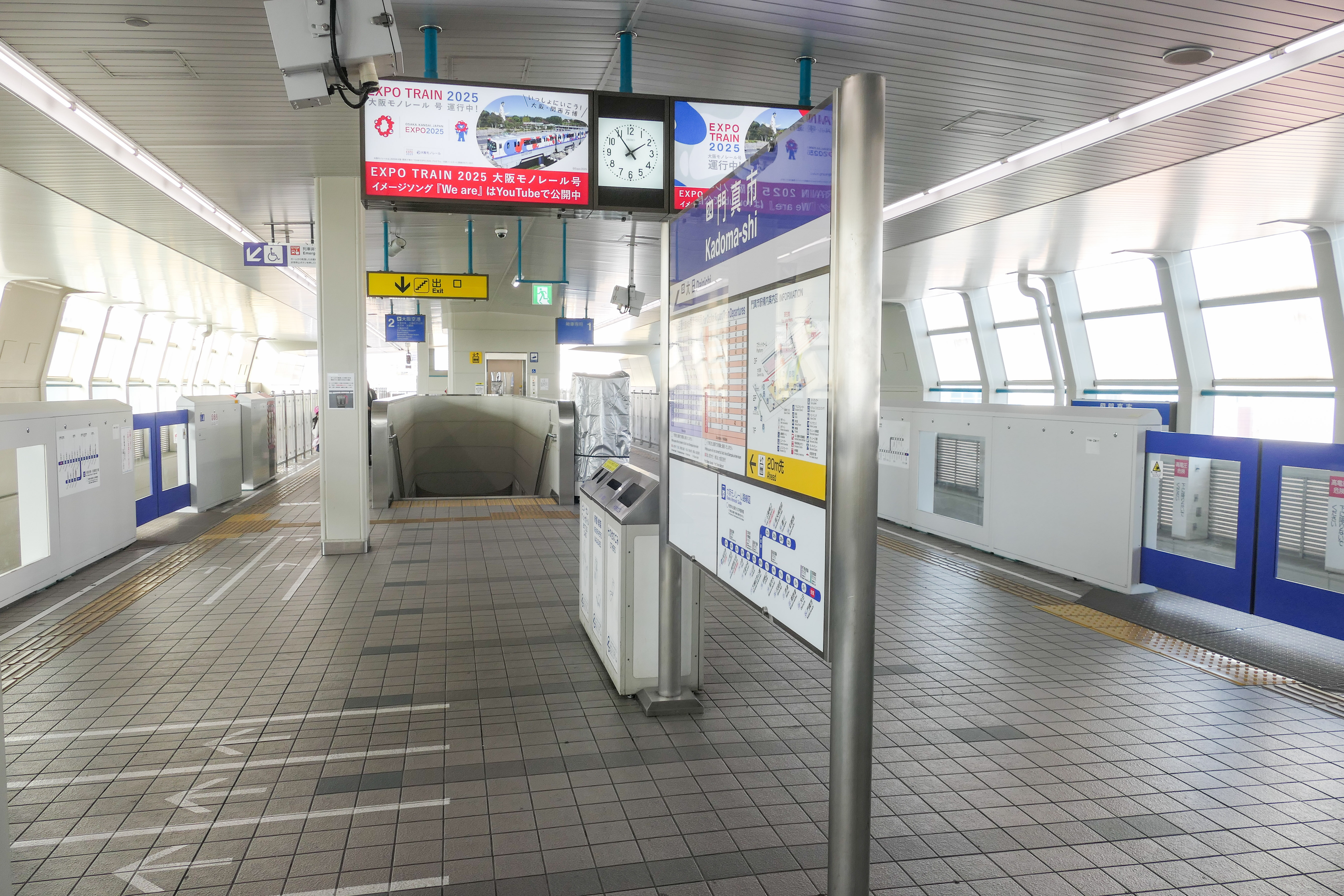
- Main Line platform, December 2024

General information
- Location: Shinbashicho, Kadoma-shi, Osaka-fu 571-0048; Japan
- Coordinates: 34°44′17.57″N 135°34′59.76″E
- Operator: Keihan Electric Railway; Osaka Monorail
- Lines: ■ Keihan Main Line; ■ Osaka Monorail Main Line
- Platforms: 2 side + 1 island platforms
- Connections: Bus stop

Other information
- Station code: KH13, 24

History
- Opened: June 20, 1971
- Former names: Shin-Kadoma (until 1975)

Passengers
- FY2019: 30,439 daily (Keihan)
Location

Kadoma-shi Station (門真市駅, Kadoma-shi-eki) is a passenger railway station in located in the city of Kadoma, Osaka Prefecture, Japan, operated by the private railway company Keihan Electric Railway and the third sector Osaka Monorail.

== Lines ==
Kadoma-shi Station is served by the Keihan Main Line, and is located 10.1 km from the starting point of the line at Yodoyabashi Station. It is also served by the Osaka Monorail Main Line and is 21.2 kilometers from Osaka Airport Station.

== Station layout ==
The Keihan station has two ground-level opposed side side platforms, with an elevated station building.The Osaka Monorail station is located in the south of the Keihan Main Line and has an island platform serving two elevated tracks.

== Platforms ==
1	■ Keihan Main Line	for Kayashima, Hirakatashi, Sanjō and Demachiyanagi
2	■ Keihan Main Line	for Moriguchishi, Kyōbashi, and Yodoyabashi

1	■ terminating trains	
2	■ Main Line	for Minami-Ibaraki, Bampaku-kinen-kōen (Expo '70 Commemoration Park), Senri-Chūō, Osaka Airport, Saito-nishi

== Adjacent stations ==
«	Service	»
Keihan Main Line
Nishisansō	Local	Furukawabashi
Nishisansō	Semi-Express (区間急行)	Furukawabashi
Sub Express (準急): Does not stop at this station
Commuter Sub Express (only running for Yodoyabashi and Nakanoshima): Does not stop at this station
Express: Does not stop at this station
Midnight Express (only running for Kuzuha): Does not stop at this station
Rapid Express: Does not stop at this station
Commuter Rapid Express (only running for Nakanoshima): Does not stop at this station
Limited Express: Does not stop at this station
Osaka Monorail Main Line (24)
Dainichi (23)	-	Terminus

== History ==
The Keihan station was opened on 20 June 1971 as Shin-Kadoma Station (新門真駅). It was renamed to its present name on 23 March 1975. The station for the Osaka Monorail Main Line opened on 22 August 1997 when the line was extended from Minami Ibaraki.

== Passenger statistics ==
In fiscal 2019, the Keihan station was used by an average of 30,439 passengers daily and the Osaka Monorail portion was used by 23,027 passengers daily

== Surrounding area ==
- Kadoma City Hall
- Kadoma Fire Station
- Kadoma City Library
- Kadoma Ginza Shopping Street (Shotengai)
- Sumitomo-dori Shopping Street (Shotengai)
- Izumiya
- Panasonic Corporation branch office

=== Bus stop ===
Keihan Bus Co., Ltd.

- Route 3 for Kadoma-minami via Shikenjo-mae (only 1 service every day except Saturdays, Sundays and holidays)

== See also ==
- List of railway stations in Japan
