= Settsu (disambiguation) =

Settsu may refer to:

- Settsu, Osaka
- Settsu province, the old province of Japan
- the Japanese battleship Settsu
- Tadashi Settsu, a Japanese baseball player
- A railway station:
  - Minami Settsu Station
  - Settsu Station
  - Settsu-Motoyama Station
  - Settsu-shi Station
  - Settsu-Tonda Station
