= Infinity 16 =

- Origin: Japan
- Genres: J-pop, Reggae
- Years active: 1994–present
- Labels: Far Eastern Tribe Records
- Members: Tela-C
- Past members: Decem
- Website: www.infinity16sound.com

Infinity 16 (stylized as INFINITY16) is a Japanese reggae sound system. They debuted as a major label artist in 2008. The project's most successful songs include "Dream Lover" (a collaboration with Shōnan no Kaze, Minmi and Moomin) and "Tsutaetai Koto ga Konna Aru noni" (with Wakadanna from Shōnan no Kaze and Jay'ed).

== Biography ==
In 1994, Tela-C started the project, with member Decem joining in the following year. The members stayed overseas in places such as New York City and Jamaica in 1998, and in 2002 started focusing on music properly. The group played at many clubs throughout Japan, and in 2004 won Club Citta's Sound Clash Tournament in Kawasaki.

Between 2005 and 2007, the group released six albums independently. In March 2007, the group won at the World Reggae Soundclash in Brooklyn, New York (in the International Cup‐Garrison Showdown category).

In 2007, Infinity 16 debuted under the major label Far Eastern Tribe Records, with the single "Dream Land" (with Shōnan no Kaze, Minmi and Moomin). At the same time, member Decem left the project.

== Discography ==
=== Albums ===
Year	Album Information	Oricon Albums Charts
2005	Real Warriors: Released: April 8, 2005; Label: Infinity16 (INFCD-002); Formats: CD	—
2005	Run Tings: Released: November 11, 2005; Label: Infinity16 (INFCD-003); Formats: CD	—
2005	The Heritage: Released: December 2, 2005; Label: Infinity16 (INFCD-004); Formats: CD	—
2006	Toppa Tings: Released: June 24, 2006; Label: Infinity16 (INFCD-005); Formats: CD	—
2006	Heritage Vol. 2 (ヘリテイジ, Heriteiji): Released: December 22, 2006; Label: Infinity16 (INFCD-006); Formats: CD	—
2007	Me and My Dogs: Released: September 21, 2007; Label: Infinity16 (INFCD-006); Formats: CD	197
2007	Foundation Rock: Major label debut album; Released: December 12, 2007; Label: Far Eastern Tribe (UMCF-9504); Formats: CD, digital download	10
2008	Welcomez: Released: December 24, 2008; Label: Far Eastern Tribe (UMCF-1016/7); Formats: CD, digital download	15
2010	Untitled: Released: June 16, 2010; Label: Far Eastern Tribe (UMCF-9532); Formats: CD, digital download	TBA

=== Singles ===
Release	Title	Notes	Chart positions			Album
Release	Title	Notes	Oricon Singles Charts	Billboard Japan Hot 100†	RIAJ digital tracks†	Album
2007	"Dream Lover" (Welcomez Shōnan no Kaze, Minmi, Moomin)		10	—	5*	Foundation Rock
2007	"Manatsu no Orion" (真夏のオリオン, Midsummer Orion) (Welcomez Minmi, 10-Feet)		14	—	27*	Foundation Rock
2007	"Itsumademo Merry Christmas" (いつまでもメリークリスマス, Merry Christmas) (Welcomez Shock Eye from Shōnan no Kaze, Munehiro)		15	—	25*	Foundation Rock
2008	"Jealousy" (ジェラシー, Jerashī) (Welcomez Jesse from Rize)	Re-cut single.	84	—	—	Foundation Rock
2008	"Senkōhanabi" (線香花火, Toy Fireworks) (Welcomez Goki)		46	21	79*	Welcomez
2008	"Samurai no Uta" (侍ノ詩, Samurai Song) (with Dōzan Miki feat. Controller of Chocolate)		94	—	—	Welcomez
2008	"Dream Believer (Hoshi ni Negai o)" (星に願いを, Wishing on a Star) (Welcomez Minmi, Wakadanna & Han-kun from Shōnan no Kaze, Goki)		19	13	11*	Welcomez
2009	"Tsutaetai Koto ga Konna Aru noni" (伝えたい事がこんなあるのに, I Have Stuff to Tell You, But) (Welcomez Wakadanna from Shōnan no Kaze, Jay'ed)	RIAJ #1 for three weeks.	23	45	1	TBA
2010	"Aishiteru" (愛してる, I Love You) (Welcomez Wakadanna)		24	6	3	TBA

†Japan Hot 100 established February 2008, RIAJ Digital Track Chart established April 2009.
* charted on RIAJ Chaku-uta chart.
