= Jay'ed =

- Born: Jade Goto; 16 September 1981 (age 45), Invercargill, New Zealand
- Genres: Pop, R&B, hip hop, soul
- Occupation: Singer
- Years active: 2005–present
- Labels: Pure Sand West; Toy's Factory

Jade Goto (born 16 September 1981), better known by his stage name Jay'ed (stylised as JAY'ED), is a New Zealand-born Japanese R&B singer-songwriter who debuted under Toy's Factory in 2007 and is most known for his single with Juju, "Ashita ga Kuru Nara" which sold over 140,000 copies.

== Biography ==
Jay'ed was born in 1981 in New Zealand to a Japanese father and a New Zealand mother of Samoan and Māori descent. He lived in New Zealand until he was 10, then moved to Minoh, Osaka. After deciding to become a singer, Jay'ed performed in the local Osaka club circuit. His first break into music was in 2002, when he appeared as a featured artist on a Sphere of Influence album track.

He debuted as an indie artist in 2005, with his first single "Why?". This was followed by a mini-album, Gift: Just Let Me Know, which sold over 20,000 copies. In 2008, he debuted as a major label artist on Toy's Factory with the single "Superwoman".

Jay'ed found his most success in 2009, after a duet singer Juju on the song "Ashita ga Kuru Nara," which was used as the theme song for the movie April Bride. It was a hit, reaching No. 2 on Oricon charts.

Jay'ed collaborated with Infinity 16 and Waka-danna from Shōnan no Kaze on the song "Tsutaetai Koto ga Konna Aru Noni" (伝えたい事がこんなあるのに, I Have Stuff to Tell You, But). It was not successful in physical sales or airplay, but reached No. 1 on the RIAJ digital tracks chart for three weeks. This made Jay'ed the artist with the most weeks at No. 1 (6, including Ashita ga Kuru Nara's weeks); however in mid-2010 this record was beaten by Kana Nishino. Jay'ed's 6th single, "Everybody," was picked as the KDDI au CM song, a promotion giving Jay'ed his first top 20 solo single.

== Discography ==
=== Albums ===
Year	Album Information	Chart positions	
Year	Album Information	Oricon Albums Charts	Soundscan Album Top 20
2008	"The Gift": Released: 23 January 2008; Label: Club Music Distribution (KCCD-306); Formats: CD, digital download	—	—
2009	"Musication": Released: 28 October 2009; Label: Toy's Factory (TFCC-86311); Formats: CD, digital download	6	4
2011	"Your Voice": Released: 16 November 2011; Label: VAP, Dreamusic・(TFCC-86366); Formats: CD, digital download	20	—
2017	"Here I Stand": Released: 21 June 2017; Label: Nippon Columbia - MUCD-8105(w/ DVD Limited Edition); MUCD-1389 (Regular Edition); Formats: CD, digital download	23	—

=== Collaborative albums ===
Year	Album Information	Chart positions	
Year	Album Information	Oricon Albums Charts	Soundscan Album Top 20
2014	"JAY’ED WORKS": Re-released as "JAY'ED WORKS -SPECIAL EDITION-"; Released: 12 November 2014; Re-released: 17 December 2014; Label: Universal Music Japan (UPCH-2001); Formats: CD, digital download	272	—
2017	"Sorry...come back later": AKLO×JAY’ED; Released: 21 June 2017; Label: Toy's Factory, LDH Japan (TFCC-86599); Formats: CD, digital download	77	—

=== Best albums ===
Year	Album Information	Chart positions	
Year	Album Information	Oricon Albums Charts	Soundscan Album Top 20
2006	"Gift: Just Let Me Know": Released: 10 May 2006; Label: Pure Sand West (JDSCD-002); Formats: CD, digital download	—	—

=== Cover albums ===
Year	Album Information	Chart positions	
Year	Album Information	Oricon Albums Charts	Soundscan Album Top 20
2013	"JAY’EDISCO": Released: 29 May 2013; Label: Universal Music Japan (UMCF-1089); Formats: CD, digital download	85	—

=== Singles ===
==== As lead artist ====
Release	Title	Notes	Chart positions			Album
Release	Title	Notes	Oricon Singles Charts	Billboard Japan Hot 100	RIAJ digital tracks*	Album
2005	"Why?"	Indie single.	—	—	—	The Gift
2008	"Superwoman"	Major debut single.	95	76	—	Musication
2008	"Zutto Issho" (ずっと一緒, Together More and More)		40	29	—	Musication
2009	"Saigo no Yasashisa" (最後の優しさ, Final Kindness)/ SUNLIGHT		32	—	—	Musication
2009	"Cry for You/Can't Let You Go"		44	18	15	Musication
2009	"Everybody"	KDDI au CM song.	19	7	6	Musication
2010	"Pray"		114	—	—	Your Voice
2010	"Shine"		79	—	—	Your Voice
2017	"Here I Stand"		195	—	—	Here I Stand
2017	"Different Man" (AKLO X JAY'ED)		—	—	—	Sorry... come back later

* established April 2009.

==== Digital Singles ====
Release	Title	Chart positions			Album
Release	Title	Oricon Singles Charts	Billboard Japan Hot 100	RIAJ digital tracks*	Album
2010	"Sign"	—	—	—	Your Voice
2010	"Free"	—	—	—	Your Voice
2010	"Identity" feat. CHOZEN LEE from FIRE BALL	—	—	—	Your Voice
2010	"True"	—	—	—	Non-Album Singles
2011	"TERMINAL"	—	—	—	Non-Album Singles
2011	"Toy Box" (JAY'ED x Wakadanna)	84	—	—	Your Voice
2011	"Eien wa Tada no Ichibyou Kara" (永遠はただの一秒から, Eternity is just a second) (JAY'ED x JUJU)	25	—	—	Your Voice
2013	"September (Tachytelic Remix)"	—	—	—	Non-Album Single
2013	"i will..."	—	—	—	HOTEL HEART COLLECTOR
2014	"FREEDOM"	—	—	—	HOTEL HEART COLLECTOR
2014	"Mata kimi to" (また君と, Also with you) (feat. Ms.OOJA)	—	—	—	JAY'ED WORKS
2016	"MY WAY"	—	—	—	Here I Stand
2017	"Ballin' Out"	—	—	—	Sorry... come back later
2023	"Off the Rail"	—	—	—	TBA
2023	"Rodeo"	—	—	—	TBA

==== As featured artist ====
Release	Artist	Title	Notes	Chart positions			Album
Release	Artist	Title	Notes	Oricon Singles Charts	Billboard Japan Hot 100	RIAJ digital tracks	Album
2005	Norisiam-X & Jay'ed	"Pop Them Bottles"	Coors "Zima" CM song	—	—	—	N X R 2
2008	Lisa Halim feat. Jay'ed	"Setsunai Kurai, Aishiteta." (切ないくらい、愛してた。, I Was Loving Like I Was in Pain)		—	84	—	Here I Am
2009	Juju with Jay'ed	"Ashita ga Kuru Nara" (明日がくるなら, If Tomorrow Comes)		2	1	1	Juju
2009	Lil' Eddie featuring JAY'ED and DJ Casper	"Trouble Sleeping"	Bonus single	—	—	—	City of My Heart
2009	Infinity 16 welcomez Waka-danna from Shōnan no Kaze & Jay'ed	"Tsutaetai Koto ga Konna Aru noni" (伝えたい事がこんなあるのに, I Have Stuff to Tell You, But)		23	45	1	Non-album single (Note: Non-Album Single)
2010	Emi Maria feat. Jay'ed	"We Standing Strong"	Digital single	—	—	—	Contrast
2010	May's feat. Jay'ed	"Close Your Eyes"	Digital single	—	—	12	Featuring: Collabo Best
2010	COMA-CHI feat. Jay'ed	"Love symphony"	Digital single	—	—	—	Beauty or the Beast?
2011	JAMOSA feat. Jay'ed & Wakadanna	"Nanika Hitotsu" (何かひとつ, Something)	Misaki Number One ending theme	10	—	—	SKY
2011	STUDIO APARTMENT feat. May J. & JAY'ED	"Futari" (二人, Two persons) (Piano in Version)	Digital single	—	—	—	Nihon no Uta (にほんのうた, Japanese Song)
2012	INFINITY 16 welcomez MINMI & JAY'ED	"Ame Nochi Hare" (雨のち晴れ, Rain then sunny)		—	—	—	MY LIFE
2015	Lugz&Jera feat. Jay'ed	"Be with You"		—	—	—	Sing For Love
2018	AKLO feat. Jay'ed	"Under the Cliff"		—	—	—	Non-Album Singles
2018	RED DIAMOND DOGS feat. DOBERMAN INFINITY, JAY'ED & Mabu	"RED SOUL BLUE DRAGON"	Split single with Exile Atsushi's "Suddenly"	4	—	—	Non-Album Singles
2019	EXILE ATSUSHI, JAY'ED, KAZUKI (DOBERMAN INFINITY) & MABU as MIDNIGHT LONELY BOYZ	"HAZY"	Music card	—	—	—	Non-Album Singles
2020	Leola feat. JAY'ED	"Futari" (ふたり, The Two of Us)	Digital single	—	—	—	Non-Album Singles
2021	Shinnosuke feat. JAY'ED & Lugz&Jera	"Neiro" (音色, Tone)	Digital single	—	—	—	Non-Album Singles
2023	Yusuke (feat. MUMMY-D, JAY'ED, lecca, KIRA & JILLE)	"SHAKE"	Digital single	—	—	—	You are the one
2023	EXILE ATSUSHI, JAY'ED, KAZUKI (DOBERMAN INFINITY) & MABU as MIDNIGHT LONELY BOYZ	"LUNAR"	Digital single	—	—	—	Non-Album Singles
2023	UNI-Qreatives feat. JAY'ED	"Conclusion"	Digital single	—	—	—	Non-Album Singles
2024	OMW, JAY'ED, P-CHO & NAOtheLAIZA	"Fantasy Express"	Digital single	—	—	—	Non-Album Singles

=== Other appearances ===
Release	Artist(s)	Title	Notes	Album
2002	Sphere of Influence feat. L & Jay'ed	"That Girl"		The Influence
2003	Sphere of Influence feat. L-Vocal & Jay'ed & B-Buttafly aka Norisham-X	"That Girl" (Remix)		Walk This Way feat. Sora3000 (single)
2003	DJ Yutaka feat. DJ Kaori, Jay'ed	"Rock the Party"		United Nations III
2003	DOBERMAN INC. feat. L-Vocal & Jay'ed and Spider	"We Got It All"		MEGA CITY FIVE
2004	Norisiam-X feat. Jay'ed	"If I..."		Brave New World
2005	"E"qual feat. Jay'ed	"Live on Direct"		The Rock City
2006	I-Dea feat. Jamosa & Jay'ed	"Fly Away"	Later put on Jamosa's album "One"	Da Front and Back
2006	Wolf Pack feat. Jay'ed & Jazzy Blaze	"So So Good (Sō Sō Gutto....)" (そうそうグっと, Oh yeah.)		Fireomania
2006	Doberman Inc. feat. Jay'ed	"Baby I'm Sorry"		Stop, Look, Listen
2006	Doberman Inc. feat. Jay'ed	"Stop, Look, Listen"		Stop, Look, Listen
2006	"E"qual feat. Jay'ed	"Baby, Baby"		7 Days
2007	Dabo feat. Jay'ed, Twigy	"Hanzoku (I'm So Kool)" (反則, Foul Play)		Dabo Presents B.M.W.: Baby Mario World Vol. 1
2007	I-Dea (performed by Jay'ed)	"I Wouldn't Change a Thing"	Diana Ross cover	Re;cover
2007	Best Of HASE feat. Jay'ed	"ShiningStar (HASE-T Remix)"		Produce Works "BoomBox Vol.1"
2007	Doberman Inc feat. Jay'ed	"Hypnotic"		The Best
2008	10for Efdee feat. Jay'ed	"Letter 2.........."		104: 4 Japanese
2008	DJ Kaori feat. Jay'ed	"You're the Only One"		DJ Kaori's J-Mix II
2008	DJ KOMORI feat. Jay'ed	"Sayonara"		What's R&B ? (Japanese R&B Mix CD)
2008	"E"qual feat. Jay'ed	"Song For You"		TV Crushman & Radio Jacker
2009	Y'S feat. Jay'ed	"Believe"		INTELLIGENT - EP
2009	JAY'ED feat.4WD	"I do"		Supokon - Sports Music Compilation
2009	SEEDA feat. Jay'ed	"Yume Kara Same Tara" (夢からさめたら, If I awake from a dream)		SEEDA
2009	Dj Fumi Yeah! feat. Jay'ed	"Movin' On"		SUGAR SHACK Official soundz mixed by DJ HAL
2009	DJ MAYUMI feat. AK-69, Big Ron and Jay'ed	"This Summertime"		BERRY JAM PARADISE mixed by DJ MAYUMI
2009	TSUYOSHI feat. JAY'ED, LEO, L&J, MICHIYA, Shinnosuke	"Perfect Man"		ALL ABOUT LOVE
2009	HAB I SCREAM feat. COMA-CHI, JAY'ED	"Soulmates"		Palpable
2009	SIMON feat. JAY'ED	"SUPER FLY"		Fine Presents THE HOT SUNSET SUMMER J-MIX by DJ HOKUTO
2009	JAM KANE feat. JAY'ED	"My Destiny"		SPECIAL CODE
2010	Tynisha Keli feat. Jay'ed	"The Right Way"		The 5th Element
2010	Lil' Eddie feat. Jay'ed	"Trouble Sleeping"		City of My Heart - Deluxe Edition
2010	EMI MARIA feat. Jay'ed	"We Standing Strong"		Contrast
2010	AK-69 feat. BIG RON & JAY'ED	"PARADISE"		THE STORY OF REDSTA -RED MAGIC TOUR 2009- Chapter 2
2010	MAY'S feat. JAY'ED	"Close Your Eyes"		Featuring ~Collaboration Best~
2010	JAY’ED feat.RICKIE-G	"Shining Star (HASE-T Remix)"		HASE-T Presents TREASURE HOUSE RECORDS STREET RYDERS
2010	mc2 feat. JAY'ED, CO-KEY & HEARTBEAT	"Sayonara Arigatou" (サヨナラアリガトウ, Goodbye Thank you)		ENERGY
2010	DJ MITSU THE BEATS feat. COMA-CHI & JAY'ED	"Precious Time"		UNIVERSAL FORCE
2010	JAMOSA feat. JAY'ED	"Anata no Mune ni Modoreru Nara" (あなたの胸にもどれるなら, If you can return to your chest)		Luv ~Collabo Best~
2010	DISCOTHEQUE feat. JAY'ED	"LOVELESS ps. Happy X'mas (English ver)"		Goodbye
2011	K.J. with Lisa Halim & JAY'ED	"Aishitemashita. Setsunai Kurai... ." (愛してました、切ないくらい…。, I loved you, it was not enough ... .)		K.J. with...
2011	Hannya feat. JAY'ED	"Yō ga Noboreba" (陽が昇れば, If the sun rises)		BLACK RAIN
2011	JAY'ED as part of SUGAR SHACK FAMILY	"One Last Word"		SUGAR SHACK FACTORY
2011	Jazztronik feat. JAY'ED	"Flash Light"		Dig Dig Dig
2012	JAMOSA feat. JAY'ED & Wakadanna	"Nanika Hitotsu -acoustic ver.-"何かひとつ-acoustic ver.- (Something-acoustic ver.-)		TRY
2012	AKLO feat. JAY'ED	"Soccer(Sakkā)" (サッカー, Soccer)		THE PACKAGE
2012	DJ PMX feat. Jay'ed, Joystickk, Kowichi, Zang Haozi	"My Beauty Queen"		The Original II
2014	AKLO feat. Jay'ed	"The Arrival"		The Arrival
2014	GILLE duet with Jay'ed	"ONE -Kimi ga Iru Riyuu-" (君がいる理由, ONE - Why are you -)	Later put on Jay'ed's album JAY'ED WORKS	TREASURES (Deluxe Edition)
2015	Shimotaku feat. JAY'ED	"Forever Be Mine"		Shimotakunau (シモタクナウ, Simotucknow)
2016	Yusuke feat. JAY'ED	"Ate no nai tegami" (宛てのない手紙, Letter not addressed)		Yū jō BEST (遊情BEST, Playful BEST)
2016	KUBO-C, P-CHO & JAY'ED	"Hell On Earth"		HiGH & LOW ORIGINAL BEST ALBUM
2016	AKLO feat. JAY'ED	"Sāfin(surfing)" (サーフィン, surfing)		Outside the Frame
2016	AKLO feat. JAY'ED	"Your Party"		Outside the Frame
2018	Ms.OOJA feat. JAY'ED	"Asahi no yōna kiss o shite" (朝陽のようなkissをして, Kiss like Chaoyang)		PROUD
2018	JAY'ED & Reina Washio	"How about your love?"		"Utamonogatari - CINEMA FIGHTERS project -" (ウタモノガタリ-CINEMA FIGHTERS project-, Utamonogatari -CINEMA FIGHTERS project-)
2019	JAY'ED	"Neiro" (音色, Timbre)		ANOTHER VOICE -Full Of Harmony Tribute Album-
2021	CrazyBoy feat. JAY'ED	"Sutera" (ステラ, Stella)		Amnesia

== Videography ==
=== As lead artist ===
Year	Album Information	Chart positions	
Year	Album Information	Oricon DVD Charts	Oricon Blu-ray Charts
2010	"LIVE MUSICATION -TOUR 2009 "MUSICATION" & JOURNEY TO NZ-": Released: 31 March 2010; Label: Toy's Factory (TFBQ-18105); Formats: DVD	188	—

=== As featured artist ===
Year	Album Information	Artist(s)	Chart positions	
Year	Album Information	Artist(s)	Oricon DVD Charts	Oricon Blu-ray Charts
2009	"THE CARNIVAL 08’ DVD": Released: 08 April 2009; Label: FOCUS INTERNATIONAL (FIDV-2); Formats: DVD	various artists	—	—
2010	"JUJU 10.10.10 Special Live Request": Released: 22 December 2010; Label: Sony Music Japan (AIBL-9199/200); Formats: DVD	JUJU	45	—
2011	"FREEDOM 2010 in Awajishima "Aozora"": Released: 12 January 2011; Label: Toy's Factory (TFBQ-18112); Formats: DVD	various artists	8	—
2011	"Juroku Shunen Nippon Budokan": Released: 29 June 2011; Label: Far Eastern Tribe Records, Universal Music Japan (UMBF-1017); Formats: DVD	INFINITY 16	33	—
2011	"Are. . . Guzen Desukedo. ": Released: 07 December 2011; Label: Universal Music Japan (SRBL-1509/10, SRXL-23); Formats: DVD, Blu-ray	Yusuke	6	8
2012	"Live Tour 2011 Cruising": Released: 27 February 2012; Label: King Records (KIBM-298); Formats: DVD	MAY'S	20	—
2012	"2012.1.8 Shibuya Public Hall": Released: 06 June 2012; Label: Showa Records (SHWR-0011, SHWR-0012); Formats: DVD, 2DVDs	Hannya	31	—
2014	"O.Y.W.M. TOUR 2013 LIVE at SHIBUYA-AX": Released: 05 February 2014; Label: Lexington Co., Ltd / One Year War Music (OYWM-14001); Formats: DVD	SALU & AKLO	92	—
2015	"JUJU SUPER LIVE 2014 - JUJU-En 10th Anniversary Special - at SAITAMA SUPER ARENA": Released: 11 March 2015; Label: Sony Music Associated Records (AIBL-9316/7, AIXL-52); Formats: DVD, Blu-ray	JUJU	29	31
2017	"HiGH & LOW THE LIVE": Released: 27 February 2017; Label: Rhythm Zone (RZBD-86301/3, RZXD-86304/5, RZBD-86296/8, RZXD-86299/300); Formats: 3DVDs, 2Blu-rays	various artists	1	1
2017	"DOBERMAN INFINITY 3rd Anniversary Concert "iii - three -" ": Released: 04 October 2017; Label: LDH MUSIC (XNLD-10006, XNLD-10008); Formats: 2DVDs, Blu-ray	DOBERMAN INFINITY	6	18
