= Minmi =

Minmi ミンミ
- Born: Michiko Evwana; December 8, 1974 (age 51); Osaka Prefecture, Japan
- Genres: Reggae, hip hop, pop, electropop
- Years active: 1996–present
- Labels: Victor Entertainment 2002–09 (part of JVC); Far Eastern Tribe Records 2009– (part of Universal Music Group)
- Website: www.minmi.jp

Michiko Evwana (born December 8, 1974), better known by her stage name Minmi (Japanese: ミンミ), is a Japanese hip-hop and reggae musician, as well as a singer-songwriter and record producer. She is the first soca artist from Japan. She was married to Wakadanna (若旦那), a member of Japanese reggae group Shōnan no Kaze, from 2007 until their divorce on June 28, 2016.

She began playing reggae music in Japanese clubs in 1996. Her 2002 debut single, "The Perfect Vision", went on to sell over 500,000 copies.

== Biography ==
Michiko Evwana was born in Osaka Prefecture, Japan, on December 8, 1974. She began playing the piano at the age of five, at which time she began to take interest in soul and jazz music. Minmi began her musical career in 1996, performing at rub-a-dub showcases and hip hop events in the clubs of Osaka. She also began to develop her own sound by making her own original tracks around this period. Minmi signed her first recording deal with JVC Records, releasing the reggae song "The Perfect Vision" as her first single in August 2002. Minmi's first single became extremely popular, and was widely accepted and heavily rotated by as many as 20 FM radio stations. "The Perfect Vision," after gradually increasing in popularity, would eventually sell over 500,000 copies. Minmi contributed songwriting and vocals to two theme songs from the popular 2004 anime series Samurai Champloo, including the main ending theme "Shiki no Uta".

In 2005, Minmi released her first soca-influenced song, "Summertime!!," as opposed to her regular reggae and hip-hop sound. Because of this event, she attended the Trinidad and Tobago Carnival in February 2006, performing on stage. In September, she was nominated for best new artist at the Reggae/Soca Music Awards in New York. Minmi attended the festival again in 2007, performing "Sha Na Na (Japanese Wine)" with Machel Montano.

In June 2007, it was suddenly announced that Minmi had married Wakadanna, a member of reggae group Shōnan no Kaze, and was four months pregnant. The two had first met in 2001 in Jamaica, and began dating soon after. In November she gave birth to her first child, a son.

In March 2010, it was announced that Minmi was pregnant with her second child. Her fourth album Mother, released in July when she was roughly eight months pregnant, prominently features her stomach in the photographs. The child, the second boy, was born ten days early on August 4 in New York.

On June 10 and July 22, 2015, Minmi released her seventeenth single "Hologram".

== Bibliography ==
- MINMI. (July 1, 2010), Kise Ki to MAMA, PAPA & BABY Kyo Mama Ni Ai Ni Iku Yo (in Japanese), Tokyo: Kobunsha Publishing, ISBN 978-4-334-90172-1
- MINMI. (August 17, 2013), HOW TO BE A MOTHER VERY x MINMI "Kosodate Shinagara" Maternity no Hibi (in Japanese), Tokyo: Kobunsha Publishing, ISBN 978-4-334-97704-7
- Mao Abe / Miu Sakamoto / Watanabe Atsuko / Akiko Noma / JILL / MINMI / Ueno Miki / Takahashi Miho (December 20, 2017), WOMAN Josei Artist 6 Nin Ga Kataru, Renai, Kazoku, Soshite Ongaku (in Japanese), Tokyo: Rittor Music Inc., ISBN 978-4-845-63173-5

== Discography ==
=== Albums ===
Year	Album Information	Oricon Albums Charts	Reported sales
2003	Miracle: Released: March 19, 2003; Label: Victor Entertainment (VICL-61097); Formats: CD, digital download	2	476,000
2004	imagine: Released: June 30, 2004; Label: Victor Entertainment (VICL-61768); Formats: CD, digital download	3	190,000
2006	Natural: Released: March 29, 2006; Label: Victor Entertainment (VICL-61936, VICL-61914); Formats: CD, digital download	6	100,000
2010	Mother: Released: July 7, 2010; Label: Universal, Far Eastern Tribe Records (UMCF-1040, UMCF-9537, UMCF-9536); Formats: CD, CD+DVD, digital download	5	64,000
2013	I LOVE: Released: July 24, 2013; Label: Universal, Far Eastern Tribe Records (UMCF-1095, UMCF-9634); Formats: CD, CD+DVD, digital download	14	
2014	BAD: Released: September 24, 2014; Label: Universal (UPCH-1988, UPCH-9953); Formats: CD, CD+DVD, digital download	17	
2015	EGO: Released: August 24, 2015; Label: Universal (UPCH-2051, UPCH-7041, D2CJ-1102, D2CJ-1103); Formats: CD, CD+DVD, digital download	28	3,000
2016	Life is Beautiful: Released: July 27, 2016; Label: Universal (UPCH-7168, UPCH-2087); Formats: CD, CD+DVD, digital download	29	
2018	identity: Released: May 23, 2018; Label: Universal (UPCH-2161, UPCH-7415); Formats: CD, CD+DVD, digital download	57	

=== Other albums ===
Year	Album Information	Oricon Albums Charts	Reported sales
2005	Friends: Minmi Featuring Works Best: Collaborations compilation album; Released: September 22, 2005; Label: Victor Entertainment (VICL-61097); Formats: 2CD, digital download	16	71,000
2006	Minmi Natural Show Case 2006 In Zepp Tokyo (Special Edition) - EP: Live special album; Released: December 6, 2006; Label: Victor Entertainment (VICL-62674, VICL-62675); Formats: digital download	—	
2007	The Love Song Collection 2006—2007: 'Love' concept compilation album; Released: November 21, 2007; Label: Victor Entertainment (VICL-62674, VICL-62675); Formats: CD, digital download	3	75,000
2008	Minmi Best 2002—2008: Greatest hits album; Released: November 21, 2007; Label: Victor Entertainment (VIZL-280, VICL-62829/30); Formats: 2CD, 3CD, digital download	2	230,000
2009	Summer Collection with Music Clips: 'Summer' concept greatest hits album; Released: August 19, 2009; Label: Victor Entertainment (VIZL-341); Formats: CD+DVD, digital download	5	38,000
2011	The Heart Song Collection: 'Heart' concept album; Released: August 24, 2011; Label: Universal Music Japan, Far Eastern Tribe Records (UMCF-9591, UMCF-1063); Formats: CD+DVD, digital download	10	
2012	MINMI Best Ame Nochi Niji 2002-2012: Released: August 22, 2012; Label: Universal Music Japan, Far Eastern Tribe Records (UMCF-9616, UMCF-1077); Formats: 2CD, 2CD+DVD, digital download	7	
2014	MINMI BEST "ORIGIN": Released: September 24, 2014; Label: Victor Entertainment (VIZL-736); Formats: CD+DVD, digital download	147	
2015	New MINMI Friends -"Bad" "MINMI" To Iu Neta wo Rapper Track Maker Ga Douryouri Shitanoka-: Released: July 22, 2015; Label: Universal Music Japan (UPCH-2047); Formats: CD, digital download	117	
2017	ALL TIME BEST:ADAM: Released: March 3, 2017; Label: Universal Music Japan (UPCH-2116); Formats: CD, digital download	69	
2017	ALL TIME BEST:EVE: Released: March 3, 2017; Label: Universal Music Japan (UPCH-2117); Formats: CD, digital download	75	

=== Singles ===
==== As lead artist ====
Release	Title	Chart positions			Oricon sales	Album
Release	Title	Oricon Singles Charts	Billboard Japan Hot 100†	RIAJ digital tracks†	Oricon sales	Album
2002	"The Perfect Vision"	4	—	—	353,000	Miracle
2002	"T.T.T."	8	—	—	74,000	Miracle
2003	"Another World"	17	—	—	37,000	Imagine
2004	"Ai no Mi" (アイの実; "Fruit of Love")	19	—	—	15,000	Imagine
2004	"Are Yu Ready"	45	—	—	7,000	Natural
2005	"Summertime!!" (サマータイム!!, Samātaimu!!)	19	—	—	27,000	Natural
2006	"Nishiazabu Densetsu" (西麻布伝説; Nishiazabu Legend)	78	—	—	3,000	Natural
2006	"I Love You Baby"	42	—	—	9,000	Love Song Collection
2007	"Sha Na Na" (シャナナ☆)	17	—	13*	36,000	Love Song Collection
2009	"Ave Maria" (アベマリア, Abe Maria)	14	16	2	18,000	Mother
2009	"Ashita Moshi mo Kimi ga Inai..." (アシタもしもキミがいない...; "What If You're Not There Tomorrow")	25	42	7	7,000	Mother
2010	"Hibiscus" (ハイビスカス, Haibisukasu)	27	30	8	7,000	Mother
2010	"Pa to Hanasaku" feat. Verbal (パッと花咲く; "Blooming with a Bang")	58	70	25	2,000	MINMI Best Ame Nochi Niji 2002–2012
2012	" La La La ~Ai no Uta~" (ラララ 〜愛のうた〜, La La La ~Song of Love)	58	—	—		I LOVE
2012	"Engage Ring" (エンゲージリング)	35	—	—		I LOVE
2013	"Sakura ~Eien~" feat. Shonannokaze (さくら ~永遠~; Cherry Blossom ~Eternity~)	28	—	—		I LOVE
2014	"Ite itai yo" (いていたいよ; I want a lot.)	45	—	—		BAD
2015	"hologram" (ホログラム)	116	—	—		EGO
* charted on monthly Chaku-uta Reco-kyō Chart. †Japan Hot 100 established February 2008, RIAJ Digital Track Chart established April 2009.

==== As featured artist ====
Release	Title	Notes	Chart positions			Oricon sales	Album
Release	Title	Notes	Oricon Singles Charts	Billboard Japan Hot 100†	RIAJ digital tracks†	Oricon sales	Album
2006	"Win and Shine" (Ukarats FC)	Co-wrote lyrics/music.	48	—	—	6,000	We Love We [We Love Winning Eleven]
2007	"Dream Lover" (Infinity 16 welcomez Shōnan no Kaze, Minmi, Moomin)		10	—	5*	74,000	Foundation Rock
2007	"Manatsu no Orion" (真夏のオリオン; "Midsummer Orion") (Infinity 16 welcomez Minmi, 10-Feet)		14	—	27*	25,000	Foundation Rock
2007	"Kiseki" (キセキ; "Miracle") (Teruteru Babys)	Charity single, wrote song/featured vocals.	39	—	—	7,000	
2008	"Dream Mix, Vol. 01" ( INFINITY 16 welcomez Shonan no kaze, MINMI, MOOMIN, 10-FEET, MUNEHIRO)		—	—	—		Non-album single
2008	"Dream Believer (Hoshi ni Negai o)" (星に願いを; "Wishing on a Star") (Infinity 16 welcomez Minmi, Wakadanna & Han-kun from Shōnan no Kaze, Goki)		19	13	11*	14,000	Welcomez
2010	"Kinkyu Jitai" (緊急事態; "Emergency") (RED SPIDER feat. MINMI, HAN-KUN, KENTY GROSS, BES, APOLLO, KIRA, NG HEAD, DOZAN11)		—	—	—		Kinkyu Jitai – One Sound Dance Live 2010
2012	"Ame Nochi Hare " (雨のち晴れ; "Rain then sunny") (INFINITY 16 welcomez MINMI & JAY'ED)		98	—	—		MY LIFE
2013	"Pan Pan Papan" (RED SPIDER feat. feat. Minmi, Kenty Gross, Arm Strong & Bes)		—	—	—		WHAT THE SPIDER
2013	"HANDS UP" (RED SPIDER feat. Minmi, Bes, NG Head, Kenty Gross, Boogie Man & Shingo Nishinari)		—	—	—		WHAT THE SPIDER
2013	"Tokyo" (東京) (Shingo Nishinari feat. MINMI)		—	—	—		Okage-samadesu. (おかげさまです。, I am sorry.)
2016	"Ah Murderz" (RED SPIDER feat. MINMI, BES, APOLLO, KENTY GROSS, J-REXXX, KIRA, NATURAL WEAPON & DOZAN11)		—	—	—		Title is to be announced ～ALL JAPANESE REGGAE DUB MIX CD～
2018	"Slave of Love" (YOSA & TAAR feat. Taichi Mukai & MINMI)		—	—	—		Modern Disco Tours
2018	"All In" (Shella Posse feat. MINMI)		—	—	—		Non-album single
2018	"NO NO" (RED SPIDER feat. MINMI, APOLLO, KENTY GROSS & NATURAL WEAPON)		—	—	—		#compact_disc

==== Digital Singles ====
Release	Title	Notes	Album
2009	"A Natural Woman"	Aretha Franklin cover	Non-album single
2010	"Pink Boushi no "Do Re Mi Fa So"" (ピンク帽子の "ドレミファソ")		The Heart Song Collection
2012	"Teo Teo ~D.I.N.C~" feat. DOBERMAN INC		MINMI Best Ame Nochi Niji 2002–2012
2013	"Sumaho (Season II)" (スマホ （SeasonII）) feat. Shingo Nishinari		New MINMI Friends -"Bad" "MINMI" To Iu Neta wo Rapper Track Maker Ga Douryouri Shitanoka-
2014	"#Yacchaitai" (#ヤッチャイタイ)		BAD
2015	"MOVE"		EGO
2015	"hologram" (ホログラム)		EGO
2018	Winner (Yokohama Futtou Version)	Yokohama F. Marinos Official Half Time Supporting Song	Non-album single

=== DVDs ===
Title	Release date	Oricon rank
Minmi Live Tour 2004 "Imagine" (sunshine)	September 24, 2004	—
Minmi Video Clips 2002—2005: Summer	July 27, 2005	37
Minmi Natural Show Case 2006 in Zepp Tokyo	November 22, 2006	69
Freedom '08	December 3, 2008	17
Minmi Live: Freedom in Awajishima	December 2, 2009	33
LIVE TOUR "Himawari" ～Road to 10th Anniversary～ at Saitama Super Arena	June 27, 2012	36
MINMIDVD	December 24, 2014	127
MINMI LIVE TOUR 2014 "BAD"	May 27, 2015	40

=== Collaborations ===
Title	Artist	Release date
"Tornade"	Silver King	September 2000
"Shot Dem Up"	Jumbo Maatch from Mighty Jam Rock	October 2001
"3 Minute Special"	Silver King	May 22, 2002
"Parasite"	Vader	May 22, 2002
"I Don't Wanna Be Your Friend"	Boogie Man	July 2002
"Journey Into..."	Takafin from Mighty Jam Rock	August 2002
"Cry"	Shōnan no Kaze	July 2003
"Independent Woman"	Pushim	December 17, 2003
"THE ROCK CITY"	Vader	June 2, 2004
"Shiki No Uta"	Nujabes	June 23, 2004
"Irie Music"	Home Grown	August 4, 2004
"Set Mi Free, Let Mi Be"	Home Grown	August 4, 2004
"My Way"	Shōnan no Kaze	August 18, 2004
"Fuu's Theme"	Nujabes	September 22, 2004
"Keep On Steppin'"	SAL The Soul	November 26, 2004
"Rastaman Drive Mi Crazy"	Anthony B	2005
"Day Dreamer"	Munehiro	May 21, 2005
"Cherry Blossom"	10-Feet	April 18, 2006
"Lotta Love"	M-Flo	July 26, 2006
"Sha Na Na – Japanese Wine"	Machel Montano	March 6, 2007
"Happy Today"	Shōnan no Kaze	April 18, 2007
"Spider City (Rock City 3)"	Kenty-Gross	February 7, 2007
"Spider Time (Summer Time!!)"	Kenty-Gross	February 7, 2007
"Missing You"	Minmi	February 7, 2007
"Spider (Aira)"	Minmi	February 7, 2007
"Nande"	Rudebwoy Face	April 25, 2007
"Suirenka"	Shōnan no Kaze	June 6, 2007
"Saving All My Love For You"	Minmi	January 1, 2011
"I'm Your Baby Tonight"	Junior Kelly	April 3, 2012
"Hoshino Raburetaa"	Sergio Mendes	January 1, 2013
"Konoyo ga Yami Dato Iwanaide Okure"	Sambomaster	October 9, 2013
"Nadeshiko (Soul Remix)"	KIRA	February 4, 2015
"Heisei no Otome"	Kenty-Gross	August 26, 2015
"Outta Love"	Che'Nelle	June 14, 2017
"Dame"	DJ SWING & Tarantula	July 5, 2017

== See also ==
- Supa Dups
- Music of Samurai Champloo
