= Hologram (Minmi song) =

- CD and digital EP cover

Single by Minmi

from the album Ego
- B-side: "#Yacchaina"
- Released: July 22, 2015
- Recorded: 2015
- Genre: Dance-pop; EDM
- Length: 4:00
- Label: Universal Music Japan
- Songwriter: Michiko Evwana
- Producer: Evwana

Minmi singles chronology
"Ite Itai yo" (2014)	"Hologram" (2015)	"Friday Night" (2016)

"Hologram" (Japanese: ホログラム;; "hologram") is a song recorded by Japanese recording artist Minmi, taken from her seventh studio album Ego (2015). It was made available for digital download and physical consumption on June 10, 2015 through Universal J—a subsidiary label owned by Universal Music Japan—as her third stand-alone single. "Hologram" marks Minmi's second consecutive recording after "Ite Itai yo" to have been written, composed, arranged, and produced by herself. Musically, the song was described by a critic at Selective Hearing as a transition from her signature reggae music styles to electronic dance music, whilst retaining musical elements of dancehall music.

Upon its release, the single received generally positive reviews from music critics. Some pointed out the track as a highlight from the album, whilst acclaiming the song's composition. Minor criticism was outspoken towards the application of Auto-Tune to her vocals. Commercially, it under-performed in Japan, stalling at number 116 for a sole week on the Oricon Singles Chart, marking her lowest-selling release in that region. To promote the single, it was used for Japanese anime television series Jitsu wa Watashi wa (2015). Additionally, she appeared on Japanese music television shows Count Down TV and Refreshing!, with her as well performing the track at the 2016 Freedom Aozora concert venue.

== Background, composition and release ==
In June 2016, it was confirmed through Anime News Network that Minmi would release a new song titled "Hologram", which would serve as a featured track for the first season of Japanese anime television series, Actually, I Am… (Japanese: Jitsu wa Watashi wa) (2015). "Hologram" marks Minmi's second consecutive single to have been written, composed, arranged, and produced by herself, following her 2014 single "Ite Itai yo". Musically, it was pointed out by a writer for Selective Hearing as a transition from her signature reggae music styles from previous releases to dance-pop and electronic dance music, whilst retaining musical elements of dancehall music. It also incorporates synthesizers and keyboards in its instrumentation, with Minmi's vocals being processed with Auto-Tune and vocoder pyrotechnics.

"Hologram" was released as the singer's third stand-alone digital single on June 10, 2015 through Universal J, a subsidiary label owned by Universal Music Japan; its artwork featured blue, purple, pink and green confetti. The label distributed the recording for physical consumption as a DVD and CD in Japan, with a digital EP being made available in several other territories. All formats included the original mix of the single, with the addition of B-side track "#Yaccahaina" in collaboration with Japanese performer Mary Jane. The DVD release incorporated Minmi performing "Hologram" live at the 2014 Freedom Aozora concert venue. The accompanying cover sleeve for all three formats portrayed a pink-haired Minmi surrounded by digitally-superimposed confetti.

== Reception ==
Upon its release, the single received positive reviews from music critics. AllMusic's Adam Greenberg, who contributed to Mimni's biography on the website, cited the track as one of her best works. In a similar review, CD Journal staff members pointed out "Hologram" as a highlight from her album Ego. Another critic from the same publication commended Minmi's transition to electronic dance music, labeling the recording's production as "bold" and "spacey". The review further acclaimed the singer's vocals and songwriting on the single. An editor from Selective Hearing enjoyed the track, concluding that, "In the end this is a slight deviation from Minmi's typical releases, but it's also refreshing to hear her branch a little bit." However, the publication negatively perceived the overuse of Auto-tune in the track and felt the corresponding B-side songs were better than the single. Commercially, "Hologram" under-performed in Japan. It debuted at number 116 for a sole week on the Oricon Singles Chart, marking Minmi's lowest-charting release since "La La La (Ai no Uta)" (2012), which peaked at number 58. As of July 2016, it is her lowest-selling single according to Oricon Style's database.

== Music video and promotion ==
An accompanying music video for "Hologram" was directed by Hideharu Ueki. It opens with a woman walking down a beach front, with her subsequently holding and letting go of her bikini strap by the pre-chorus. Over the rest of the visual, she is portrayed being engaged alone or with a man in the water or playing around the beach shore; several of the scenes repeat throughout the music video. The clip appeared on the DVD version of its parent album, Ego. To promote the single, it was used for Japanese anime television series Jitsu wa Watashi wa (2015). She also appeared on the Japanese television music shows Count Down TV and Refreshing! to perform the song, alongside providing an interview in each show. Minmi subsequently performed "Hologram" live at the 2016 Freedom Aozona concert venue; various other Japanese acts, such as Scandal and 10-Feet, were present at the venue.

== Credits and personnel ==
Credits adapted from the CD liner notes of "Hologram".

Management

- Management done by record label Universal J.

Credits

- Minmi – lead vocals, producing, composing, songwriting, mixing, arranging
- Mary Jane – featured artist, backing vocals
- Hideharu Ueki – music video director

== Track list and formats ==
All lyrics written by Minmi.

Digital download
No.	Title	Lyrics	Music	Arrangement	Length
1.	"Hologram" (ホログラム)	Michiko Evwana	Michiko Evwana	Evwana	4:05

CD single / digital EP
No.	Title	Lyrics	Music	Arrangement	Length
1.	"Hologram" (ホログラム)	Evwana	Evwana	Evwana	4:05
2.	"Hologram" (Asashi Kuromine version)	Evwana	Evwana	Evwana	5:03
3.	"#Yacchaina" (featuring Mary Jane)	Evwana	Evwana	Evwana	4:20

Bonus DVD
No.	Title	Director	Length
1.	"Hologram" (ホログラム)	Hideharu Ueki	4:05
Total length:			4:05

== Charts ==
Chart (2015)	Peak position
Japan (Oricon)	116

== Release history ==
Region	Date	Format	Label
Japan	June 10, 2015	Digital download	Universal J
Australia	June 10, 2015	Digital download	Universal J
New Zealand	June 10, 2015	Digital download	Universal J
United Kingdom	June 10, 2015	Digital download	Universal J
Ireland	June 10, 2015	Digital download	Universal J
Germany	June 10, 2015	Digital download	Universal J
Spain	June 10, 2015	Digital download	Universal J
France	June 10, 2015	Digital download	Universal J
Italy	June 10, 2015	Digital download	Universal J
Taiwan	June 10, 2015	Digital download	Universal J
Japan	July 22, 2015	CD	Universal J
Japan	July 22, 2015	DVD	Universal J
Japan	July 22, 2015	Digital EP	Universal J
Australia	July 22, 2015	Digital EP	Universal J
New Zealand	July 22, 2015	Digital EP	Universal J
United Kingdom	July 22, 2015	Digital EP	Universal J
Ireland	July 22, 2015	Digital EP	Universal J
Germany	July 22, 2015	Digital EP	Universal J
Spain	July 22, 2015	Digital EP	Universal J
France	July 22, 2015	Digital EP	Universal J
Italy	July 22, 2015	Digital EP	Universal J
Taiwan	July 22, 2015	Digital EP	Universal J
