= Shōjaku Station =

Railway station in Settsu, Osaka Prefecture, Japan

Shōjaku Station 正雀駅
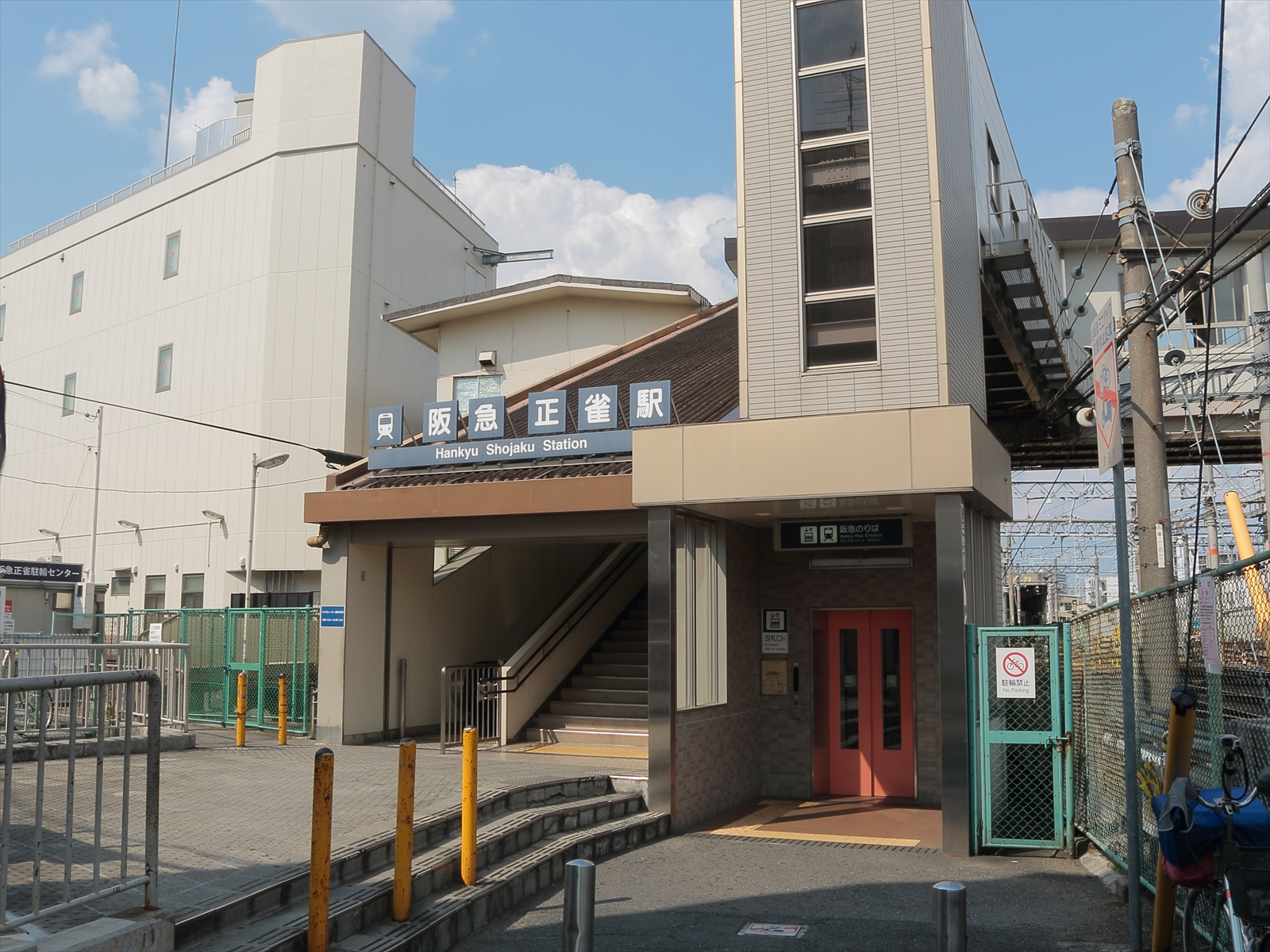
- A part of station building

General information
- Location: Hankyū Shōjaku, Settsu, Osaka （大阪府摂津市阪急正雀） Japan
- Coordinates: 34°46′33.81″N 135°32′46.07″E
- Operator: Hankyu Railway
- Line: Kyōto Main Line
- Tracks: 4

Construction
- Structure type: Elevated
- Accessible: Yes

Other information
- Station code: HK-66

History
- Opened: 16 January 1928

Services
Preceding station	Hankyu Railway	Following station
Aikawa towards Osaka-umeda	Kyōto Main Line Local	Settsu-shi towards Kyoto-kawaramachi
Location

Shōjaku Station (正雀駅, Shōjaku eki; station number: HK-66) is a railway station on the Hankyu Kyoto Line and is in Hankyu Shojaku, Settsu, Osaka. It serves students of the nearby Osaka Gakuin University. Only local trains stop at the station.

The station adjoins a yard and a workshop of Hankyu Railway.

== Layout ==
The station has 2 island platforms serving 2 tracks each, and one track connecting to Shojaku Depot and Workshop, located in the north of Line 2 served by the eastbound platform.

Local trains for Umeda and Tengachaya arrive at Line 5 during the non-rush hour to let limited express trains and semi-express trains pass Line 4.

2	■ Kyoto Line	for Takatsuki-shi and Kyoto (Kawaramachi) starting for Umeda in the early morning
3	■ Kyoto Line	for Takatsuki-shi and Kyoto (Kawaramachi)
4, 5	■ Kyoto Line	for Umeda, Tengachaya, Kita-Senri, Kobe, and Takarazuka

== History ==
The station opened on 16 January 1928.

Station numbering was introduced to all Hankyu stations on 21 December 2013 with this station being designated as station number HK-66.
