= Emi Maria =

Papua New Guinean–Japanese R&B singer-songwriter (born 1987)

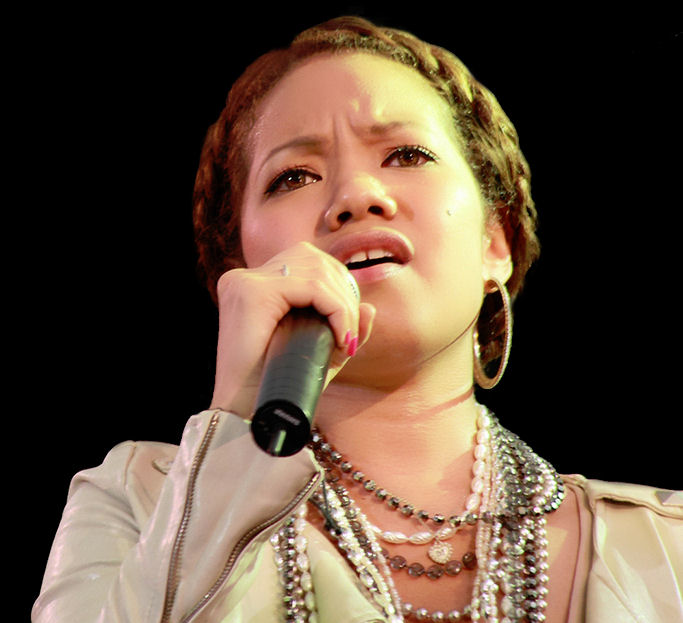
- Emi Maria performing at the Hibiki Music Festival 2009.

Background information
- Born: 9 June 1987 (age 38); Bougainville Island, Papua New Guinea
- Origin: Kobe, Japan
- Genres: Pop, R&B
- Occupation: Singer-songwriter
- Years active: 2006–present
- Labels: Freest Inc. (2007); K.S.R. (2008); Victor Entertainment (2009–present)

Emi Maria (stylized as EMI MARIA; born 9 June 1987) is a Japanese and Papua New Guinean R&B singer-songwriter who debuted in 2007 with the EP Between the Music.

== Biography ==
Emi Maria was born in 1987 in Papua New Guinea. Her mother is Japanese, while her father is Papua New Guinean. She spent the first five years of her life in Papua New Guinea, before moving to Kobe in Japan.

She first started listening to R&B at 6 due to her sister, listening to such artists as Janet and Michael Jackson, and K-Ci & JoJo. She began writing lyrics in junior high school. By high school, she had started writing music and producing her own tracks. She participated in the MTV Star Tour, and started performing lives in the Kansai area from 2006 onwards. In 2007, she started appearing on many different Japanese urban artists' albums as a guest artist, such as Seeda and MC Moggy.

In 2007, Emi Maria released her first EP, Between the Music on Freest Inc., a label she had created for herself. Her debut single "I Gotta (Summer Kiss)" was picked as the iTunes Japan single of the week in August 2008.

She debuted as a major label artist in 2009, with the release of a digital single "One Way Love" under Victor Entertainment. During this time, she had some of her highest profile collaborations. "Luv Is..." was a song Emi Maria performed with R&B singer Jay'ed, which features on his top 10 album Musication. In December, she had her first top 10 hit, as a featured artist on Seeda's single "Wisdom", which reached number 8 on the Oricon singles charts. After the release of her first physical single in 2010, "Show Me Your Love", Emi Maria released her first major label album, Contrast.

== Discography ==
=== Albums ===
Year	Album information	Oricon Album charts
2008	A Ballad of My Own: Released: 5 November 2008; Label: K.S.R. (KCCD-347); Formats: CD, digital download	44
2010	Contrast: Released: 3 March 2010; Label: Victor Entertainment (VICL-63538); Formats: CD, digital download	50
2011	Blue Bird: Released: 9 March 2011; Label: Victor Entertainment (VICL-63712); Formats: CD, digital download	151
2014	In My World: Released: 5 February 2014; Label: Village Again (B00H7OBCMC); Formats: CD, digital download	—
2015	Euphoria: Released: 20 May 2015; Label: Village Again, KSR Corp. (B00VHN9F9Q); Formats: CD, digital download	—

=== Extended plays ===
Year	Album Information	Oricon Album charts
2007	Between the Music: Released: 24 October 2007; Label: Freest Inc. (FRUR-001); Formats: CD, digital download	—
2008	iTunes Live from Tokyo: Released: 8 October 2008; Formats: Digital download	—
2010	Cross Over: Released: 17 November 2010; Label: Victor Entertainment (VICL-63685); Formats: CD, digital download	166

=== Singles ===
==== As lead artist ====
Release	Title	Notes	Chart positions			Album	
Release	Title	Notes	Oricon Singles Charts	Billboard Japan Hot 100	RIAJ digital tracks*	Album	
2008	"I Gotta (Summer Kiss)"	Appears as a remix on album	—	—	—	A Ballad of My Own	
2008	"Ai to Yume no Aida de" (愛と夢のあいだで; "In Between Love and Dreams")	Radio single, music video filmed	—	55	—	A Ballad of My Own	
2009	"One Way Love"	Digital download	—	37	—	Contrast	
2010	"Show Me Your Love"		141	27	31	Contrast	
2010	"We Standing Strong" feat. Jay'ed	Digital download	—	—	—	Contrast	
2010	"Summer Night Bxxxh / Change My Life (Red Spider Dub)"	Digital download	—	—	—	—	
2010	"Mr. Alien"	Digital download	—	—	—	Cross Over	
2010	"Mirror"	Digital download	—	—	—	Cross Over/Blue Bird	
2010	"Nobody Like You"	Digital download	—	—	—	Cross Over/Blue Bird	
2011	"A.S.A.P. (Imasugu ni Kaketsukete)" (A.S.A.P.～今すぐに駆けつけて; "Run to Me A.S.A.P.")	Digital download	—	—	—	Blue Bird	
2011	"Proud"	Digital download	—	—	—	Blue Bird	
2017	"Lost in Tokyo"	—	—	—	—		"—" denotes that the song was not released in that format, or it did not chart. *Japan Hot 100 established February 2008, RIAJ Digital Track Chart established April 2009.

==== As featured artist ====
Release	Title	Notes	Chart positions			Album
Release	Title	Notes	Oricon Singles Charts	Billboard Japan Hot 100	RIAJ digital tracks	Album
2008	"Flash"; DJ Komori feat. Chie (Foxxi Misq), Emi Maria	Digital download	—	—	—	What's R&B?
2009	"Wisdom"; Seeda feat. Ill-Bosstino, Emi Maria		8	—	—	Seeda Best

=== Other appearances ===
Release	Title	Notes	Album
2007	"In da Club"; Tomogen feat. Emi Maria, GS (Doberman Inc.), Yūgi (Infumiaikumiai)		06 Out Side
2007	"Free"; I-Dea (performed by Emi Maria)	Deniece Williams cover	Re;cover
2007	"Tropical" (トロピカル, Toropikaru); MC Moggy feat. Wolf Pack, Emi Maria		Katrina
2008	"2 My Fans"; 10forefdee feat. Kayzabro, Emi Maria		104: 4 Japanese
2008	"Tropical" (トロピカル, Toropikaru); Wolf Pack feat. MC Moggy, Emi Maria		Gold Experience
2008	"Yume no Konseki" (夢の痕, Dream Traces); Hannya	Background vocals.	Doctor Tokyo
2008	"Sky55"; L-Vokal feat. Emi Maria		Free
2009	"Luv Is..."; Jay'ed feat. Emi Maria		Musication
2009	"My Life Is One Way..."; Urali feat. Emi Maria		Departure
2009	"2 My Fans" (Live); 10forefdee feat. Kayzabro, Emi Maria	DVD release.	10forefdee Release Tour Final
2009	"I Gotta (Winter Kiss)" (Live); Emi Maria	DVD release.	10forefdee Release Tour Final
