= Osaka Kun-ei Women's College =

Private women's junior college in Settsu

- 大阪薫英女子短期大学
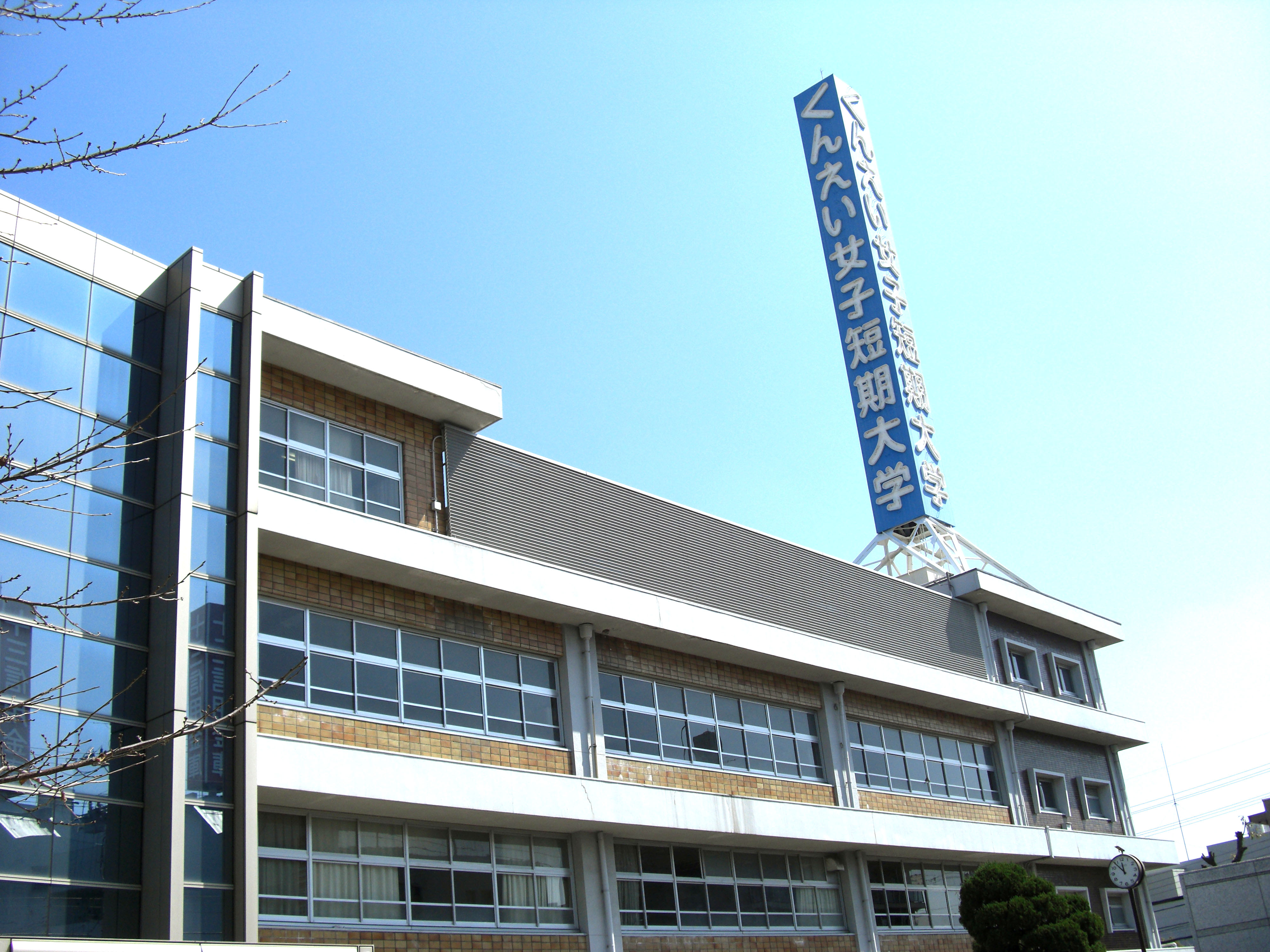
- Main building
- Type: Private
- Active: 1966–2013
- Parent institution: Kun-ei Gakuen
- Location: Settsu, Osaka, Japan; 34°46′39.5″N 135°33′1.1″E

Osaka Kun-ei Women's College (大阪薫英女子短期大学, Ōsaka kunei joshi tanki daigaku) is a private women's junior college in Settsu, Osaka, Japan, established in 1966.
