= Sarina Suzuki =

Japanese actress, singer and tarento

- Born: Kanako Munehiro; July 13, 1977 (age 49); Settsu, Osaka, Japan
- Other name: Munehiro
- Occupations: Actress, gravure model, singer
- Years active: 1994–present
- Height: 1.65 m (5 ft 5 in)
- Spouse: Tela-C (m. 2008; div. 2013)
- Children: 1

Sarina Suzuki (鈴木 紗理奈; born July 13, 1977) is a Japanese actress, singer, tarento and former gravure idol.

== Career ==
Born in Osaka, Suzuki debuted first as a gravure idol in 1994. She soon became active on television variety shows, notably serving as a regular on Ninety-nine's hit show Mecha-Mecha Iketeru! from 1996. She has also been active as a singer, with one of her singles, "Share ni nannai", peaking at number 22 on the Oricon Singles Chart in 1997. She later began recording reggae music under the name Munehiro, with one album, Neo, reaching number 26 on the Oricon Albums Chart in 2009. She won the Best Lead Actress in a Foreign Language Film at the Madrid International Film Festival in 2017.

== Personal life ==
In December 2008, Suzuki married Tela-C (Infinity 16), a reggae musician whom she met through a friend's introduction, after five years of dating. She announced her pregnancy in September 2009, and the couple held their wedding ceremony at Meiji Shrine on November 15. On February 23, 2010, she gave birth to her first child, a baby boy. The couple divorced on December 3, 2013, and she took custody of her son.
