= Osaka University of Human Sciences =

Coordinates: 34°46′39.5″N 135°33′1.1″E

Osaka University of Human Sciences (大阪人間科学大学, Ōsaka ningen kagaku daigaku) is a private university in Settsu, Osaka, Japan. It is not the same as Osaka University, which is a National University and also hosts a Faculty of Human Sciences. The predecessor of the school was founded in June 1933, and it was chartered as a university in 2001.
