= Home Made Kazoku =

Japanese hip hop band

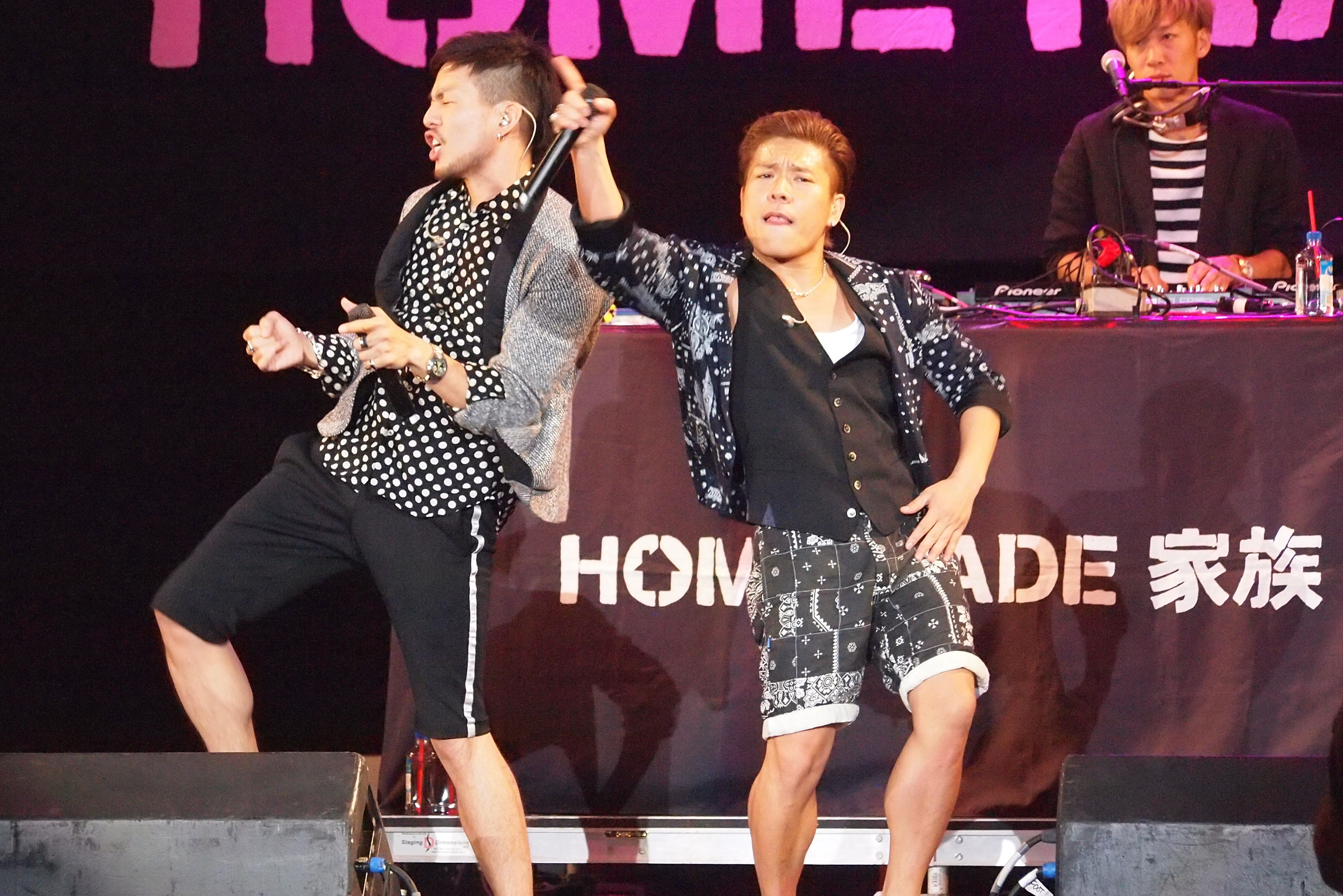
- Home Made Kazoku in 2013

Background information
- Also known as: Hoze Kuro Sanbo, H.M.K.U
- Origin: Nagoya, Japan
- Genres: Hip-hop; pop rap
- Years active: 1996–2016; 2026–present
- Label: Ki/oon
- Members: Micro; Kuro; DJ U-Ichi
- Past members: Hoze (1996–2001)
- Website: home-made.jp

Home Made Kazoku (HOME MADE 家族; literally "Home Made Family") is a Japanese hip hop trio from Nagoya, formed in 1996. They are signed to Ki/oon Records, a subsidiary of Sony Music. The group took a hiatus from 2016 until 2026.

== History ==
Home Made Kazoku is a trio consisting of members Micro, Kuro, and DJ U-Ichi. The band was originally formed in 1996 the name Hoze Kuro Sambo (HOZE KURO サンボ) as part of the hip-hop group Funhouse. Micro joined the group in 1999 and Hoze left in 2001 to form the duo HB, with the remaining members renaming the band to Home Made Kazoku.

Vocalists Micro and Kuro are Japanese-Americans originally from Louisville, Kentucky and Chicago, Illinois respectively.

From 2001 to 2003, the band performed in various Nagoya nightclubs. Shortly after being signed on through local radio station Zip-FM, the trio released the album Home Sweet Home, from which its similarly titled song became one of the most requested songs on Japanese radio stations for the rest of the year.

In early 2004, the band was chosen to be part of a country-wide tour known as the Japan Club Tour. During the tour, the trio gained a large portion of their Japanese fanbase, and were also signed on by the recording company, Ki/oon Records. The trio made their major debut with the release of their mini-album Oooh! Yeah! (Oooh! 家～!, Oooh! Iē!). In July 2004, Home Made Kazoku released their first single, Summer Time Magic, which ranked 15th on the Oricon record charts for nearly 10 weeks.

After a series of singles, including Thank You!!, which was used as the second ending theme for the anime Bleach, and Shōnen Heart, as well as the second opening theme for the anime Eureka Seven, the band's first full-length album was released "Rock the World". "Rock the World" entered the Oricon charts. The record was in fifth place on the Oricon chart for its first week, and would stay in top 20 for the next eight weeks. Rock the World sold 191,744 copies and became the 78th best selling album of 2005.

After their first album, the group went on several tours and concomitantly released several singles. They also released their second and third albums, "Musication" and "Familia".

Of special note, tickets to their second tour were sold out within the span of one hour, a record in Japanese music. In January 2007, it was announced that they would perform the first ending theme to the anime Naruto Shippūden entitled Nagareboshi Shooting Star which entered the Oricon charts at 10th place. One of the member, Micro, was featured on the Abingdon Boys School song "Lost Reason" as it appeared on their self-titled album.

Home Made Kazoku has performed for a promotional commercial for a product called "Walky Walky" with their song "Easy Walk". In addition, Home Made Kazoku's single, No Rain No Rainbow, is the movie theme for the second Naruto Shippūden movie.

In 2011, Home Made Kazoku returned to Naruto Shippūden for the third time with the song "Freedom", which was the 17th ending theme.

The band played their first show in the US at Otakon 2010 in Baltimore, MD, and returned for Otakon 2013 alongside T.M. Revolution.

Their official blog stated in August 2016 that the trio will go on indefinite hiatus by the end of the year. According to the comment by group member Micro, the group is taking a hiatus to "grow individually and take on new challenges." The group's members have since been pursuing solo careers, including DJ U-Ichi's work on his YouTube channel and Kuro working with former member Hoze on the soul group Enband.

== Style ==
Home Made Kazoku usually displays a very up-beat mood in their music, sometimes described by fans as "feel-good music". The pace of the songs may vary from moderately slow and calm to moderately fast and energetic. Like many Japanese pop bands, the group makes use of English phrases within the music. This use is rather extensive, as nearly every song contains some amount of English. Most songs utilize the language in the refrain as well as in isolated instances throughout a song.

The subject matter of the music usually concerns love, family, peace, harmonious communication with others, fun, and summer festivities. Additionally, most of the music videos seem to take place in the spring or summer, hearkening back to their up-beat mood and liveliness.

When asked what they want listeners to take away from hearing their music, they responded saying that no matter where you come from or the color of your skin, we are all one big family. When asked which American artist they would most like to collaborate with, the group showed interest primarily in hip-hop and pop artists. Micro would most like to work with The Black Eyed Peas, Kuro with Stevie Wonder and U-Ichi with Jay-Z.

== Discography ==
=== Albums ===
1. H.M.K.U (2001)
2. Mainichi ga Eiga no you na Hitokoma ～Life Is Beautiful～(2002)
3. Home Sweet Home (2004)
4. Rock the World (May 11, 2005)
5. Musication (February 15, 2006)
6. Familia (March 14, 2007)
7. Home (October 8, 2008)
8. Circle (March 3, 2010)
9. AKATSUKI (September 28, 2011)
10. 3RISE (September 12, 2012)
11. Laughin' Road (February 11, 2015)

=== Compilations ===
1. Heartful Best Songs (February 6, 2008)
  1. "Thank You!!" (サンキュー!!, Sankyū!!)
  2. "Oboeteru" (おぼえてる。, I Remember)
  3. "Hero" (Strings Ver.) (ヒーロー, Hīrō)
  4. "Koi no Decibel" (恋のデシベル, Decibels of Romance)
  5. "Salvia no Tsubomi" (サルビアのつぼみ, Salvia Buds)
  6. "Kimi ga Kureta Mono" (君がくれたもの, The Thing You Gave)
  7. "Itsumo Itsudemo" (いつもいつでも, Forever and Always)
  8. "Futari ga Ii ne" (二人がいいね, It's Good to Be Together)
  9. "Yonaita ni Kaita Rabu Retā" (夜中に書いたラブレター)
  10. "Manabi no Ma do" (学びの窓, Studying the Window Pane)
  11. "Merry-go-Round" (メリーゴーランド, Merī-gō-Rando)
  12. "Nagareboshi: Shooting Star" (流れ星 ～Shooting Star～, Nagareboshi ～Shooting Star～)
  13. "Life Goes On & On" (Extended Ver.)
  14. "Home Sweet Home" (Reform)
  15. "Homesick" (ホームシック, Hōmushikku)
  16. "Encore Symphony" (アンコール シンフォニー, Ankōa Shinfonī)
1. Family Tree~Side Works Collection Vol. 1~
  1. "Wait for Me" (feat. Arikawa Kotomi)
  2. "I Say Yeah" (feat. PUSHIM, RHYMESTER, MAY J & MABOROSHI)
  3. abingdon boys school – "Lost Reason" (feat, Micro)
  4. FLOW – "Night Parade" (feat. Home Made Kazoku)
  5. Sowelu – "Let's Go Faraway" (feat. Micro) (Mine-Chang Remix)
  6. SOFFet – "Minus to Plus" (feat. Kuro)
  7. HB – "Haru No Hakuchuumu" (feat. Home Made Kazoku)
  8. Noriyuki Makihara – "Honno Sukoshi Dake" (feat. Kuro)
  9. TUT-1026 – "yume tabi" (feat. Micro)
  10. "Little-Gradation" (feat. Micro, SHOGO & SMALLEST)
  11. "Fun House" (Fickle Remix) (feat. KAME, HOZE & TUT-1026)
  12. Shimoneta & DJ Taki-Shit – "Funky Technician" (feat. Home Made Kazoku) (Fickle Remix)
  13. KAME &L.N.K. - "Shi Go To Jin" (feat. TUT-1026 & Micro)
  14. "Aikotoba Wa Abracadabra" (feat. Kome Kome Club)

=== Singles ===
1. "Summer Time Magic" (July 7, 2004)
  1. "Summer Time Magic"
  2. "Mr. Tough Guy"
  3. "Oooh! Yeah!"
2. "Aikotoba" (アイコトバ, Aikotoba; Password) (November 17, 2004)
  1. "Aikotoba"
  2. "Hero"
  3. "Home Party"
3. "Thank You!!" (サンキュー！！) (January 26, 2005)
  1. "Thank You!!"
  2. "Home Sweet Home" (Reborn)
4. "On the Run" (March 2, 2005)
  1. "On the Run"
  2. "Live On Direct pt.2"
  3. "Adrenaline"
5. "Shōnen Heart" (少年ハート, Shōnen Hāto; Young Boy's Heart) (August 3, 2005)
  1. "Shōnen Heart"
  2. "Sora to Umi no Deau Tokoro"
  3. "Shōnen Heart" (Instrumental)
6. "Joyride" (October 5, 2005)
  1. "Joyride"
  2. "Manabi no Ma do"
  3. "Life Work!"
  4. "Joyride" (Instrumental)
7. "Salvia Bud/You'll Be Alright" with Noriyuki Makihara (サルビアのつぼみ / You'll be alright with 槇原敬之, Sarubia no Tsubomi/You'll Be Alright With Makihara Noriyuki) (January 18, 2006)
  1. "Salvia no Tsubomi"
  2. "You'll Be Alright" with Noriyuki Makihara
  3. "Nani ga ta desu ka?"
  4. "Salvia no Tsubomi" (Instrumental)
  5. "You'll Be Alright" with Noriyuki Makihara (Instrumental)
8. "Aikotoba wa Abra Cadabra/Manatsu no Dance Call" (アイコトバはア・ブラ・カダ・ブラ ～HOME MADE 家族 vs 米米CLUB～ / 真夏のダンスコール, Aikotoba wa A-bura-kada-bura ~HOME MADE Kazoku tai Kome Kome CLUB~/Manatsu no Dansu Kōru) (July 12, 2006)
  1. "Aikotoba wa Abra Cadabra Home Made Kazoku vs. Komekome Club"
  2. "Manatsu no Dance Call"
  3. "Precious Season"
  4. "Aikotoba wa Abra Cadabra Home Made Kazoku vs. Komekome Club" (Instrumental)
  5. "Manatsu no Dance Call" (Instrumental)
9. "I Say Yeah!" (October 4, 2006)
  1. "I Say Yeah!" (Micro, May J., Pushim, Kuro, C. Ricketts, S. Sasaki, J. Yamamoto)
  2. "I Say Yeah!" (DJ BOBO JAMES RMX)
  3. "I Say Yeah!" (Breakthrough Remix)
  4. "I Say Yeah!" (Fickle Remix)
10. "Everybody Needs Music" (November 22, 2006)
  1. "Everybody Needs Music"
  2. "Silver Town"
  3. "Tera Incognita Shirarezarutochi"
  4. "What's Going On"
11. "Kimi ga Kureta Mono" (君がくれたもの; What You Gave Me) (January 31, 2007)
  1. "Kimi ga Kureta Mono"
  2. "Never Enough"
  3. "Salvia no Tsubomi Liga Oriente" Remix
12. "Nagareboshi Shooting Star" (流れ星 ～Shooting Star～) (March 7, 2007) 1st Naruto Shippūden Ending Theme
  1. "Nagareboshi Shooting Star"
  2. "Yonaka ni Kaita Love Letter"
  3. "Nagareboshi Shooting Star" (Instrumental)
13. "Oboeteru" (おぼえてる; I Remember) (January 16, 2008)
  1. "Oboeteru"
  2. "Rise & Shine"
  3. "Everybody Needs Music" (raw phat remix)
14. "Easy Walk" (April 8, 2008)
  1. "Easy Walk"
  2. "Iron Soul" (アイアンソウル★, Aian Sōru)
  3. "Viva Jibun" (VIVA自分)
15. "No Rain No Rainbow" (July 23, 2008)
  1. "No Rain No Rainbow"
  2. "Frontier" (フロンティア, Furontia)
  3. "I Wish"
16. "Come Back Home" (September 3, 2008)
  1. "Come Back Home"
  2. Ikkagen (一家言, "Personal Opinion")
  3. "Easy Walk" (DJ Deckstream Remix)
17. "You 〜あなたがそばにいる幸せ〜" (You ~Anata ga soba ni Iru Shiawase~, You ~Happiness Around You) (March 11, 2009)
  1. "You 〜あなたがそばにいる幸せ〜"
  2. "Fun House" ft. Kame (from Kame & L.N.K.), Tut-1026, & Hoze (from Smells Good)
  3. "Clap! Clap!"
18. "Tomorrow" featuring Kusuo (November 4, 2009)
  1. "Tomorrow" featuring Kusuo
  2. "Mukaikaze" (ムカイカゼ, Headwind)
  3. "Looking for You"
  4. "Silver Town"
19. "L.O.V.E." (February 10, 2010)
  1. "L.O.V.E."
  2. "Step by Step"
  3. "Shōnen Heart" (Fickle Remix)
20. "Nukumori" (ぬくもり, Warmth) (October 27, 2010)
  1. "Nukumori"
  2. "Mirai Ōrai" (未来オーライ)
  3. "Nukumori" (Instrumental)
21. "Freedom" (June 1, 2011)
  1. "Freedom"
  2. "No Rain No Rainbow" (Fickle Remix)
  3. "Freedom" (Instrumental)
  4. "Freedom" (Opening Mix)(Only Limited Edition)
22. "Kohaku Iro ni Somaru Kono Machi wa" (琥珀色に染まるこの街は, Amber in This city) (January 25, 2012)
  1. "Kohaku Iro ni Somaru Kono Machi wa"
  2. "Across the Universe"
23. "Kibun wa Marude Jackpot!" (気分はまるでJackpot!, Feeling Yourself Like A Jackpot!) (May 30, 2012)
  1. "Kibun wa Marude Jackpot!"
  2. "Oiegei" feat. Min'na-san (お家芸 feat. みんなさん)
24. "Love is..." feat. Ms.OOJA (August 8, 2012)
  1. "Love is..." feat. Ms.OOJA
  2. "メモリーレーン"
25. "Kimi Ga Ita Kara" (July 31, 2013)
  1. "Kimi Ga Ita Kara"
  2. "Summer Born!!!!"
  3. "Sun Shade Love"
  4. "N.A.M.A"
  5. "Kimi Ga Ita Kara" (Instrumental)
  6. "N.A.M.A." (Instrumental)
26. "Hashiri Tsuzukeru" (October 23, 2013)
  1. "Hashiri Tsuzukeru"
  2. "Syncopation"
  3. "Hajimari No Kane"
  4. "N.A.M.A." Remix (feat. Seamo)
  5. Hashiri Tsuzukeru-Instrumental-
  6. "N.A.M.A." Remix (feat. Seamo)-Instrumental-
27. "Yokorenbo" (January 14, 2015)
  1. "Yokorenbo"
  2. "You Choose"
  3. "Kodona"
  4. "N.A.M.A." (Remix) (feat. Nobodyknows+)

=== DVDs ===
- Live 2005 "Rock the World" ～はじめての家族旅行～ in 名古屋
- Home Made Films Vol.1
- Home Made Films Vol.2
- Home Made Films Vol.3
- I Say Yeah! NeOSITE 10th Anniversary Party@Shibuya AX 2006/10/27
- Tour 2006 "Musication" ～平成十八年度・新学期家族大歓迎会～ in Zepp Tokyo
- TOUR 2007 "FAMILIA" ～Heisei 19 Nendo Shiawase Kazokuka Keikaku～ in SHIBUYA AX
