= Boku ga Ichiban Hoshikatta Mono =

Single by Noriyuki Makihara

from the album Explorer
- Released: July 28, 2004
- Genre: Pop
- Length: 5:40
- Label: Toshiba EMI
- Songwriter: Noriyuki Makihara

Noriyuki Makihara singles chronology
"Yasashii Uta ga Utaenai" (2004)	"Boku ga Ichiban Hoshikatta Mono" (2004)	"Akenai Yoru ga Kuru Koto wa Nai" (2005)

Audio sample
- file; help

"Boku ga Ichiban Hoshikatta Mono" (僕(ぼく)が一番(いちばん)欲(ほ)しかったもの; lit. "What I Wanted the Most") is a song recorded by Japanese singer-songwriter Noriyuki Makihara. It was released as a single by Toshiba EMI on July 28, 2004. It is the theme song to the AX drama series Last Present: Musume to Ikiru Saigo no Natsu (ラストプレゼント 娘と生きる最後の夏), starring Yūki Amami. The song was later used in commercials for Systena. "Boku ga Ichiban Hoshikatta Mono" was first recorded as "The Gift" by Blue, a bonus track from their album Guilty. The song was later self-covered by Makihara and released as a single from the album Explorer (2004).

== Chart performance ==
"Boku ga Ichiban Hoshikatta Mono" debuted at number 9 on the Oricon Singles Chart with 22,000 copies sold. It dropped to number 17 the following week, selling 11,000 copies. The single held onto the top twenty one last week at number 20, with 10,000 copies sold in its third charting week. "Boku ga Ichiban Hoshikatta Mono" charted for sixteen weeks on the Oricon Singles Chart, selling a reported total of 81,000 copies during its run.

== Track listing ==
All lyrics are written by Noriyuki Makihara, except 2 with English lyrics by Thane Camus; all music is composed by Noriyuki Makihara.

No.	Title	Arranger(s)	Length
1.	"Boku ga Ichiban Hoshikatta Mono" (僕が一番欲しかったもの, "What I Wanted the Most")	Noriyuki Makihara	5:40
2.	"What I Wanted the Most."	Makihara	5:40
3.	"Boku ga Ichiban Hoshikatta Mono" (Backing Track)	Makihara	5:39
Total length:			16:59

== Charts ==
Chart (2004)	Peak position
Japan Weekly Singles (Oricon)	9
Japan Monthly Singles (Oricon)	23

== Certifications ==
Region	Certification	Certified units/sales
Japan (RIAJ) Physical single	Gold	100,000^{^}
Japan (RIAJ) PC download	Gold	100,000^{*}
Japan (RIAJ) Full-length ringtone	Gold	100,000^{*}
Japan (RIAJ) Streaming	Platinum	100,000,000^{†}
^{*} Sales figures based on certification alone.^{^} Shipments figures based on certification alone.
