= Munehiro =

- Gender: Male

Origin
- Origin: Japanese
- Meaning: Different meanings depending on the kanji used

Munehiro (written: 宗弘 or 宗広) is a masculine Japanese given name. Notable people with the name include:

- Date Munehiro (伊達 宗広; 1802–1877), Japanese samurai and writer
- Munehiro Kaneko (金子 宗弘; born 1968), Japanese decathlete
- Yūki Munehiro (結城 宗広; 1266–1339), Japanese military figure

== Other uses ==
- MUNEHIRO, the name used by the Japanese actress Sarina Suzuki when recording as a reggae artist
