= Reggae/Soca Music Awards =

American music award

The Reggae/Soca Music Awards were first presented in 1994 by its founder Winsome 'Lady C' Charlton at The Bailey Concert Hall in Davie, South Florida. The Awards became a reality after years of deliberation, pondering and due to the lack of recognition for reggae and soca music in the United States despite its continued popularity.

The ceremony consists of twenty five awards in various categories namely vocalists, DJs, producers, albums, songs, record labels, instrumentals, videos, and many more.
