= Musication =

Studio album by Home Made Kazoku
- Released: February 15, 2006
- Recorded: 2005
- Genre: J-pop, hip hop, funk
- Length: 60:38
- Label: Ki/oon
- Producer: Home Made Kazoku

Home Made Kazoku chronology
| Rock the World (2005) | Musication (2006) |

Singles from musication
- 1. "Shōnen Heart" Released: August 03, 2005; 2. "JOYRIDE" Released: October 05, 2005; 3. "Salvia no Tsubomi" Released: January 18, 2006

Musication is the second album by the Japanese hip-hop group Home Made Kazoku, released in 2006. The album reached #3 on the Oricon Albums Chart, making it the highest charted album of the group.

== Background ==
After their previous successful album Rock the World, the group recorded their next album in 2005. Their first single Shōnen Heart (which was used as the second intro theme for the TV anime Eureka 7) reached #14 on the Oricon weekly charts. The group released Joyride in October 2005, reached #20 on the weekly charts. Salvia no Tsubomi which they released in January 2006, was the highest charted single of the album, reached #12 and charted for eleven weeks. Of special note, tickets to their "Musication" tour in 2006, were sold out within the span of one hour, a record in Japanese music.

== Track listing ==
| No. | Title | Writer(s) | Length |
|---|---|---|---|
| 1. | "Journey in 2 H.M.K.U" (Intro) | KURO, MICRO, U-ICHI | 2:16 |
| 2. | "music & communication" | MICRO, KURO, U-ICHI | 3:20 |
| 3. | "Young Boy's Heart" (少年ハート) | KURO, Takahiro Watanabe, MICRO, U-ICHI | 3:55 |
| 4. | "Lean On Me" | KURO, Takahiro Watanabe, MICRO, U-ICHI | 4:38 |
| 5. | "JOYRIDE" | KURO, Takahiro Watanabe, MICRO, U-ICHI | 4:38 |
| 6. | "Take it easy" | KURO, MICRO, U-ICHI | 4:53 |
| 7. | "Bud of the Salvia" (サルビアのつぼみ) | KURO, Takahiro Watanabe, MICRO, U-ICHI | 5:32 |
| 8. | "FUNKY 20×8" | KURO, MICRO, U-ICHI | 4:52 |
| 9. | "Shall we Dance Wild!?" (Shall we 乱舞!?) | MICRO, KURO, U-ICHI | 4:21 |
| 10. | "I Love The Mic Check 1,2" (愛しのマイクチェック1、2) | MICRO, KURO, U-ICHI | 4:52 |
| 11. | "Always, Anytime" (いつもいつでも) | KURO, Kazunori Fujimoto, MICRO, U-ICHI | 4:56 |
| 12. | "R.A.I.N.B.O.W." | MICRO, KURO, U-ICHI | 4:33 |
| 13. | "You'll be alright" (featuring Noriyuki Makihara) | MICRO, KURO | 4:57 |
| 14. | "happy days ~happy days~" (happy days ～幸せな日々～) | KURO, MICRO, U-ICHI | 4:50 |
| Total length: | | | 60:59 |
