= Minami Settsu Station =

Monorail station in Settsu, Osaka Prefecture, Japan

Coordinates: 34.7653°N 135.5687°E

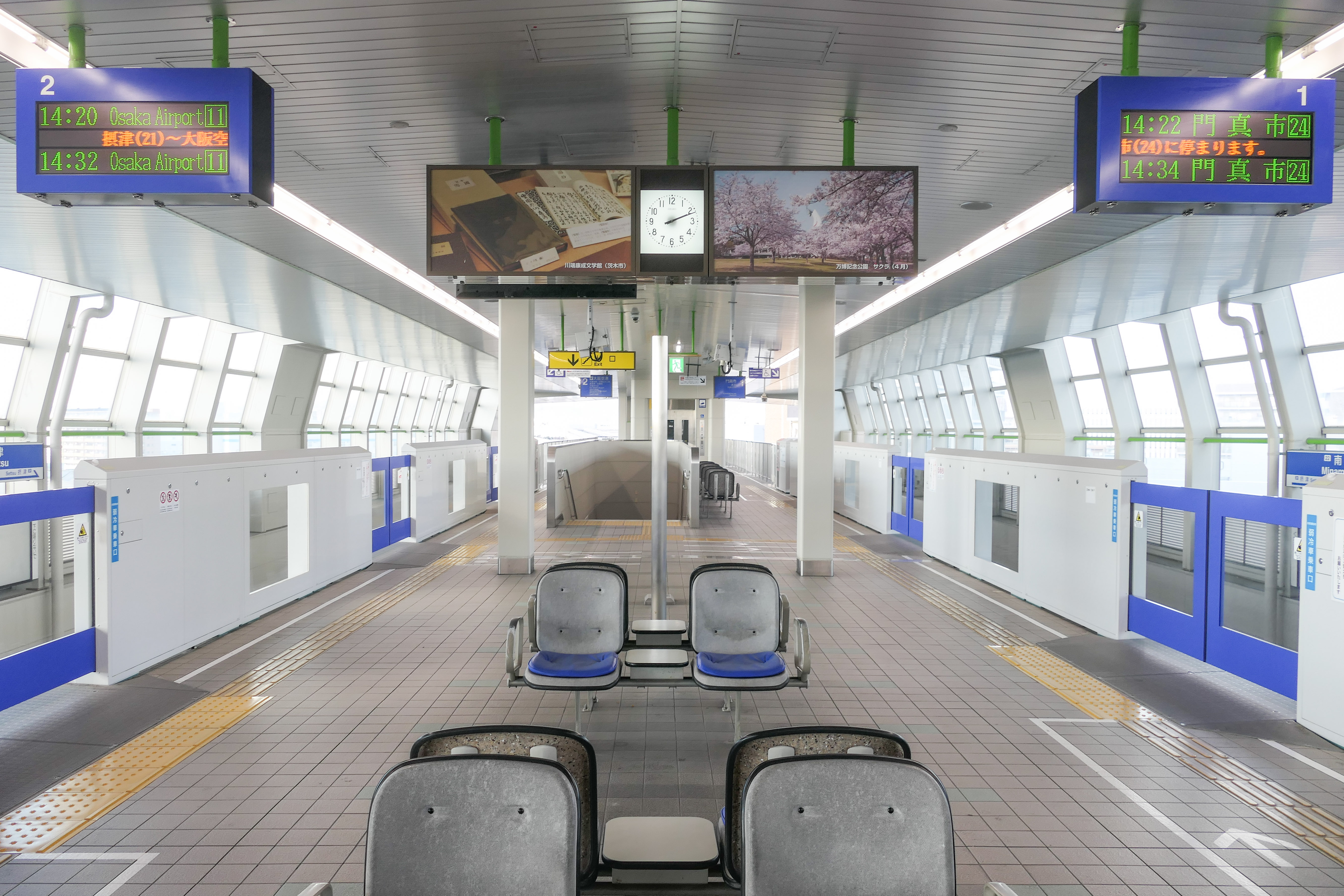
Station platform, December 2024

Minami Settsu Station (南摂津駅, Minami Settsu-eki) is a monorail station on the Osaka Monorail located in Settsu, Osaka, Japan.

== Lines ==
- Osaka Monorail Main Line (Station Number: 22)

== Layout ==
There is an island platform and two tracks elevated. The platform is sealed in with glass walls and doors.

1	■ Osaka Monorail Main Line	for Kadomashi
2	■ Osaka Monorail Main Line	for Osaka Airport

== History ==
Minami Settsu Station opened on 22 August 1997 when the Osaka Monorail Main Line was extended from Minami Ibaraki to Kadoma-shi.

== Adjacent stations ==
«	Service	»
Osaka Monorail Main Line (22)
Settsu (21)	-	Dainichi (23)
