= Settsu-shi Station =

Railway station in Settsu, Osaka Prefecture, Japan

Settsu-shi Station 摂津市駅
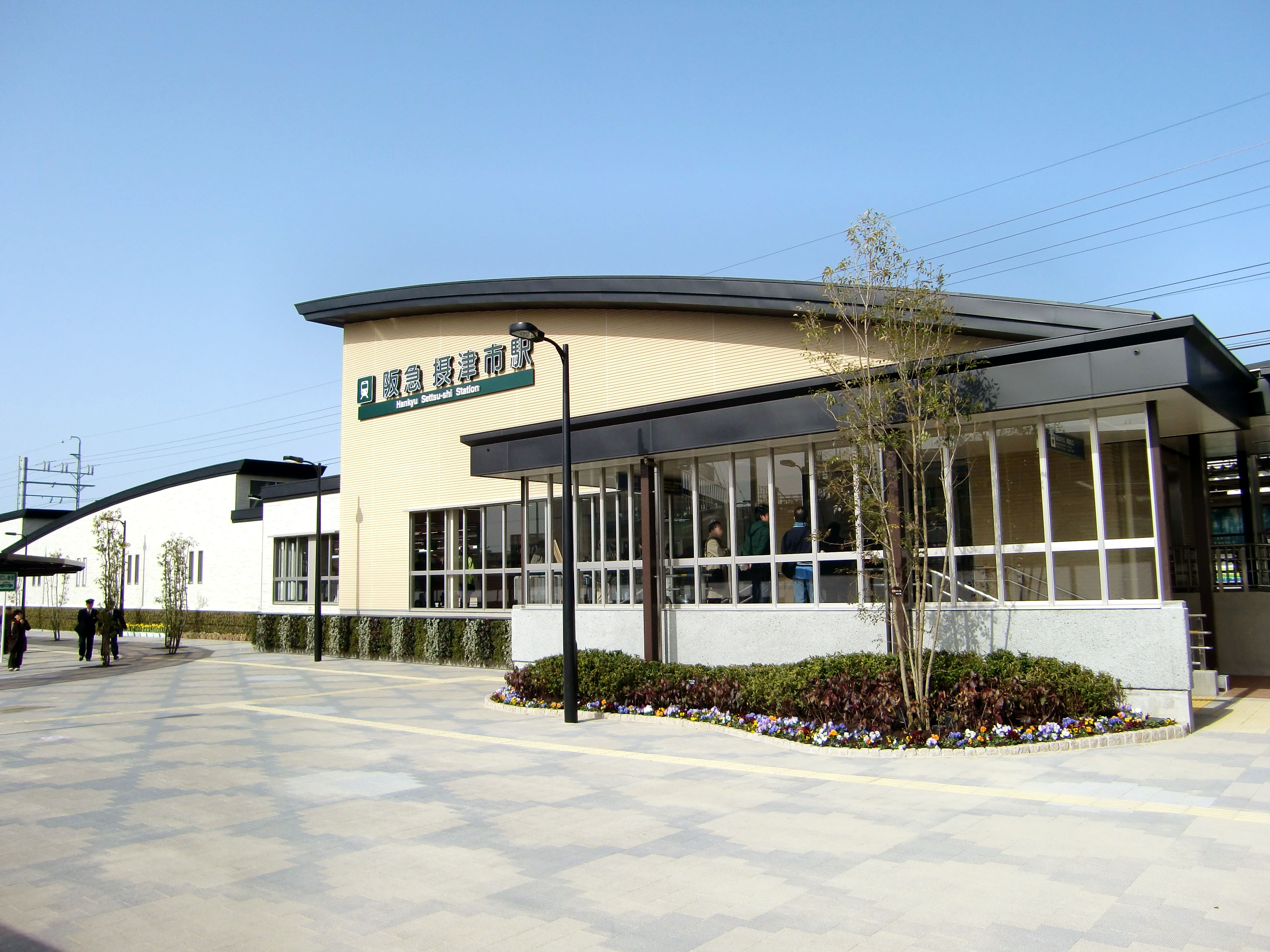
- East side of the station

General information
- Location: 1-1, Senrioka-higashi Yonchome, Settsu, Osaka （大阪府摂津市千里丘東四丁目1-1） Japan
- Coordinates: 34°47′11.18″N 135°33′13.36″E
- Operator: Hankyu Corporation
- Line: Kyōto Main Line
- Platforms: Side platforms
- Tracks: 2

Construction
- Structure type: At grade
- Accessible: Yes

Other information
- Station code: HK-67

History
- Opened: 14 March 2010
Location

Settsu-shi Station (摂津市駅, Settsushi-eki; station number: HK-67) is a railway station on the Hankyū Kyōto Main Line in Settsu, Osaka, Japan. The newest station of the Hankyu system as of 2010 was built for a redevelopment area and is designed as the country's first ever carbon neutral station.

== Line ==
- Hankyu Railway
  - Kyōto Main Line

The station is served by local trains on the Kyōto Main Line. All higher types of trains pass the station.

== Layout ==
The station has two side platforms, connected to each other by an underground passage, serving two tracks. Each platform has a ticket gate that serves each side of the station.

| 1 | ■ Kyōto Line | for Takatsuki-shi and Kyōto (Kawaramachi, Arashiyama) |
| 2 | ■ Kyōto Line | for Umeda, Tengachaya, Kita-Senri, Kōbe and Takarazuka |

== Carbon neutrality ==
The station was featured as the first ever carbon neutral railway station in Japan. According to an estimate in 2008, the station would emit 65 tons of carbon dioxide per year. To make the station carbon neutral, the railway company would reduce this figure by 35 tons by technical measures such as usage of solar power, regeneration by elevators, and reduction of water usage. The remaining 30 tons would be offset by the purchase of carbon credits and so forth.

== History ==
Settsu-shi Station opened on 14 March 2010.

Station numbering was introduced to all Hankyu stations on 21 December 2013 with this station being designated as station number HK-67.

== Adjacent stations ==
| « | Service | » |
|---|---|---|
| Shōjaku (HK-66) | Local | Minami-Ibaraki (HK-68) |
Others: Does not stop at this station
