= Settsu Station =

Monorail station in Settsu, Osaka Prefecture, Japan

Settsu Station 摂津駅
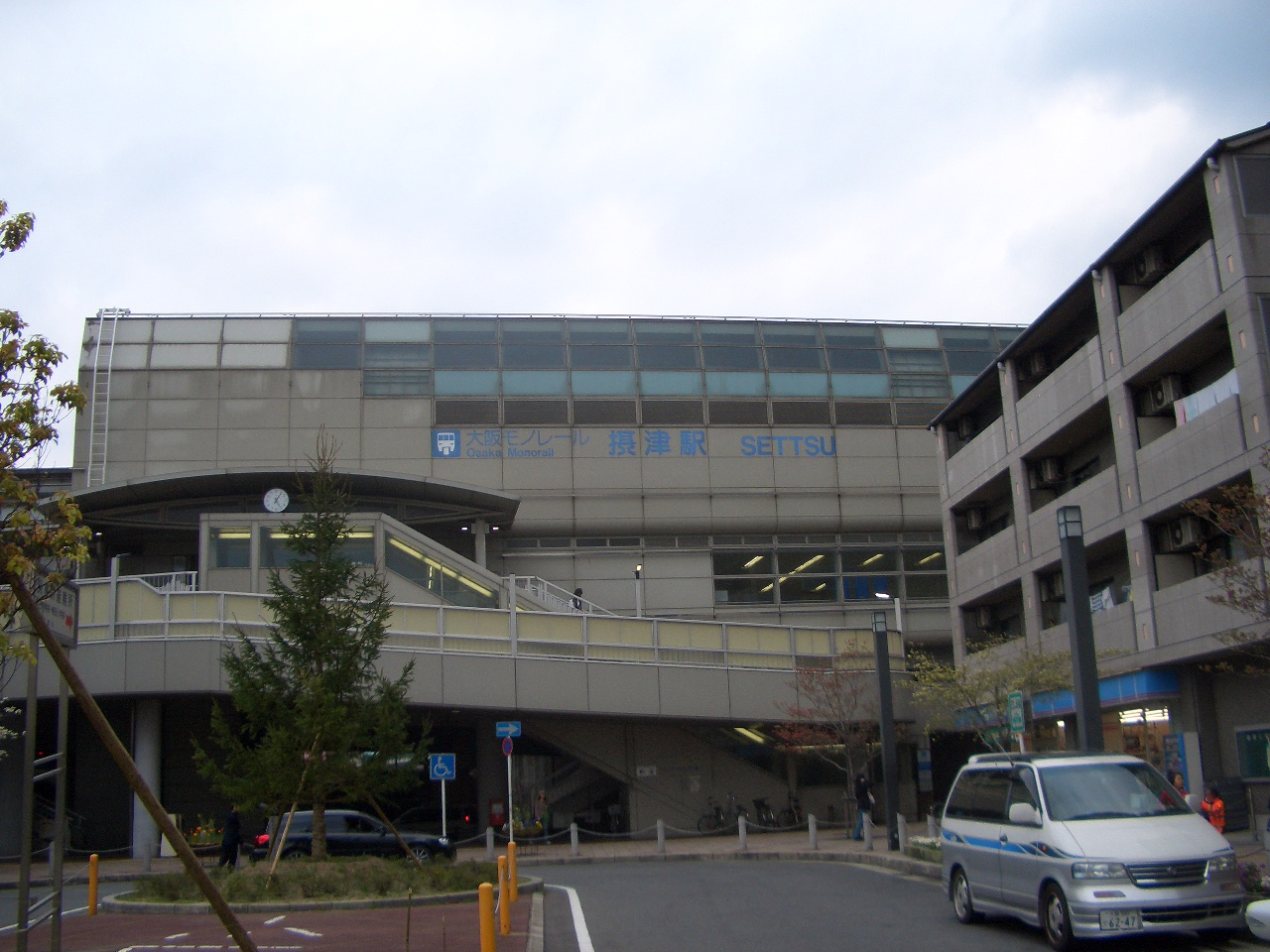
- Station building

General information
- Location: Japan
- Coordinates: 34°46′48.64″N 135°33′40.93″E
- Operator: Osaka Monorail
- Line: Main Line
- Platforms: 1 - Island platform
- Tracks: 2

Construction
- Structure type: Elevated
- Accessible: Yes

Other information
- Station code: 21
- Website: Official website

History
- Opened: 22 August 1997
Location

Settsu Station (摂津駅, Settsu-eki) is a monorail station on the Osaka Monorail located in Settsu, Osaka, Japan.

== Lines ==
- Osaka Monorail Main Line (Station Number: 21)

== Layout ==
There is an island platform and two tracks elevated. The platform is sealed in with glass walls and doors.

1	■ Osaka Monorail Main Line	for Kadomashi
2	■ Osaka Monorail Main Line	for Osaka Airport

== History ==
Settsu Station opened on 22 August 1997 when the Osaka Monorail Main Line was extended from Minami Ibaraki to Kadoma-shi.

== Adjacent stations ==
«	Service	»
Osaka Monorail Main Line (21)
Sawaragi (20)	-	Minami Settsu (22)
