= Settsu, Osaka =

Settsu 摂津市
- City
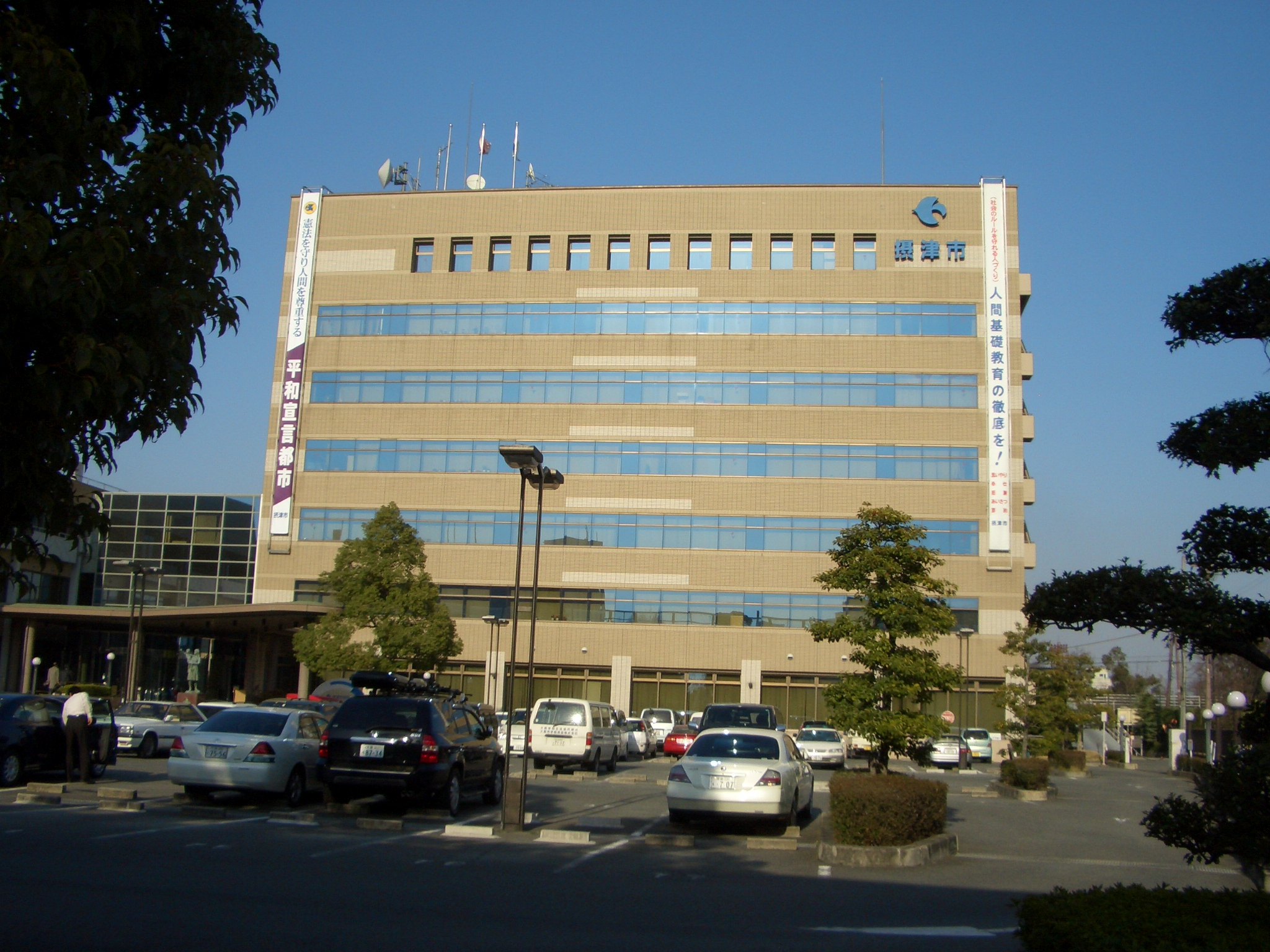
- Settsu City Hall

- Flag Seal
- Location of Settsu in Osaka Prefecture

- Location in Japan
- Coordinates: 34°46′38″N 135°33′44″E
- Country: Japan
- Region: Kansai
- Prefecture: Osaka

Government
  - Mayor: Kōichirō Shimano <嶋野浩一朗> (from October 2024)

Area
  - Total: 14.87 km^{2} (5.74 sq mi)

Population (October 1, 2022)
  - Total: 85,290
  - Density: 5,736/km^{2} (14,860/sq mi)
- Time zone: UTC+09:00 (JST)
- City hall address: 1-1-1 Mishima, Settsu-shi, Ōsaka-fu 566-8555
- Website: Official website
- Symbols
- Flower: Azalea
- Tree: Camphor laurel

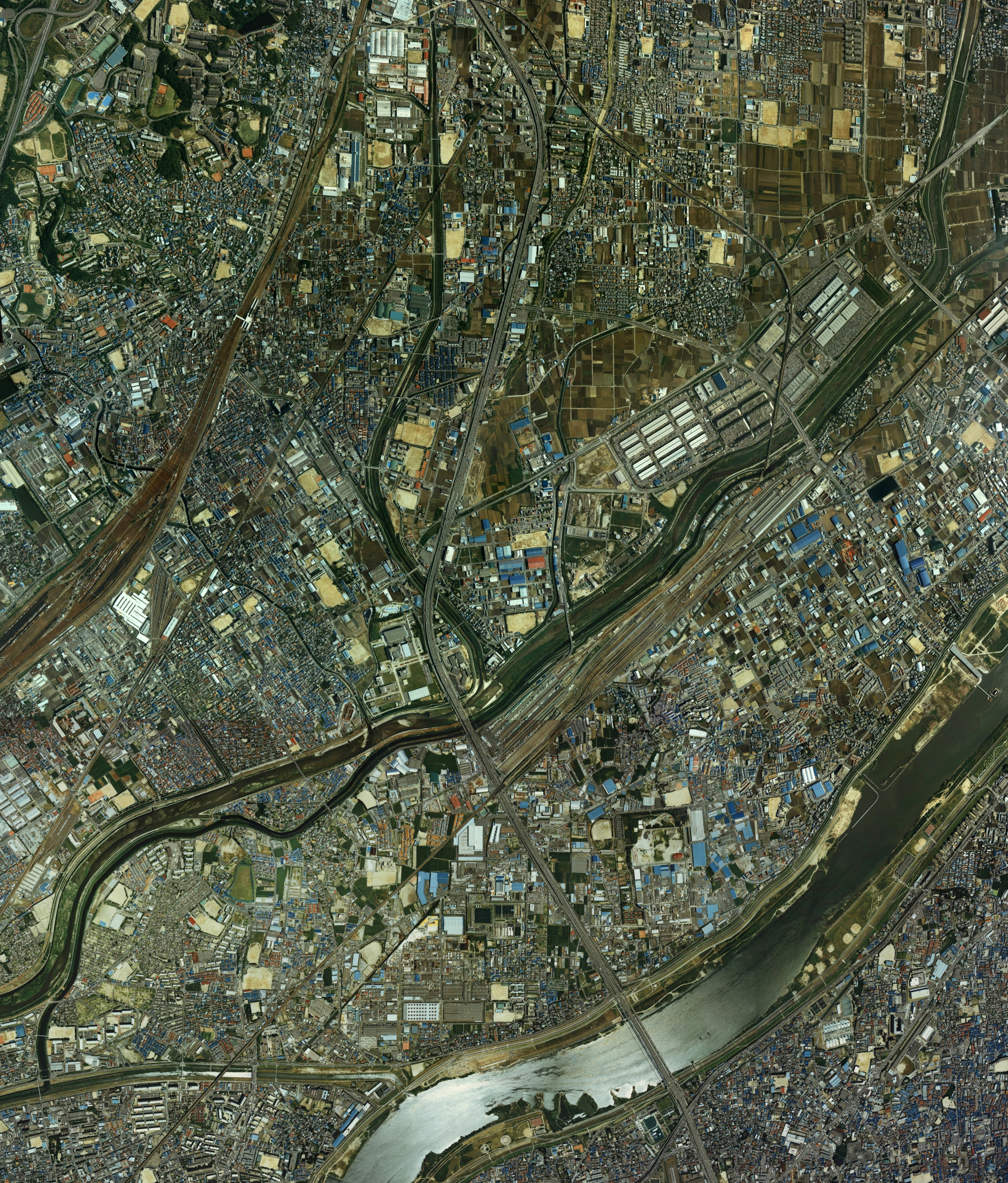
Aerial photograph of Settsu city center

Settsu (摂津市, Settsu-shi; Japanese pronunciation: [sè̞t̚.t͡sɨ́, sé̞t̚.t͡sɨ̀, sè̞t̚.t͡sɨ̥.ɕì]) is a city located in Osaka Prefecture, Japan. As of 1 October 2022, the city had an estimated population of 87,143 in 40,825 households and a population density of 5700 persons per km^{2}. The total area of the city is 14.87 square kilometres (5.74 sq mi). It is a suburban city of Osaka City and a part of the Kyoto-Osaka-Kobe metropolitan area.

== Geography ==
Settsu is located on the right bank of the Yodo River in the north-central part of Osaka Prefecture. The city limits are shaped like a wedge or square. The Hankyu Kyoto Line and the Tokaido Main Line (JR Kyoto Line) run east–west through the northern end of the city, and the Osaka Monorail runs north–south through the center of the city. The Yodo River flows from the northeast to the west at the southern end of the city, and the Kanzaki River splits from the Yodo River at the boundary with Higashiyodogawa-ku, Osaka at the southwestern end. In addition, the Ai River flows east and west through the center of the city. The whole city is flat with alluvial plains made up of deposits from the Yodo and Ai rivers, and there are no mountains or hills.

=== Neighboring municipalities ===
Osaka Prefecture

- Higashiyodokawa
- Ibaraki
- Moriguchi
- Neyagawa
- Settsu
- Suita
- Takatsuki

== Climate ==
Settsu has a humid subtropical climate (Köppen Cfa) characterized by warm summers and cool winters with light to no snowfall. The average annual temperature in Settsu is 15.1 °C. The average annual rainfall is 1475 mm with September as the wettest month. The temperatures are highest on average in August, at around 27.1 °C, and lowest in January, at around 3.7 °C.

== Demographics ==
Per Japanese census data, the population of Settsu has remained relatively steady over the past 50 years.

Historical population
Year	Pop.	±%
1960	24,360	—
1970	60,116	+146.8%
1980	80,684	+34.2%
1990	87,453	+8.4%
2000	85,065	−2.7%
2010	83,696	−1.6%

== History ==
The area of the modern city of Settsu was within ancient Settsu Province. In 785 AD, Wake no Kiyomaro constructed a canal between the Yodo River and the Kanzaki River in what is now Settsu, and the Heian period Emperor Uda built a village in what is now the Torikai neighborhood of Settsu. During the Sengoku period, the area was part of the holdings of Oda Nagamasu, the younger brother of Oda Nobunaga. During the Edo Period, the area was divided between the direct holdings of the Tokugawa shogunate and the holdings of Takatsuki Domain and Shibamura Domain. Following the Meiji restoration, the village of Mishima was established with the creation of the modern municipalities system on April 1, 1889. Mishima merged with Torikai and Mibu villages to form the town of Mishima on September 30, 1956. On November 1, 1966 Mishima was raised to city status and changed its name to Settsu.

== Government ==
Settsu has a mayor-council form of government with a directly elected mayor and a unicameral city council of 19 members. Settsu contributes one member to the Osaka Prefectural Assembly. In terms of national politics, the city is part of Osaka 7th district of the lower house of the Diet of Japan.

== Economy ==
Settsu was traditionally known for a variety of eggplant. Modern Settsu is a regional commercial center and distribution hub for northern Osaka. Due to its proximity to the Osaka metropolitan area, it is also a commuter town. The city also has a growing and very diverse industrial base, including a major rolling stock factory for the Central Japan Railway Company and also for Hankyu Railway.

== Education ==
Settsu has ten public elementary schools and five public middle schools operated by the city government and one public high school operated by the Osaka Prefectural Department of Education. There are also one private middle school and two private high schools. The prefecture also operates two special education schools for the handicapped. The Osaka University of Human Sciences and the Osaka Kun-ei Women's College are located in Settsu.

== Transportation ==
=== Railway ===
JR West – JR Kyōto Line

- Senrioka

Hankyu Railway Hankyu Kyoto Line

- Settsu-shi - Shōjaku

Osaka Monorail - Main Line

- Settsu - Minami Settsu

=== Highway ===
- Kinki Expressway

== Sister cities ==
- Bengbu, Anhui, China, sister city agreement since 1984
- Bundaberg, Queensland, Australia, sister city agreement since 1998

== Notable people from Settsu ==
- Keisuke Honda, football player
- Yosuke Ishibitsu, football player
- Sarina Suzuki, singer and actress
- Kazuyoshi Tatsunami, baseball player
