= Aikawa Station =

Aikawa Station is the name of two train stations in Japan:

- Aikawa Station (Akita) in Kitaakita, Akita Prefecture
- Aikawa Station (Osaka) in Higashiyodogawa-ku, Osaka
