= Noriyuki Makihara =

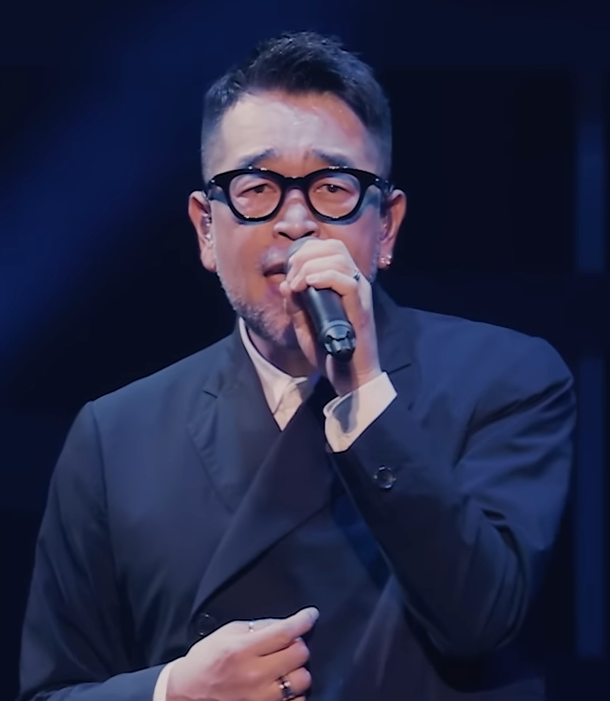
- Makihara on the Time Traveling Tour, 2024

Background information
- Also known as: Mackey
- Born: 槇原 範之; Makihara Noriyuki; 18 May 1969 (age 57); Takatsuki, Osaka, Japan
- Genre: Pop
- Occupation: Singer-songwriter
- Instrument: Vocals
- Years active: 1990–present
- Labels: River Way (1990–1997, 1998–1999, 2000–2001, 2002, 2004); SME Records (1997, 1998, 1999–2000, 2002); Toshiba-EMI (2004, 2006); J-More (2007–2011); Buppu Records/Sony Music Distribution (2011–)
- Website: MakiharaNoriyuki.com; BuppuLabel.com
- Makihara's singing voice (2024) Makihara performs "Answer" at the Tokyo International Forum during the Time Traveling Tour

Noriyuki Makihara (槇原 敬之, Makihara Noriyuki), nicknamed Mackey (マッキー) by his fans, is a Japanese pop singer-songwriter. He has sold a total of 21 million copies in Japan alone.

== Biography ==
Makihara was born on 18 May 1969 in Takatsuki, Osaka, Japan. He attended Aoyama Gakuin University to study English literature. In addition to creating songs for his own music career, he has written, produced and performed songs for many other artists, the most notable being SMAP's "Sekai ni Hitotsu Dake no Hana". He is ranked at No.84 in a list of Japan's top 100 musicians, provided by HMV. He was invited to write the song "The Gift" for English band Blue in their album Guilty.

Makihara made his debut to the J-pop scene in the early '90s after performing on a televised song competition program. He made a name for himself with the release of songs such as "Mou Koi Nante Shinai" (もう恋なんてしない) and "Donna Toki mo" (どんなときも), both of which, among several others, are covered to this day by current popular artists (including English-language covers by various American artists). Some of his music has been translated into other languages, and "Donna Toki mo" specifically has been remixed by Bemani artists "Dream Line Out" for use on Konami's Beatmania game series.

Much of his music's lyrical content has revolved around romantic love, though themes of profound joy, reminiscence, gratitude and deeper spiritual aspects of the human condition have become predominant in recent years.

In 1999, he was given a suspended 18-month prison sentence for possession of amphetamines.

In 2003 he became famous for composing "Sekai ni Hitotsu Dake no Hana" (世界に一つだけの花, "The One and Only Flower in the World"), which was recorded by Japanese boy band SMAP and sold millions.

On 13 February 2020, Makihara was arrested for alleged illegal stimulant possession, as police found 0.083 gram of stimulant at his condominium in Tokyo's Minato Ward in April 2018. On 2 August 2020, Makihara was sentenced to two years in prison, suspended for three years by the Tokyo District Court.

== In popular culture ==
In December 2025, Makihara became viral in Indonesia after netizens discovered his facial appearance in the music video of "Mou Koi Nante Shinai" looked similar to that of former president of Indonesia, Joko Widodo's. Many Indonesians also stated that the music video for the song appeared on their YouTube homepage, and other social media platforms are also filled with memes likening Makihara to Jokowi.

== Discography ==
=== Singles ===
Title	Year	Peak	Certifications	Album
Title	Year	JPN	Certifications	Album
"NG"	1990	—		Kimi ga Warau Toki Kimi no Mune ga Itamanai Yō ni
"Answer"	1991	—		Kimi ga Warau Toki Kimi no Mune ga Itamanai Yō ni
"Donna Toki Mo."	1991	1	RIAJ (old): 4× Platinum; RIAJ (Single Track): Platinum; RIAJ (streaming): Platinum	Kimi wa Dare to Shiawasena Akubi o Shimasu ka.
"Fuyu ga Hajimaru yo"	1991	5	RIAJ (old): 2× Platinum	Kimi wa Boku no Takaramono
"Mō Koi Nante Shinai"	1992	2	RIAJ (old): 3× Platinum; RIAJ (Chaku-uta Full): Gold; RIAJ (streaming): Platinum	Kimi wa Boku no Takaramono
"Kitakaze (Kimi ni Todokimasu Yō ni)"	1992	6	RIAJ (old): Platinum	Smiling: The Best of Noriyuki Makihara
"Kanojo no Koibito"	1993	4	RIAJ (old): Platinum	Self Portrait
"No. 1"	1993	1	RIAJ (old): Platinum	Self Portrait
"Zuru Yasumi"	1993	3	RIAJ (old): Gold	Self Portrait
"Yuki ni Negai o"	1993	12	RIAJ (old): Gold	Self Portrait
"Futatsu no Negai"	1994	3	RIAJ (old): Gold	Pharmacy
"Spy"	1994	1	RIAJ (old): Platinum	Pharmacy
"Secret Heaven"	1996	6		Ver.1.0E Love Letter From the Digital Cowboy
"Cowboy"	1996	20		Ver.1.0E Love Letter From the Digital Cowboy
"Dōshiyō mo Nai Boku ni Tenshi ga Oritekita"	1996	4	RIAJ (old): Gold	Underwear
"Mada Ikiteru yo"	1996	10	RIAJ (old): Gold	Non-album single
"Sunao"	1997	12	RIAJ (old): Gold	Such a Lovely Place
"Montage"	1997	9	RIAJ (old): Gold	Such a Lovely Place
"Ashioto"	1998	24		Such a Lovely Place
"Happy Dance"	1998	14		Cicada
"Stripe!"	1998	16		Cicada
"Hungry Spider"	1999	5	RIAJ (old): Gold	Cicada
"Momo"	2001	11		Home Sweet Home
"Are You OK?"	2001	16		Home Sweet Home
"Ame ni mo Makezu"	2002	25		Honjitsu wa Seiten Nari
"Hanabi no Yoru	2002	23		Honjitsu wa Seiten Nari
"Kore wa Tada no Tatoebanashi Janai"	2002	18		Honjitsu wa Seiten Nari
"Wow"	2003	57		Honjitsu wa Seiten Nari
"Kimi no Namae o Yonda Ato ni"	2003	11		Explorer
"Good Morning!"	2003	20		Non-album single
"Yasashii Uta ga Utaenai"	2004	12		Explorer
"Boku ga Ichiban Hoshikatta Mono"	2004	9	RIAJ: Gold; RIAJ (Chaku-uta Full): Gold; RIAJ (PC Download): Gold; RIAJ (streaming): Platinum	Explorer
"Chicken Rice" (with Masatoshi Hamada)	2004	2	RIAJ: Platinum	Non-album single
"Akenai Yoru ga Kuru Koto wa Nai"	2005	12		Life in Downtown
"Kokoro no Compass"	2005	17		Life in Downtown
"Honno Sukoshi Dake" (featuring Kuro of Home Made Kazoku)	2006	19		Life in Downtown
"Green Days"	2007	3	RIAJ (Chaku-uta Full): Gold; RIAJ (Single Track): Platinum	Kanashimi Nante Nan no Yaku ni mo Tatanai to Omotteita.
"Akai Muffler/Ogenki de!"	2007	33		Kanashimi Nante Nan no Yaku ni mo Tatanai to Omotteita.
"Firefly (Boku wa Ikiteiku)"	2008	17		Personal Soundtracks
"We Love You."	2008	22		Personal Soundtracks
"Mugen no Kanata e (To Infinity and Beyond)"	2009	27		Fuan no Naka ni Te o Tsukkonde
"Ringo no Hana"	2011	—		Heart to Heart
"Koisuru Kokoro-tachi no Tame ni"	2012	32		Dawn Over the Clover Field
"Yotsuba no Clover"	2012	26		Dawn Over the Clover Field
"Life Goes On (Like Nonstop Music)	2014	31		Lovable People
"Fall"	2014	33		Lovable People
"Koero."	2015	27		Believer
"Riyū"	2016	48		Believer
"Kioku"	2018	22		Design & Reason

=== Albums ===
- 'Kimi ga Warau Toki, Kimi no Mune ga Itamanai Youni' (25 October 1990, WEA Japan. Re-released 26 November 1998)
- 'kimi wa dareto shiawasana akubi wo shimasuka。' (25 June 1991)
- 'Kimi wa Dare to Shiawase na Akubi wo Shimasu ka.' (25 September 1991, WEA Japan. Re-released 26 November 1998)
- 'Kimi wa Boku no Takaramono' (25 June 1992, WEA Japan.Re-released 26 November 1998)
- 'SELF PORTRAIT' (31 October 1993, WEA Japan)
- 'PHARMACY' (25 October 1994, WEA Japan)
- 'Ver.1.0E LOVE LETTER FROM THE DIGITAL COWBOY' (25 July 1996, WEA Japan/River Way)
- 'LOVE CALLS FROM THE DIGITAL COWGIRL' (10 August 1996, WEA Japan/River Way)
- 'UNDERWEAR' (25 October 1996, WEA Japan/River Way)
- 'SMILING~THE BEST OF NORIYUKI MAKIHARA~' (10 May 1997, WEA Japan)
- 'SMILING II~THE BEST OF NORIYUKI MAKIHARA~' (25 September 1997, WEA Japan)
- 'Such a Lovely Place' (27 November 1997, SME Records)
- 'SMILING III~THE BEST OF NORIYUKI MAKIHARA~' (10 May 1998, WEA Japan)
- 'Listen to the Music' (28 October 1998, SME Records)
- 'SMILING GOLD~THE BEST & BACKING TRACKS~' (24 February 1999, WEA Japan)
- 'Cicada' (10 July 1999, SME Records)
- '10 Y. O. ~THE ANNIVERSARY COLLECTION~' (24 May 2000)
- 'Taiyou' (29 November 2000, WEA Japan)
- 'NORIYUKI MAKIHARA SINGLE COLLECTION~Such a Lovely Place 1997–1999~' (6 December 2000)
- 'Home Sweet Home' (21 November 2001, WEA Japan)
- 'Song Book~Since 1997–2001~' (23 January 2002)
- 'THE CONCERT – CONCERT TOUR 2002 "Home Sweet Home" – ' (9 May 2002)
- 'Honjitsu wa Seiten Nari' (7 November 2002, WEA Japan)
- 'EXPLORER' (11 August 2004, Toshiba-EMI)
- 'Completely Recorded' (25 August 2004, WEA Japan)
- 'NORIYUKI MAKIHARA SYMPHONY ORCHESTRA "CELEBRATION"' (25 November 2004)
- 'Listen To The Music 2' (28 September 2005, Toshiba-EMI)
- 'LIFE IN DOWNTOWN' (22 February 2006, Toshiba-EMI)
- 'Kanashimi Nante Nan no Yaku ni mo Tatanai to Omotteita.' (7 November 2007, J-More)
- 'Personal Soundtracks' (19 November 2008, J-More)
- 'Best LOVE' (1 January 2010, J-More)
- 'Best LIFE' (1 January 2010, J-More)
- 'Fuan no Naka ni Te o Tsukkonde' (30 June 2010, J-More)
- 'Heart to Heart' (27 July 2011, Buppu/SME Records)
- 'Dawn Over the Clover Field' (19 December 2012, Buppu/SME Records)
- 'Listen To The Music 3' (22 January 2014, Buppu/SME Records)
- 'Lovable People' (11 February 2015, Buppu/SME Records)
- 'Believer' (14 December 2016, Buppu/SME Records)
- 'Design & Reason' (13 February 2019, Buppu/SME Records)
- 'Yosoro' (25 October 2021, Buppu/SME Records)
- 'Bespoke' (2 March 2022, Buppu/SME Records)

== See also ==
- List of best-selling music artists in Japan
