= 10-Feet =

Japanese rock band

- Origin: Kyoto, Japan
- Genres: Indie rock; alternative rock; pop punk; melodic hardcore
- Years active: 1997–present
- Label: Universal Music Japan
- Members: Takuma Mitamura; Naoki Inoue; Kouichi Nakaoka
- Website: 10-feet.kyoto

10-Feet (テンフィート) is a Japanese rock band formed in 1997 in Kyoto, signed to Universal Music Japan and managed by Badass. Their music styles are mix of rock, punk, heavy metal, reggae, hip-hop, guitar pop and bossa nova.

== Band members ==
- Takuma Mitamura (三田村 卓真) – lead vocals and lead and rhythm electric guitar
- Naoki Inoue (井上 直樹) – electric bass guitar and backing vocals
- Kouichi Nakaoka (中岡 浩一) – drum kit and backing vocals

== Discography ==
=== Studio albums ===
Year	Album details	Oricon charts
2002	Springman: 1st studio album; Released: April 12, 2002	—
2004	Realife: 2nd studio album; Released: January 28, 2004	—
2005	4Rest: 3rd studio album; Released: May 25, 2005	—
2006	6-feat: Released: April 19, 2006	20
2006	Twister: 4th studio album; Released: August 16, 2006	10
2008	Vandalize: 5th studio album; Released: February 27, 2008	11
2009	Life Is Sweet: 6th studio album; Released: September 9, 2009	8
2012	Thread: 7th studio album; Released: September 19, 2012	7
2014	6-Feat 2: Released: June 18, 2014	11
2014	Re: 6-Feat: Released: June 18, 2014	10
2017	Fin: 8th studio album; Released: November 1, 2017	2
2022	Collins (コリンズ): Released: December 14, 2022	2

=== Best albums ===
Year	Album details	Oricon charts
2007	Re: Springman+ 〜Indies Complete Disc: Released: July 25, 2007	37
2010	10-Best 2001–2009: Released: December 8, 2010	19

=== Singles ===
Year	Title	Oricon charts
2001	"April Fool": Released: April 1, 2001	—
2001	"May I Help You?": Released: May 1, 2001	—
2002	"River": Released: October 23, 2002	—
2003	"Nil?": Released: June 11, 2003	—
2004	"Hey!": Released: June 23, 2004	—
2004	"Buzzing": Released: October 27, 2004	—
2006	"Lion": Released: February 8, 2006	22
2006	"Overcome": Released: June 14, 2006	24
2007	"Stone Cold Break": Released: April 25, 2007	25
2007	"Goes On": Released: November 14, 2007	21
2009	"1sec.": Released: March 25, 2009	10
2009	"Super Stomper": Released: July 15, 2009	9
2010	"Hammer Ska": Released: September 8, 2010	9
2011	"Sono Mukou e": Released: November 2, 2011	8
2016	"Antena Rasuto": Released: July 20, 2016	5
2017	"Hitorisekai x Hitorhythm": Released: February 1, 2017	4
2017	"Taiyo no Tsuki": Released: July 19, 2017	—
2019	"Hello Fixer": Released: July 24, 2019	6
2023	"Re Houteishiki": Released: October 20, 2023	—
2024	"Helm'n Bass": Released: July 3, 2024	5

=== Covers and tributes ===
Year	Song	Original artists	Performed by	Released on	Notes
2008	"Sad but True"	Metallica	10-Feet	Metal-Ikka album	Released: October 22, 2008.
2012	"Breed"	Nirvana	10-Feet	Nevermind Tribute album	A tribute album by Japanese music artists (released on April 4, 2012) to celebrates 20th anniversary of Nirvana's masterpiece album Nevermind.
2013	"Koyoi no Tsuki no Yoni" (今宵の月のように Like the moon tonight)	Elephant Kashimashi	10-Feet	Elephant Kashimashi Cover Album 2 ~A Tribute to The Elephant Kashimashi~	Released: December 18, 2013
2014	"Little Wing"	Lindberg	10-Feet	Lindberg Tribute ~ min'na no rindobāgu ~ (Lindberg Tribute ～みんなのリンドバーグ～ Lindberg Tribute ~Everyone's Lindbergh~)	Released: July 23, 2014
2015	"Namidagakirari" (涙がキラリ Tears are grueling)	Spitz	10-Feet	JUST LIKE HONEY ～『ハチミツ』20th Anniversary Tribute～ (Just Like Honey ~ "Honey" 20th Anniversary Tribute)	Released: December 23, 2015
2016	"Train-train"	The Blue Hearts	10-Feet	30th anniversary The Blue Hearts Re-mix『Re-spect』	Released: January 27, 2016
2024	"Te to Te" (手と手 Hand to hand)	CreepHyp	10-Feet	CreepHyp Tribute Album 「もしも生まれ変わったならそっとこんな声になって」 (CreepHyp Tribute Album "If I were to be reborn, I would like my voice to be like this")	Released: August 28, 2024

=== Collaborations ===
Year	Song	Album	Artist
2003	"I Saw Mommy Kissing Santa Claus Last Night" (feat. Takuma)	Punk Rock Xmas	Nicotine
2005	"Legend ~Are yu ready" (feat. 10-Feet)	Samātaimu!! (Summer Time!!)	Minmi
2013	"Database" (feat. Takuma (10-Feet))	Tales of Purefly	Man with a Mission
2013	"Senkou" (feat. 10-Feet)	Ska Me Forever	Tokyo Ska Paradise Orchestra
2013	"Da Na Na" (feat. Takuma (10-Feet))	The Best Fat Collection	Totalfat
