= Moomin (singer) =

- Born: July 13, 1972 (age 54)
- Origin: Chigasaki, Kanagawa Prefecture, Japan
- Genre: Reggae
- Years active: 1992 - present
- Labels: Kioon; Island; Knife Edge
- Website: Official site (Knife Edge); Official site (UMG); Official site (Overheat Studio)

Moomin (むーみん) (born July 13, 1972) and styled as MOOMIN is a Japanese reggae artist. Along with a number of colleagues, he is responsible for the growth and popularity of Japan's reggae scene.

He is originally from Chigasaki, Kanagawa, and is married with two children. He works at Overheat Studios, and keeps his real name secret.

Moomin first appeared on the reggae scene in 1992, and traveled to Jamaica the following year. His official debut with a record label was in 1997 (under Kioon Records), and since 2003 he has been with Universal Music Group.

== Discography ==
=== Singles ===
- Happy and Free (July 21, 1997)
- In the Rain (January 21, 1998)
- Feel Alright! (May 30, 1998)
- Kakegae no nai Mono (かけがえのないもの, Something with no Backup Copy) (January 21, 1999)
- Ride On (June 9, 1999)
- Big City (October 21, 1999)
- My Sweetest (November 20, 1999)
- Kimi wo Omou Yoru (キミを想う夜, The Night I Think of You) (November 15, 2000)
- Kanashimi ga Kieru made (悲しみが消えるまで, Until the Sadness is Extinguished) (February 28, 2001)
- @ the Dancehall featuring Corn Head (May 9, 2001)
- Summer Riddim 01 (August 8, 2001) (Moomin & Dōzan Miki)
- Straight Ahead (December 5, 2001)
- Kindan no Mori (禁断の森, Forbidden Forest) featuring Corn Head & Rude Boy Face (May 22, 2002)
- Natsu no Owari no Harmony (夏の終わりのハーモニー, Harmony of Summer's End) (July 24, 2002) Cover of Yōsui Inoue & Kōji Tamaki
- Itsumo Soba de (いつもそばで, Always There) (May 21, 2003)
- Saibai shitai ~ Sekai chū de~ (栽培したい～世界中で～, I Want to Help Things Grow Throughout the World) (August 6, 2003)
- Nebagiba (ネバギバ) (April 28, 2004)
- Joy of Life (March 30, 2005)
- Natsu Kirakira (夏キラキラ, Shining Summer) (May 25, 2005)
- Riverside Hotel (リバーサイド ホテル) (May 10, 2006) Cover of Yōsui Inoue

=== Albums ===
- In My Life (July 1, 1998)
- Moments (July 28, 1999)
- Triple M (November 15, 2000) Remix Album
- Get Here (May 23, 2001)
- Natural High (July 24, 2002)
- Rise Again (June 25, 2003)
- The Best of Moomin (July 2, 2003)
- Rise Again Remixes (September 17, 2003)
- No More Trouble (June 23, 2004)
- Featuring Works (November 24, 2004)
- Link Up (June 22, 2005)
- Adapt (May 24, 2006) Cover Album

=== DVD ===
- Moomin Live Tour 2004 "No More Trouble" (November 24, 2004)

=== Other ===
- Shōnan no Kaze (湘南乃風)「Ōen Uta (応援歌) feat. Moomin」
- Dōzan Miki (三木道三)「Gekkō (月光) feat. Moomin」

== Radio ==
- Mother Music Records (JFN系) - PUSHIMと木曜23時より放送(2005年9月で終了)

== See also ==
- PUSHIM - 事務所が同じ
- Dozan Miki - タワーレコードもポスターのみでなく、歌でも共演。
- Yōsui Inoue, Kōji Tamaki - 「夏の終わりのハーモニー」をカヴァー
- Kreva (Kick the Can Crew)
- Yamaarashi
