= Saito (disambiguation) =

Saitō is a Japanese surname. Saito may also refer to:

== Places and transportation ==
- Saito, Miyazaki (西都 (lit. "west capital")), a city in Miyazaki Prefecture, Japan
- 2615 Saito, a main-belt asteroid discovered on September 4, 1951
- Saitō Garden (Ishinomaki), a garden in Ishinomaki, Miyagi Prefecture, Japan
- Sushi Saito, a sushi restaurant in Tokyo
- Osaka Monorail Saito Line, a line on the monorail in Osaka, Japan
- Saito-nishi Station, a station on the Osaka Monorail

== Other uses ==
- Saito, a Japanese clan from Echizen province
- Saito (Ghost in the Shell), a character in the anime series Ghost in the Shell
- Saito Hikari (光 彩斗), a character in the video game series Mega Man Battle Network
- Saito Hiraga (平賀 才人), a character in the light novel series The Familiar of Zero
- Saito Nagasaki (born 1981), Singaporean musician, DJ and promoter

== See also ==
- Itakura–Saito distance, a measure of the perceptual difference between an original spectrum and an approximation of that spectrum
- Saito Kinen Festival Matsumoto, an annual classical music festival held in the Japanese Alps near Matsumoto
- Saito suplex, an offensive move named for Masa Saito used in professional sport wrestling
