= Suita City Football Stadium =

Stadium in Japan

Suita City Football Stadium Panasonic Stadium Suita
- パナソニックスタジアム吹田
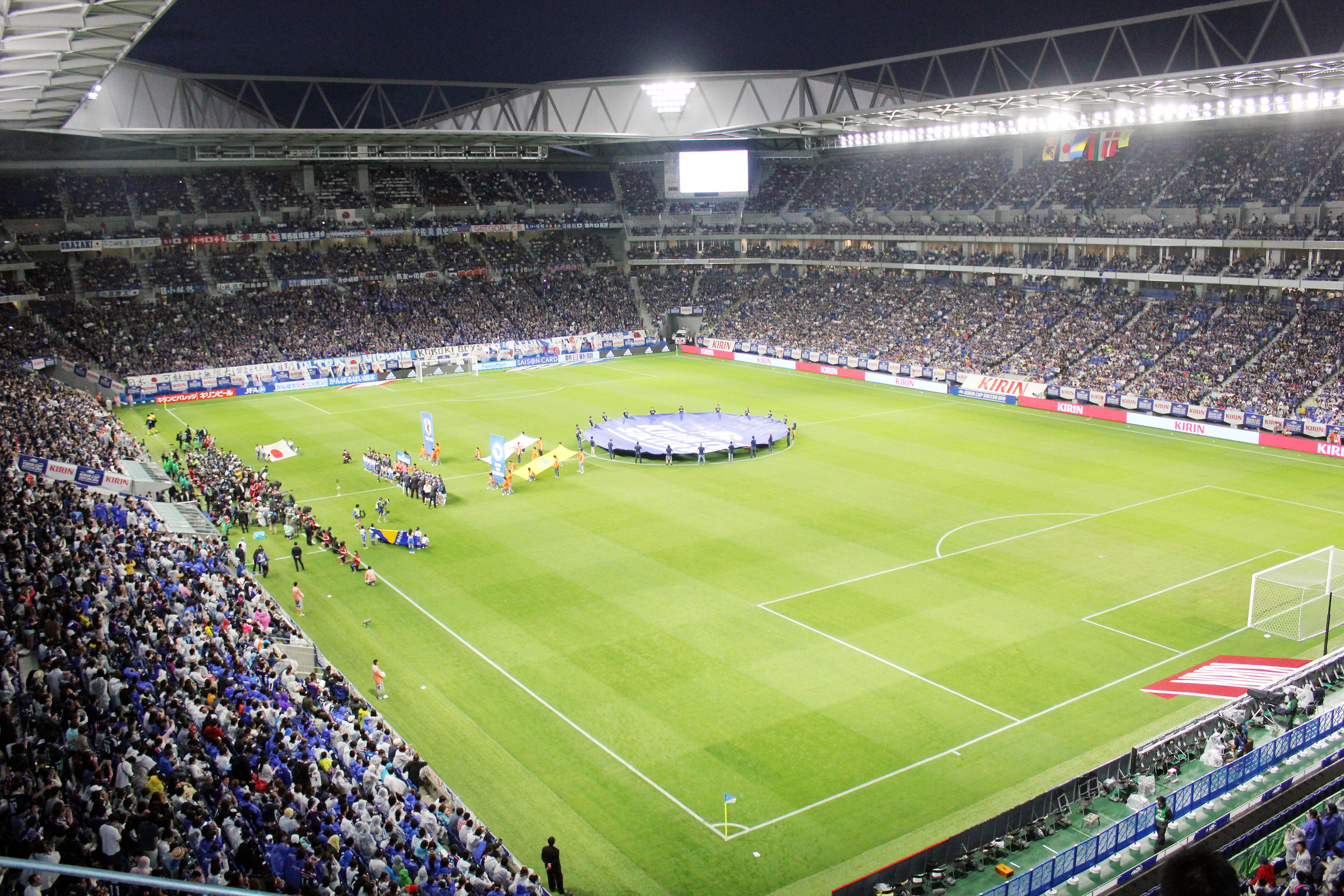
- Interactive map of Suita City Football Stadium; Panasonic Stadium Suita
- Location: Suita, Osaka, Japan
- Coordinates: 34°48′09″N 135°32′18″E
- Owner: City of Suita, Osaka Prefecture
- Operator: Gamba Osaka
- Capacity: 39,694
- Surface: Grass
- Public transit: Osaka Monorail: Saito Line at Kōen-higashiguchi

Construction
- Groundbreaking: December 13, 2013; 12 years ago
- Built: December 2013 – September 22, 2015
- Opened: October 10, 2015; 11 years ago
- Cost: ¥14.086 billion
- Architects: Takenaka; Yasui Architects

Tenants
- Gamba Osaka (2016–present); Japan national football team

Suita City Football Stadium (市立吹田サッカースタジアム, Shiritsu Suita Sakkā Sutajiamu), a.k.a. Panasonic Stadium Suita (パナソニックスタジアム吹田, Panasonikku Sutajiamu Suita) for sponsorship reasons. is a stadium located in the city of Suita, Osaka Prefecture, Japan. It has a capacity of 39,694.

The stadium is home of the J1 League football club Gamba Osaka since 2016 and replaced Expo '70 Commemorative Stadium, which had been their main stadium between 1991 and 2015.

Panasonic, whose headquarters are located in the nearby city of Kadoma, acquired the naming rights since January 1, 2018.

== International match ==
Date	Competition	Team 1	Result	Team 2	Attendance
7 Jun 2016	International Friendly	Japan	1–2	Bosnia and Herzegovina	35,589
11 Sep 2018	International Friendly	Japan	3–0	Costa Rica	33,891
19 Nov 2019	International Friendly	Japan	1–4	Venezuela	33,399
7 Jun 2021	FIFA World Cup qualifier	Japan	4–1	Tajikistan	0
15 Jun 2021	FIFA World Cup qualifier	Japan	5–1	Kyrgyzstan	0
2 Sep 2021	FIFA World Cup qualifier	Japan	0–1	Oman	4,853
16 Nov 2023	FIFA World Cup qualifier	Japan	5–0	Myanmar	34,484
10 Jun 2025	FIFA World Cup qualifier	Japan	6–0	Indonesia	33,661
10 Oct 2025	International Friendly	Japan	2–2	Paraguay	34,169
30 Dec 2026	International Friendly	Japan	–	Vietnam	

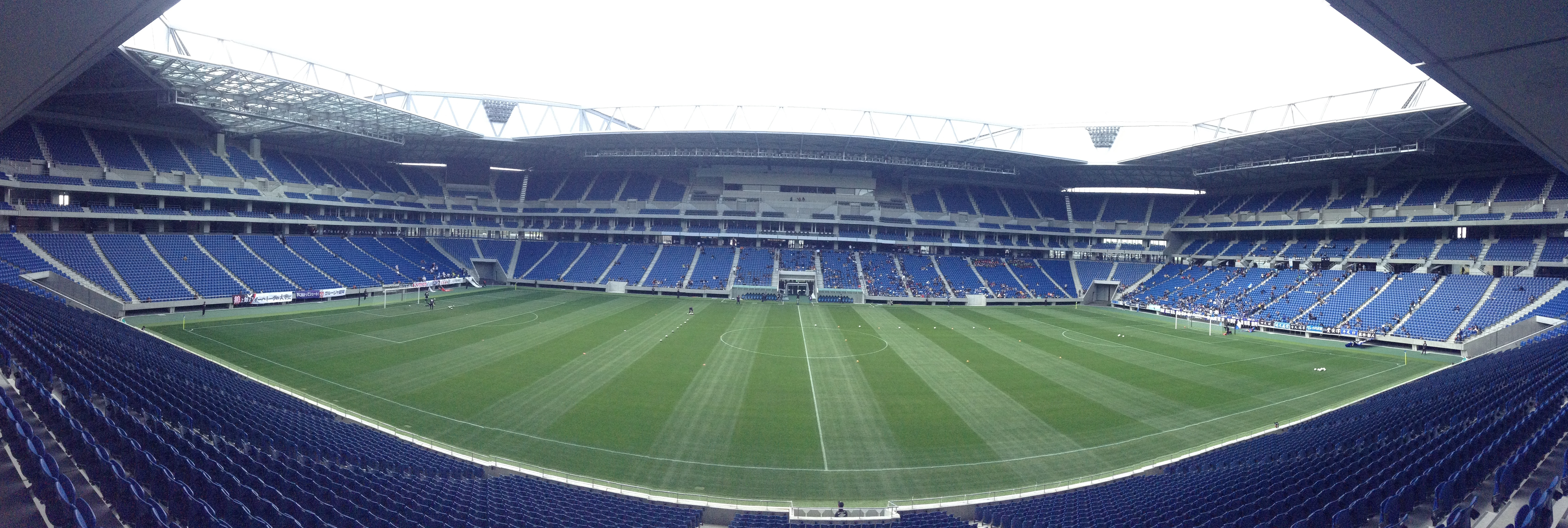
Panoramic view of Suita Stadium (March 2016)

Events and tenants
Preceded by Ajinomoto Stadium	Emperor's Cup; Final Venue; 2016	Succeeded by Saitama Stadium 2002
