= Japanese-style diet =

Japanese-style diet (日本型食生活) is a dietary lifestyle influenced by traditional Japanese eating habits that center around rice as the staple food, along with vegetables, soybeans, fish, and seaweed. It avoids excessive consumption of animal fats, salt, and sugar. This concept was first proposed by the Ministry of Agriculture, Forestry, and Fisheries in 1980 and advocated in 1983. Opinions suggesting that overly refined rice is undesirable were ultimately not included in the final proposal. Similar guidelines were established in the Dietary Guidelines of 1985, which have been revised about every 15 years.

After the end of World War II in 1945, Japan, amidst severe food shortages, received food aid from the United States and promoted a Western-style diet using such food supplies. However, when health problems caused by the diet became apparent in the US itself and the "US Dietary Goals" were established in 1977, Japan began exploring the concept of a Japanese-style diet.

== History ==
The "Japanese-style diet" is based on the dietary habits of Japanese people in the 1970s, centered around rice, with main dishes, side dishes, and a variety of foods such as fish, vegetables, and fruits. The basic structure consists of a soup and three dishes, namely a main dish and two side dishes. By centering on rice, a balanced meal can be assembled with a variety of combinations such as Japanese-style, Western-style, and Chinese-style side dishes, promoting nutritional variety. This diet of rice, fish, and vegetables is internationally recognized as a major reason why Japanese people have one of the world's longest life spans. It is considered a healthy and longevity-promoting diet. It is also considered desirable in terms of food self-sufficiency and food safety.

In the post-World War II food shortages, a large quantity of flour was imported with American economic aid. As part of the occupation policy, school lunches mainly consisted of bread and skimmed milk powder, promoting a bread-eating culture among children. General Douglas MacArthur, the Supreme Commander of the Allied Forces, boasted, "We have come to transform the poor Japanese diet of rice, fish, and vegetables into a rich diet of bread, meat, and milk."

Furthermore, when flour became freely sold in 1952, the Nutrition Improvement Law was enacted, aiming to promote Westernization of the diet. This was in line with the statement of Crawford F. Sams, the Director of the Public Health and Welfare Bureau of the GHQ, who said "the Pacific War was a confrontation between a bread-eating people and a rice-eating people, and the conclusion was that the bread-eating people were superior." The Ministry of Health and Welfare, based on the Nutrition Improvement Law, conducted a National Nutrition Survey and started a nutrition improvement movement. As a result, nutrition education at the time was based on Western nutrition science, with a noticeable trend towards following the West, including a focus on bread. Rice, the traditional staple food of the Japanese, was sidelined and the market was saturated. In 1970, rice reduction and purchase restrictions began. The annual per capita consumption of rice, which peaked at 118.3 kilograms in 1962, declined steadily, falling to half, around 60 kilograms, in the late 1990s.

== Achievement of nutritional improvement ==
The Japan Dietetic Association was established in 1955, receiving financial assistance from the United States and using a kitchen car (a nutritional guidance vehicle) to conduct demonstrations and instruction of Japanese, Western, and Chinese cuisine by dieticians. Various dishes were encouraged in the nutritional improvement movement, which increased the proportion of side dishes in the diet. After around 1965, while the consumption of wheat did not increase, only rice decreased. Naomichi Ishige, an honorary professor at the National Museum of Ethnology, pointed out that the decrease in rice consumption was not so much due to the increase in the consumption of wheat products as it was to the increase in the consumption of various dishes. Around this time, along with city gas, propane gas started to become popular, and stainless-steel sinks were released, greatly changing the way home cooking was done. The availability of fire at any time made grilling easier, and frying and stir-frying, which require high heat, also became easy to make. Traditional Japanese dishes such as boiled and mixed dishes decreased in proportion, and Western and Chinese dishes began to be served on the dining table. Western and Chinese dishes are indispensable for meat, and fish sausage is symbolic of its popularity. Of course, fish sausage is not meat but is made from fish and is treated as equivalent. It supported the spread of meat-eating in Japan, and gradually the consumption of actual meat increased. Instead of the traditional Japanese diet of rice, fish, and vegetables, a Western and Chinese-style diet using meat became popular.

Originally, the Japanese were known as a rice-eating people, and even in urban areas, people other than the upper class could not eat enough white rice, and in rural areas, even in rice fields, other grains and vegetables were mixed with rice to make mixed-rice as a staple food. In non-rice farming areas, only a small amount of rice was available, and a meal of various grains and tubers was eaten. In addition, the shortage of rice during and after the war was severe, and the majority of Japanese people could not eat rice regularly. This can be seen from the black market and the Rice Acquisition People's Assembly shouting for rice.

Later, in the early Showa 40s (1965–1974), rice self-sufficiency was finally achieved and became the staple food of the Japanese in both name and reality. The Japanese diet at that time, according to the French agronomist Joseph Clatman, had an ideal calorie ratio of protein, fat, and carbohydrates, and thanks to this balanced diet, the health of the Japanese improved significantly, and the average life expectancy became one of the highest in the world. Also, the US, which was struggling with the increase in medical expenses, recommended in the McGovern Report to reduce the consumption of animal foods such as meat, dairy products, and eggs, and to consume more unrefined grains, vegetables, and fruits, which was achieved by the Japanese diet at that time. However, as the Western and Chinese style of eating with many side dishes became popular in Japan, the consumption of rice decreased and the consumption of fat increased, and there were signs of an increase in lifestyle diseases such as metabolic syndrome.

== Desirable diet ==
Therefore, a policy change was made, and the Ministry of Agriculture, Forestry and Fisheries, which was suffering from a deficit in the Food Control Account due to the surplus of rice, reported in the "Basic Direction of Agriculture in the 1980s" of the Agricultural Policy Council in 1980 that there is a dietary pattern that could be called Japanese-style dietary life, which is different from Western countries, and it is considered to have a large influence on traditional eating habits. It was defined in the Agricultural Policy Council's 1982 report, "Promotion of the Basic Direction of Agriculture in the 1980s," as a "diverse and nutritionally balanced healthy and affluent dietary life." Furthermore, the Ministry of Agriculture, Forestry and Fisheries established a "Dietary Life Discussion Group" consisting of 26 experts in medicine and nutrition. Five Dietary Life Discussion Meetings were held. It was suggested that it is desirable to maintain a Japanese-style dietary life for security reasons, as the Westernization of dietary habits increases import dependence and the disorder of dietary habits leads to lifestyle diseases, which are heading towards overnutrition.
