= Expo Commemoration Park =

Park in Osaka Prefecture, Japan

Coordinates: 34°48′36.44″N 135°31′39.36″E

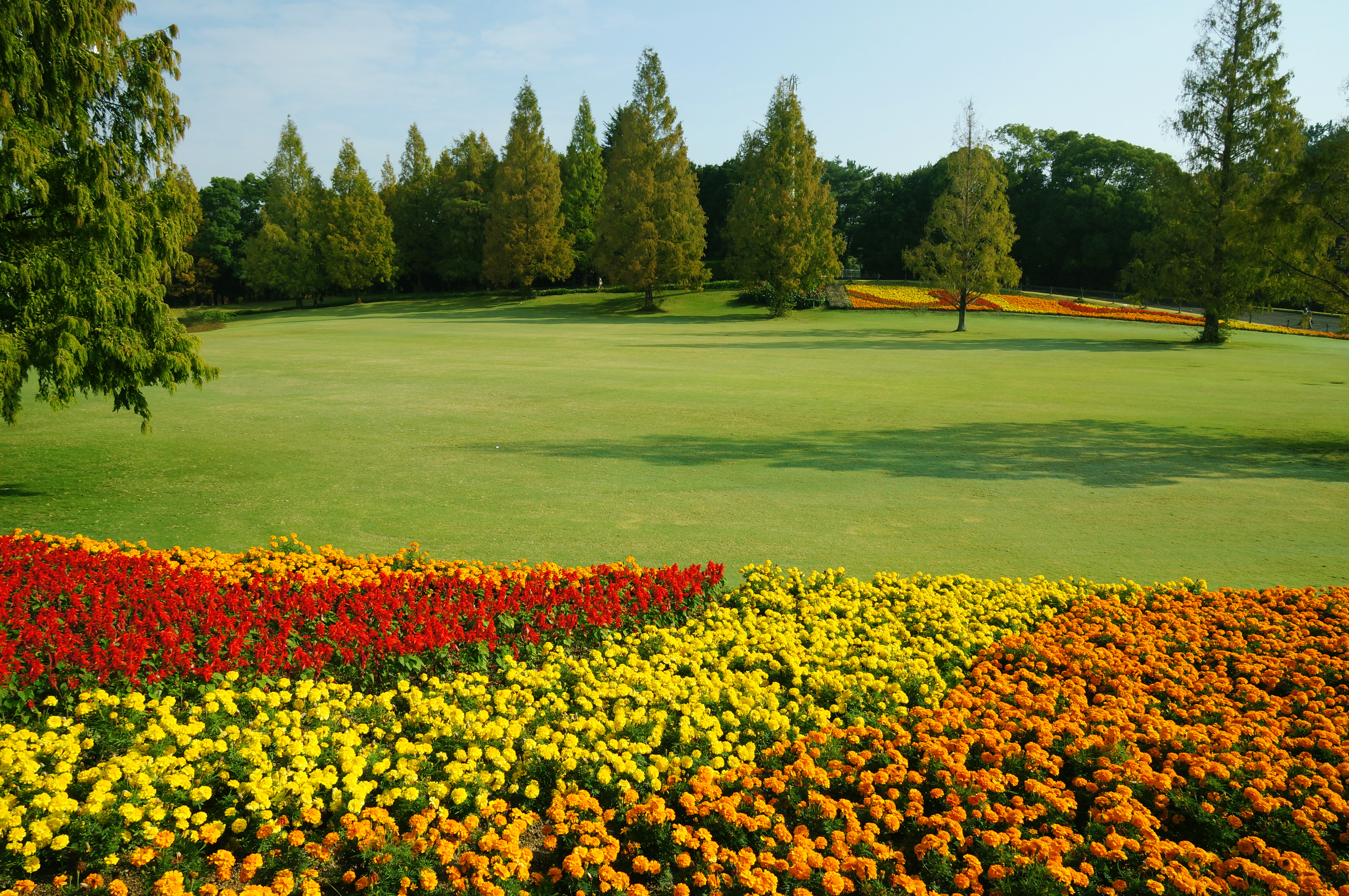
Garden of the Sun

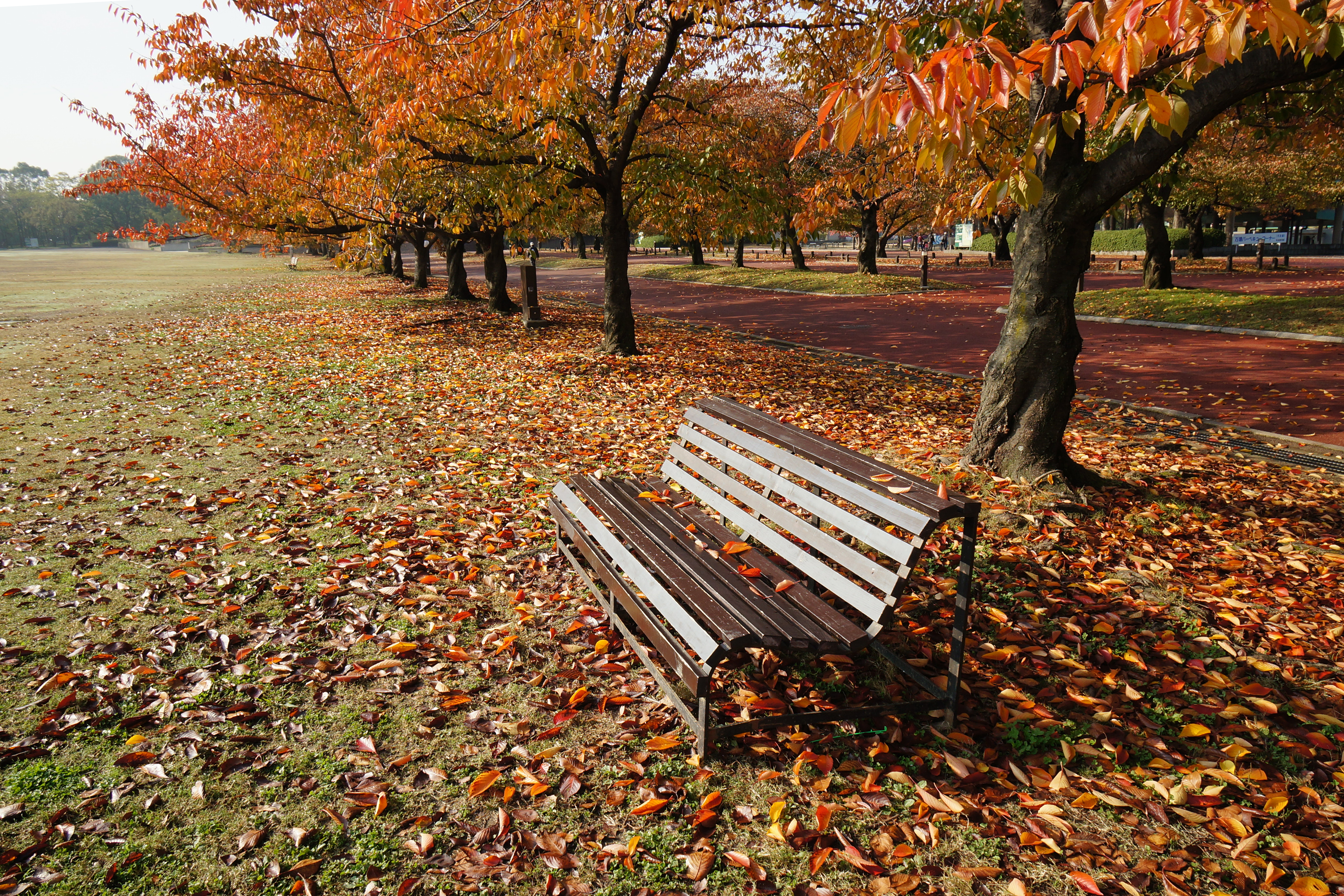
East garden

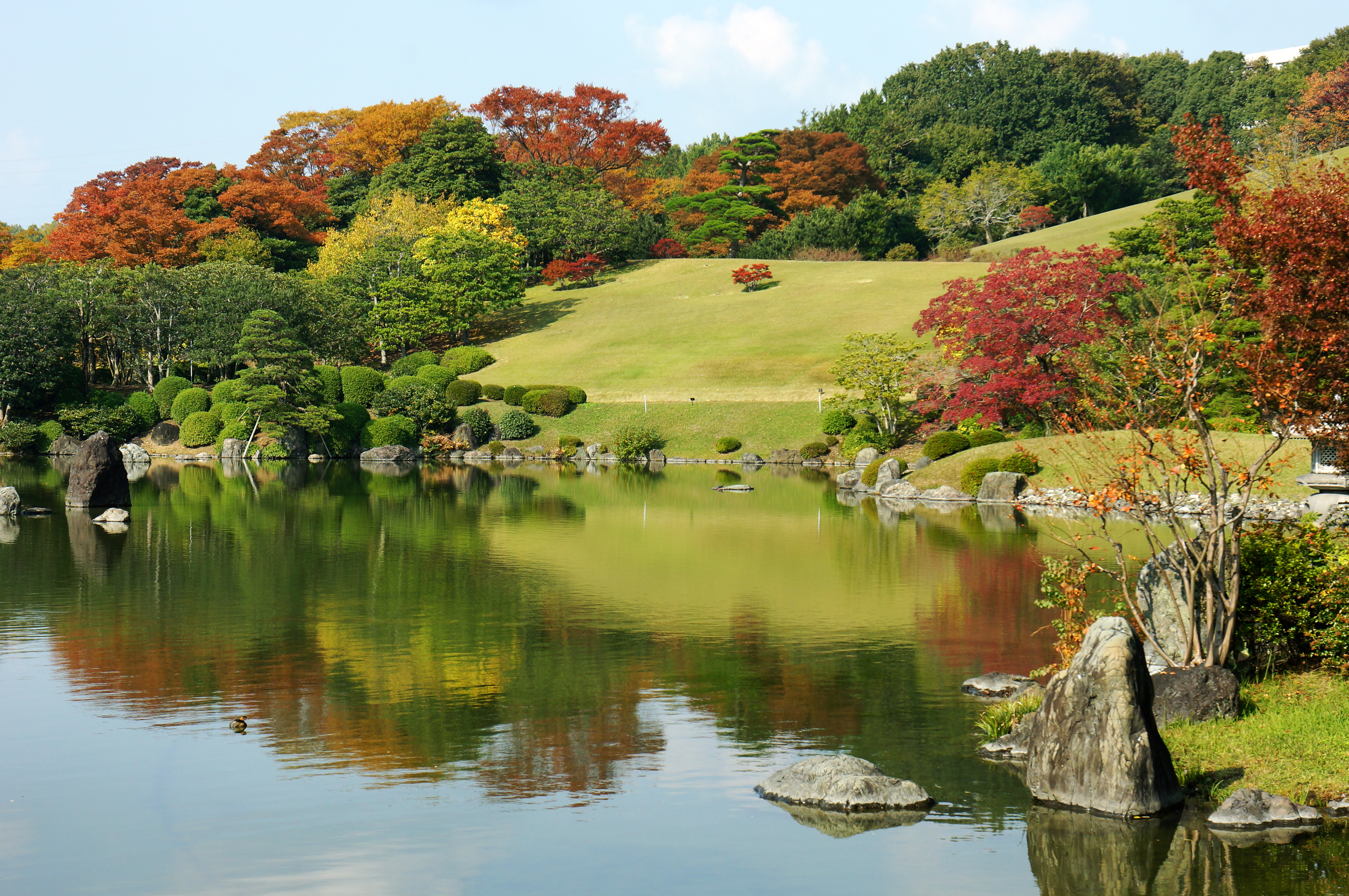
The Japanese Garden

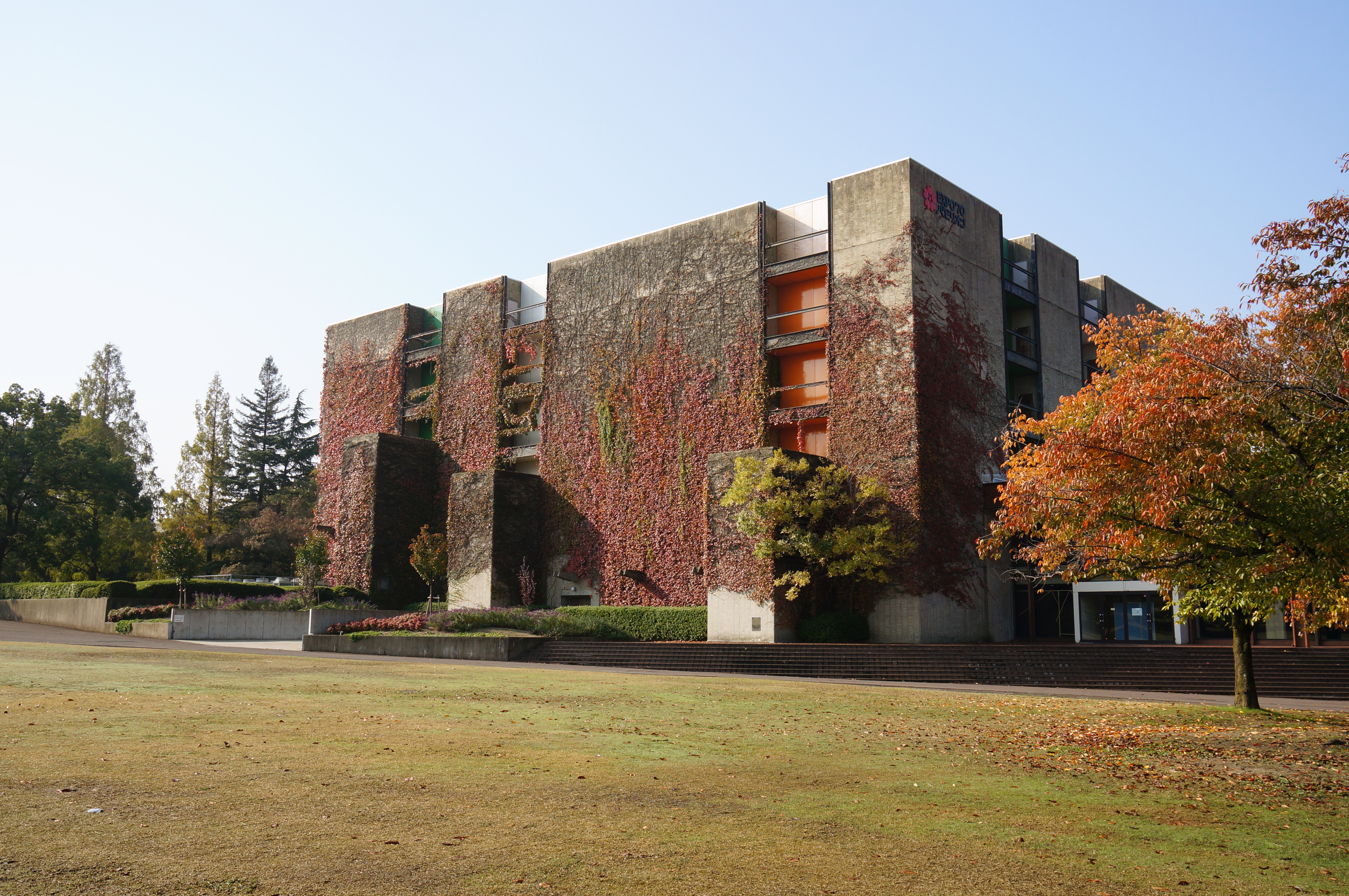
Pavilion of Expo '70

Expo Commemoration Park (万博記念公園, Bampaku kinen kōen) or Expo '70 Commemorative Park is a park in Suita, Japan, to the north of Osaka (about 15 km (9.3 mi) from Umeda). The park is the former site of Expo '70, a World's Fair held between March 15 and September 13, 1970. It is about 264 ha (650 acres) of lawn and forest, and has education and recreation facilities.

The National Museum of Ethnology, the Osaka Expo '70 Stadium, and part of the Expoland are in this park. The National Museum of Art used to be here but was moved to Nakanoshima area, Kita-ku, Osaka. The park has the Tower of the Sun, a symbolic landmark of the Expo '70, which has been preserved and repaired a number of times. Some of the materials used or built in the Expo '70 remain.

== Establishments ==
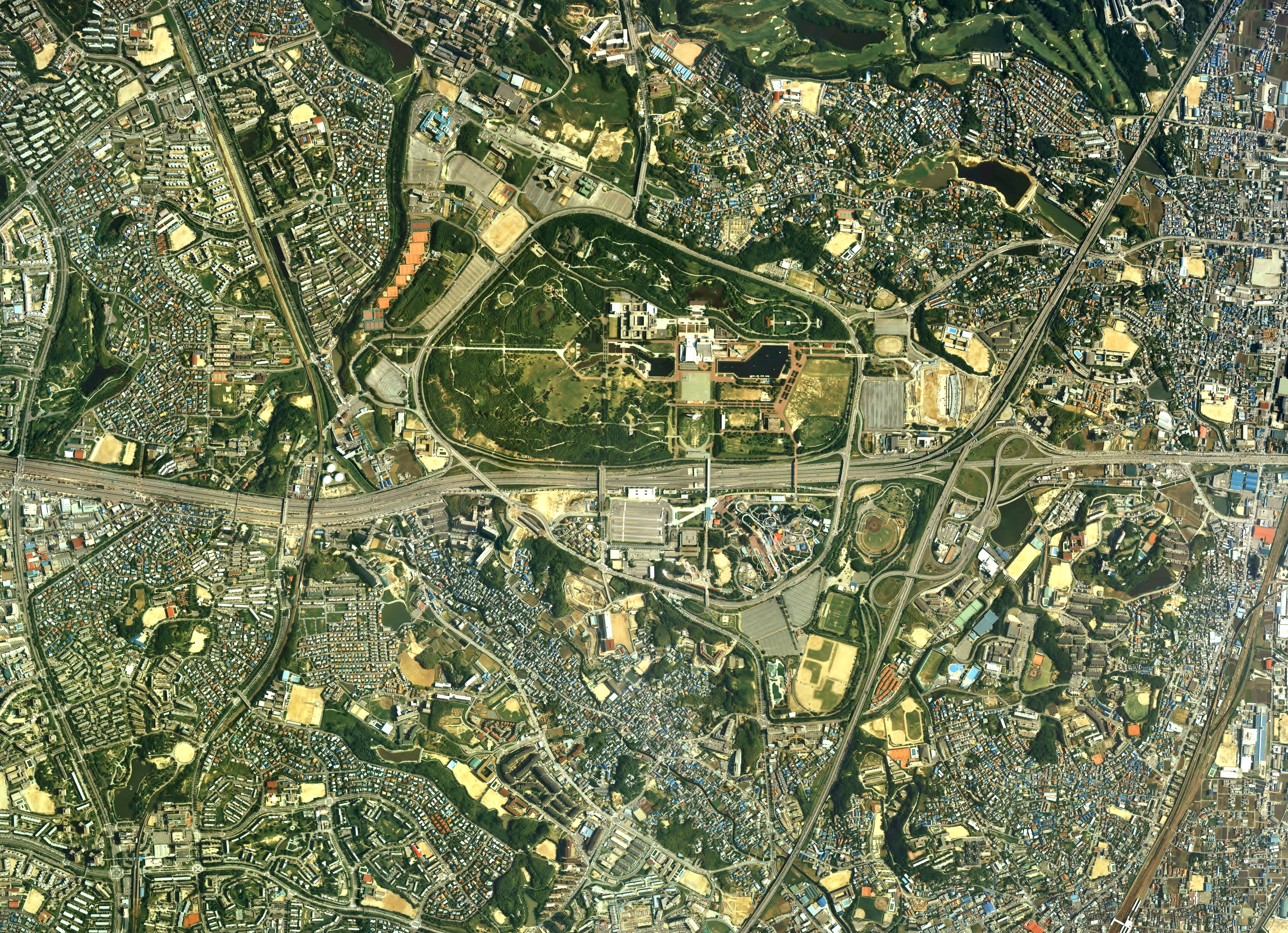
An aerial view of the park

- The Natural and Cultural Gardens: there were pavilions in this area. Now it is areas of very large lawn and trees of about 98 ha with over 470,000 trees.
- The Japanese Garden: about 26 ha.
- National Museum of Ethnology, Japan
- International Institute for Children's Literature Osaka
- Japan Folk Crafts Museum Osaka
- Osaka Expo '70 Stadium
- Expoland

== Train stations ==
- Banpaku-Kinen-Koen Station, Osaka Monorail Main Line
- Koen-higashiguchi Station, Osaka Monorail Saito Line
- Yamada Station, Hankyu Senri Line

== See also ==
- Japanese post-war economic miracle
- Hattori Ryokuchi Park
- The 100 Views of Nature in Kansai
