= Handai-byōin-mae Station =

Monorail station in Osaka, Japan

Handai-byōin-mae Station 阪大病院前駅
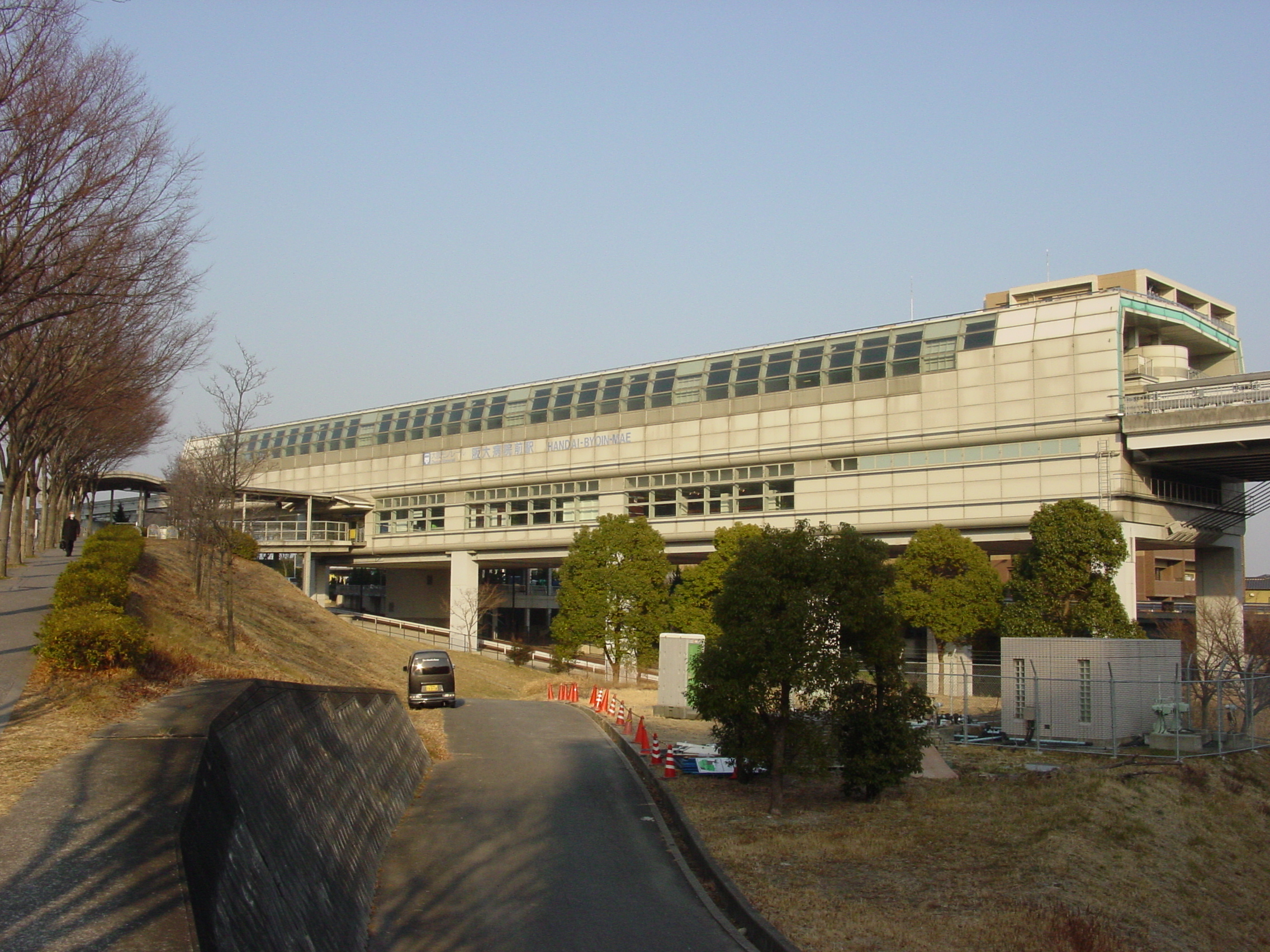
- Station building

General information
- Location: Ibaraki, Osaka; Japan
- Coordinates: 34°49′07.00″N 135°31′47.09″E
- Operator: Osaka Monorail
- Line: Saito Line
- Platforms: 1 island platform
- Tracks: 2

Construction
- Structure type: Elevated
- Accessible: Yes

Other information
- Station code: 52
- Website: Official website

History
- Opened: 1 October 1998
Location

Handai-byōin-mae Station (阪大病院前駅, Handai-byōin-mae-eki) is a monorail station on the Osaka Monorail located in Ibaraki, Osaka, Japan. It is located in front of The University of Osaka Hospital.

The name means the "station in front of Osaka University Hospital."

== Lines ==
- Osaka Monorail Saito Line (Station Number: 52)

== Layout ==
There is an island platform with two tracks.

1	■ Saito Line	to Saito-nishi
2	■ Saito Line	for Bampaku-kinen-kōen and Senri-Chūō

== Adjacent stations ==
«	Service	»
Osaka Monorail Saito Line (52)
Koen-higashiguchi (51)	-	Toyokawa (53)
