= Kulap =

Traditional funerary sculptures of New Ireland

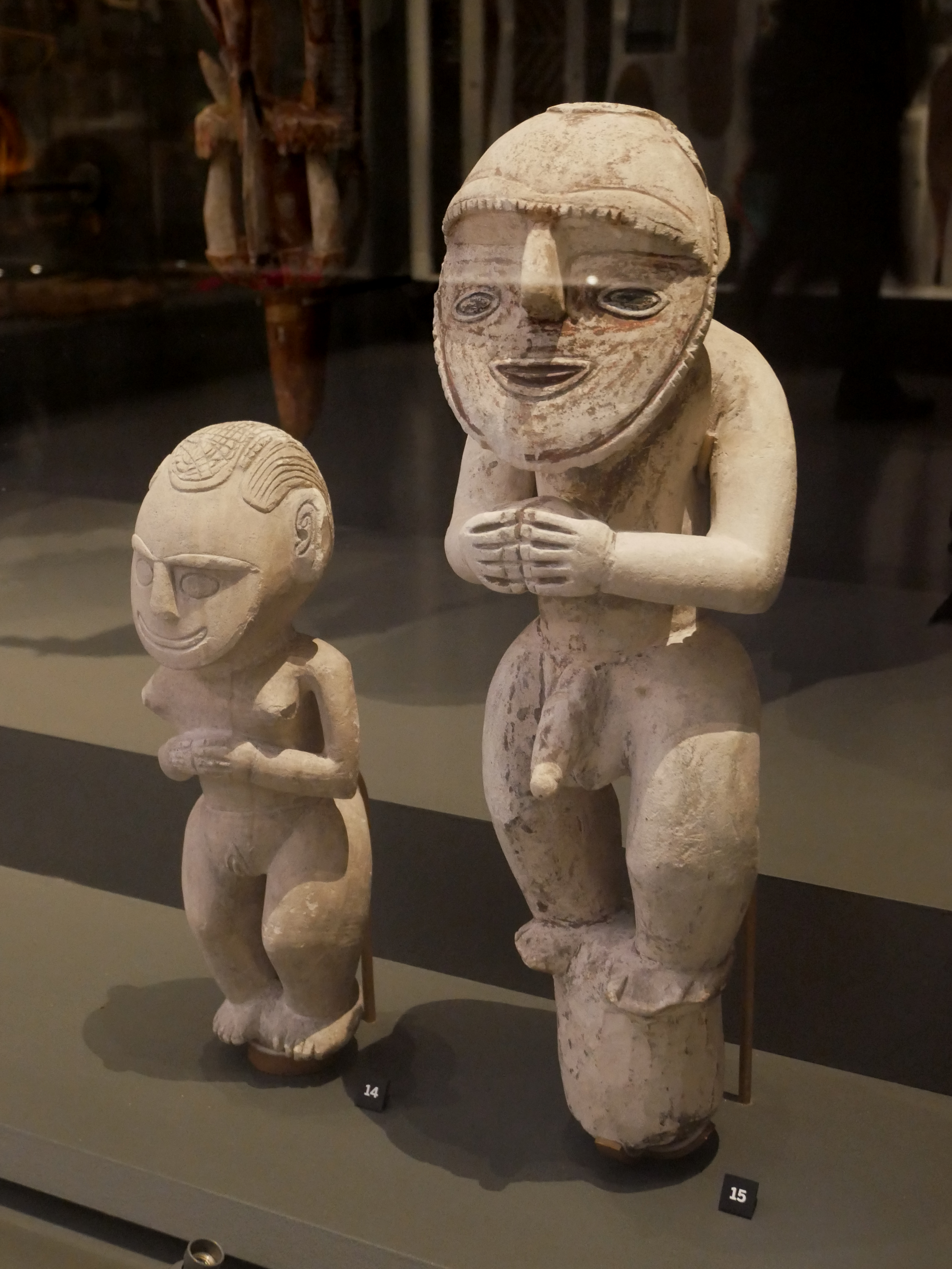
- Two kulap figurines in the Horniman Museum, London
- Material: Chalk or Limestone
- Discovered: Southern part of the New Ireland
- Present location: Found in many museums in Berlin, New York, Australia and Africa.

Kulap figurines of limestone or chalk were made in Melanesia. The small funerary sculptures from New Ireland were associated with death rituals. They are typical in the hilly Punam region of the New Ireland province in Papua New Guinea of the Bismarck Archipelago. They were believed to contain the soul of the deceased person whom they were meant to represent, and would be ritually smashed once their usefulness or the period of mourning was over. In more recent years, some have been sold in their intact forms to Westerners, particularly to German administrators.

== History ==
The figurines were found in an intact form in the nineteenth century. However, as Christianity took roots in these islands, the belief system for Kulap figures vanished. Particularly when the Australian administration of New Ireland was established in 1914, the ritual practice ceased to exist. However, during the colonial rule, the figurines were sold to Westerners for their cultural value. The earliest recorded history of these figures was provided by Reverend George Brown during his visit to an area on the west coast at Patpatar of southern New Ireland where the language spoken was Hinsal. Brown had noted that these figures were kept in a large, painted, corner house, which was well maintained on protected land. The building had kept two, large, painted human figures (one large male figure and the other smaller but not intended for worship) inferred to be linked to some kind of superstition as people danced in front of the figures. Women and children were prohibited entry. The last of the figurines was created ca. 1910.

== Features ==
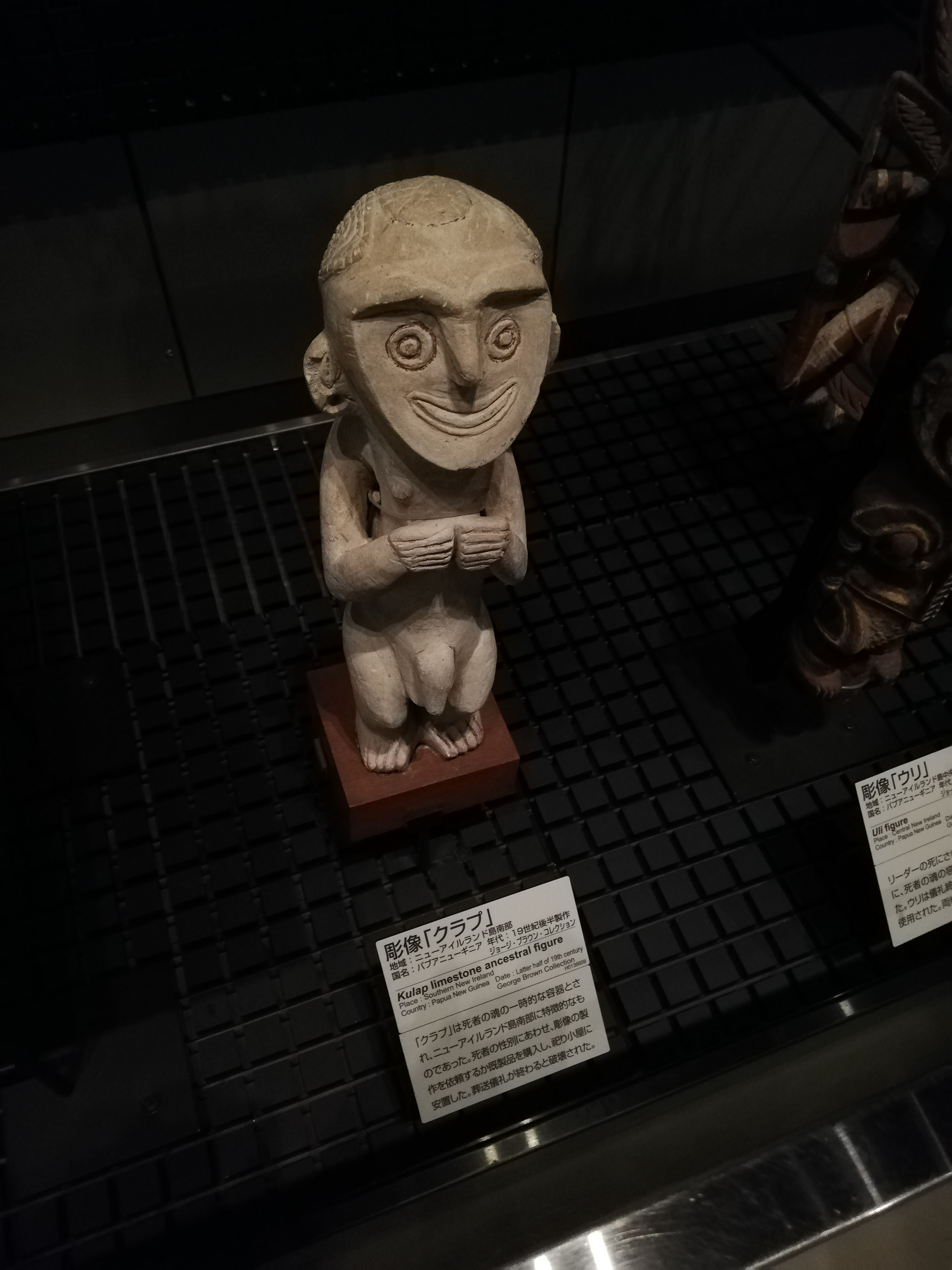
a kulap in National Museum of Ethnology, Japan

The chalk limestone used for carving Kulaps is found in the river beds of the hilly Punam region of southern New Ireland. Recent studies indicate that the figures are also from Muliama on the east coast. In villages where the language spoken is Patpatar, the Kulaps are known by other names, such as Katpuo or Papawa in Saraha village.

Carved Kulaps may sometimes be painted. They are produced by artisans from the Rossel Mountains. They may represent either men or women. Some of these figures are carved in "stylized" form and painted in pure white colour and kept in small enclosures. The figurines represent the dead, generally in a sitting posture. Only specific people were allowed to handle such figures as it was believed that the “spirit" or "soul of the dead” in whose commemoration it was made should be temporarily confined to these figures to prevent them from harming the village environment. However, smaller images of Kulaps made of chalk are kept in houses.

== Rituals ==
Rituals were involved in selecting and making these figures. It involved a male relative of the deceased specifically visiting the Russel Mountain quarries to acquire a suitable stone. The funerary sculpture was made by specialist artists. The carved figure was presented to a local leader in secret, where it would be formally kept, sometimes standing in rows with other kulaps, within leaf-decorated mortuary structures. Only men were allowed to visit the ceremonial enclosure to view and perform rituals to the figures of the dead. Women and children mourned the dead relative from outside the enclosure as they were considered impure to see the figurines. After the specific period of mourning was over, the figure was removed from the shrine in secrecy and destroyed to symbolically represent the release of “the soul into the realm of the ancestors”, otherwise bad spirits could reach the ancestor. These funeral practices are not conducted anymore.
