= Toyokawa Station =

Toyokawa Station (豊川駅) is the name of two train stations in Japan:

- Toyokawa Station (Aichi)
- Toyokawa Station (Osaka)
