= SDAM =

SDAM may refer to:

- Singapore Dark Alternative Movement
- Severely Deficient Autobiographical Memory
- serotonin-dopamine activity modulator, a type of serotonin modulator and stimulator
