= Unobe Station =

Monorail station in Ibaraki, Osaka Prefecture, Japan

Unobe Station 宇野辺駅
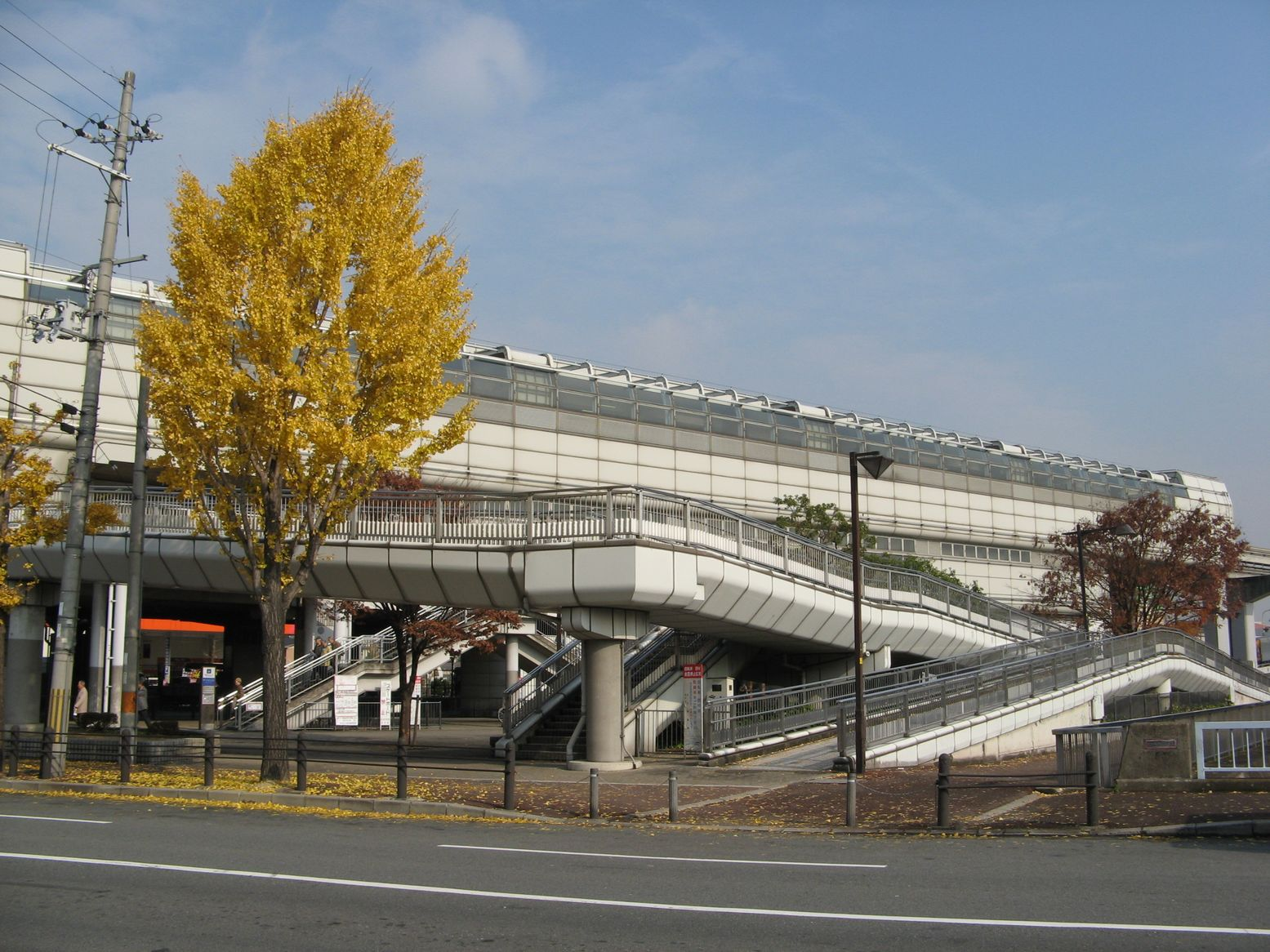
- Station building viewed from the west

General information
- Location: Japan
- Coordinates: 34°48′28.96″N 135°33′16.39″E
- Operator: Osaka Monorail
- Line: Main Line
- Platforms: 1 - Island platform
- Tracks: 2

Construction
- Structure type: Elevated
- Accessible: Yes

Other information
- Station code: 18

History
- Opened: 1 June 1990
Location

Unobe Station (宇野辺駅, Unobe-eki) is a monorail station on the Osaka Monorail located in Ibaraki, Osaka, Japan.

== Lines ==
- Osaka Monorail Main Line (Station Number: 18)

== Layout ==
There is an island platform and two tracks elevated. The platform is sealed in with glass walls and doors.

1	■ Osaka Monorail Main Line	for Kadomashi
2	■ Osaka Monorail Main Line	for Osaka Airport

== History ==
The Osaka Monorail station opened on 1 June 1990, coinciding with the opening of the first phase of the Osaka Monorail Line from Senri-Chūō Station to Minami-Ibaraki station.

The original name of the station, Ibaraki, was the same as the city's main JR train station although there was no direct connection between the JR station and the monorail station. This caused confusion among passengers and finally the monorail station was renamed. On 1 April 1997, it was renamed as Unobe Station.

== Adjacent stations ==
«	Service	»
Osaka Monorail Main Line (18)
Bampaku-kinen-kōen (17)	-	Minami Ibaraki (19)
