= Kōen-higashiguchi Station =

Railway station in Suita, Osaka prefecture, Japan

Kōen-higashiguchi Station 公園東口駅
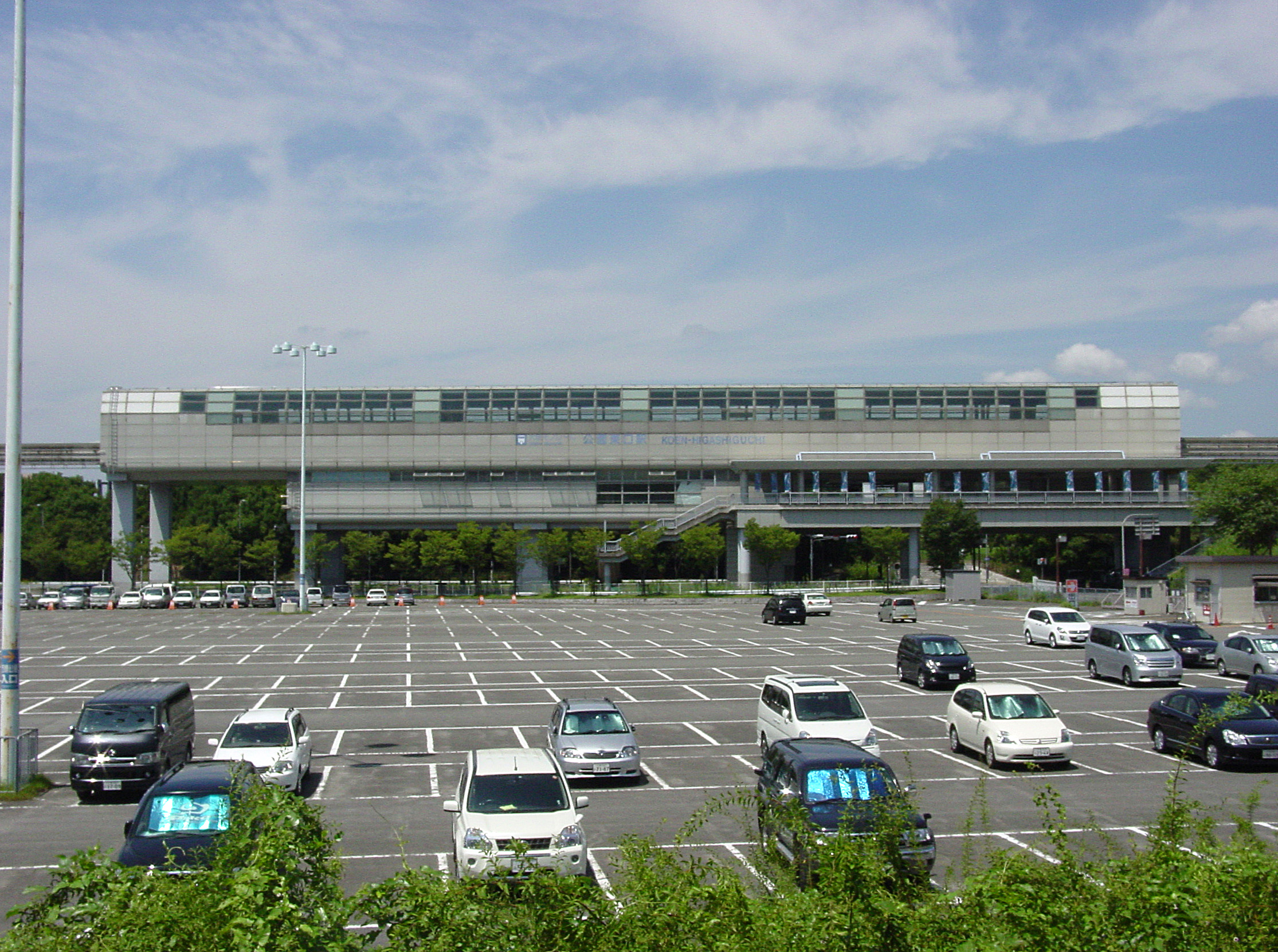
- Station building

General information
- Location: Suita, Osaka; Japan
- Coordinates: 34°48′39.20″N 135°32′22.76″E
- Operator: Osaka Monorail
- Line: Saito Line
- Platforms: 1 island platforms
- Tracks: 2

Construction
- Structure type: Elevated
- Accessible: Yes

Other information
- Station code: 51
- Website: Official website

History
- Opened: 1 October 1998
Location

Kōen-higashiguchi Station (公園東口駅, Kōen-higashiguchi-eki) is a monorail station on the Osaka Monorail located in Suita, Osaka, Japan. It serves as a station for the Expo Commemoration Park.

== Lines ==
- Osaka Monorail Saito Line (Station Number: 51)

== Layout ==
There is an island platform with two tracks.

| 1 | ■ Saito Line | to Saito-nishi |
| 2 | ■ Saito Line | for Bampaku-kinen-kōen and Senri-Chūō |

== Adjacent stations ==
| « | Service | » |
Osaka Monorail Saito Line (51)
| Bampaku-kinen-kōen (17) | - | Handai-byoin-mae (52) |
