= University of Osaka Hospital =

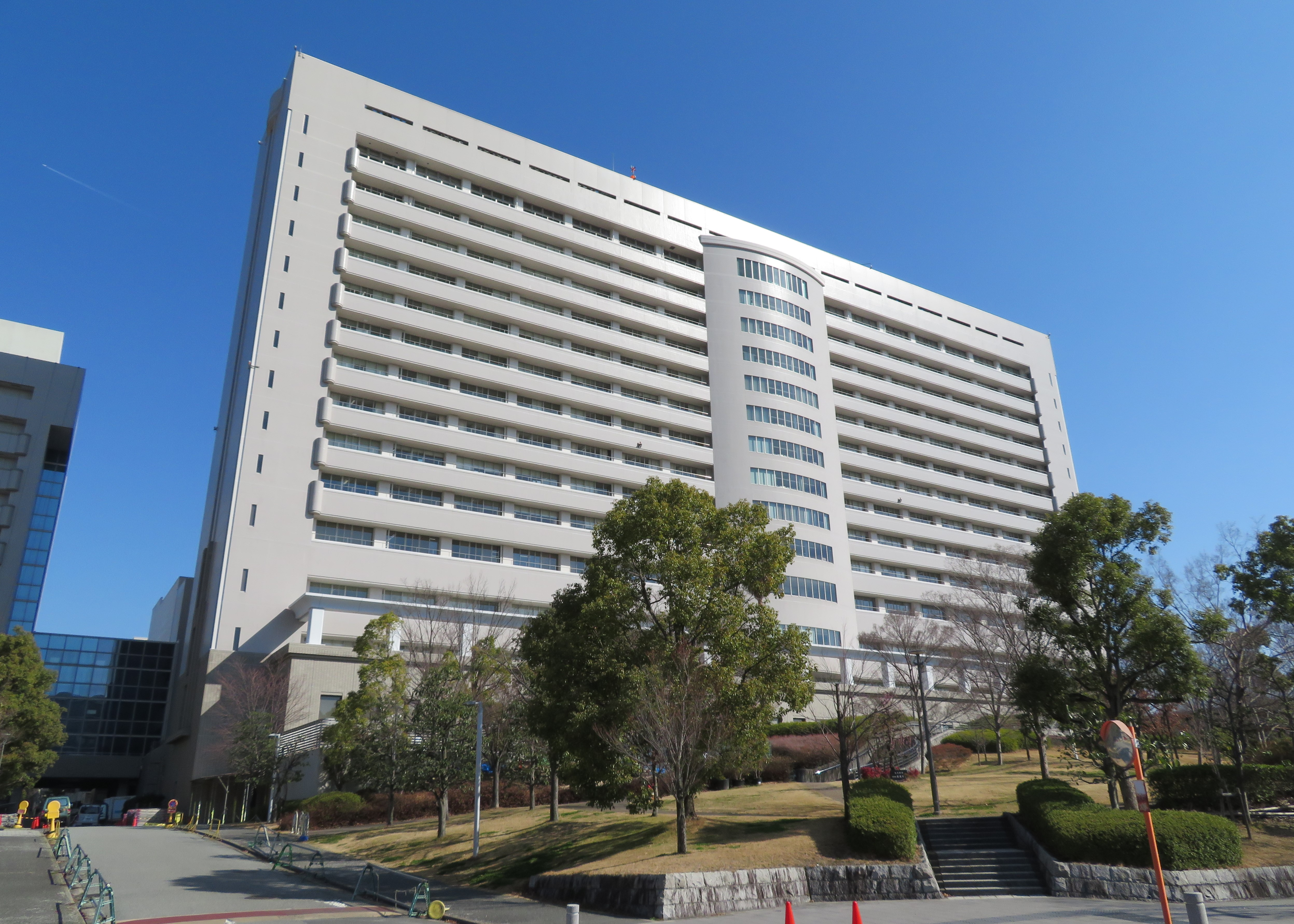
- Main building

Geography
- Location: Suita, Osaka, Japan
- Coordinates: 34°49′10″N 135°31′42″E

Organisation
- Type: Teaching
- Affiliated university: University of Osaka

Services
- Beds: 1086

History
- Opened: 1869

Links
- Website: www.hosp.med.osaka-u.ac.jp

The University of Osaka Hospital (大阪大学医学部附属病院, Ōsaka daigaku igakubu fuzoku byōin) is a university hospital located in Suita, Osaka, Japan, affiliated with The University of Osaka.

== Medical Departments ==
This hospital has following medical departments:

- Department of Medicine
  - Cardiovascular Medicine
  - Nephrology
  - Gastroenterology and Hepatology
  - Metabolic Medicine
  - Respiratory Medicine
  - Clinical Immunology
  - Hematology and Oncology
  - Geriatrics and Hypertension
  - Kampo Medicine
  - General Medicine
- Department of Surgery
  - Cardiovascular
  - General Thoracic
  - Gastroenterological
  - Breast and Endocrine
  - Pediatric
  - Department of Diagnostic Pathology
- Department of Sensory, Cutaneous and Motor Organ Medicine
  - Ophthalmology
  - Otorhinolaryngology-Head and Neck Surgery
  - Orthopaedic Surgery
  - Dermatology
  - Plastic Surgery
  - Rehabilitation Medicine
- Department of Clinical Neuroscience
  - Neurology and Cerebrovascular Diseases
  - Neuropsychiatry
  - Neurosurgery
  - Anesthesiology
- Department of Woman, Child Health and Urology
  - Obstetrics & Gynecology
  - Pediatrics
  - Urology
- Department of Radiology
  - Diagnostic and Interventional Radiology
  - Radiotherapy
  - Nuclear Medicine

== Access ==
- Handai-byōin-mae Station

== See also ==
- University of Osaka
