= Rossel Mountains =

Mountain range

- Location within Papua New Guinea

Geography
- Country: Papua New Guinea
- Region: New Ireland
- Range coordinates: 4°10′S 152°45′E

Geology
- Rock type: Limestone

The Rossel Mountains are a range of mountains on the island of New Ireland, part of Papua New Guinea. They are home to deposits of chalk limestone, from which the kulap figures native to the island are crafted.
