= Toyokawa Station (Osaka) =

Monorail Station in Osaka, Japan

Toyokawa Station 阪大病院前駅
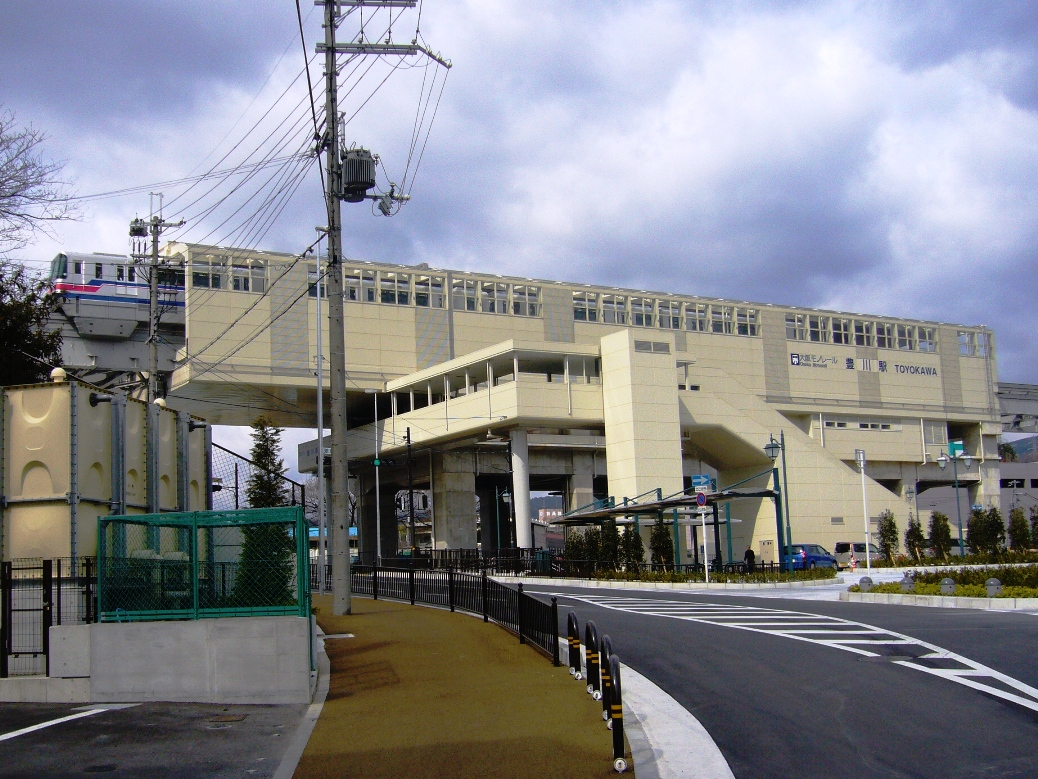
- Station building

General information
- Location: Ibaraki, Osaka; Japan
- Coordinates: 34°50′4.9″N 135°31′36.39″E
- Operator: Osaka Monorail
- Line: Saito Line
- Platforms: 1 island platform
- Tracks: 2

Construction
- Structure type: Elevated
- Accessible: Yes

Other information
- Station code: 53
- Website: Official website

History
- Opened: 19 March 2007
Location

Toyokawa Station (豊川駅, Toyokawa-eki) is a monorail station on the Osaka Monorail located in Ibaraki, Osaka, Japan.

== Lines ==
- Osaka Monorail Saito Line (Station Number: 53)

== History ==
- 19 March 2007 – Station begins operation as the Saito Line extension from Handai-byoin-mae to Saito-nishi opens

== Layout ==
There is an island platform with two tracks.

1	■ Saito Line	to Saito-nishi
2	■ Saito Line	for Bampaku-kinen-kōen and Senri-Chūō

== Adjacent stations ==
«	Service	»
Osaka Monorail Saito Line (53)
Handai-byoin-mae (52)	-	Saito-nishi (54)

== See also ==
- List of railway stations in Japan: T
