= Cosmic Armchair =

Electronic music duo

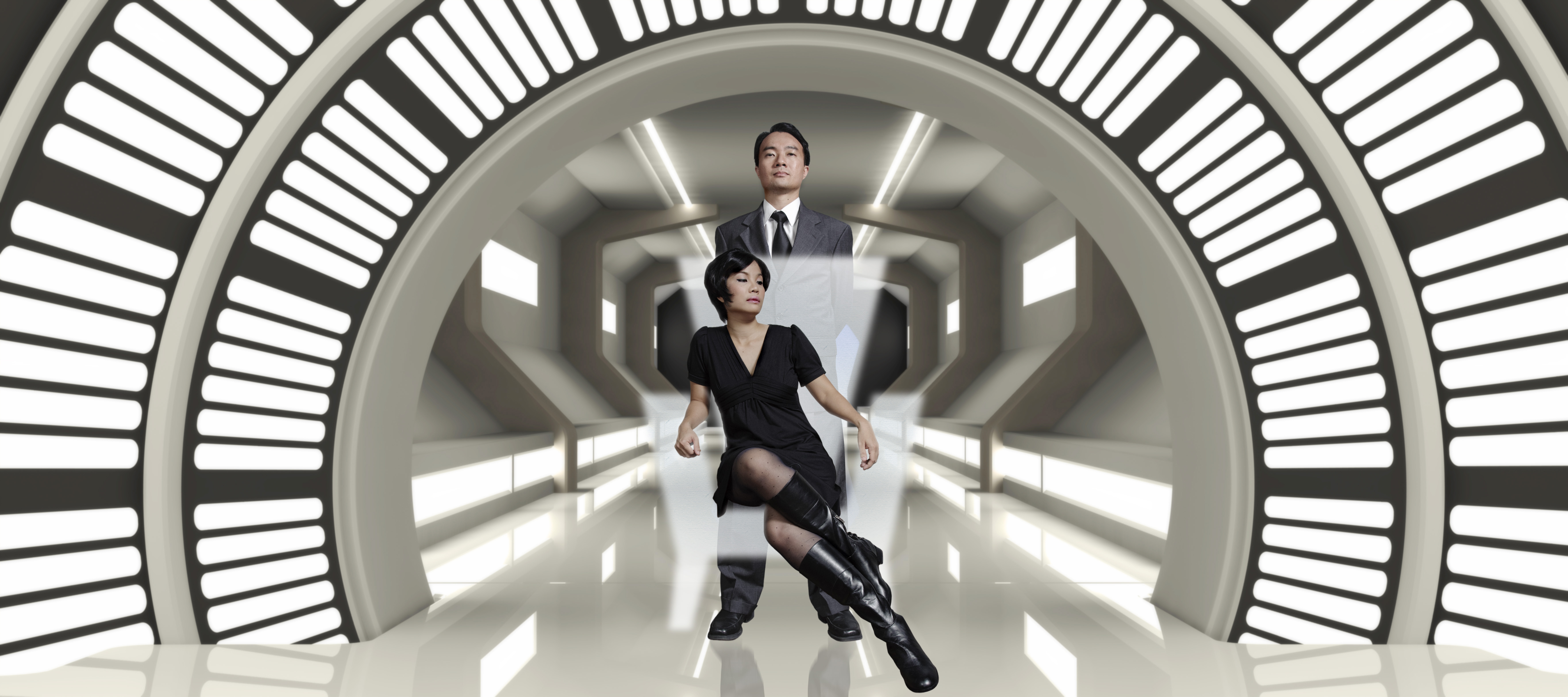
- Cosmic Armchair - electronic pop duo from Singapore

Background information
- Origin: Singapore
- Genres: Synthpop; electropop
- Years active: 2008–present
- Label: Alfa Matrix
- Members: Cosmic Jane, Cosmic Ben
- Website: www.cosmicarmchair.com

Cosmic Armchair are an electronic music duo formed in 2008 in Singapore by Cosmic Jane and Cosmic Ben. The duo are signed to Belgian record label Alfa Matrix.

== History ==
Cosmic Jane and Cosmic Ben first met at the NUS EML (National University of Singapore's Electronic Music Lab). They released their first EP A Different View in 2009 and released their second EP "A Second Look" in 2010. One reviewer praised this EP's "brand new revival to New Wave. It's the kind of song with an 80s influence with less cheesiness in synthesizers" as well as their choice of "recording of a girl speaking in a Singaporean accent".

In August 2010, the duo performed in Baybeats festival.

In 2014 they became the first Asian band to sign an album deal with Belgium-based alternative electronic music label Alfa Matrix which also represents international artists like Front 242, Recoil, Nitzer Ebb and Bruderschaft. This gave them better access to audiences everywhere especially in Europe and America.

This exposed them to overseas music critics in Germany, Sweden, and the UK, receiving favourable reviews of their "euphoric club-friendly tracks full of light trance leads and compelling dance beats permeated by ethereal feminine vocals" and "light and airy chill out track" and "synthpop and new wave waters with a fuller and more cohesive sound".

The critics also gave positive reviews of their remixes for other Alfa Matrix artists like:

- Psy'Aviah - "Eurodance inspired remix" on Psy'Aviah - The Xenogamous Endeavour

- Lovelorn Dolls - "laid-back radio mix" of “Miss Friday Night”

- Mondtraume - "absolutely adored the trance touches in Cosmic Armchair's mix, and really appreciated the final few minutes of the song where the trance went along with the rest of the beat"

They also received critical praise for their cover version of The Cure song Friday I'm in Love "Then Cosmic Armchair hits me with a track so full of candy rave goodness, a guilty pleasure of mine (don’t judge me, that’s my job!), and I am absolutely in love…but hey, it IS Friday. This album gets a thumbs up for this track alone."

Critics in Singapore also enjoyed their ""old school electronic hymns that educe the rave days of the 90s" and they were listed in Singapore newspaper TODAY as one of "Singapore’s electronic music makers".

As part of the Electric Avenue series of concerts also featuring other Singapore electronic musicians like weish, Cosmic Armchair performed two sets at The Esplanade Outdoor Theatre on 11 April 2014.

Alfa Matrix released Cosmic Armchair's third EP We are watching in 2014, and their fourth EP I Don't Belong Here in 2015. The 2015 EP was described as "a sound that comes close to Robyn or La Roux. Catchy electro with a house beat! I Do not Belong Here is a catchy, and with the right mix this could be a club hit."

The duo performed Digital Dondang Sayang featuring Pantun composed by Ben's Peranakan great-grandfather, at NUS Baba House NUS Arts Festival in March 2016.

In November 2016, the duo visited Japan to perform songs from upcoming album at EBISU BATICA, Tokyo and at Treasure River Book Cafe, Chiba, Japan.

In 2017, they released first Album Contact from Alfa Matrix. One reviewer described it as containing "all the best attributes that Cosmic Armchair have represented all these years viz. an authentic channeling of 80s synthpop, now commonly called “synthwave”. Not that Contact is purely retro in scope as there are sufficient modern EDM elements to keep the younger listeners interested."

They were named one of the ”10 Highlights of Past Baybeats that We’ll Never Ever Forget” on Baybeats blog in 2017.

In 2018 they were commissioned by The Esplanade to produce The Sight of Sound, performing original electronic songs while generating live animated images from different characteristics of their music, and inviting the audience to participate in the creative process by creating collaborative artworks inspired by the music.

Psy'Aviah engaged them to remix another song, Hold On, for the 2019 album Soul Searching.

In 2022 their song 'Bleed' was released as "an exclusive 19-track label CD compilation in the April 2022 issue of the unique Gothic magazine" in order to "celebrate 20 years of Alfa Matrix and over 30 years of collaboration in mutual respect and care".

The Electrozombies blog review described Bleed as "classic, melancholic atmosphere. Soundwise with a lot of sad piano and strings and of course rain sounds in the background. The opening is so classic that it could be from L'âme Immortelle."

In 2023, Cosmic Armchair performed at The Esplanade, Singapore, as part of the Red Dot August festival.

== Discography ==
=== Albums ===
Title	Details
Contact	Released: 17 November 2017; Label: Alfa Matrix

=== EPs/Singles ===
- A Different View (2009)
- A Second Look (2010)
- We Are Watching (Alfa Matrix, 2014)
- I Don't Belong Here (Alfa Matrix, 2014)
- O Come O Come Emmanuel (2017)
- Falling (Alfa Matrix, 2018)
- Cannonballs (Alfa Matrix, 2018)
- Valentine (Alfa Matrix, 2018)
- Frontiers (Sight of Sound Remix) (2018)
- See You (Sooner) (Alfa Matrix, 2019)

=== Remixes ===
- Our Singapore (Cosmic Armchair Remix) (2019)

=== Compilation albums ===
- Matrix Downloaded 003 (Alfa Matrix, 2014)
- A strange play - an alfa matrix tribute to The Cure (Alfa Matrix, 2014)
- Matrix Downloaded 010 (Alfa Matrix, 2021)
