= Hattori Ryokuchi Park =

Park in northern Osaka, Japan

Coordinates: 34°46′35.53″N 135°29′5.87″E

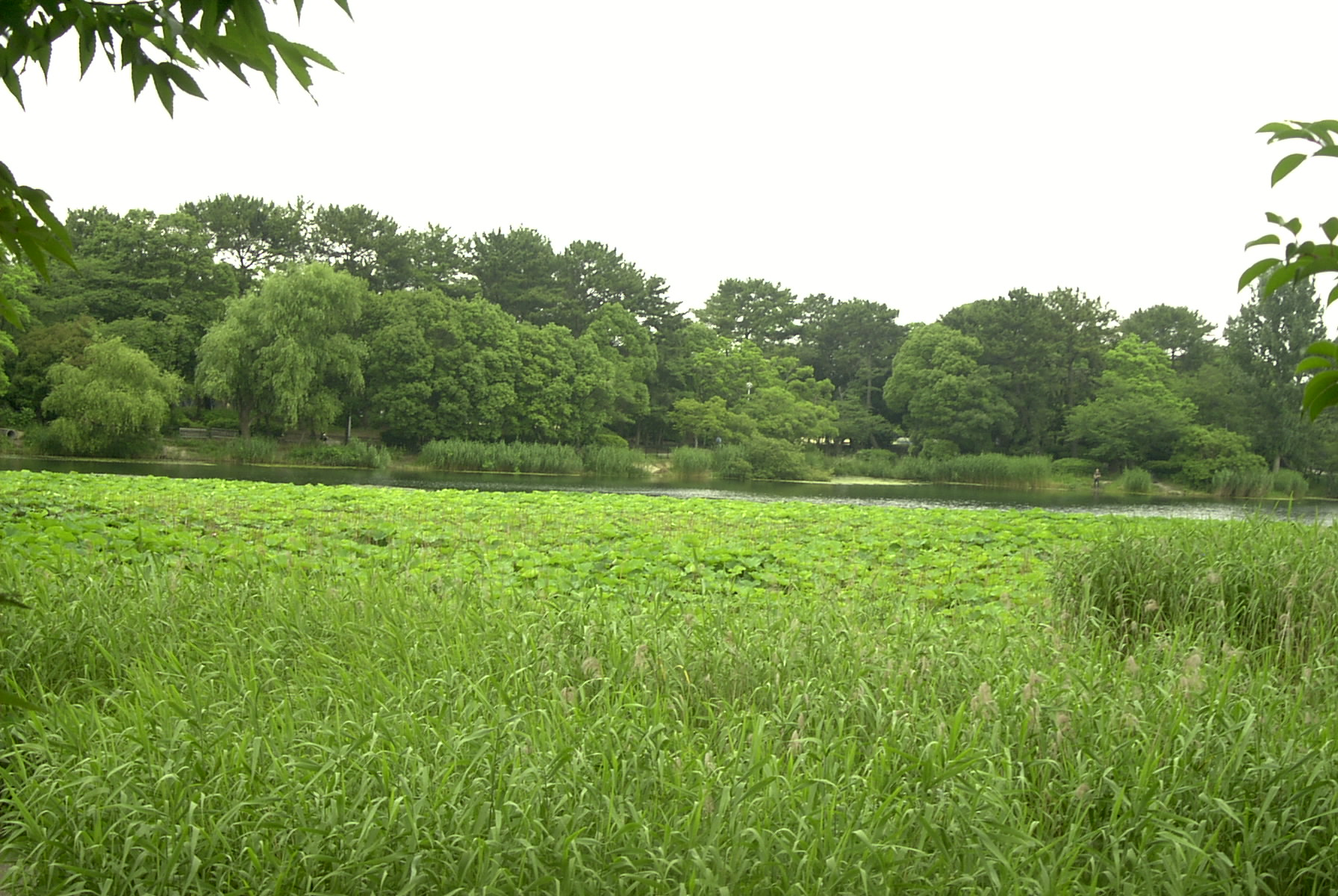
A large pond in Ryokuchi Koen.

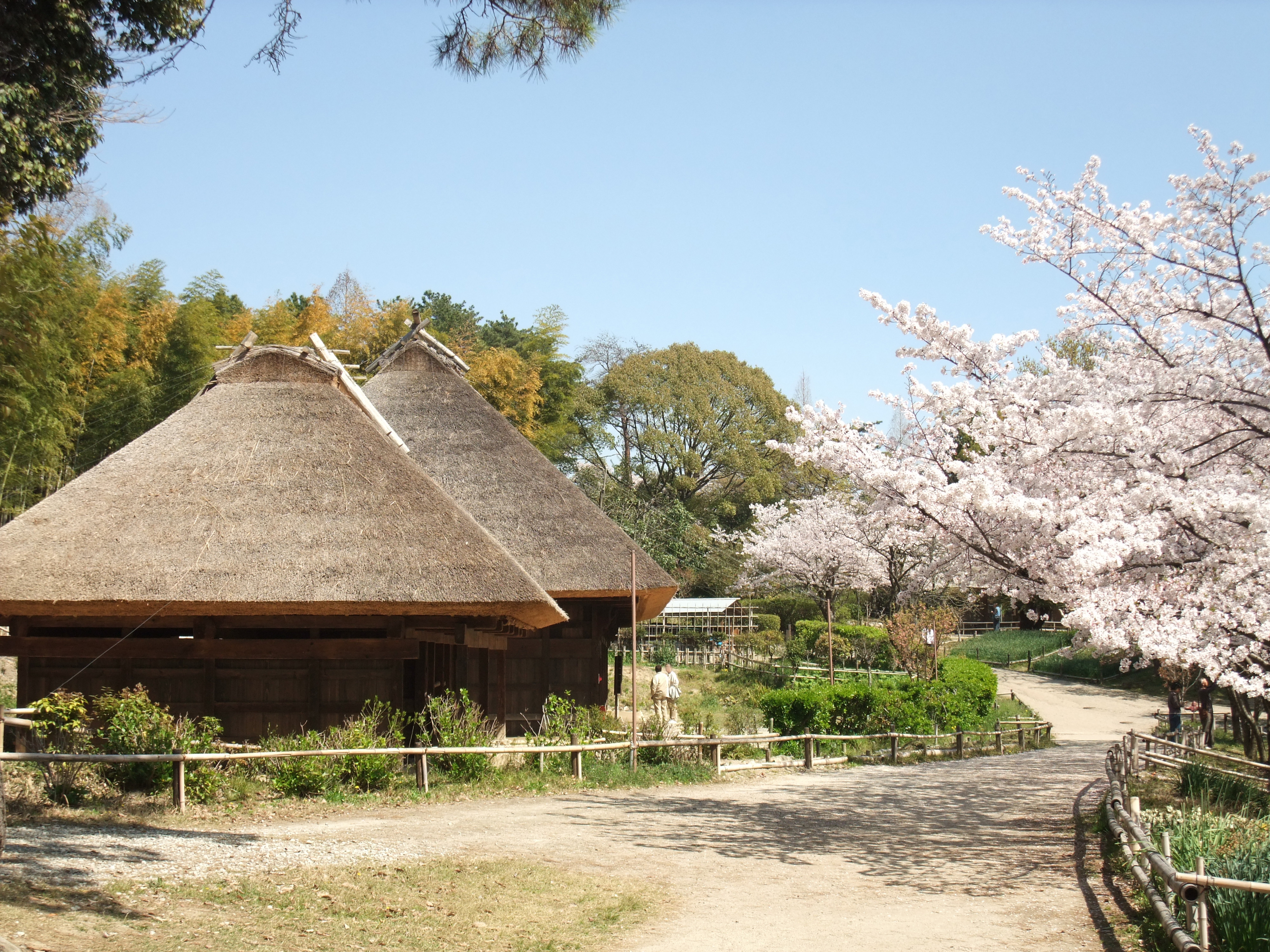
Old Japanese Farm House Museum

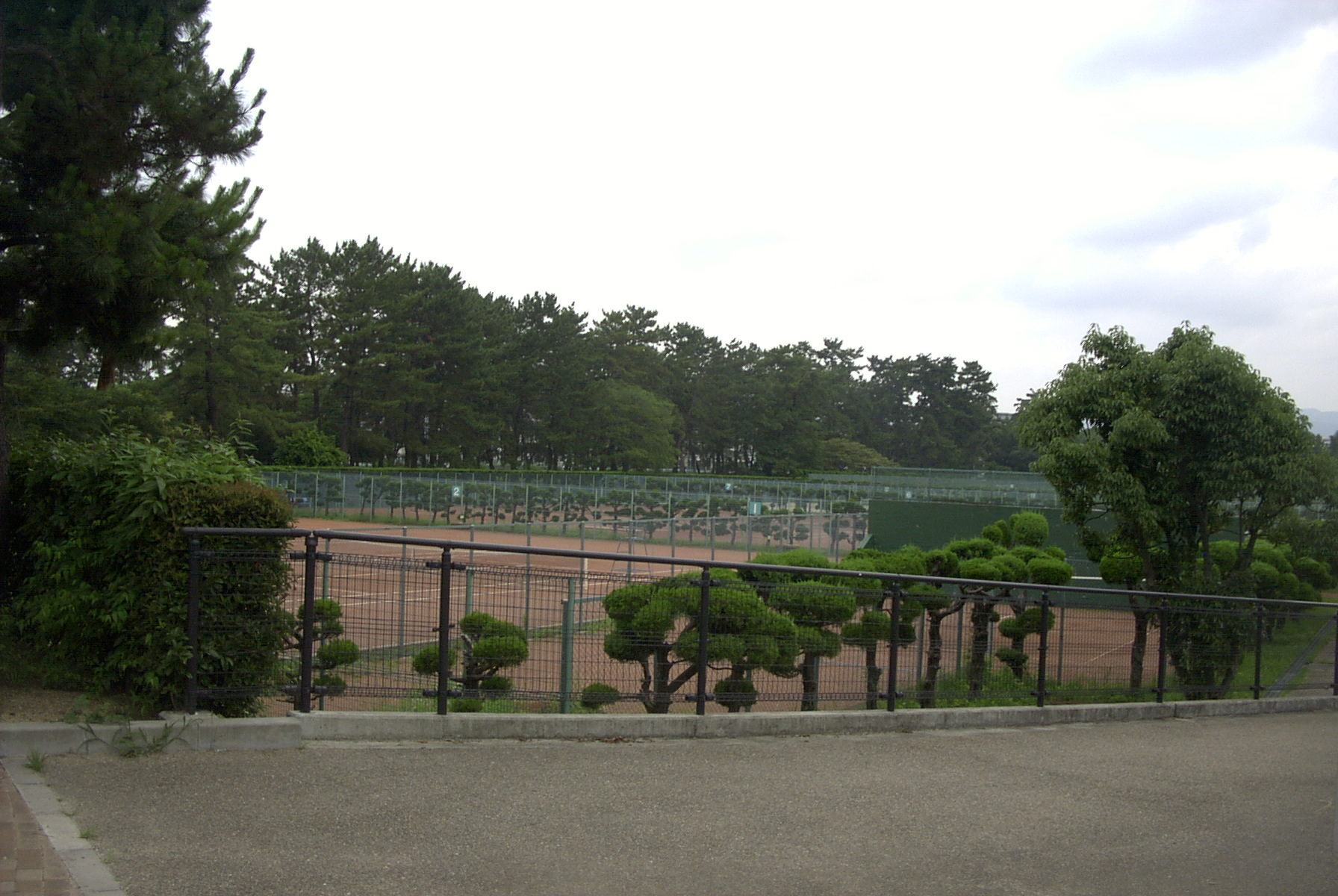
Tennis courts in the park, surrounded by sculpted trees.

Hattori Ryokuchi Park (服部緑地公園, Hattori Ryokuchi Kōen) is a large, hilly park in northern Osaka. It is most famous for its Open-Air Museum of Old Japanese Farmhouses, which contains examples of rural architecture from various parts of Japan. It also contains tennis courts, bamboo gardens, ponds, playgrounds, flower gardens, a concert hall, a "flower road", a horseback riding track, and a "water world".

Hattori (服部) is the name of this region of the city, while ryokuchi (緑地) is a generic word for a green space, used for numerous other urban parks.

There was a YHA youth hostel in the park that closed at the end of August 2011.

== Hydro park ==
There are recreational pools directly adjoining the public park in the south-west. Channelling of two rivers, between which rests the park, was developed into the current city waterworks, feeding both the park's ponds, the recreational (swimming) pools, and the fishing-pond separating the parks from the adjacent Temple.

== Access ==
The Midosuji subway line has a station to the east of the park. Get off at the Ryokuchi-kōen Station and walk west for about 5 minutes.
