= National Health and Nutrition Survey =

The National Health and Nutritional Survey (国民健康・栄養調査, Kokumin Kenkou Eiyou Chousa; NHNS) is a national health examination survey conducted in Japan. Beginning as the National Nutrition Survey (NNS) after World War II, it is the oldest of all such surveys currently conducted in the world as of December 2015. The NHNS is the only health examination and interview survey conducted nationally in Japan to obtain general information on health, nutrition, and physical activity.

== History ==
=== National Nutrition Survey ===
The NNS began in 1945 in the 35 wards of the Tokyo Metropolitan Area, expanding to a nationwide survey in 1948, although it did not include Okinawa until 1972. It was conducted under the General Headquarters of the Supreme Commander of the Allied Forces until 1952 when the Nutrition Improvement Law was passed, explicitly stating the aims and enforcement of the NNS.

On 11 December 1945, a memo was published by the General Headquarters describing five imperatives: the need for factual information regarding nutritional health, actual food consumption, and Japanese food requirements; the establishment of a study group of physicians and nutritionists to conduct nutrition surveys among the civilian population; the submission of a complete, operational plan for approval with a deadline of 20 December 1945; the implementation of coordination and standardization by the Japanese government per plans approved by the General Headquarters; and the immediate implementation of the approved plans. Per the 11 December memorandum, the urban areas that contained the largest and densest civilian population (i.e. Tokyo) were of primary concern. The original survey was conducted four times a year (in February, May, August, and November), beginning in 1946. Survey areas within the wards of Tokyo were divided into urban and rural areas that served as a comparison between consumers and producers, respectively. The survey then expanded to include four urban cities and 19 rural prefectures, sampled in February, and expanded again to nine urban cities and 27 prefectures, sampled in May, August, and November.

Additional areas, such as three coal-producing regions in Fukuoka, Fukushima, and Hokkaido, and a mining region in Akita, were also targeted. Other populations, such as railway workers in Tokyo were also selected to be assessed separately.

The National Nutrition Survey was redesigned and renamed as the NHNS in 2003 following the passage of the Health Promotion Act to cover aspects of health related to the risks of non-communicable diseases.

=== National Health and Nutrition Survey ===
The NHNS is a cross-sectional study based on household interviews and examinations of randomly selected participants from 5,000 households. It is conducted every year in November. The survey is the responsibility of the Ministry of Health, Labour and Welfare (MHLW), which plans and budgets the NHNS; the Statistics and Informatics Department of the ministry then conducts the sampling within the chosen survey areas. The Department of Nutritional Epidemiology at the National Institute of Health and Nutrition analyse the survey data, which is then published by the MHLW.

== Aims ==
The NNS began after the end of World War II due to the severe malnutrition that was widespread among Japanese people due to food shortages. The NNS was thus a way to monitor the nutritional quality of Japanese diets in order to inform food supply acquisitions from foreign countries as part of foreign aid.

== Methodology ==
When the survey became nationwide (then 46 prefectures in 1948), the sampling design changed from intentional to random selection; the random selection method was implemented in three clusters: 12 small, medium, and large cities that had populations greater than 30,000 people. The survey was updated again in 1952, with the survey area selected using a stratified, multi-stage sampling method that divided urban areas (defined as large and medium cities with a population greater than 100,000, and small cities with a population between 30,000 and 100,000) from rural ones. The previous surveys of special target areas and populations were abolished.

In 1956, the division of participants became stratified according to type of employment.

== Limitations ==
As of 2011, the data from the NHNS are largely available only to researchers conducting government-tasked research, rather than the general public. The data that are made accessible are not in the original, raw form, but rather the results of calculations made at the National Institute of Health and Nutrition. A lack of comprehensive reporting on the survey design limits the ability to assure and control the quality of the data; reports on survey methodology from the government are of poor quality. There is also a lack of transparency, i.e. the methods to calculate standardized portion sizes (used when respondents do not weigh the food they eat) are not officially reported.
