= Baybeats =

Music festival in Singapore

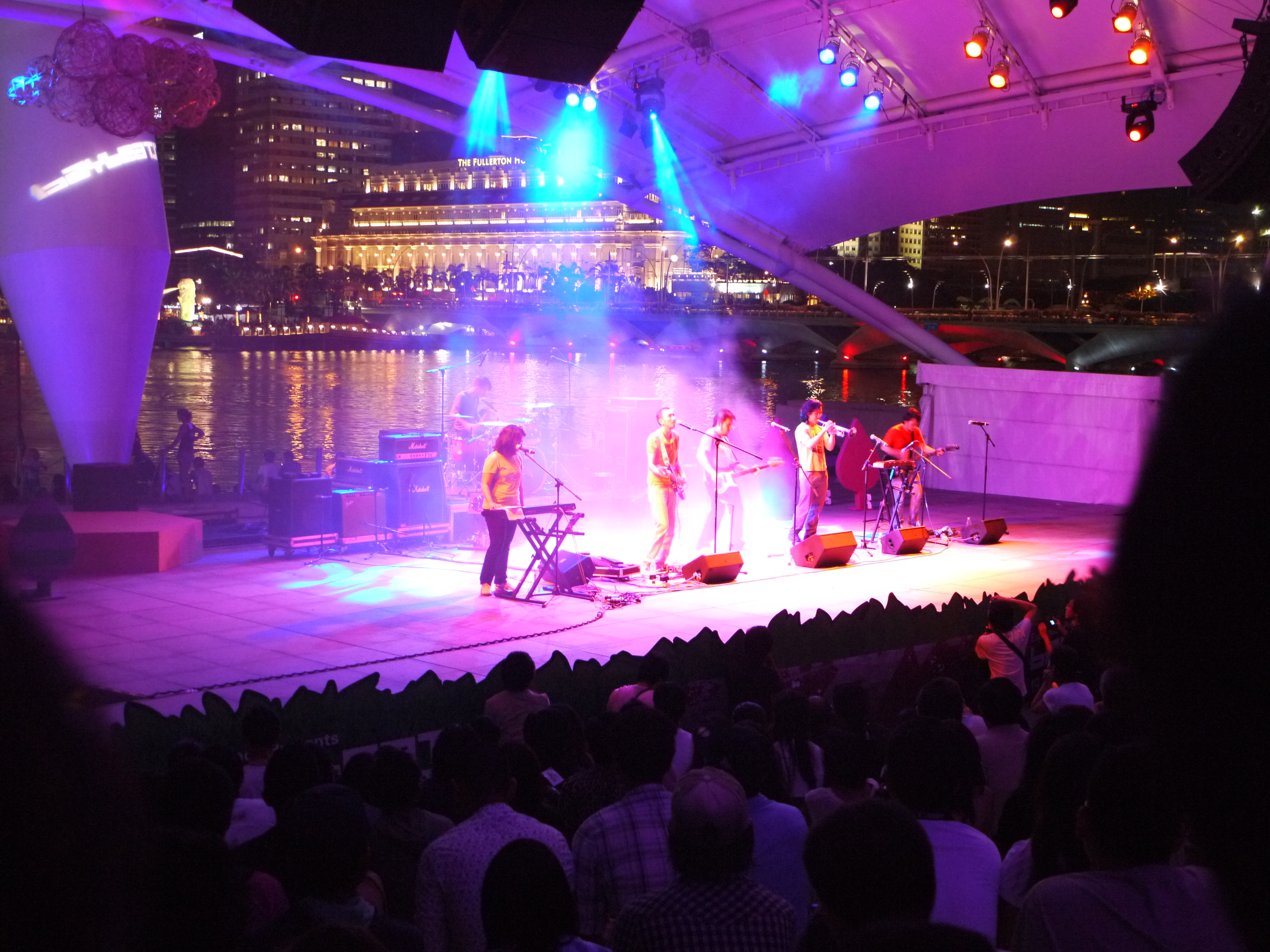
- Genre: Alternative, Indie, Folk, Pop, Metal, Post-rock, Emo, Punk, Electro etc.
- Location: Singapore
- Years active: 2002-Present

Baybeats is an annual 3-day alternative music festival organized by Esplanade, and held in Singapore. It showcases various local acts such as regional and international artists. The festival is located at Esplanade – Theatres on the Bay and is free.

== History ==
Baybeats was thought up by John Chiong of local music company, Wake Me Up Music, in 2001 and launched in 2002.

The inaugural festival in 2002 was attended by around 9,000 people.

In 2006, Baybeats started auditions for bands to perform during the festival.

In 2007, the festival started a mentorship programme, Baybeats Budding Bands, to let bands who passed the festival's auditions to be mentored by the local music scene. After the mentorship, selected bands get to perform at the festival. The 2007 festival was attended by 69,000 people.

In 2008, Baybeats was solely organised by the Esplanade. The festival also included five short films to be screened during the festival.

In 2021, the festival was held over four days for the first time instead of three days.

== See also ==
- List of electronic music festivals
- Live electronic music
