= National Museum of Ethnology (Japan) =

Museum in Osaka Prefecture, Japan

- 国立民族学博物館
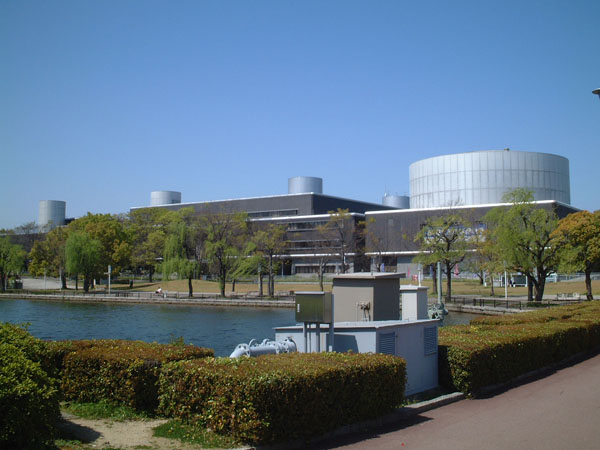
- National Museum of Ethnology
- Established: 1977
- Location: Suita, Osaka
- Coordinates: 34°48′46.30″N 135°31′46.86″E
- Founder: Umesao Tadao
- Director: Kenji Yoshida
- Public transit access: Bampaku-kinen-kōen Station (Osaka Monorail)
- Website: www.minpaku.ac.jp/en

The National Museum of Ethnology (国立民族学博物館, Kokuritsu Minzoku-gaku Hakubutsukan), also known as the Minpaku (民博), is the largest ethnographic museum in Japan. It is Japan's largest research institute in the academic disciplines of humanities and social sciences. It is located within the Expo Commemoration Park, which is on the former grounds of Expo '70, in Suita, Osaka Prefecture.

== History ==
The museum was established in 1974 and opened to the public in 1977. Its first director was Umesao Tadao (1920–2010), who served as the museum's director from 1974 to 1993.

== Collection and exhibitions ==
The museum's founding collection is known as the Attic Collection. Created by Keizo Shibusawa, the collection is an early 20th-century ethnological collection of mainly Japanese materials, including some early finds of Jōmon archaeological artifacts (in the Morse Collection). Further collections were brought together for the opening in 1977 and collecting activities have continued since.

The main focus of collection has been film, still images, sound recordings, and objects representing diverse aspects of everyday life, from farming to food, urban life, folk crafts, and religion. Permanent galleries for all large regions of the world display only part of the full collection. The galleries are ordered by geographical region and have a decentralized layout.

The museum hosts two special exhibitions yearly in spring and autumn, with each lasting three months. It also hosts smaller temporary exhibitions on special themes.

== Research and education ==
The museum has a staff of approximately 70 researchers, and actively supports visits by scholars around Japan and abroad. The museum library is one of the largest academic, multiple-language reference libraries in Japan, with books and journals in Japanese, English, Chinese, Spanish, French, and various other languages. The library is linked to a national network of public university libraries.

The museum offers PhD courses in association with Japan's Inter-University of Advanced Graduate Studies (Sōkendai), an inter-institutional organization that provides administration for students placed in public research institutes and laboratories all over Japan.

The National Museum of Ethnology is also a founding member of the National Institutes for Humanities (NIHU), Japan.

== Publications ==
Research journals and series published by the National Museum of Ethnology include:

Journals

- Bulletin of the National Museum of Ethnology (国立民族学博物館研究報告)
- TRAJECTORIA

Series

- Senri Ethnological Studies (SES)
- Senri Ethnological Reports (SER)

Magazines and newsletters

- Minpaku Monthly (月刊みんぱく)
- Minpaku Tsushin (民博通信)
- Minpaku Anthropology Newsletter
