= Saito Nagasaki =

- Saito Nagasaki, 2007

Background information
- Also known as: DJ Renegade
- Born: 22 July 1981 (age 44)
- Origin: Singapore
- Genres: Futurepop, Industrial music, Electronic Body Music, trance music
- Occupation(s): Musician, Producer, DJ, Promoter
- Instrument(s): Turntables; Keyboard
- Years active: 2002 - present
- Labels: Netmanagement, Hamburg
- Website: SDAM

Saito Nagasaki (born 22 July 1981) is the founding member of the Singapore Dark Alternative Movement (SDAM), an alternative, non-profit social collective, and a Singaporean Promoter (entertainment) and Disc Jockey. Nagasaki is associated with Singapore's goth subculture and underground BDSM scene in the media and champions alternative culture in Singapore. Saito Nagasaki is credited with starting Singapore's first Goth club night, "Heart of Darkness" (hosted at Gashaus) as well as the nation's longest-running dedicated alternative music night, "Alternation" (hosted at DXO, Esplanade - Theatres on the Bay) which lasted 31 weeks since its launch on 9 August 2007 to the finale on 6 March 2008. Nagasaki is also associated with X'ho, a veteran Singaporean Musician and Radio Disc Jockey who currently anchors the "Lush Night" program on Lush 99.5FM; the two have held several DJ residencies together since the launch of Heart of Darkness on 7 March 2007, with X'ho playing under the moniker "DJ Mentor".

== Promoter career in Western Australia ==
After moving to Perth, Western Australia, to study in 2002, Nagasaki began his mobile disco / events outfit, Outbreed which was his vehicle for over 20 singular events and club nights, which included fashion shows and raves, in the state.

Nagasaki originally formed Outbreed with Zebedee Paterson and John Webb, two friends who met Saito while they were mutually members of the Perth Order of Gothic Societies (POGS). Notable events done by outbreed include Digital Injection, a controversial all-ages, 24-hour rave and LAN party that substantiated due to Nagasaki's exploitation of a loophole in licensing. Digital Injection was described as a success and still managed to accrue sponsorship from Thermaltake for prizes for the LAN component despite the underground nature of the event. Another notable event was "Arkham", an asylum themed Gothic fashion parade and art exhibition that Nagasaki conducted in an old church, The Claremont Town Hall or the "old Wesley Church".

== Return to Singapore ==
Upon return to Singapore in 2005, Nagasaki rapidly adapted to the thriving local music scene, quickly establishing Outbreed in the city-state as a local independent label / agent and began recruiting Singaporean live acts to commercially represent such as Flybar, Ronin, Project Ultrasound, The Sexies, Bad Obsession, Launchbox and TIEN.

Nagasaki entered into a trilateral business relationship through Gashaus with the iLLers and Projekts as well as sponsors Nokia (presenting Sponsor) and Adidas to create Flow!, the largest indoor music festival ever to take place in Singapore on the 2006-12-06 at Ministry of Sound Singapore. Nagasaki served as Flow's Event Manager and almost singlehandedly executed the production of 20 bands across 4 stages. The event was enormously successful with excess of 3200 attendees, and hailed as a monumental 'long overdue' effort for local music in Singapore.

Saito's Singapore Goth event debut "Heart of Darkness" won critical acclaim in Time Out magazine's Singapore Edition as the Number 1 critic's choice, ranking above Zouk's "Readyset Glo, The Motored Sessions" and Ministry of Sound Singapore's "Godskitchen Presents Les Hemlock".

== Musician and DJ career ==
In an interview with the Straits Times on Razor.tv, Saito revealed that his moniker was an amalgam created by combining the Japanese city Nagasaki as a fictional surname with the family name of Saitō Hajime (Rurouni Kenshin) as a first name. He allegedly came up with the name as both a means of masquerading as an ethnic Japanese to rebrand himself and gain more show opportunities while in Australia. Saito originally used the moniker "DJ Renegade" initially before switching to the present Japanese pseudonym.

DJ Residencies

Year	Event name	Venue	Country
2002	Radium Labs	Gilkisons Dance Studio	Australia
2003	The Haven	Old Brizzy Bar	Australia
2004	The Adrenalin Experiment	Big Apple Club and Bar	Australia
2006	Ghast	Gashaus	Singapore
2006–2007	Heart of Darkness	Gashaus	Singapore
2007–2008	Alternation	DXO	Singapore
2008	Dark Friday	LEGENDS @ Orchard	Singapore
2009	Dark Friday	Night and Day Bar	Singapore

Saito formed a now-defunct Electronic Body Music/Futurepop outfit Divine9 with Chad Zarkk Ostrowski (guitarist and vocalist) and Glenn William Wallace (bassist) in Perth, that failed to achieve much success. The band failed to pass the first leg of the 2005 "Next Big Thing" band competition. Chad left the band due to a no-show at the competition date and Shane Ross was an emergency stand-in vocalist. The band would undergo a line-up change, adding members of Perth Cover band Airbag; Shane Ross (vocalist), Steve Balaban (guitarist) and Tim Fikas (drummer). Nagasaki brought the new Divine9 on a promotional tour in Singapore for December 2005, playing at Home Club (2005-12-22), IJ Studio (2005-12-23) and a newly opened Gashaus (2005-12-24). During Flow!, Saito brought Divine9 over again as the headlining act for the festival on the main stage of Ministry of Sound Singapore, this time replacing Steve with Shannon Noll's guitarist Leigh Siragusa.

Saito was ultimately more successful with solo Disc Jockey work, with notable performances such as opening for Sheep on Drugs (2003-07-05 at The Rosemount Hotel, Perth), Interlace (Sweden) on 2006-03-30 at Home Club, Singapore during their phoenix Tour, Alec Empire of Atari Teenage Riot (2007-09-20 at DXO during Alternation, Singapore), DJ Panic (Pure Industrial, UK), resident DJ of the world's longest-running Goth nightclub, Slimelight at Bridge Bar on 2008-09-05 as well as a back-to-back ("Versus set") set with Eskil Simonsson, frontman of Covenant (Sweden). on 2008-10-03 at Dark Friday and opening for Angelspit's Zoog and DestroyX. on 2009-12-05
