= Bampaku-kinen-kōen Station =

Monorail station in Suita, Osaka Prefecture, Japan

Bampaku-kinen-kōen Station 万博記念公園駅
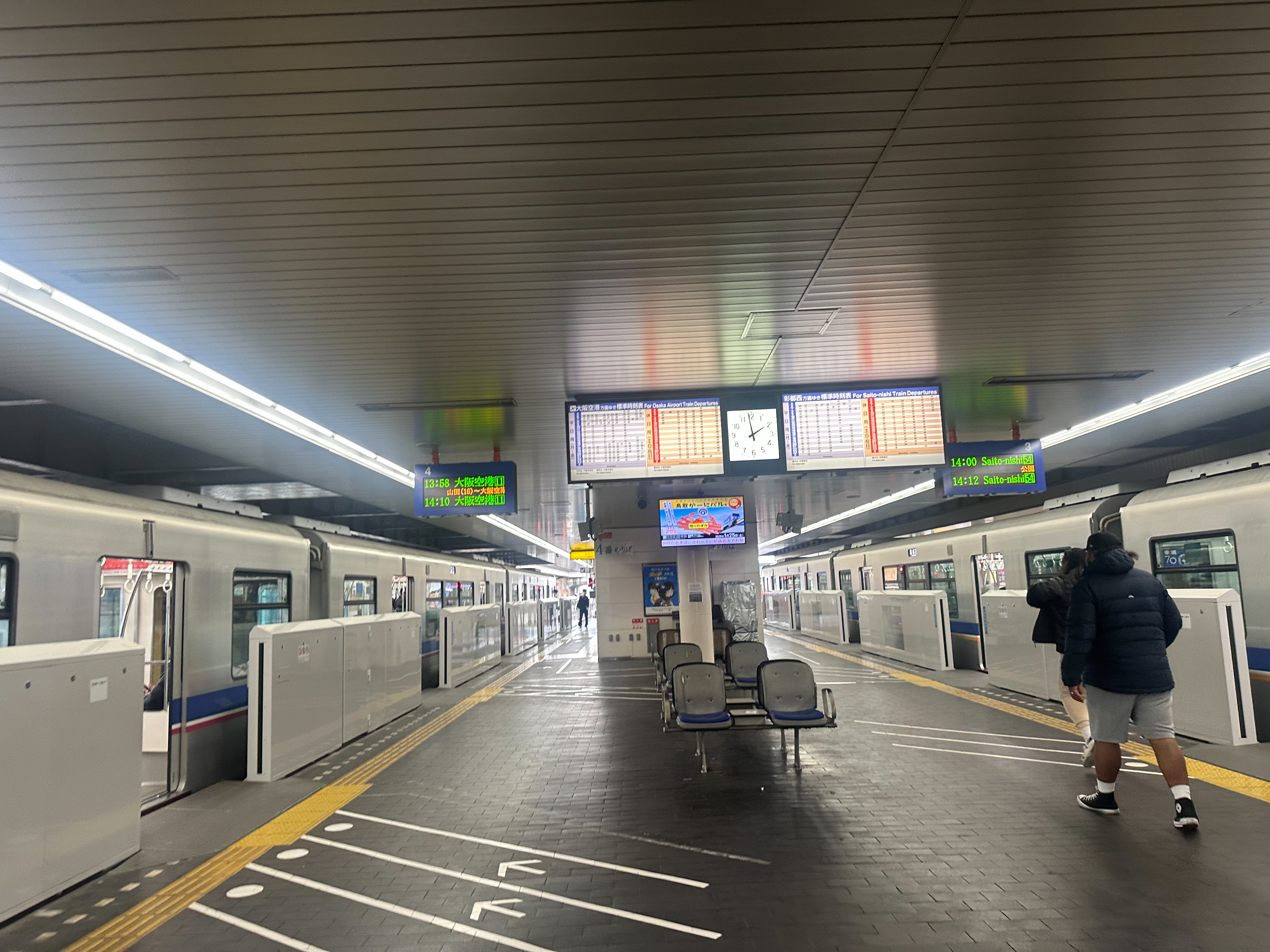
- Train of the Saito and Main Line at Bampaku-kinen-kōen Station

General information
- Location: Suita, Osaka; Japan
- Coordinates: 34°48′24.33″N 135°31′48.53″E
- Operator: Osaka Monorail
- Lines: Main Line; Saito Line
- Platforms: 2 island platforms
- Tracks: 4

Construction
- Structure type: Elevated
- Accessible: Yes

Other information
- Station code: 17
- Website: Official website

History
- Opened: 1 June 1990

Services
Preceding station	Osaka Monorail	Following station
Yamada	Main Line	Unobe
Terminus	Saito Line	Koen-higashiguchi
Location

Bampaku-kinen-kōen Station (万博記念公園駅, Bampaku-Kinen-Kōen-eki) is a monorail station on the Osaka Monorail located in Suita, Osaka, Japan. It serves as the station for the Expo Commemoration Park. It is also the transfer station from the Main Line to the Saito Line, acting as the Saito Line terminus.

== Lines ==
- Osaka Monorail
  - Main Line (Station Number: 17)
  - Saito Line (Station Number: 17)

== Layout ==
- There are two island platforms. Platforms 1 and 4 are for the Main Line, whereas 2 and 3 are for the Saito Line.

1	■ Main Line	for Minami-Ibaraki, Dainichi and Kadomashi
2	■ Saito Line	for Saito-nishi
2	■ Main Line	starting for Kadomashi
3	■ Saito Line	for Saito-nishi
4	■ Main Line	for Yamada, Senri-Chūō, Hotarugaike and Osaka Airport

== History ==
The Osaka Monorail station opened on 1 June 1990, coinciding with the opening of the first phase of the Osaka Monorail Line from Senri-Chūō Station to Minami-Ibaraki station.

== Adjacent stations ==
«	Service	»
Osaka Monorail Main Line (17)
Yamada (16)	-	Unobe (18)
Osaka Monorail Saito Line (17)
Terminus	-	Koen-higashiguchi (51)
