= Osaka Monorail Saito Line =

Monorail line in Osaka, Japan

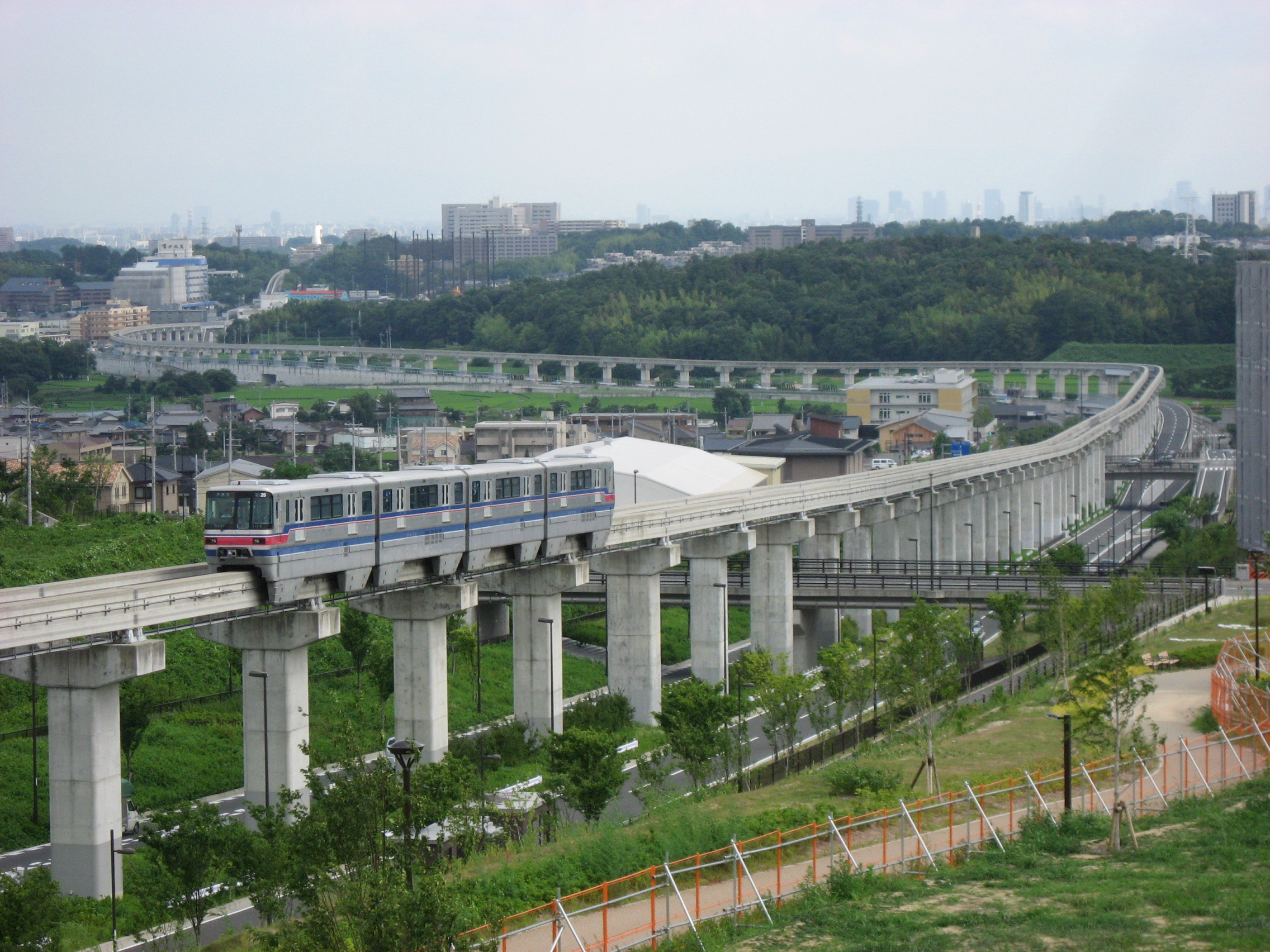
- Saito Line

Overview
- Native name: 国際文化公園都市線（彩都線）
- Locale: Osaka
- Termini: Bampaku-kinen-kōen Station; Saito-nishi Station
- Stations: 5

Service
- Type: Monorail
- Operator(s): Osaka Monorail

Technical
- Line length: 6.8 km (4.2 mi)
- Electrification: 1,500 V DC

Osaka Monorail Saito Line (大阪モノレール彩都線, Ōsaka Monorēru Saito sen) is the monorail route of the Osaka Monorail which runs from Banpaku-Kinen-Koen in Suita, Osaka Prefecture to Saito-nishi Station. The line opened in two stages – on 1 October 1998, from Bampaku-kinen-koen Station to Handai-byoin-mae Station, and on 19 March 2007, to Saito-nishi Station, in Ibaraki, about a kilometer from the Osaka University of Foreign Studies in Minoh. The branch is 6.8 km (4.2 mi) long.

An extension was planned north of Saito-nishi Station, but plans were dropped on 27 January 2017 due to a lack of profitability as the zoning around the proposed extension was switched from residential to industrial.

== Stations ==
Station No.	Station	Japanese	Distance	Transfers	Location	
17	Bampaku-kinen-kōen	万博記念公園	0.0 km (0 mi)	Osaka Monorail Main Line	Suita	Osaka; Prefecture
51	Kōen-higashiguchi	公園東口	1.1 km (0.68 mi)		Suita	Osaka; Prefecture
52	Handai-byōin-mae	阪大病院前	2.6 km (1.6 mi)		Ibaraki	Osaka; Prefecture
53	Toyokawa	豊川	4.2 km (2.6 mi)		Ibaraki	Osaka; Prefecture
54	Saito-nishi	彩都西	6.8 km (4.2 mi)		Ibaraki	Osaka; Prefecture
