= Saito-nishi Station =

Monorail station in Osaka, Japan

Saito-nishi Station 彩都西駅
- Saito-nishi station in June 2026

General information
- Location: Ibaraki, Osaka; Japan
- Coordinates: 34°51′19.77″N 135°31′22.55″E
- Operator: Osaka Monorail
- Line: Osaka Monorail Saito Line
- Platforms: 1 Island platform
- Tracks: 2

Construction
- Structure type: Below-grade
- Accessible: Yes

Other information
- Station code: 54
- Website: Official website

History
- Opened: March 19, 2007
Location

Saito-nishi Station (彩都西駅, Saito-nishi-eki) is a monorail station on the Osaka Monorail located in Ibaraki, Osaka, Japan. It is the terminus of the line. The station is located near Osaka University Minoh Campus.

== Lines ==
- Osaka Monorail Saito Line (Station Number: 54)

== History ==
- 19 March 2007 – Station begins operation as the Saito Line extension from Handai-byoin-mae to Saito-nishi opens.

== Layout ==
There is an island platform with two tracks.

1	■ Saito Line	Only for getting off
2	■ Saito Line	for Bampaku-kinen-kōen and Senri-Chūō

== Adjacent stations ==
«	Service	»
Osaka Monorail Saito Line (54)
Toyokawa (53)	-	Terminus
