= Kazutoshi =

- Gender: Male

Origin
- Origin: Japanese
- Meaning: Different meanings depending on the kanji used

Kazutoshi (written: 和寿, 和敏, 和俊, 幸俊 or 一年) is a masculine Japanese given name. Notable people with the name include:

- Kazutoshi Hatano (波多野 和俊; born 1979), Japanese voice actor
- Kinoarashi Kazutoshi (騏ノ嵐 和敏; born 1961), Japanese sumo wrestler
- Kazutoshi Mori (森 和俊; born 1958), Japanese molecular biologist
- Kazutoshi Nagahama (長浜 一年; born 1969), Japanese cross-country skier
- Kazutoshi Sakurai (桜井 和寿; born 1970), Japanese musician
- Kazutoshi Sasayama (笹山 幸俊; 1924–2011), Japanese politician
- Kazutoshi Satō (佐藤 和俊; born 1978), Japanese shogi player
- Kazutoshi Wadakura (和田倉 和利; born 1959), Japanese film producer
