= Ashiya International Secondary School =

Coordinates: 34°43′27.6″N 135°19′7.2″E

- Ashiya, Hyogo; Japan

Information
- Type: public school
- Website: www.hyogo-c.ed.jp/~ashiyai-ss/index-e.html

Hyogo Prefectural Ashiya International Secondary School is a public, full-time, coeducational secondary school located in Hyogo prefect, Japan.

The students come from Australia, Austria, Brazil, Canada, China, Ecuador, Egypt, France, Germany, Iran, India, Italy, South Korea, North Korea, Mexico, New Zealand, Pakistan, Peru, the Philippines, Russia, Singapore, Switzerland, the Uk, the US, and Vietnam.
