= Harue Kitamura =

Japanese lawyer and politician (1928–2022)

- 北村 春江

Mayor of Ashiya
- In office 27 April 1991 – 10 June 2003
- Preceded by: Koroku Yamamura
- Succeeded by: Ken Yamanaka

Personal details
- Born: 11 July 1928 Kyoto, Japan
- Died: 13 March 2022 (aged 93) Nishinomiya, Hyōgo, Japan
- Party: Independent
- Education: Ritsumeikan University
- Occupation: Lawyer and politician
- Awards: Medal of Honor (Japan), Order of the Rising Sun

Harue Kitamura (Kitamura, Harue (北村 春江) 11 July 1928 – 13 March 2022) was a Japanese politician, lawyer, and feminist. She is the first woman to be elected mayor of a Japanese city, serving three terms as the mayor of Ashiya, Hyōgo.

== Early life ==
Kitamura was born in Kyoto in 1928. Raised in Osaka, in 1952 she graduated from Ritsumeikan University's law department. After experiencing gender discrimination in the workplace, Kitamura decided to become a lawyer to improve conditions and reduce inequality. She became the first Ritsumeikan alumna to pass the bar exam in 1956.

== Career ==
In 1959, Kitamura started working at the Osaka Family Court, then from 1979 until 1991, at the Ashiya Education Commission to chair terms.

Kitamura ran for mayor of Ashiya in 1991 as an independent, and became the first female mayor of a Japanese city. Her main supporters were mothers who supported her plans for public school reform. In 1992 Kitamura was presented with a Medal of Honor.

The Great Hanshin Earthquake occurred during her time in office, and 400 of Ashiya's citizens were killed. With transportation and official communications lines down, Kitamura had to call the mayors of Osaka, Beppu, and Izumo personally to ask for aid. Refugees stayed in city hall for weeks until housing was built.

In 2003 Kitamura retired from political life, and chose not to run for re-election. She was publicly recognized by the Governor of Hyōgo Prefecture, Toshizō Ido, for her work. Kitamura was awarded the Order of the Rising Sun, 3rd Class, Gold Rays with Neck Ribbon (旭日中綬章, Kyokujitsu chūjushō) in 2004.

== Personal life and death ==
Kitamura died from aspiration pneumonia in Nishinomiya on 13 March 2022, at the age of 93.

== Publications ==
- Kitamura, Harue (1986). "Kazoku no henyō to fujin-mondai". In Inui, Shōzō; Hatanaka, Kazuo; Yamashita, Kenji (eds.). Gendai nihon no kokka to hō. Kōza gendai nihon shakai no kōzō henka (A Course on the structural change of modern Japanese society) (in Japanese). Vol. 2. Tōkyō: Yūhikaku. ISBN 978-4-641-07172-8. OCLC 833222266. chapter title: "Family Transformation and Problems around Women" (「家族の変容と婦人問題」, "Kazoku no henyō to fujin-mondai")
- Kanehira, Teruko, ed. (1993). Danjo kyōdō shakai no sōzō [Creation of a society men and women collaborating]. 21-seiki no chihō jichi senryaku (in Japanese). Vol. 11. Kanehira, Teruko; Kitamura, Haruka; Tanaka, Masao; Ogino, Atsuko (panelists). Tōkyō: Gyōsei. ISBN 978-4-324-03605-1. OCLC 607133118. chapter title: "Panel discussion: Chief Executive Posts in Political Administration and Women" (「座談会 首長職と女性」, "Zadankai: Kubichō-shoku to josei")
- Committee on Equality of Both Sexes, Japan Bar Association, ed. (2007). "Dai 2-bu: dai 1-shō: 2-setsu 3; Bengoshi kara Ashiya shichō e no tenshin to hanshin-Awaji daishinsai". Josei bengoshi no ayumi: 3-nin kara 3000-nin e [History of a Female Lawyer: From 3 to 3000] (in Japanese). Akashi shoten. ISBN 978-4-7503-2511-8. chapter title: Part 2, Section 1, sub-section 2: 3 An attorney's path to the Mayor of Ashiya, and the Great Hanshin Awaji Earthquake (第2部: 第1章: 2節; 3 弁護士から芦屋市長への転身と阪神淡路大震災, Dai 2-bu: dai 1-shō: 2-setsu; 3 Bengoshi kara Ashiya shichō e no tenshin to Hanshin-Awaji daishinsai)
