= Takeshi Watanabe (civil servant) =

Japanese bureaucrat and banker (1906–2010)

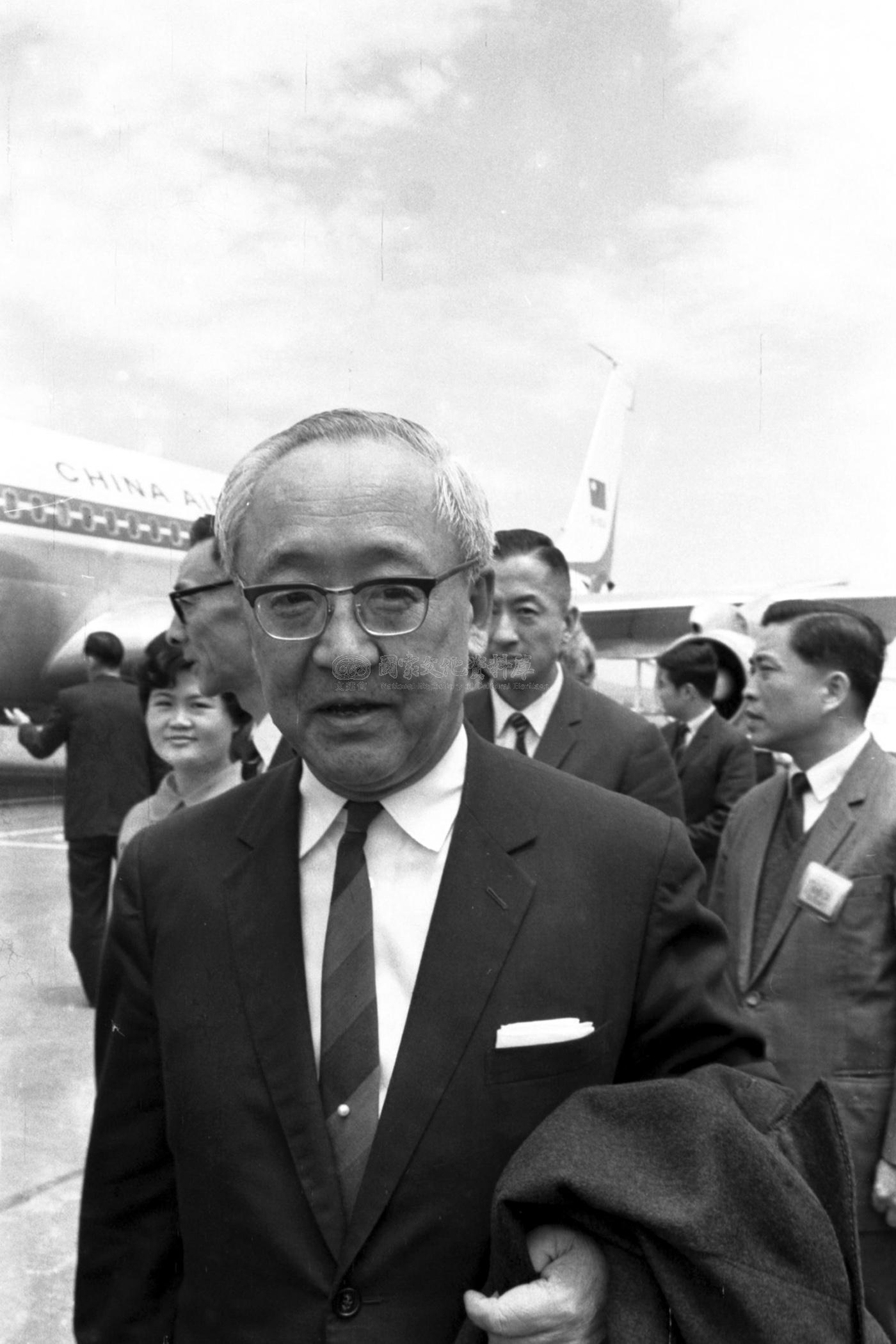
- Watanabe arriving in Taiwan (1970)
- Born: 15 February 1906; Japan
- Died: 23 August 2010 (aged 104); Tokyo, Japan
- Education: University of Tokyo
- Occupations: Bureaucrat, First President -Asian Development Bank

Viscount Takeshi Watanabe (渡辺 武, Watanabe Takeshi; 15 February 1906 – 23 August 2010) was a Japanese bureaucrat and the first President of the Asian Development Bank (ADB). He was in office from 24 November 1966 to 24 November 1972.

== Early life and education ==
Watanabe was born in Tokyo in 1906. His father was Chifuyu Watanabe, 2nd Viscount, and his grandfather was Chiaki Watanabe, 1st Earl, who served as the Minister of the Imperial Household. He was first educated at Gakushuin and then went on to study at the First Higher School. He graduated from the University of Tokyo with a degree in law in 1930.

== Career ==
Upon graduation, he started working for the Ministry of Finance, where one of his colleagues was Takeo Fukuda, who later became prime minister. Together with Hayato Ikeda, Minister of Finance, and Kiichi Miyazawa, his secretary—both of whom later became prime ministers—he played a central role in negotiating with the Allied Occupation Force about the economic policies and finances of occupied Japan.

Watanabe was considered to be the "father" of ADB, as it was under his leadership that many of ADB's policies and targets were established, the first bond was issued in the Federal Republic of Germany in 1969, and in September 1972, donors agreed to set up ADB's multilateral source of concessional lending, the Asian Development Fund. He served as President of ADB from its inception in 1966 to 1972.

After resigning from ADB, Watanabe took on a number of roles including advisor to the Bank of Tokyo, President of the Japan Credit Rating Agency (JCRA), and honorary chairman of Japan Silver Volunteers Inc. He was also the first Japanese chairman of the Trilateral Commission. His book of memoirs of ADB "Towards a New Asia" was published in 1973.

Watanabe Takeshi died in Tokyo on Monday 23 August 2010, at the age of 104.

Positions in intergovernmental organisations
New office	President of the Asian Development Bank; 1966–1972	Succeeded by Shiro Inoue
