= Yasushi Okada =

Japanese biologist

- 岡田康志
- Education: Nada High School
- Alma mater: University of Tokyo
- Website: https://www.okada-lab.phys.s.u-tokyo.ac.jp/en/about

Yasuji Okada (born 1968) is a Japanese molecular biologist and physician. He is a professor at the University of Tokyo. He is known for his research in single-molecule biology and bioimage informatics, notably discovering that kinesin can move as a single molecule. Collaborating with Olympus, he also developed a high-speed, high-resolution spinning disk super-resolution microscopy technique. He is the chief researcher at the University of Tokyo's International Research Centre for Neurointelligence, leading the Information Physics of Living Matters project. This project had already secured 1.15 billion yen (approximately US$10 million) of government research grant before it started.

== Career ==
Okada entered Nada Junior High School in 1981 and Nada High School in 1984. Commuting by train from his home in Osaka, he spent his travel time reading extensively. During his high school years, he read "Mechanics" by Landau and Lifshitz, part of the Course of Theoretical Physics series, and "The Feynman Lectures on Physics".

In 1987, Okada matriculated at the University of Tokyo. Facing a decision in his second year there between the Medical School and the Department of Biochemistry in the Faculty of Science (Shinfuri), he chose Medicine following advice from Yoshinori Ohsumi. He began his doctoral studies in 1993. He focused on single-molecule biology using specialised optical microscopy to visualise the physical movements of individual molecules. While the prevailing theory was that kinesin motor proteins worked like two-legged walking, Okada discovered cases where a single molecule could move independently. Okada's doctoral thesis was titled "The motility mechanism of the single-headed kinesin motor, KIF1A".

Around 2005, he and his graduate students discovered the role of Kinesin-2, cilia, and flagella in determining the left-right asymmetry of the heart, a condition referred to as situs inversus.

In 2015, in collaboration with Olympus Corporation, he developed a super-resolution fluorescence microscope with approximately 100 nanometers spatial resolution and 10 milliseconds temporal resolution, named "spinning disk super-resolution microscopy". This technique was noted for being a hundred times faster than existing super-resolution microscopy methods and achieved the world's fastest shutter speed.
