= Yodokō Guest House =

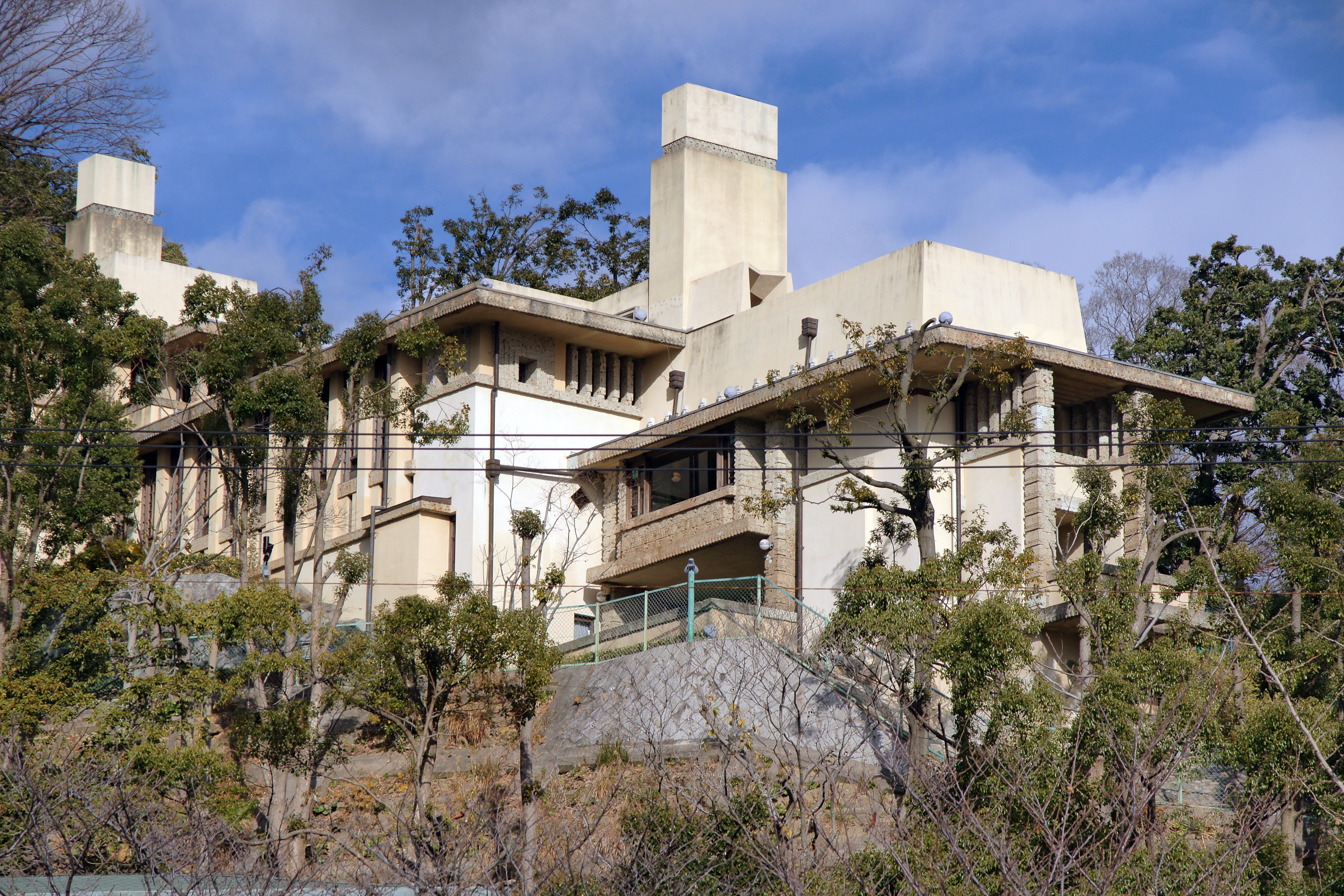

- Location within Japan

General information
- Type: House
- Location: Ashiya, Japan
- Coordinates: 34.739796°N 135.299935°E
- Construction started: 1924

Design and construction
- Architect: Frank Lloyd Wright

The Yodokō Guest House (ヨドコウ迎賓館, Yodokōgeihinkan) is a summer villa in Ashiya, Hyōgo, Japan. It was built for the well-to-do Japanese sake brewer of Sakura-Masamune, head of Tazaemon Yamamura, and is the only surviving Frank Lloyd Wright residence in Japan. The guest house was designed in 1918, and construction was completed in 1924.

Set into a hilltop in Ashiya, overlooking the Port of Kobe in Hyōgo Prefecture, western Japan, the villa demonstrates Wright's genius for spatial composition: although it has four levels, none is taller than two stories. By stepping the house into the hill, Wright took advantage of the extraordinary views of Osaka Bay the site offered. The exterior evokes Wright's Los Angeles textile block houses, but its decorative blocks are of Oya stone, not concrete.

In 1947, the house became the property of Yodogawa Steel Works, Ltd., and was used as an official residence for the company president. It was the first Taishō period building in Japan to be named an Important Cultural Property, in 1974. It was opened to the public as Yodokō Guest House in 1989. The building was damaged due to the Great Hanshin earthquake in 1995, but was subsequently repaired and has been re-opened.

== See also ==
- List of Frank Lloyd Wright works
