= Kizō Hisamoto =

Japanese politician

- 久元 喜造
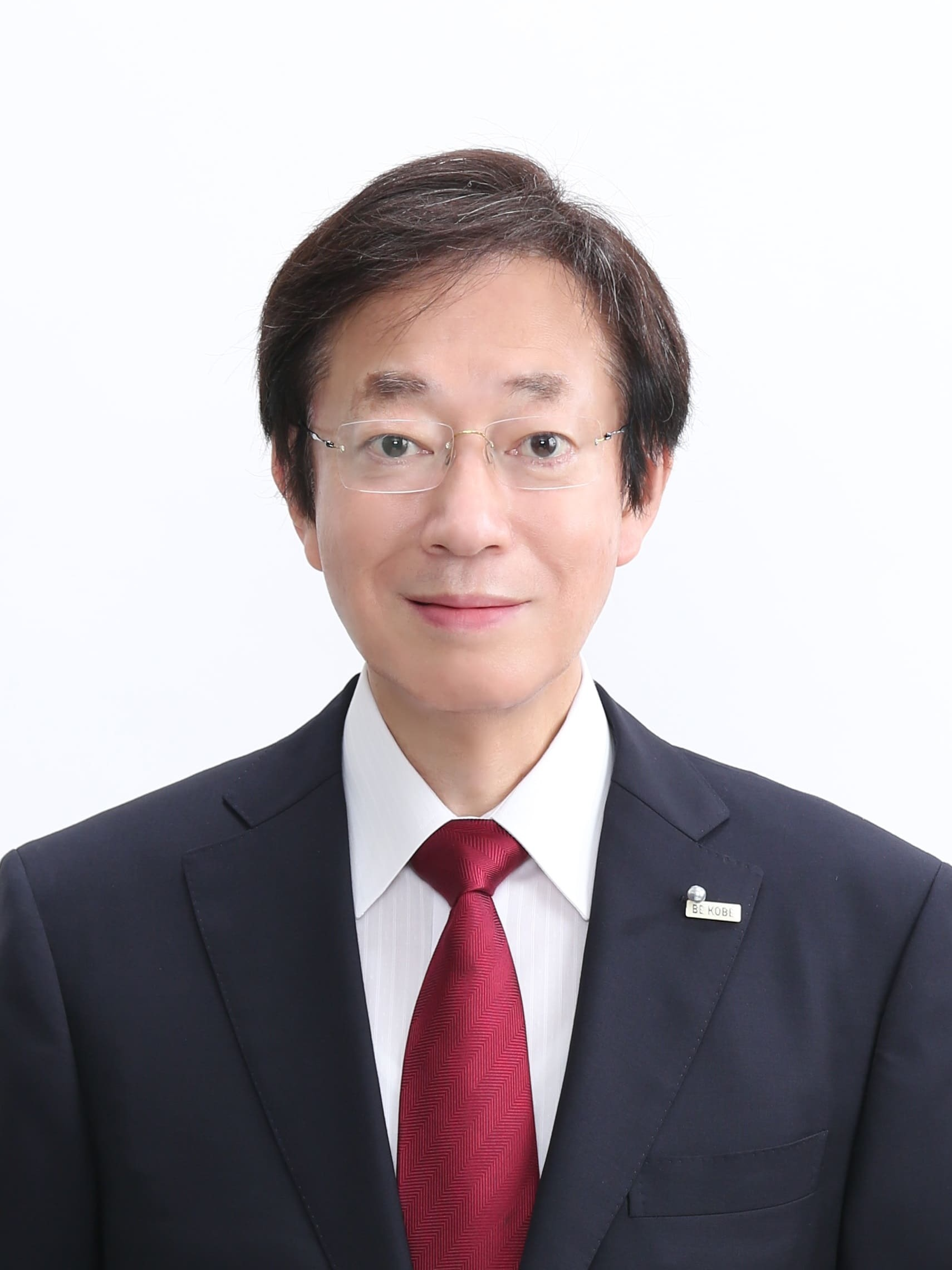

16th Mayor of Kobe
- Incumbent
- Assumed office 19 November 2013
- Preceded by: Tatsuo Yada

Personal details
- Born: 1 February 1954 (age 72) Hyōgo-ku, Kobe, Japan
- Party: Liberal Democratic
- Spouse: Yuko Hisamoto
- Education: University of Tokyo; Nada High School

Kizō Hisamoto (久元 喜造, Hisamoto Kizō) is a Japanese politician and the current mayor of Kobe, the capital city of Hyōgo Prefecture in Japan.
