= 2005 Kobe mayoral election =

Kobe held a mayoral election on October 23, 2005. Incumbent Tatsuo Yada backed by all parties except JCP won. Yada went on to serve as mayor for three terms, for a total of 12 years.

Mayoral election 2005: Kobe
Party	Candidate	Votes	%	±%
LDP, DPJ, NKP, SDP	Tatsuo Yada	198,661		
JCP	Keiko Seto	105,780		
Independent	Tsutomu Matsumura	56,903		
Turnout			30.23	−7.91
