= Mitsuo Sato =

Japanese government finance official (1933–2002)

Mitsuo Sato (佐藤 光夫, February 1, 1933 – October 20, 2002) was a Japanese government official who served as the 6th president of the Asian Development Bank (ADB). He also served as the vice president of the Tokyo Stock Exchange.

== Life ==
Sato was born in Gunma Prefecture, Japan. He graduated from Shibukawa High School and later from the Faculty of Law at the University of Tokyo. In 1955, he joined the Ministry of Finance. Between 1970 and 1973, he worked as an economist in the Fiscal Affairs Department of the International Monetary Fund (IMF), specialising in tax policy. Within the Ministry of Finance, he held several key positions, including Director of the Office of General Affairs in the Securities Bureau and Director of the Revenue Department at the Osaka Regional Taxation Bureau. In 1980, he became Director-General of the Fukuoka Regional Taxation Bureau and later served as Deputy Director-General of the International Finance Bureau. In 1986, Sato was appointed as an advisor to the Tokyo Stock Exchange, later becoming an Executive Managing Director, and in 1991, he was promoted to Vice President of the Exchange.

On 24 November 1993, Sato was appointed as the 6th president of the Asian Development Bank (ADB), a position he held until 15 January 1999. After stepping down from the ADB, he took on advisory roles, including serving as a special advisor to the Dai-ichi Life Research Institute. He also gave numerous lectures on his experiences, particularly in relation to the Asian financial crisis.
