= Ryōsuke Takashima =

Japanese politician

- 高島崚輔
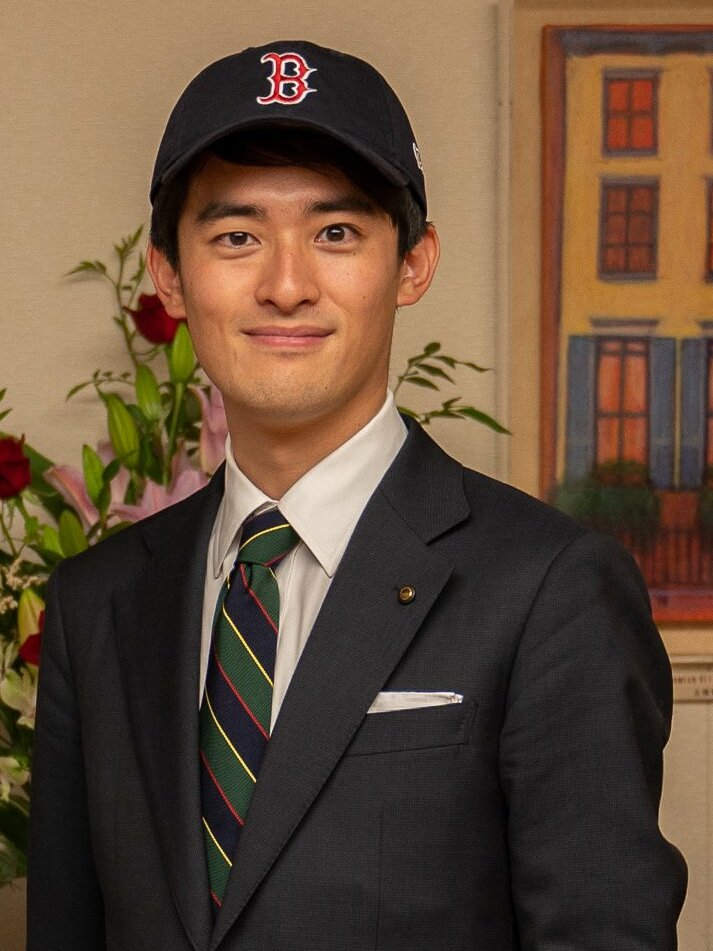
- Takashima in 2023

Mayor of Ashiya
- Incumbent
- Assumed office 11 May 2023
- Preceded by: Mai Ito

Personal details
- Born: 4 February 1997 (age 29) Minoh, Osaka Prefecture, Japan
- Party: Independent
- Website: www.takashimaryosuke.jp

Ryōsuke Takashima (Note: Japanese: 高島 崚輔、たかしま りょうすけ, officially 髙島 崚輔) (born 4 February 1997) is a Japanese politician who has served as mayor of Ashiya, Hyogo Prefecture since April 2023. He is known as the youngest elected mayor in Japan, being 26 years old at the time of the election on 23 April 2023.

== Early life and education ==
Ryōsuke Takashima was born in Minoh, Osaka Prefecture. He studied in Nada Junior and High School, serving there as the student council leader. Takashima passed both exams for University of Tokyo and Harvard University, but because he already completed the enrollment procedure at Tokyo, he spent 4 months studying in Tokyo before dropping out for Harvard. There he first studied public policy, but then switched to studying environmental energy engineering. In his first year, he visited the Tokyo Electric Power Company’s Fukushima Daiichi Nuclear Power Plant together with colleagues from the Kennedy School. Later in 2016 he became a chairman of the board of the non-profit organisation Global Learning Community Study Abroad Fellowship, officially dropping out of the Tokyo University in 2019. While receiving a scholarship from the Masayoshi Son Foundation and taking three gap years, he graduated from the Harvard John A. Paulson School of Engineering and Applied Sciences on 26 May 2022 with a Bachelor of Arts and Sciences degree. In the summer of the same year he moved to Ashiya.

=== Elections ===
On 14 April 2023 Takashima ran as an independent candidate in the Ashiya mayor elections, receiving 19,779 votes (46,66% of the total exit polls). Before Takashima's election, the youngest elected politician in Japan was Kesuke Ishida at 27 years old. In 2025, Takashima was selected for Time magazine’s "100 Next" list as "unconventional in Japan’s gerontocratic politics".

Candidate	Age	Party	Votes	%
Ryousuke Takashima	26	Independent	19,779	46.66
Mai Ito	53	Independent	11,981	28.26
Kaori Nakashima	55	Independent	5,671	13.37
Nobuo Otsuka	65	Independent	4,958	11.69

== Mayor of Ashiya ==
On 1 December 2023, the Ashiya City Council rejected Takashima’s proposal to appoint former superintendent of education of Saitama City Mayumi Hosoda as the successor to Toshiko Uetsuki on the board of education at a plenary session. The proposal failed to gain a majority vote, which was the first time that a personnel-related bill had been rejected in Ashiya since 1999. The Ashiya Board of Education consists of four members, who are appointed by the mayor with the consent of the council. As the previous superintendent of education, Uetsuki’s term was to end in December, Takashima recommended Hosoda as her successor. Hosoda had served as superintendent of education in Saitama City for five years from June 2018 and has also been a lecturer at the University of Tokyo Graduate School of Public Policy, with which Ashiya City concluded a partnership agreement in September of that year. In the plenary session, seven councillors from the LDP and Komeito parties voted in favour of the proposal, while ten councillors from the Japanese Communist Party, Nippon Ishin no Kai, Ashiya Citizens’ Future Party and independents voted against it; three members of the Sanseito abstained. In opposing speeches, four councillors cited reasons such as concerns that living far away would make it difficult to attend twice-monthly committee meetings and local events, and doubts over whether Ashiya’s education would be prioritised given its many other roles.
