= Asian Development Bank =

Regional development bank in Asia-Pacific

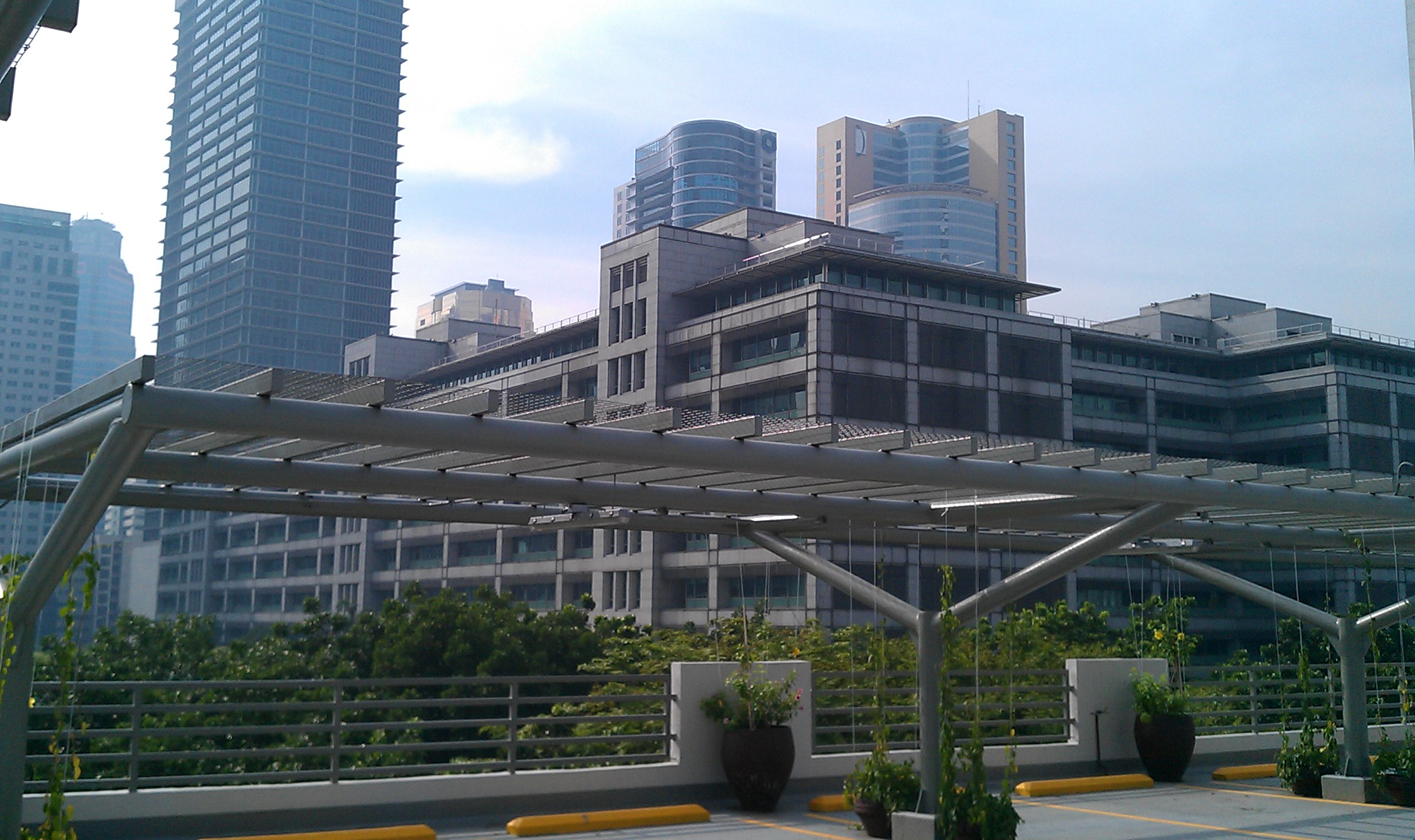
- Headquarters in 2011

- Nonregional members Regional members
- Abbreviation: ADB
- Formation: 19 December 1966; 59 years ago
- Type: Multilateral development bank
- Legal status: Treaty
- Purpose: Social and Economic Development
- Headquarters: 6 ADB Avenue, Barangay Wack-Wack Greenhills, Mandaluyong, Metro Manila 1550, Philippines
- Region served: Indo-Pacific
- Members: 69 countries
- President: Masato Kanda
- Main organ: Board of Governors
- Affiliations: International Monetary Fund (International)
- Staff: 3,769
- Website: adb.org

The Asian Development Bank (ADB) is a regional development bank to promote social and economic development in Asia. The bank is headquartered in the city of Mandaluyong, in Metro Manila, Philippines, and maintains 31 field offices around the world.

The bank was established on 19 December 1966 and admits the members of the UN Economic and Social Commission for Asia and the Pacific (UNESCAP, formerly the Economic Commission for Asia and the Far East or ECAFE), and non-regional developed countries. ADB’s membership reached 69 in September 2024.

The ADB was modeled closely on the World Bank and uses a weighted voting system, in which votes are distributed in proportion to members' capital subscriptions. ADB releases an annual report that summarizes its operations, budget, and other materials for review by the public. The ADB-Japan Scholarship Program (ADB-JSP) enrolls about 300 students annually in academic institutions located in 10 countries within the Region. After completing their study programs, scholars are expected to contribute to the economic and social development of their home countries. ADB holds the status of an official United Nations Observer.

As of 31 December 2020, Japan and the United States each holds the largest proportion of shares at 15.571%. China holds 6.429%, India holds 6.317%, and Australia holds 5.773%.

== Organization ==
The highest policymaking body of the bank is the Board of Governors, which is composed of one representative from each member state. The Board of Governors, in turn, elects twelve members of the Board of Directors and their alternates from among its members. The Asian Development Bank (ADB) distinguishes between regional members, located in the Asia-Pacific region, and nonregional members, primarily from Europe and North America. Regional members are the main beneficiaries of development projects, whereas nonregional members primarily contribute capital. Eight of the twelve directors represent regional members, while the remaining four represent nonregional members.

The Board of Governors also elect the bank's president, who is the chairperson of the board of directors and manages ADB. The president has a term of office lasting five years, and may be re-elected. Traditionally, and because Japan is one of the largest shareholders of the bank, the president has always been Japanese.

The current president is Masato Kanda. He succeeded Masatsugu Asakawa who in 2024, announced his resignation effective on 23 February 2025. Prior to that, Asakawa succeeded Takehiko Nakao on 17 January 2020, who succeeded Haruhiko Kuroda in 2013.

The headquarters of the bank is at 6 ADB Avenue, Mandaluyong, Metro Manila, Philippines, and it has 42 field offices in Asia and the Pacific and representative offices in Washington, Frankfurt, Tokyo and Sydney. The bank employs about 3,000 people, representing 60 of its 68 members.

=== List of presidents ===
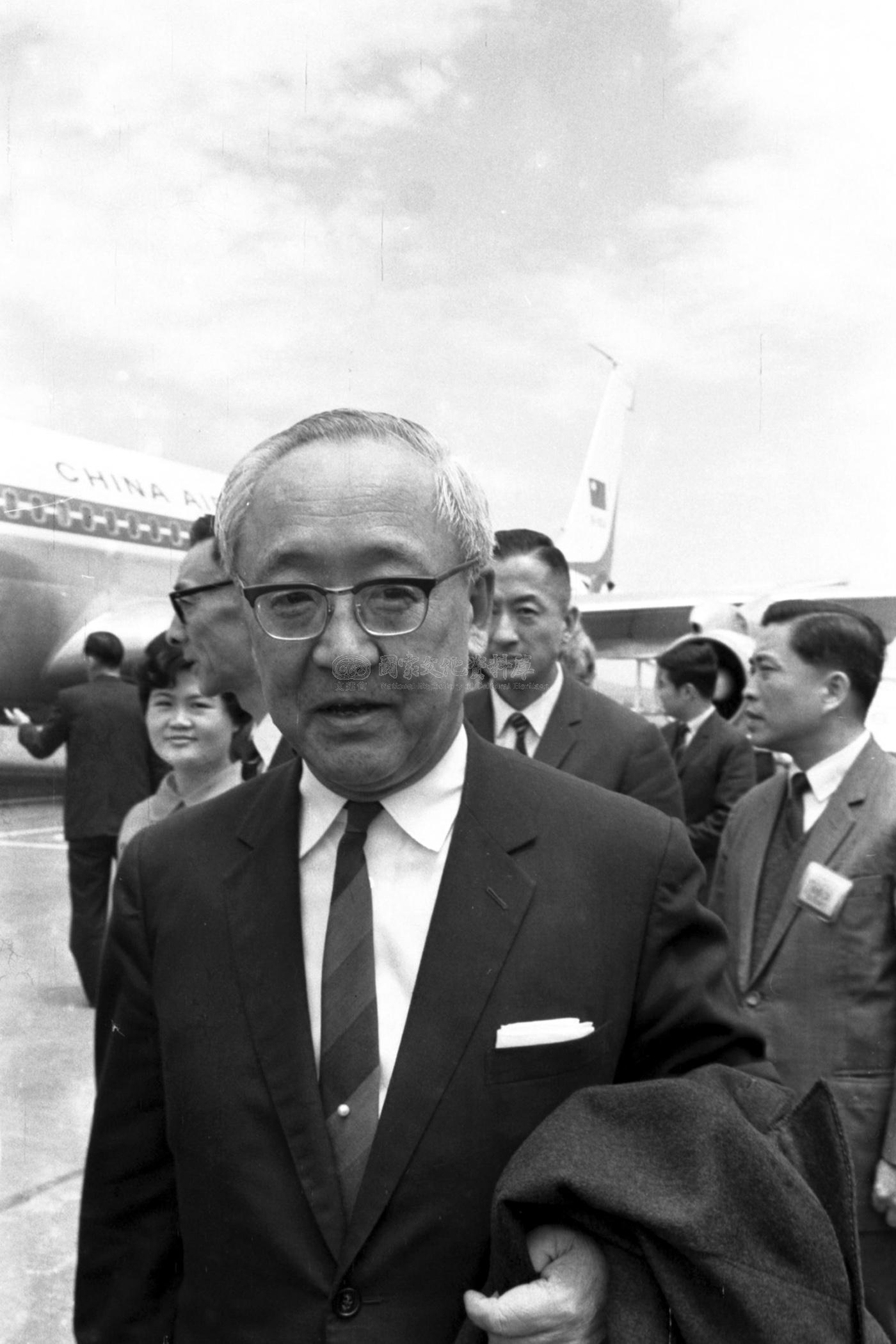
Takeshi Watanabe, the first president

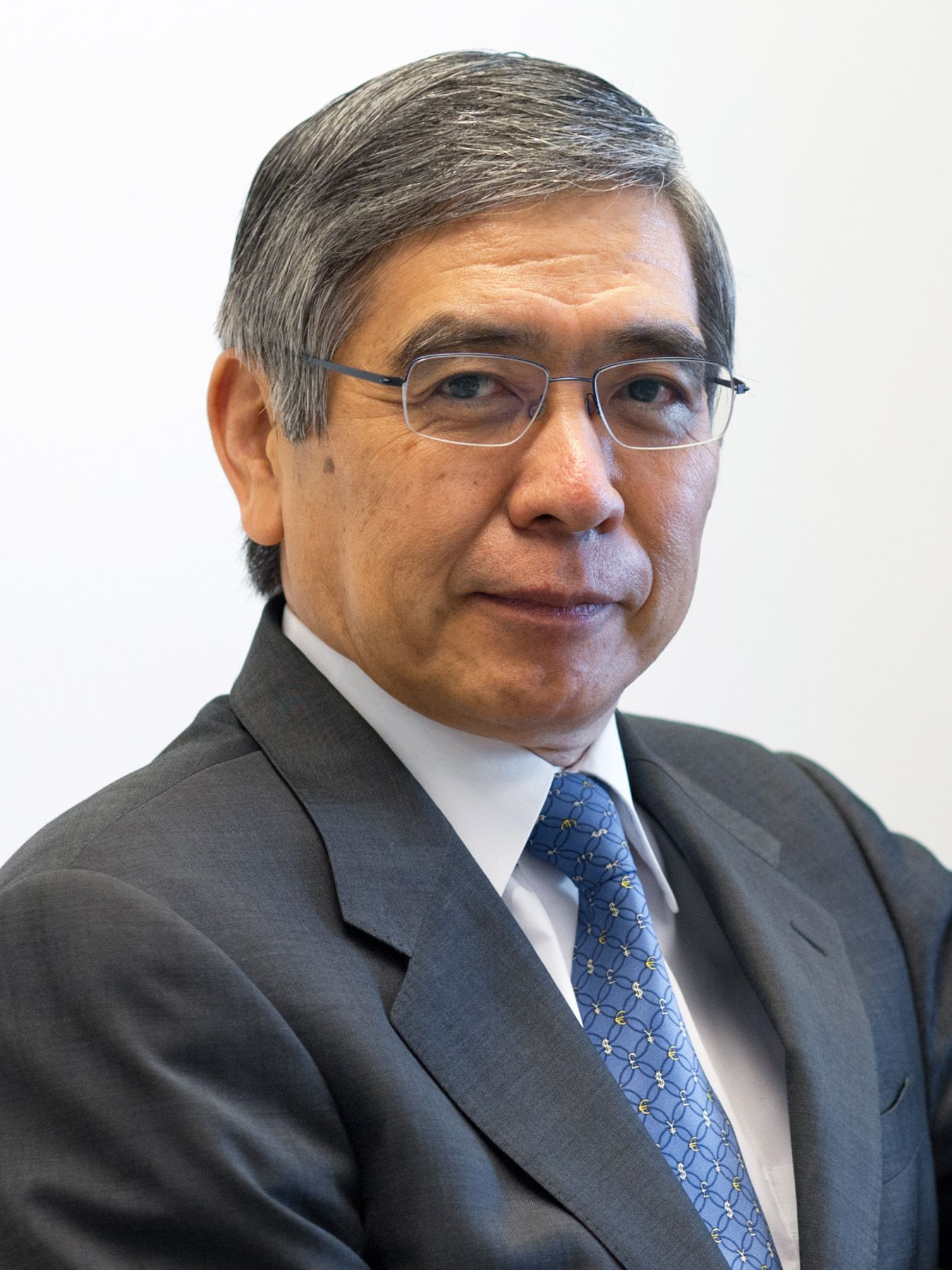
Haruhiko Kuroda, the eighth president

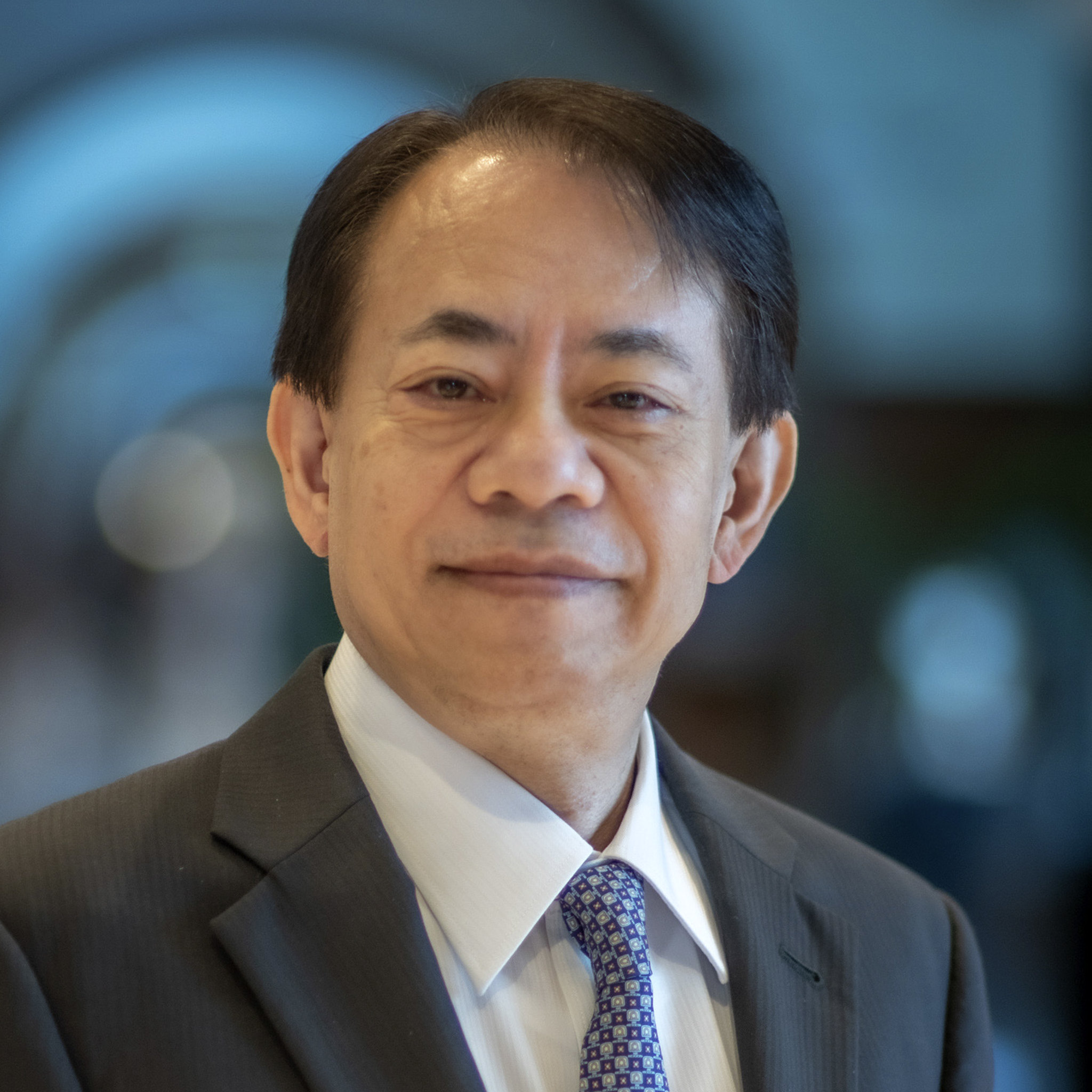
Masatsugu Asakawa, the tenth president

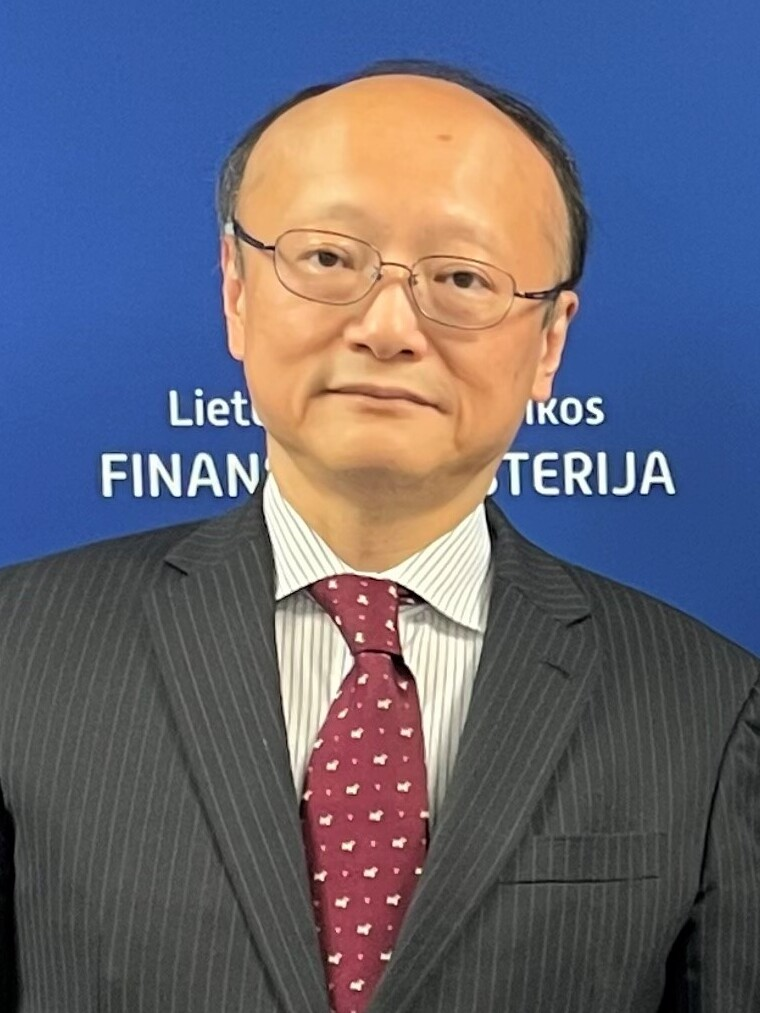
Masato Kanda, the eleventh president

Name	Dates	Nationality
Takeshi Watanabe	1966–1972	Japanese
Shiro Inoue	1972–1976	Japanese
Taroichi Yoshida	1976–1981	Japanese
Masao Fujioka	1981–1989	Japanese
Kimimasa Tarumizu	1989–1993	Japanese
Mitsuo Sato	1993–1999	Japanese
Tadao Chino	1999–2005	Japanese
Haruhiko Kuroda	2005–2013	Japanese
Takehiko Nakao	2013–2020	Japanese
Masatsugu Asakawa	2020–February 23, 2025	Japanese
Masato Kanda	February 24, 2025–	Japanese

== History ==
=== 1960s ===
As early as 1956, Japan Finance Minister Hisato Ichimada had suggested to United States Secretary of State John Foster Dulles that development projects in Southeast Asia could be supported by a new financial institution for the region. A year later, Japanese Prime Minister Nobusuke Kishi announced that Japan intended to sponsor the establishment of a regional development fund with resources largely from Japan and other industrial countries. But the US did not warm to the plan and the concept was shelved.

The idea came up again late in 1962 when Kaoru Ohashi, an economist from a research institute in Tokyo, visited Takeshi Watanabe, then a private financial consultant in Tokyo, and proposed a study group to form a development bank for the Asian region. The group met regularly in 1963, examining various scenarios for setting up a new institution and drew on Watanabe's experiences with the World Bank. However, the idea received a cool reception from the World Bank itself and the study group became discouraged.

In parallel, the concept was formally proposed at a trade conference organized by the Economic Commission for Asia and the Far East (ECAFE) in 1963 by a young Thai economist, Paul Sithi-Amnuai. (ESCAP, United Nations Publication March 2007, "The first parliament of Asia" pp. 65). Despite an initial mixed reaction, support for the establishment of a new bank soon grew.

An expert group was convened to study the idea, with Japan invited to contribute to the group. When Watanabe was recommended, the two streams proposing a new bank—from ECAFE and Japan—came together. Initially, the US was on the fence, not opposing the idea but not ready to commit financial support. But a new bank for Asia was soon seen to fit in with a broader program of assistance to Asia planned by United States President Lyndon B. Johnson in the wake of the escalating U.S. military support for the government of South Vietnam.

As a key player in the concept, Japan hoped that the ADB offices would be in Tokyo. However, eight other cities had also expressed an interest: Bangkok, Colombo, Kabul, Kuala Lumpur, Manila, Phnom Penh, Singapore, and Tehran. To decide, the 18 prospective regional members of the new bank held three rounds of votes at a ministerial conference in Manila in November/December 1965. In the first round on 30 November, Tokyo failed to win a majority, so a second ballot was held the next day at noon. Although Japan was in the lead, it was still inconclusive, so a final vote was held after lunch. In the third poll, Tokyo gained eight votes to Manila's nine, with one abstention. Therefore, Manila was declared the host of the new development bank; the Japanese were mystified and deeply disappointed. Watanabe later wrote in his personal history of ADB: "I felt as if the child I had so carefully reared had been taken away to a distant country." (Asian Development Bank publication, "Towards a New Asia", 1977, p. 16)

On 3 December 1965, Philippine President Diosdado Macapagal lays the foundation stone of the Asian Development Bank.

As intensive work took place during 1966 to prepare for the opening of the new bank in Manila, high on the agenda was choice of president. Japanese Prime Minister Eisaku Satō asked Watanabe to be a candidate. Although he initially declined, pressure came from other countries and Watanabe agreed. In the absence of any other candidates, Watanabe was elected first President of the Asian Development Bank at its Inaugural Meeting on 24 November 1966.

By the end of 1972, Japan had contributed $173.7 million (22.6% of the total) to the ordinary capital resources and $122.6 million (59.6% of the total) to the special funds. In contrast, the United States contributed only $1.25 million to the special fund.

After its creation in the 1960s, ADB focused much of its assistance on food production and rural development. At the time, Asia was one of the poorest regions in the world.

Early loans went largely to Indonesia, Thailand, Malaysia, South Korea and the Philippines; these countries accounted for 78.48% of the total ADB loans between 1967 and 1972. Moreover, Japan received tangible benefits, 41.67% of the total procurements between 1967 and 1976. Japan tied its special funds contributions to its preferred sectors and regions and procurements of its goods and services, as reflected in its $100 million donation for the Agricultural Special Fund in April 1968.

Watanabe served as the first ADB president to 1972.

=== 1970s–1980s ===
In the 1970s, ADB's assistance to developing countries in Asia expanded into education and health, and then to infrastructure and industry. The gradual emergence of Asian economies in the latter part of the decade spurred demand for better infrastructure to support economic growth. ADB focused on improving roads and providing electricity. When the world suffered its first oil price shock, ADB shifted more of its assistance to support energy projects, especially those promoting the development of domestic energy sources in member countries.

Following considerable pressure from the Reagan Administration in the 1980s, ADB reluctantly began working with the private sector in an attempt to increase the impact of its development assistance to poor countries in Asia and the Pacific. In the wake of the second oil crisis, ADB expanded its assistance to energy projects. In 1982, ADB opened its first field office, in Bangladesh, and later in the decade, it expanded its work with non-government organizations (NGOs).

Japanese presidents Inoue Shiro (1972–76) and Yoshida Taroichi (1976–81) took the spotlight in the 1970s. Fujioka Masao, the fourth president (1981–90), adopted an assertive leadership style, launching an ambitious plan to expand the ADB into a high-impact development agency.

On 18 November 1972, the Bank inaugurated its headquarters along Roxas Boulevard in Pasay City, Philippines. On 31 May 1991, ADB moved its offices to Ortigas Center in Mandaluyong City, with the Department of Foreign Affairs taking over its old Pasay premises.

=== 1990s ===
In the 1990s, ADB began promoting regional cooperation by helping the countries on the Mekong River to trade and work together. The decade also saw an expansion of ADB's membership with the addition of several Central Asian countries following the end of the Cold War.

In mid-1997, ADB responded to the financial crisis that hit the region with projects designed to strengthen financial sectors and create social safety nets for the poor. During the crisis, ADB approved its largest single loan – a $4 billion emergency loan to South Korea. In 1999, ADB adopted poverty reduction as its overarching goal.

=== 2000s ===
The early 2000s saw a dramatic expansion of private sector finance. While the institution had such operations since the 1980s (under pressure from the Reagan Administration) the early attempts were highly unsuccessful with low lending volumes, considerable losses and financial scandals associated with an entity named AFIC. However, beginning in 2002, the ADB undertook a dramatic expansion of private sector lending under a new team. Over the course of the next six years, the Private Sector Operations Department (PSOD) grew by a factor of 41 times the 2001 levels of new financings and earnings for the ADB. This culminated with the Board's formal recognition of these achievements in March 2008, when the board of directors formally adopted the Long Term strategic Framework (LTSF). That document formally stated that assistance to private sector development was the lead priority of the ADB and that it should constitute 50% of the bank's lending by 2020.

In 2003, the severe acute respiratory syndrome (SARS) epidemic hit the region and ADB responded with programs to help the countries in the region work together to address infectious diseases, including avian influenza and HIV/AIDS. ADB also responded to a multitude of natural disasters in the region, committing more than $850 million for recovery in areas of India, Indonesia, Maldives, and Sri Lanka which were impacted by the 2004 Indian Ocean earthquake and tsunami. In addition, $1 billion in loans and grants was provided to the victims of the October 2005 earthquake in Pakistan.

In December 2005, China donated $20 million to the ADB for a regional poverty alleviation fund; China's first such fund set up at an international institution.

In 2009, ADB's Board of Governors agreed to triple ADB's capital base from $55 billion to $165 billion, giving it much-needed resources to respond to the 2008 financial crisis. The 200% increase is the largest in ADB's history, and was the first since 1994.

=== 2010s ===
Asia moved beyond the economic crisis and by 2010 had emerged as a new engine of global economic growth though it remained home to two-thirds of the world's poor. In addition, the increasing prosperity of many people in the region created a widening income gap that left many people behind. ADB responded to this with loans and grants that encouraged economic growth.

In early 2012, the ADB began to re-engage with Myanmar in response to reforms initiated by the government. In April 2014, ADB opened an office in Myanmar and resumed making loans and grants to the country.

In 2017, ADB combined the lending operations of its Asian Development Fund (ADF) with its ordinary capital resources (OCR). The result was to expand the OCR balance sheet to permit increasing annual lending and grants to $20 billion by 2020 – 50% more than the previous level.

In 2020, ADB gave a $2 million grant from the Asia Pacific Disaster Response Fund, to support the Armenian government in the fight against the spread of COVID-19 pandemic. In the same year, the ADB committed a $20 million loan to Electric Networks of Armenia, that will ensure electricity for the citizens during the pandemic, as well as approved $500,000 in regional technical assistance to procure personal protective equipment and other medical supplies.

== Objectives and activities ==
=== Aim ===
The ADB defines itself as a social development organization that is dedicated to reducing poverty in Asia and the Pacific through inclusive economic growth, environmentally sustainable growth, and regional integration. This is carried out through investments – in the form of loans, grants and information sharing – in infrastructure, health care services, financial and public administration systems, helping countries prepare for the impact of climate change or better manage their natural resources, as well as other areas.

=== Focus areas ===
Eighty percent of ADB's lending is concentrated public sector lending in five operational areas.

- Education – Most developing countries in Asia and the Pacific have earned high marks for a dramatic rise in primary education enrollment rates in the last three decades, but daunting challenges remain, threatening economic and social growth.
- Environment, Climate Change, and Disaster Risk Management – Environmental sustainability is a prerequisite for economic growth and poverty reduction in Asia and the Pacific.
- Finance Sector Development – The financial system is the lifeline of a country's economy. It creates prosperity that can be shared throughout society and benefit the poorest and most vulnerable people. Financial sector and capital market development, including microfinance, small and medium-sized enterprises, and regulatory reforms, is vital to decreasing poverty in Asia and the Pacific. This has been a key priority of the Private Sector Operations Department (PSOD) since 2002. One of the most active sub-sectors of finance is the PSOD's support for trade finance. Each year the PSOD finances billions of dollars in letters of credit across all of Asia and the rest of the world.
- Infrastructure, including transport and communications, energy, water supply and sanitation, and urban development.
- Regional Cooperation and Integration – Regional cooperation and integration (RCI) was introduced by President Kuroda when he joined the ADB in 2004. It was seen as a long-standing priority of the Japanese government as a process by which national economies become more regionally connected. It plays a critical role in accelerating economic growth, reducing poverty and economic disparity, raising productivity and employment, and strengthening institutions.
- Private Sector Lending – This priority was introduced into the ADB's activities at the insistence of the Reagan Administration. However, that effort was never a true priority until the administration of President Tadeo Chino who in turn brought in a seasoned American banker – Robert Bestani. From then on, the Private Sector Operations Department (PSOD) grew at a very rapid pace, growing from the smallest financing unit of the ADB to the largest in terms of financing volume. As noted earlier, this culminated in the Long Term strategic Framework (LTSF) which was adopted by the Board in March 2008.

== Financings ==
The ADB offers "hard" loans on commercial terms primarily to middle income countries in Asia and "soft" loans with lower interest rates to poorer countries in the region. Based on a new policy, both types of loans will be sourced starting January 2017 from the bank's ordinary capital resources (OCR), which functions as its general operational fund.

The ADB's Private Sector Department (PSOD) can and does offer a broader range of financings beyond commercial loans. They also have the capability to provide guarantees, equity and mezzanine finance (a combination of debt and equity).

In 2017, ADB lent $19.1 billion of which $3.2 billion went to private enterprises, as part of its "non-sovereign" operations. ADB's operations in 2017, including grants and co-financing, totaled $28.9 billion.

ADB obtains its funding by issuing bonds on the world's capital markets. Moody's Investors Service assigned a credit rating of AAA to its senior unsecured debt as of April 2025. It also relies on the contributions of member countries, retained earnings from lending operations, and the repayment of loans.

Five largest borrowing countries
Country	2018		2017		2016		2015	
Country	$ million	%	$ million	%	$ million	%	$ million	%
China	17,015	16.6	16,284	16.9	15,615	24.8	14,646	25.2
India	16,115	15.7	14,720	15.2	13,331	21.2	12,916	22.2
Pakistan	10,818	10.6	10,975	11.4	4,570	7.3	4,319	7.4
Indonesia	10,356	10.1	9,393	9.7	8,700	13.8	8,214	14.1
Bangladesh	9,169	8.9	8,685	9.0	-	-	-	-
Philippines	-	-	-	-	5,935	9.4	5,525	9.5
Others	38,998	38.1	36,519	37.8	14,831	23.5	12,486	21.6
Total	102,470	100.0	96,577	100.0	62,983	100.0	58,106	100.0

== Private sector investments ==
ADB provides direct financial assistance, in the form of debt, equity and mezzanine finance to private sector companies, for projects that have clear social benefits beyond the financial rate of return. ADB's participation is usually limited but it leverages a large amount of funds from commercial sources to finance these projects by holding no more than 25% of any given transaction.

== Co-financing ==
ADB partners with other development organizations on some projects to increase the amount of funding available. In 2014, $9.2 billion—or nearly half—of ADB's $22.9 billion in operations were financed by other organizations. According to Jason Rush, Principal Communication Specialist, the Bank communicates with many other multilateral organizations.

== Funds and resources ==
More than 50 financing partnership facilities, trust funds, and other funds – totaling several billion each year – are administered by ADB and put toward projects that promote social and economic development in Asia and the Pacific. ADB has raised Rupees 5 billion or around Rupees 5 billion from its issuance of 5-year offshore Indian rupee (INR) linked bonds.

On 26 February 2020, ADB raises $118 million from rupee-linked bonds and supporting the development of India International Exchange in India, as it also contributes to an established yield curve which stretches from 2021 through 2030 with $1 billion of outstanding bonds.

=== 2022 Annual Report ===
The 2022 Annual Report details ADB's efforts in aiding its developing member countries to overcome the aftermath of the COVID-19 pandemic, tackle new challenges like the Russian invasion of Ukraine and a severe food crisis, while also addressing climate change with significant financial commitments, including $6.7 billion for climate initiatives and a $14 billion package for food security. The ADB committed a total of $20.5 billion in various forms of assistance, including private sector financing, and fostered regional cooperation, with a focus on gender equality, education, healthcare, and unlocking additional resources through innovative financial mechanisms. The report also notes organizational reforms for increased efficacy, the adoption of a hybrid work model following the full reopening of its headquarters.

== Access to information ==
ADB has an information disclosure policy that presumes all information that is produced by the institution should be disclosed to the public unless there is a specific reason to keep it confidential. The policy calls for accountability and transparency in operations and the timely response to requests for information and documents. ADB does not disclose information that jeopardizes personal privacy, safety and security, certain financial and commercial information, as well as other exceptions.

== Notable projects and technical assistance ==
- Afghanistan: Hairatan to Mazar-e-Sharif Railway Project
- Armenia: Water Supply and Sanitation Sector Project
- Bhutan: Green Power Development Project
- India: Rural Roads Sector II Investment Program; Agartala Municipal Infrastructure Development Project
- Indonesia: Vocational Education Strengthening Project, Jakarta MRT Phase III
- Laos: Northern and Central Regions Water Supply and Sanitation Sector Project
- Mongolia: Food and Nutrition Social Welfare Program and Project
- Philippines: North–South Commuter Railway Extension Project (Malolos–Clark Railway Project and South Commuter Railway Project), jointly funded with Japan International Cooperation Agency; MRT Line 4; Bataan–Cavite Interlink Bridge, jointly funded by Asian Infrastructure Investment Bank; Laguna Lakeshore Road Network, jointly funded by Asian Infrastructure Investment Bank and Export-Import Bank of Korea-Economic Development Cooperation Fund
- Solomon Islands: Pacific Private Sector Development Initiative

== Criticism ==
Since the ADB's early days, critics have charged that the two major donors, Japan and the United States, have had extensive influence over lending, policy and staffing decisions.

Oxfam Australia has criticized the Asian Development Bank for insensitivity to local communities. "Operating at a global and international level, these banks can undermine people's human rights through projects that have detrimental outcomes for poor and marginalized communities." The bank also received criticism from the United Nations Environmental Program, stating in a report that "much of the growth has bypassed more than 70 percent of its rural population, many of whom are directly dependent on natural resources for livelihoods and incomes."

There had been criticism that ADB's large scale projects cause social and environmental damage due to lack of oversight. One of the most controversial ADB-related projects is Thailand's Mae Moh coal-fired power station. Environmental and human rights activists say ADB's environmental safeguards policy as well as policies for indigenous peoples and involuntary resettlement, while usually up to international standards on paper, are often ignored in practice, are too vague or weak to be effective, or are simply not enforced by bank officials.

The bank has been criticized over its role and relevance in the food crisis. The ADB has been accused by civil society of ignoring warnings leading up the crisis and also contributing to it by pushing loan conditions that many say unfairly pressure governments to deregulate and privatize agriculture, leading to problems such as the rice supply shortage in Southeast Asia.

Indeed, whereas the Private Sector Operations Department (PSOD) closed out that year with financings of $2.4 billion, the ADB has significantly dropped below that level in the years since and is clearly not on the path to achieving its stated goal of 50% of financings to the private sector by 2020. Critics also point out that the PSOD is the only department that actually makes money for the ADB. Hence, with the vast majority of loans going to concessionary (sub-market) loans to the public sector, the ADB is facing considerable financial difficulty and continuous operating losses.

== Countries with the largest subscribed capital and voting rights ==
The following table are amounts for 20 largest countries by subscribed capital and voting power at the Asian Development Bank as of December 2021.

The 20 countries with the largest capital contribution and voting rights in the Asian Development Bank
Rank	Country	Subscribed capital (% of total)	Voting power (% of total)
	World	100.000	100.000
1	Japan	15.571	12.751
1	United States	15.571	12.751
3	China	6.429	5.437
4	India	6.317	5.347
5	Australia	5.773	4.913
6	Indonesia	5.434	4.641
7	Canada	5.219	4.469
8	South Korea	5.026	4.315
9	Germany	4.316	3.747
10	Malaysia	2.717	2.468
11	Philippines	2.377	2.196
12	France	2.322	2.152
13	Pakistan	2.174	2.033
14	United Kingdom	2.038	1.924
15	Italy	1.803	1.737
16	New Zealand	1.532	1.520
17	Thailand	1.358	1.381
18	Taiwan	1.087	1.164
19	Netherlands	1.023	1.113
20	Bangladesh	1.019	1.109
	All Remaining Members	10.894	22.832

== Members ==
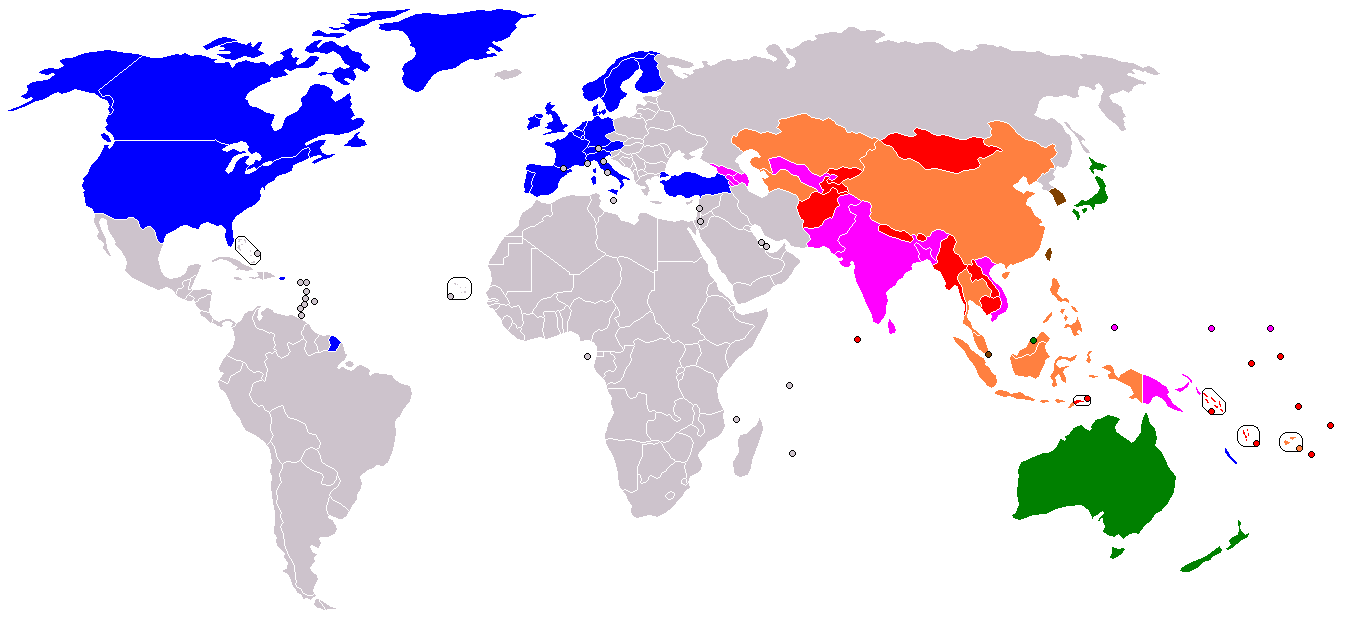
Asian Development Bank – Developing Member Countries (DMC) graduation stages Outside regions Asia-Pacific region developed members DMC graduated from assistance, Group-D Ordinary Capital Resources (OCR) financing, Group-C OCR and ADF blended financing, Group-B Asian Development Fund (ADF) financing, Group-A

ADB has 69 members (as of 27 September 2024): 50 members from the Asian and Pacific Region, and 18 members from Other Regions. The year listed after a member's name indicates the year of their membership. When a country no longer remains a member, the Bank shall arrange for the repurchase of such country's shares by the Bank as a part of the settlement of accounts with such country in accordance with the provisions of paragraphs 3 and 4 of Article 43.

Regional members	Date of accession
Afghanistan	1966
Australia	1966
Cambodia	1966
India	1966
Indonesia	1966
Japan	1966
Laos	1966
Malaysia	1966
Nepal	1966
New Zealand	1966
Pakistan	1966
Philippines	1966
Samoa	1966
Singapore	1966
South Korea	1966
Sri Lanka	1966
Taiwan	1966
Thailand	1966
Vietnam	1966
Hong Kong	1969
Fiji	1970
Papua New Guinea	1971
Tonga	1972
Burma	1973
Solomon Islands	1973
Kiribati	1974
Cook Islands	1976
Maldives	1978
Vanuatu	1981
Bangladesh	1973
Bhutan	1982
China	1986
Federated States of Micronesia	1990
Marshall Islands	1990
Mongolia	1991
Nauru	1991
Turkey	1991
Tuvalu	1993
Kazakhstan	1994
Kyrgyzstan	1994
Uzbekistan	1995
Tajikistan	1998
Azerbaijan	1999
Turkmenistan	2000
Timor-Leste	2002
Palau	2003
Armenia	2005
Brunei Darussalam	2006
Georgia	2007
Niue	2019

Nonregional members	Date of accession
Austria	1966
Belgium	1966
Canada	1966
Denmark	1966
Finland	1966
Germany	1966
Italy	1966
Netherlands	1966
Norway	1966
Sweden	1966
United Kingdom	1966
United States	1966
Switzerland	1967
France	1970
Spain	1986
Portugal	2002
Luxembourg	2003
Ireland	2006
Israel	2024

== See also ==
- African Development Bank
- Asian Clearing Union
- Asian Development Bank Institute (ADBI)
- Asian Infrastructure Investment Bank (AIIB)
- Asia Cooperation Dialogue
- Asia Council
- CAF – Development Bank of Latin America and the Caribbean
- Caribbean Development Bank
- Eurasian Development Bank
- Inter-American Development Bank
- International Monetary Fund
- South Asia Subregional Economic Cooperation
- World Bank
