= Masato Kanda =

Japanese bureaucrat

- 神田 眞人
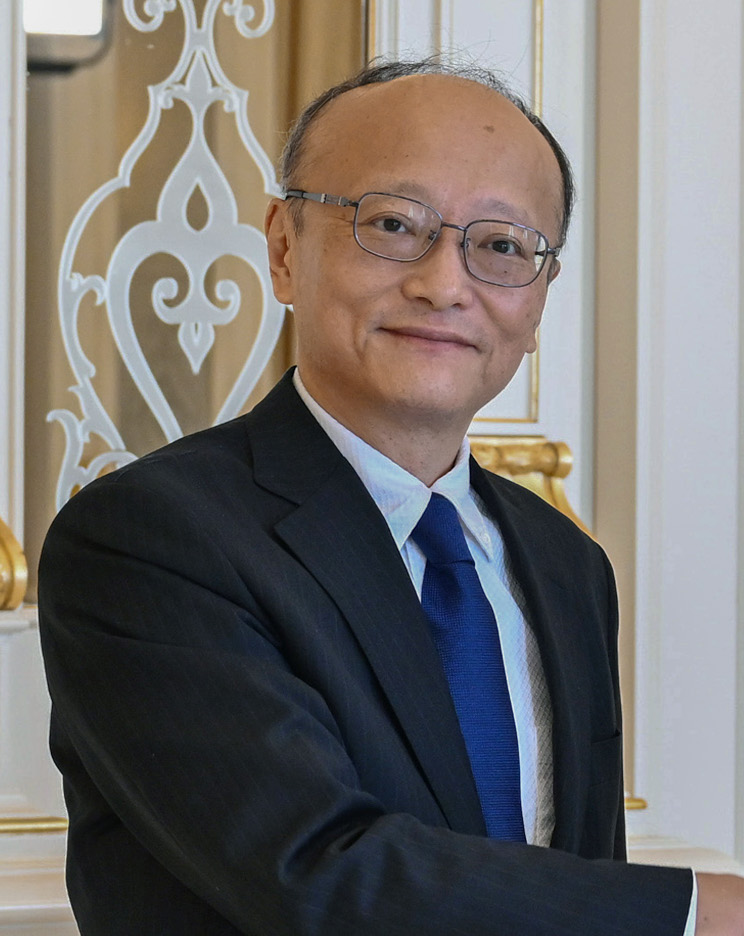
- Kanda in 2025

President of the Asian Development Bank
- Incumbent
- Assumed office 24 February 2025
- Preceded by: Masatsugu Asakawa

Personal details
- Born: 17 January 1965 (age 61) Nishinomiya, Hyogo, Japan
- Education: University of Tokyo (BA); Oxford University (MPhil)

Masato Kanda (神田 眞人, Kanda Masato; born 17 January 1965) is a Japanese bureaucrat who is president of the Asian Development Bank since 2025. He was previously a senior official at the Ministry of Finance, serving as Vice Minister of Finance for International Affairs (財務官, zaimukan), the country's top currency diplomat. In that position, he carried out Japan's first yen-buying intervention in 24 years.

== Biography ==
He was born in Nishinomiya, Hyogo, on 17 January 1965. He attended Nada High School in Kobe, then went on to study law at the University of Tokyo. At the university, he learnt international politics from Yōichi Masuzoe, later Governor of Tokyo. After graduation, he started working for the Ministry of Finance. From 1989, he studied economics at Oxford University, from which he graduated with an MPhil. He served as alternate executive director at the World Bank from 2006 to 2009.

As a senior official, Kanda successively served as deputy commissioner of the Financial Services Agency, deputy chief of the Budget Bureau, director for policy planning and chief of the International Bureau. He was appointed Vice Minister of Finance for International Affairs in 2021. In 2022, he carried out the first yen-buying intervention in 24 years. Due to the yen being traded in the weakest range in the past three decades during his tenure, his remarks on the possibility of currency intervention often make news headlines, in which he is sometimes referred to as the country's 'FX Tsar'.

Alongside his bureaucratic positions, he served as chairman of the OECD Corporate Governance Committee from 2016 to 2024, overseeing an revision of corporate governance principles in 2023. He left his position as vice minister in 2024 and was appointed adviser to the cabinet and the ministry of finance.

In November 2024, Kanda was elected the president of the Asian Development Bank to finish the retiring Masatsugu Asakawa's term. He assumed office on 24 February 2025. Kanda presided over a amendment to the bank charter, allowing an increase in financing. In 2025, the ABD provided record financial support to its members. In September 2026 he was reelected for a five-year term starting in November 2026. That same month, Kanda signed a memorandum with Kao Kim Hourn, Secretary-General of ASEAN, pledging $30 billion for development.
