= Takehiko Nakao =

Japanese civil servant

- 中尾 武彦
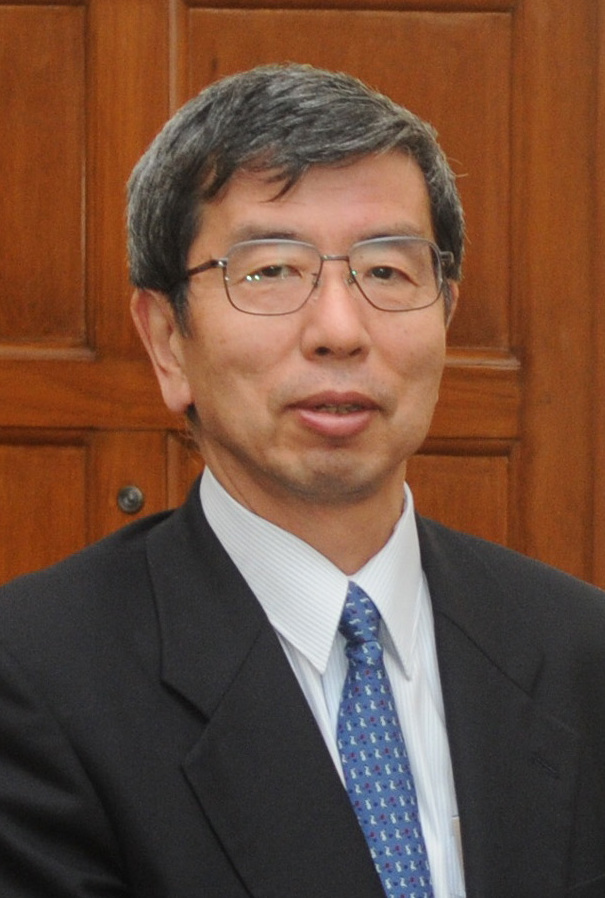
- Nakao in 2015

9th President of the Asian Development Bank
- In office 28 April 2013 – 16 January 2020
- Preceded by: Haruhiko Kuroda
- Succeeded by: Masatsugu Asakawa

Personal details
- Born: March 5, 1956 (age 70) Hyōgo Prefecture, Japan
- Spouse: Asako
- Children: Yosuke, Ryuta
- Education: University of Tokyo; University of California, Berkeley
- Occupation: Civil servant

Takehiko Nakao (中尾 武彦, Nakao Takehiko; born 5 March 1956) is a Japanese former civil servant who served as the ninth president of the Asian Development Bank between 2013 and early 2020. He is Adviser, Sumitomo Corporation and Chairman, Center for International Economy and Strategy. He is also a board member (external) of the Daiichi Life Insurance Ltd. He teaches international economic policies and development economics as visiting professor at the Graduate School of Public Policy at Tokyo University and National Graduate Institute for Policy Studies (Tokyo).

== Career ==
Nakao was a career civil servant with the Finance Ministry of Japan which he joined in 1978. During his career, Nakao served variously as Minister at the Embassy of Japan in Washington D.C. and as an economic advisor at the International Monetary Fund in the mid-1990s. Before his nomination for the presidency of the Asian Development Bank (ADB), Nakao was Vice Minister of Finance for International Affairs, which is the senior most civil service appointment within Japan's Finance Ministry. As Japan's top currency official, Nakao oversaw the Japanese government's largest ever currency market intervention following the sharp appreciation of the yen in 2011. He was also the Japanese finance deputy at the G7 and G20 summits and finance ministers & central bank governors meetings in 2011-13.

== Education ==
Nakao holds a degree in economics from the University of Tokyo where he later taught international finance during 2010–2011. He also holds an MBA degree from the University of California, Berkeley. In 2008, he authored the book America’s Economic Policy: Can it Sustain its Strength?.

== President of the ADB ==
Nakao was nominated by Japan to be president of the ADB, succeeding his compatriot Haruhiko Kuroda, who resigned in March 2013 to become the governor of the Bank of Japan. Since its inception in 1966, ADB presidents have all been Japanese and although there was talk of a Chinese challenge, Nakao remained the sole nominee for the post. He was unanimously elected president by the Board of Governors of the ADB and assumed office on 28 April 2013. In August 2016, the ADB Board appointed Nakao to a new five-year term, which began on 24 November 2016.

As ADB President, Nakao identified securing financial resources for the ADB and promoting public-private partnerships as focus areas and called for a “more innovative, more inclusive and more integrated” development of the Asia-Pacific region. During his period as president, the ADB continued its focus on infrastructure, environment, regional integration, inclusiveness and gender equality, cofinancing initiatives and internal reforms to overcome the ADB's resource crunch and to streamline its performance.

In January 2020, Philippines president Rodrigo Duterte awarded Nakao the Order of Sikatuna, the Philippines' highest civilian recognition, with the rank of Grand Cross, or Datu, in recognition of his services to the Philippines in supporting the national development program during his period as president of ADB.

== Bibliography ==
Books (English)

- Asia’s Journey to Prosperity -Policy, Market and Technology over 50 Years, January 2020, Asian Development Bank (Lead Editor and Co-author with Staff) https://www.adb.org/publications/asias-journey-to-prosperity
- The Rise of Asia: Perspectives and Beyond -Memoir of the President of the Asian Development Bank (2013-2020), July 2022, Asian Development Bank https://www.adb.org/sites/default/files/publication/808451/rise-asia-perspectives-beyond.pdf

Papers (English)

- ADB’s New Strategy in Asia, Helping Build Quality Infrastructure at Scale, September 2016, International Development Journal (translation)
- Challenges in International Finance and Japan’s Responses, March 15, 2012, International Financial Symposium hosted by the Institute for International Monetary Affairs
- Response to the Global Financial Crisis and Future Policy Challenges, Hakone, October 23, 2010, Keynote Address, Symposium co-hosted by Harvard Law School and International House of Japan
- Reforming the International Monetary System—Japan’s Perspective, March 18, 2010, Symposium at the Institute for International Monetary Affairs
- Japanese ODA—Adapting to the Issues and Challenges of the New Aid Environment, October 2005, FASID Discussion Paper on Development Assistance No.8, with Takamasa Akiyama
- Japan’s Experience with Fiscal Policy in the 1990s, March 2002, Paper for the Seminar on Fiscal Impacts Hosted by the Central Bank of Italy

Positions in intergovernmental organisations
| Preceded by Haruhiko Kuroda | President of the Asian Development Bank; 2013–2020 | Succeeded by Masatsugu Asakawa |
