= Masatsugu Asakawa =

Japanese civil servant

- 浅川 雅嗣
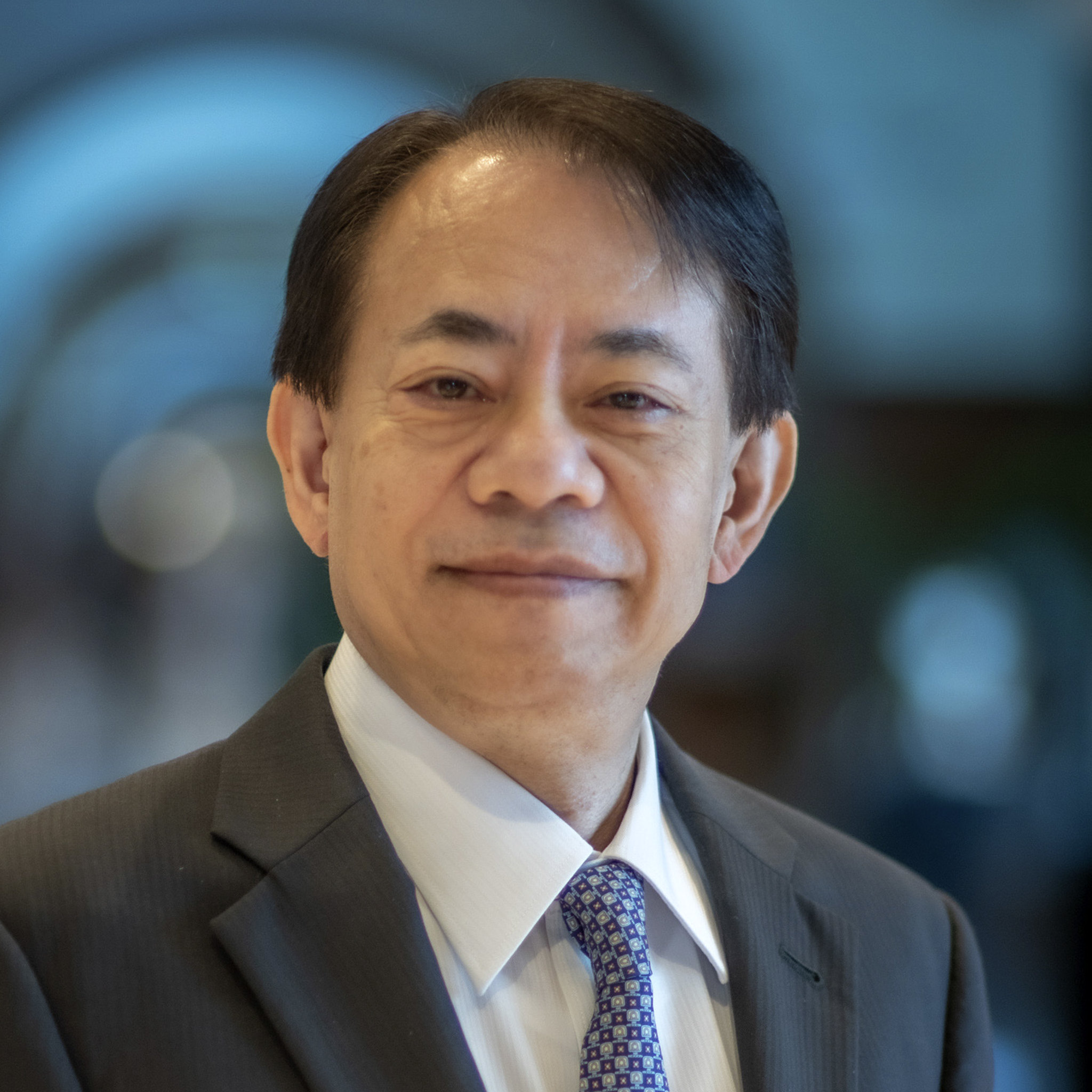
- Masatsugu in 2022

10th President of the Asian Development Bank
- In office 17 January 2020 – 24 February 2025
- Preceded by: Takehiko Nakao
- Succeeded by: Masato Kanda

Personal details
- Born: 25 January 1958 (age 67) Shizuoka, Japan
- Education: University of Tokyo (BA); Princeton University (MPA)

Masatsugu Asakawa (浅川 雅嗣, Asakawa Masatsugu; born 25 January 1958), a Japanese civil servant, was the president of the Asian Development Bank (ADB). Asakawa, who took office on 17 January 2020, was the 10th president of ADB. He was formerly special adviser to Shinzo Abe, prime minister of Japan, and to Taro Aso, the deputy prime minister of Japan and minister of finance. He was also formerly the vice minister for international affairs in the Ministry of Finance in Japan.

== Early life ==
Born in the Shizuoka Prefecture of Japan, Asakawa attended Faculty of Economics, University of Tokyo, graduating with a BA in 1981. He joined the Ministry of Finance in Japan the same year. Asakawa later studied at the Woodrow Wilson School of Public and International Affairs at Princeton University in the United States, graduating with an MPA in 1985.

== Work with government ==
A brief summary of Masatsugu Asakawa's career in the Ministry of Finance in Japan is as follows:

- 2000–2002: Regional Financial Cooperation Division, International Bureau
- 2002–2004: International Tax Policy Division, Tax Bureau
- 2004–2006: Foreign Exchange Markets Division
- 2006–2007: Development Policy Division
- 2007–2008: Director for Co-ordination Division, International Bureau
- 2009–2013: Deputy Vice Minister for International Affairs
- 2012–2013: Senior Deputy Director-General, International Bureau and Executive Assistant to Deputy Prime Minister and Finance Minister, Ministry of Finance
- 2013–2014: Deputy Vice Minister for Policy Planning and Co-ordination
- 2014–2015: Director-General of the International Bureau
- 2015–2019: Vice Minister for International Affairs with responsibilities for all international policies of the Japanese Ministry of Finance including G20/IMF issues, foreign exchange rate policy, and development assistance.

== President of Asian Development Bank ==
On 2 December 2019, it was announced that Asakawa had been unanimously elected by Board of Governors of Asian Development Bank (ADB) as the 10th president of the Bank. The Government of Japan nominated Asakawa as a candidate for position of president ADB in September 2019. The former ADB president, Takehiko Nakao, announced that he would retire as ADB president on 16 January 2020 so Asakawa took up his position as ADB president on 17 January 2020. In the first instance, Asakawa was expected to serve out the remainder of the five-term presidential term which Nakao began in November 2016. After he took over, ADB made significant contributions to the regional response to the COVID-19 pandemic by providing a $20 million package and a $9 billion Asia Pacific Vaccine Facility.

The regular five-year election for the position of ADB president was held as scheduled in mid-2021. Asakawa was the only candidate and received unanimous support for a five-year term beginning on 24 November 2021.

In 2024, Asakawa announced his resignation effective on 23 February 2025.

== Other positions ==
Between 1989 and 1992 Asakawa was seconded by the Japanese Ministry of Finance to serve as an Executive Assistance to the fifth president of the Asian Development Bank, Kimimasa Tarumizu, in Manila.

Asakawa has also worked in various positions in other international agencies. Between 1999 and 2000 he served as head of the Technical Assistance Management Unit in the Fiscal Affairs Department of the International Monetary Fund. He has also held several positions at the Committee on Fiscal Affairs, OECD while concurrently serving in his duties at the Ministry of Finance including:

- 2002–2004: Co-Chair for Board for Co-operation with Non-OECD Economies
- 2002–2004: Co-Chair for Forum on Harmful Tax Practices
- 2011–2016: Chair for Committee on Fiscal Affairs.

Asakawa also served as executive assistant to the prime minister during the period of the Aso Cabinet (2008–2009).

He served as visiting professor at the Graduate School of Economic Science, Saitama University in Tokyo from 2006 to 2009, and at the Graduate School of Arts and Sciences, University of Tokyo from 2012 to 2015.

Positions in intergovernmental organisations
Preceded by Takehiko Nakao	President of the Asian Development Bank; 2020–present	Incumbent
