= Yoshiaki Murakami =

Japanese investor

- Born: August 11, 1959 (age 66); Osaka, Japan
- Education: Nada High School
- Alma mater: University of Tokyo (Bachelor of Laws)
- Occupations: Investor, Bull, bureaucrat
- Known for: Murakami Fund (村上ファンド))

Yoshiaki Murakami (村上 世彰, Murakami Yoshiaki; born August 11, 1959) is a Japanese investor, bull, former bureaucrat of the MITI, co-founder of "Murakami Fund" (Japanese: 村上ファンド), and founder of the Murakami Family Foundation (村上財団).

== Career ==
Murakami was born in Osaka. His first investment was made when he was 10 years old, after his father gave him 1 million yen and directed him to spend the money how he wished, which he decided to invest in a brewery. After graduating from the University of Tokyo, he joined the Ministry of International Trade and Industry (the current Ministry of Economy, Trade and Industry), where he worked for 16 years, with a focus on mergers and acquisitions. After leaving his role, in 1999 he established MAC Asset Management, known as the Murakami Fund, before the age of 40.

He gained attention as a “vocal shareholder” and shareholder activist, by obtaining shares in publicly traded companies that fail to optimize their cash reserves and idle assets, and proactively making shareholder proposals to increase shareholder values, sometimes making open critiques at shareholder meetings towards management. He has been described as the "most successful activist in Japanese history" and the "originator of Japanese activism".

Japanese shareholders tended to be (or are perceived to be) passive investors in regards to the management of corporations. His typical style of investment involves obtaining shares in a target corporation, and making them focus on profitable business domains in order to maximize shareholder value. Investment examples of this included Tokyo Style, Nippon Broadcasting System, Hanshin Electric Railway, etc. As the size of investments grew, 6 years after the establishment of the fund, Murakami was arrested for accusations of insider trading of shares in Nippon Broadcasting Systems. The Murakami Fund was managing assets valued at USD 5 billion by 2006.

In 2007, Yoshiaki Murakami was convicted of insider trading in violation of article 167 of the Securities and Exchange law. While initially sentenced to two years in prison, this was suspended on appeal and a later appeal to Japan's Supreme Court was dismissed, upholding the conviction for illegal insider trading.

He subsequently moved to Singapore in 2009, to focus on real estate investments. He attempted but failed to gain seats on Kuroda Electric Co.'s board in August 2015. By 2021, his investments were flourishing. On 5 August 2024 the Japanese stock market experienced its biggest declines since 1987 and Murakami was one of a number of investors who made significant investments as a result. In 2025 his firm City Index Eleventh was again involved in shareholder activism, amassing a 16% stake in Fuji Media Holdings and pushing for subsidiary spin offs (a form of divestment) to increase the share price.

== Idemitsu Kosan ==
Idemitsu Kosan Co., Ltd. and Showa Shell Sekiyu K.K. entered into merger negotiations in July 2015, but the founding family of Idemitsu, major shareholders in the company, was against the merger, and discussions between the family and Idemitsu management were forced into a halt. In the fall of 2017, a person in the financial industry that was close to the founding family requested that Murakami advise the family. Murakami obtained under 1% of the outstanding shares in Idemitsu, in order to get involved “sincerely, with the perspective of a shareholder, and not as an outsider”. By February 2018 he was in contact with Idemitsu management, and bridged the gap between management and the founding family. On July 10, 2018, Idemitsu and Showa Shell officially announced their agreement to merge. Idemitsu Chairman Takashi Tsukioka made a rare public statement praising Murakami, saying “It is a fact that Murakami, a distinguished investor, advised the founding family from a fair standpoint on the necessity of the merger in order to maximize the joint benefit of all stakeholders including the founding family, improving the relationship between Idemitsu and the family. I thank him for his selfless efforts to date.”
