= Tatsuo Yada =

Japanese politician

- 矢田 立郎
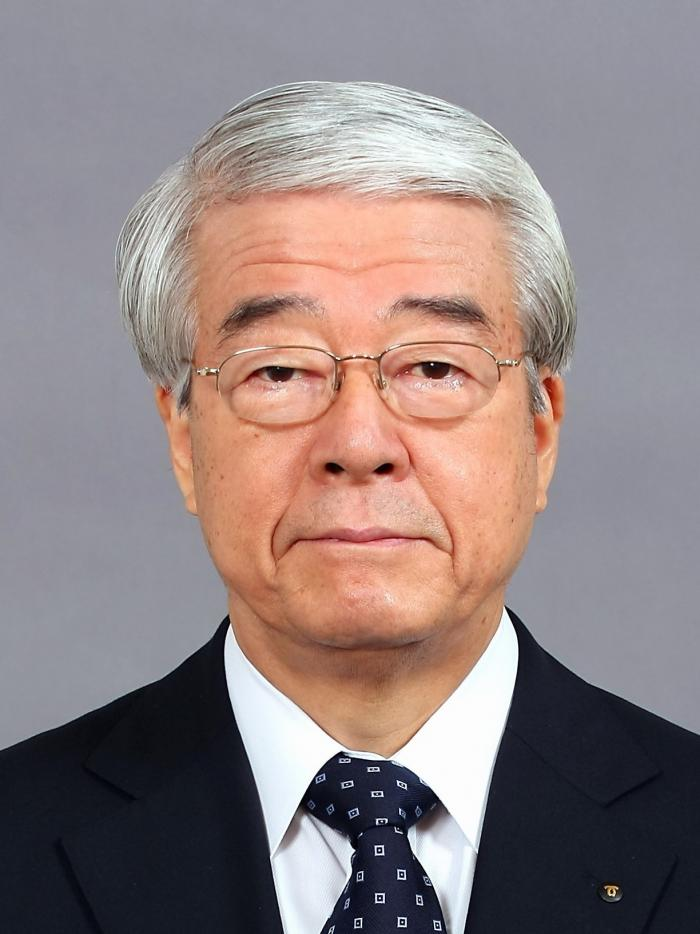

Mayor of Kobe
- In office 20 November 2001 – 19 November 2013
- Preceded by: Kazutoshi Sasayama
- Succeeded by: Kizō Hisamoto

Personal details
- Born: 7 February 1940 (age 86) Kobe, Hyōgo, Japan
- Party: Independent
- Education: Kansai University

Tatsuo Yata (矢田 立郎, Yata Tatsuo; born 7 February 1940) is a Japanese politician who became the mayor of Kobe, the capital city of Hyōgo Prefecture in Japan from 2001 until 2013. He was first elected in October 2001 and won the re-election four years later.
