= Masahiko Katsuya =

Japanese journalist, columnist and television commentator (1960–2018)

- 勝谷 誠彦
- Born: 6 December 1960; Amagasaki, Hyōgo Prefecture, Japan
- Died: 28 November 2018 (aged 57); Amagasaki, Hyōgo Prefecture, Japan
- Education: Waseda University
- Occupations: Journalist, columnist, television commentator, photographer, author
- Years active: 1985–2018

Masahiko Katsuya (勝谷 誠彦, Katsuya Masahiko) (6 December 1960 – 28 November 2018) was a Japanese journalist, columnist, television commentator, photographer and author. After graduating from Waseda University, he joined the publishing company Bungeishunjū in 1985 and worked as a reporter and desk editor for publications including Shūkan Bunshun, Bungeishunjū and Marco Polo. His reporting assignments included the Cambodian Civil War and the Gulf War.

Katsuya left Bungeishunjū in 1996 and subsequently worked independently as a columnist, writer and television personality. He appeared regularly on Japanese television programmes including Yajiuma Plus, Sukkiri!! and Takajin no Sokomade Itte Iinkai, and later hosted the Sun Television talk programme Katsuyama Sahiko Show. In 2017, he unsuccessfully stood as an independent candidate in the 2017 Hyōgo gubernatorial election.

== Early life and education ==
Katsuya was born in Amagasaki, Hyōgo Prefecture, on 6 December 1960. He attended Nada High School before entering the First Faculty of Literature at Waseda University, where he studied literature.

While at university, Katsuya began working as a freelance writer. He later graduated from Waseda and joined Bungeishunjū in 1985.

== Journalism and writing career ==
At Bungeishunjū, Katsuya worked on publications including Shūkan Bunshun, Bungeishunjū and Marco Polo. As a reporter, he covered domestic and international stories, including the Cambodian Civil War and Gulf War.

He left the company in 1996 and began working independently as a columnist, photographer and writer. His work appeared in magazines and other publications, and he also became known for commentary on current affairs through television and radio appearances.

Katsuya wrote both fiction and nonfiction. His books included the novel Diaspora (ディアスポラ), published by Bungeishunjū. The novel depicts Japanese people living as refugees following the collapse of Japan and was reviewed in the Asahi Shimbun in 2011. His other books included works of essays, travel writing and food writing.

== Television career ==
Katsuya became a frequent commentator on Japanese television. Oricon records more than 1,100 television appearances by him, including regular appearances on programmes such as Sukkiri!! and appearances on Yajiuma Plus and other news and variety programmes.

He was a regular panellist on the Yomiuri Television current affairs programme Takajin no Sokomade Itte Iinkai until leaving the programme in March 2013.

From 2013, he hosted Katsuyama Sahiko Show (カツヤマサヒコSHOW) on Sun Television. The programme, his first television programme bearing his own name, was structured around Katsuya playing the editor of a fictional magazine and interviewing guests in a bar-style studio setting.

Katsuya was also a Monday commentator on the Nippon Television morning programme Sukkiri!!. In February 2015, Nippon Television announced that he would leave the programme at the end of March as part of a regular change in commentators. His final appearance was on 23 March 2015.

== Political activity ==
In April 2017, Katsuya announced that he would contest the 2017 Hyōgo gubernatorial election as an independent candidate. At his announcement, he praised aspects of the incumbent prefectural administration but argued that Hyōgo had become "a little dark" and said he wanted to make the prefecture more lively.

The election was held on 2 July. Katsuya campaigned in part against the length of incumbent governor Toshizō Ido's tenure, arguing that political leadership in the prefecture needed renewal. He also referred to his experience travelling and reporting throughout Japan and overseas, saying that he wanted to use that knowledge to contribute to his home prefecture.

Katsuya finished second with 646,967 votes, or 35.1 per cent of the vote. Ido was re-elected to a fifth term with 944,544 votes, or 51.2 per cent.

== Illness and death ==
In August 2018, Katsuya was hospitalised after experiencing severe abdominal pain and swelling. He was subsequently diagnosed with severe alcoholic hepatitis and underwent treatment.

Katsuya died of liver failure at a hospital in Amagasaki at 1:48 a.m. on 28 November 2018. He was 57.

== Selected works ==
- Diaspora (ディアスポラ)
- Dassai: Ama Kakeru Hi no Moto no Sake (獺祭 天翔ける日の本の酒)
- Baka ga Tonari ni Sunde Iru (バカが隣りに住んでいる)
