= Nada High School =

Private boys school in Kobe, Hyōgo Prefecture, Japan

Coordinates: 34°43′9.1″N 135°16′6.3″E

- 灘高等学校
- Kobe, Hyōgo Prefecture, Japan

Information
- Type: Private
- Motto: 精力善用 自他共栄
- Established: 1927
- Headmaster: Masakazu Kaiho
- Enrollment: 220 per grade (180 are from Nada Junior High School, the affiliate school of Nada High School)

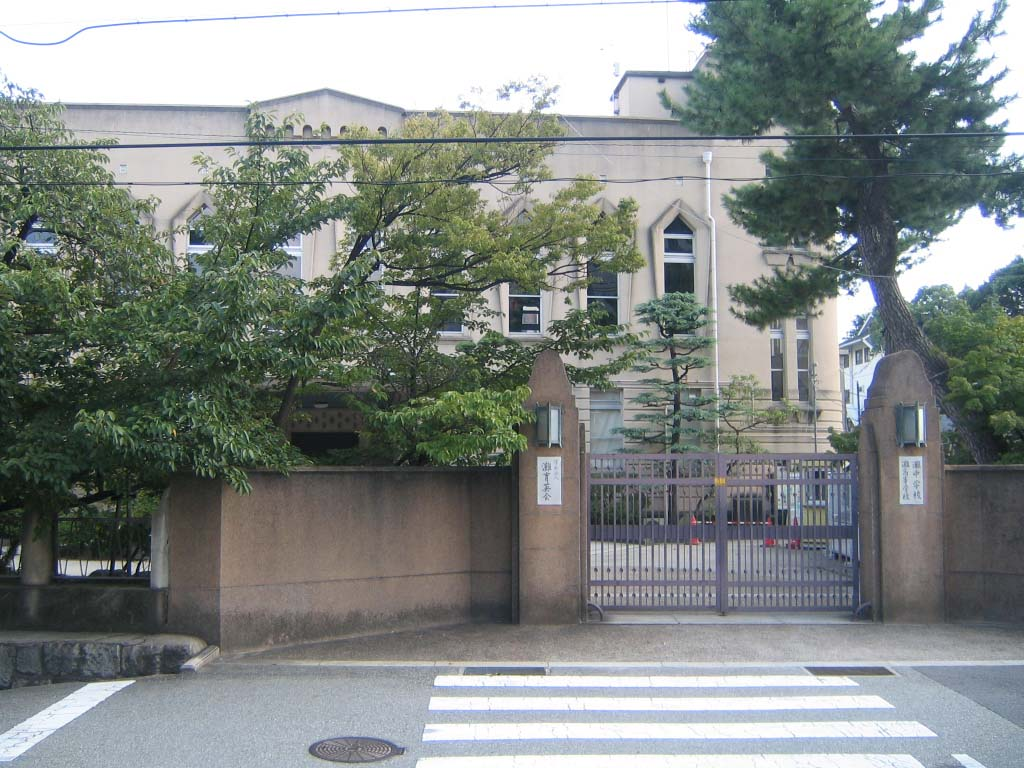
Nada Junior High School and Senior High School. No. 8-5-1 Uozaki Kitamachi, Higashinada-ku, Kobe City, Hyogo Prefecture.

Nada High School (Japanese: 灘高等学校), is private, college-preparatory, boys school located in Kobe, Hyōgo Prefecture, Japan, providing six years of education combining junior and senior high school levels. Founded in 1927, it's frequently cited and ranked as the best high school in all of Japan. Graduates often make up the majority of admissions to Japan's most prestigious universities, like the University of Tokyo and Kyoto University. The school's alumni include Nobel laureates in Chemistry Ryōji Noyori, novelist Shūsaku Endō, and politician Yasutoshi Nishimura.

Nada High School offers courses a range of electives. In addition, the school offers a concentration program in Judo. The Judo class during freshman year are intended to commemorate the founder of the school, Kanō Jigorō.

Nada High School also offers a range of extracurricular activities, including interscholastic teams in sports, academic clubs, and student-run publications. The school is known for encouraging a liberal educational space, student autonomy.

== Establishment ==
The School was found as Nada Middle School by the sake producers of Nada-Gogō, Kanō Jiroemon (Kiku-Masamune, now Kiku-Masamune Sake Brewing Co., Ltd.), Kanō Jihē (Hakutsuru, now Hakutsuru Sake Brewing Company Limited), and Yamamura Tazaemon (Sakuramasamune, now Sakuramasamune Company, Limited).

Kanō Jigorō, father of Judo born in this Kano family in the town of Mikage (now within Higashinada-ku, Kobe), also helped establish Nada Middle High School. In 1928 he gave a speech to first batch students at Nada Middle School.

There are no school uniforms and no rules regarding possessions.

== Nada Junior High School ==
Nada Junior High School is the affiliate school of Nada High School. These students attend Nada High School unconditionally after they graduate Nada Junior High School.

The curriculum of Nada Junior High School is continuous to that of Nada High School, and students of Nada Junior High School are usually taught by the same teachers for 6 years from their entrance of Nada Junior High School to their graduation of Nada High School.

Nada High School and Nada Junior High School are located in the same site and share many facilities. Many of club activities are for both high school students and junior high school students, and the student government is also unified. So it can be said that students from Nada Junior High School go to the same school for 6 years.

== Notable alumni ==
- Koro Bessho
- Shūsaku Endō
- Isshō Fujita
- Teru Fukui
- Junichi Hamada
- Kizō Hisamoto
- Kamon Iizumi
- Shoichiro Irimajiri
- Hiroyuki Kanai
- Masato Kanda
- Masahiko Katsuya
- Masaru Kitsuregawa
- Toshiyuki Kobayashi
- Ryōsuke Kōzuki
- Buichiro Kuroda
- Yūji Kuroiwa
- Toshiki Mabuchi
- Kohji Matsumoto
- Masafumi Miyamoto
- Masahito Moriyama
- Yoshiaki Murakami
- Ramo Nakajima
- Yugo Nakamura
- Gania Nishimura
- Yasutoshi Nishimura
- Toshiro Nomura
- Ryōji Noyori
- Shuji Ogino
- Yasushi Okada
- Hideyuki Sakai
- Kotaro Shimbara
- Eikei Suzuki
- Kan Suzuki
- Masaaki Suzuki
- Genichiro Takahashi
- Ryōsuke Takashima
- Satoshi Takayama
- Ikuo Towhata
- Yasuhiro Tsuji
- Toshio Tsumura
- Hisashi Yamamoto
- Ryuichi Yoneyama

== See also ==
- Secondary education in Japan
