= Okuike =

Lake and upscale residential area in Hyogo Prefecture, Japan

Coordinates: 34°46′24″N 135°17′20″E

Location of Okuike in Japan

Okuike (奥池)（おくいけ）is a small lake with an adjoining reservoir lake called the "Okuyama Chosuichi". It is surrounded by a high-class residential area and is located in Ashiya, a city in the Hyogo Prefecture of Japan. It is close to the major cities of Kobe and Osaka, and is part of the Kansai region. Okuike is located on a height of approximately 500–600 meters above sea level on the Southern aspect, and is located towards the Eastern part of Mount Rokkō (六甲山, Rokkō-san). The "village" of Okuike is home to around 730 properties and is often referred to as the "Beverly Hills of Japan". It is said to have an excellent natural landscape in its residential areas due to regulations such as Japan's "Mansion Ordinance" and the Natural Parks Act. Due to these, buildings can only be constructed on existing plots of land and no subdivisions can occur. The altitude of Okuike allows it to have far reaching views, sometimes of 100 kilometers (or more) across Osaka Bay, towards the Nara prefecture, the Kii Mountains (Mount Hakkyō 1,914 meters), the Wakayama prefecture, Awajishima, Shikoku, Kansai International Airport, Osaka, Kobe, the Akashi Kaikyō Bridge (明石海峡大橋, Akashi Kaikyō Ōhashi) and the Seto Inland Sea National Park. From certain parts of Okuike, it is possible to spot at least 6 prefectures: Hyogo, Osaka, Tokushima, Kyoto, the Nara Prefecture, and the Wakayama Prefecture. Okuike is accessible through the tolled Royu Parkway/Driveway.

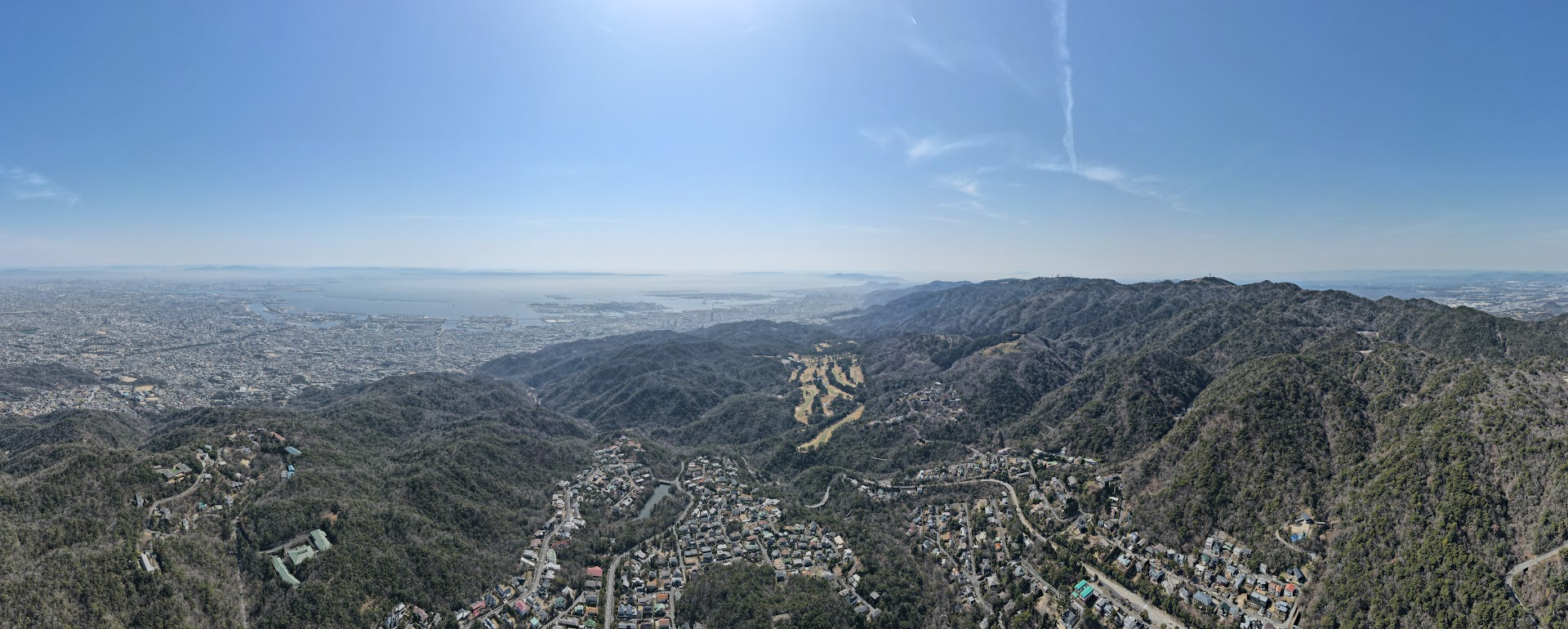
Okuike foreground; Osaka left; Kobe center; Rokko Mountain right; Nara, Wakayama, Awajishima, Shikoku & Seto Naikai distant. Picture by Sebastien Avinc

== History ==
The Okuike Lake was completed in the Edo era (around the year 1841). This was achieved after over 20 years of difficult excavation work by Sarumaru Matazaemon Yasutoki, the Ashiya village chief at that time, who was dealing with a water shortage crisis in the village. The Okuyama Reservoir was completed beside the Okuike Lake in 1972, and both are still utilized today as a water source by Ashiya city.

In the 1960's, the present Royu Parkway or (Royu Driveway) road was constructed and the development of Okuike began. Initially, the buildings in Okuike had mostly been company owned retreats. In the early to mid 1970's, the first private residential houses were built. Following this, more private houses were constructed and Okuike began its transformation from being a company retreat area to a being a residential neighborhood. With regular bus services and its close proximity to Ashiya city, it considered to be a convenient place to live. Currently, Okuike is composed primarily of private residential properties.

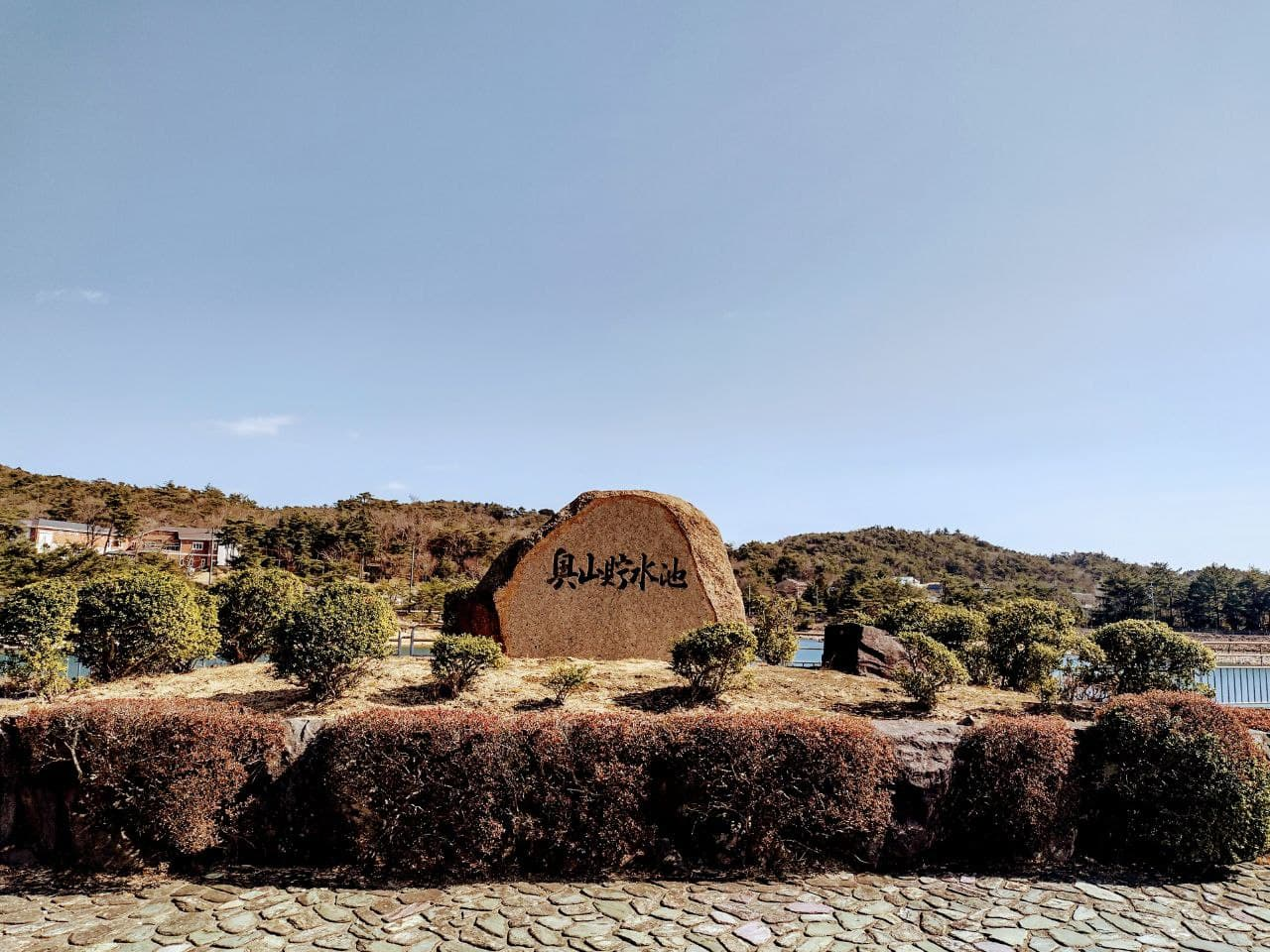
Okuike, Okuyama Chosuichi - The Rock

== Geography ==
Divided between the two small districts of Okuike cho and Okuike Minami cho, Okuike sits at approximately 34° North and 135° East. It has an altitude of between 500 and 600 meters on the Southern Aspect and is located towards the Eastern end of Mount Rokko in the Hyogo Prefecture of the Honshu Island in Japan. The Rokko Mountains are a steep range (Rokko-zan peak at 931 meters) located largely within the city limits of Kobe, but also covering parts of neighboring cities and towns such as Ashiya City. The range is largely constructed of the late cretaceous Rokko Granite. Here, various streams converge their feeds into the main Okuike lake. This in turn, serves as a feeder for the Ashiyagawa (Ashiya River) which flows down the mountain, through Ashiya city, and into Osaka Bay. The location generally has a humid subtropical climate, however, temperatures can regularly drop below freezing in the winter with snow. Temperatures in Okuike is generally, 5 to 6 degrees less than the Ashiya city located below, which allows the area to feel comfortable in high summer, when temperatures at sea level can get between 35 and 40 degrees C.

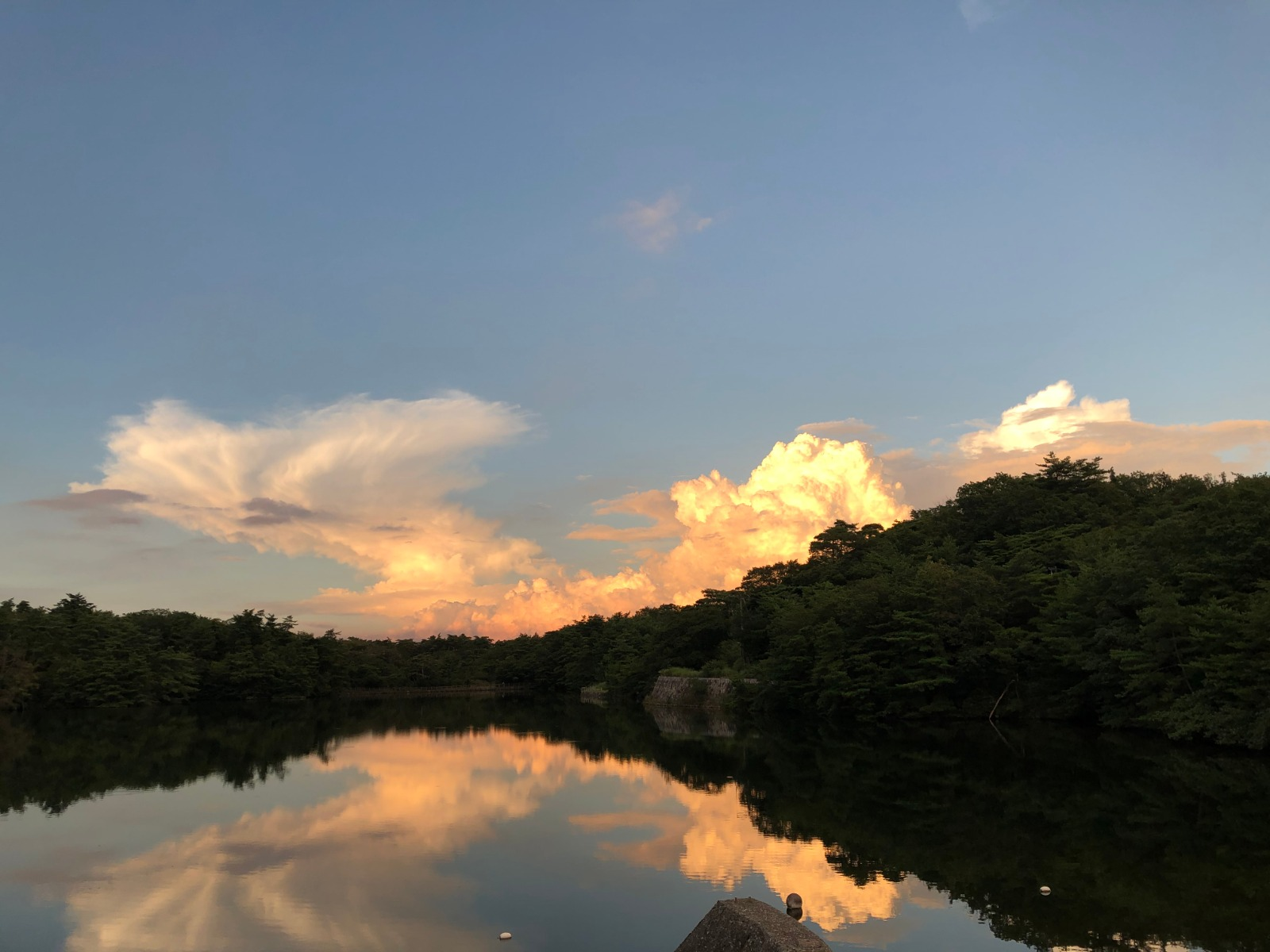
Okuike Pond

== Flora and fauna ==
Okuike is famed for its abundance of brightly coloured Hydrangea macrophylla (or bigleaf Hydrangea). It is also referred to as French hydrangea, lacecap hydrangea, mophead hydrangea, penny mac and hortensia. Additionally, the area is heavily forested with kuromatsu, tall mountain pine trees that cover the forest area.

Okuike is also home to a diverse blend of fauna, including:

- Inushishi, wild Japanese boar
- Itachi, (イタチ) Japanese weasel
- Aodaishō, Japanese Rat Snake
- Mamushi, Japanese pit viper
- Koi Fish (in Okuike Lake)
- Uguisu (鶯), Japanese bush warbler, are often heard in abundance from mid-March each year.
- Kawasemi, Japanese Common Kingfisher
- Ukai, Japanese Cormorant (ウミウ)
- Kitsune - Japanese Fox
- Nousagi, ( 野兎 ) Japanese Hare
- Araiguma, Racoon

== Access ==
Travellers can access Okuike through bus shuttles from Ashiya Hanshin, Ashiya JR, and Ashiyagawa Stations. These buses include the Hankyu Bus 80 towards Arima Onsen or the Hankyu Bus 81 toward Ashiya Highland. From Ashiya, Okuike is also accessible by car using the Royu parkway toll road.

== Residents of Okuike ==
Many residents in Okuike are considered to be affluent, high net worth individuals made up of business owners, entrepreneurs, and CEOs/Chairmen of major international corporations. Other residents are said to be successful artists, fashion and jewelry designers, Nobel Prize winners, Olympians, and novelists. Due to this, some consider Okuike to be the creative hub of Ashiya city.

In Okuike, the average size for a residential plot of land is around 600 square meters, which is considered large for Japan.

=== Resident nationalities ===
There is a sizeable population of foreign residents in Okuike, with nationalities like the Scottish, English, Swiss, German, Norwegian, Australian, French, South African, Indian, Venezuelan, Peruvian, American, Canadian, Brazilian, Taiwanese, Israeli, and more. Many of these residents, as well as local Japanese residents, have come together to form the Okuike International Club.

=== Notable houses ===
- Koshino House – designed by Tadao Ando
- Lantern House (formerly Glass House) – designed by Yamazaki Yasutaka
- Okuike house – Mitsuru Nomura
- Moss Garden House – designed by Tadao Ando
- Lifted House – Sekiya Masato of Planet Creations
- Blue House – NRM Architects
- Small House in the Pine Trees – Yamazaki Yasutaka
- Okuike Villa/Mountain House – Sachiko Fukiage
- Villa of Okuike – Atsushi Shikaki
- Okuike K – Sinato Inc.
- Villa Okuike -
- House in Okuike – Tomohiro Hata
- Okuike Summer House – Maneira Architects
- House in Okuike Minamicho – GodaiDCM
- White Okuike House – Masaaki Hisatake
- E-House – BASARA
- Atlier Okuike – Kobayashi Tsune Architects

== Surroundings ==
- JR Ashiya Station (13 minutes by car)
- Rokrokuso Town (13 minute drive)
- Arima Onsen (17 minute drive)
- Rokko Garden Terrace (20 minutes by car)
