= Morinosuke Kawaguchi =

Japanese futurist and innovation expert

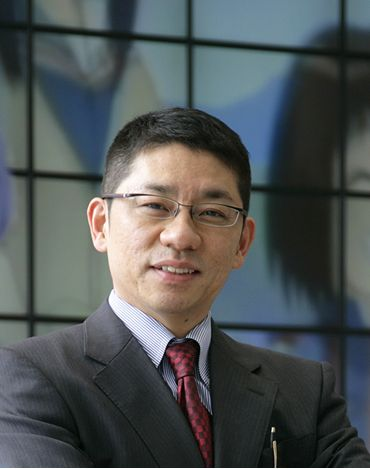
- Morinosuke Kawaguchi in Akihabara in 2008
- Born: May 1, 1961 ( Age 60), Ashiya, Hyogo, Japan
- Known for: Technology management, Product Design, Product Engineering, Strategy, otaku, subculture, innovation, Futurist

Morinosuke Kawaguchi (川口盛之助, b. May 1, 1961 in Ashiya, Hyogo, Japan) is a Japanese futurist and innovation expert. He is the founder of Morinoske Company Ltd., a Tokyo-based management and design consultancy. Since October 2019 he has been a guest professor at Waseda University in Tokyo. Previously, from 2002 till 2013 he was working for Arthur D. Little Japan. Also a lecturer in the postgraduate program at the Tokyo Institute of Technology in 2008 and in 2009, and Doshisha Business School in 2012 and in 2013, his approach to Japanese subculture and how it comprises a competitive advantage in R&D has made him popular in Japan.

Kawaguchi is renowned as a strategy expert in Management of Technology (MOT), intellectual property management and also technology & innovation management (TIM) in various industries such as telecommunications, electronics and the automotive industry. In Japan, he is considered the inventor of the concept in product engineering and technology development of drawing from Japanese culture, especially the concepts of monozukuri and otaku subcultures.

He is a bilingual lecturer on this topic and has appeared on several Japanese radio and Television shows. Kawaguchi writes regularly on Japanese technology development, creating a bridge between the hard-boiled industry and creative subculture. From 2007 until 2010 he had an ongoing biweekly column for the Nikkei BP online and another for TechOn online. Also, from February 2009 until January 2010, he wrote a series of articles on anime-like engineering and technology for DIME, a magazine comparable to WIRED in the US.

Kawaguchi became well known after his book Otaku de onnanoko na kuni no monozukuri (Neon Genesis of Geeky-Girly Japanese Engineering) was published in 2007 by Kodansha, earning the prestigious Nikkei BP BizTech Book Award in 2008. The central message of the book is how to leverage Japanese subculture for top-tier product development and innovation. It has been translated into Chinese, Korean, Thai and English.

This book was reviewed by all the five major Japanese newspapers, a rare honor for a business book there. Famed fashion designer Hanae Mori had a lot of praise for Kawaguchi's book, reviewing it for the Sankei Shimbun newspaper. On the cover of the book, Taro Aso, the 92nd Prime Minister of Japan, gives a blurb, describing the book as one "filled with wisdom and hints on how to leverage Japanese subculture’s potential." Korea and Taiwan published translated versions of the title at the end of 2009. The Thai translation was published in 2011. The English translation, titled Geeky-Girly Innovation: A Japanese Subculturalist's Guide to Technology and Design, was published in July 2012.

Morinosuke Kawaguchi published his second book Sekai ga zessan suru « Made by Japan » (The World Acclaimed « Made by Japan ») in December 2010, again describing a unique concept in technology and design. The central question of the book is how machines and products can make our lives happier and what the future of all machines will look like.

Kawaguchi is also co-author and committee member of Fukushima project, a government-independent, crowd-funded investigation about the Fukushima Daiichi nuclear disaster and the role of TEPCO's top management in the catastrophy. The committee published a book in early 2012, uncovering several contradictions in TEPCO's communication to the public and events at the power plant.

His book, メガトレンド 2014-2023 (Megatrends 2014–2023) was published by Nikkei Business Publications at the end of 2013. For this future forecasting book, Kawaguchi researched and analyzed fifty major trends, including those in mature markets and also growth opportunities in emerging economies. The book has been updated three times, and its latest version, Megatrends 2019-2028 is currently selling on the Japanese market for 600,000 yen a copy.

In 2014, in the same Megatrends series, published by Nikkei BP, Kawaguchi co-authored two more books. One, titled, Megatrends 2014-2024 The Auto and Energy Industry, includes two books in one package, one written by car journalist Yoshirou Tsuruhara and one by Morinosuke Kawaguchi. The other Megatrends book is titled Megatrends 2014-2024 ICT and Electronics, includes two volumes in one package, one written by alpha blogger Ichiro Yamamoto and the other book by Morinosuke Kawaguchi.

In June 2016, Morinosuke Kawaguchi's book titled "日本人も知らなかった日本の国力ソフトパワー Gross National Talent: Quantitative Analysis of Amazing Japanese Soft Power" was published by the Japanese publishing house, Discover 21. In this book, Kawaguchi unveiled a concept he had named "Gross National Talent", and its corresponding "Gross National Talent Index".

In March 2021, Morinosuke Kawaguchi's latest book titled 超万物開闢図譜(ちょうばんぶつかいびゃくずふ) Complete Analysis of Price-Value Interrelation: A Comparative Approach, was published by Nikkei BP, and is selling in Japan for 800,000 yen a copy.
