= Ashiya, Hyōgo =

Ashiya 芦屋市
- City
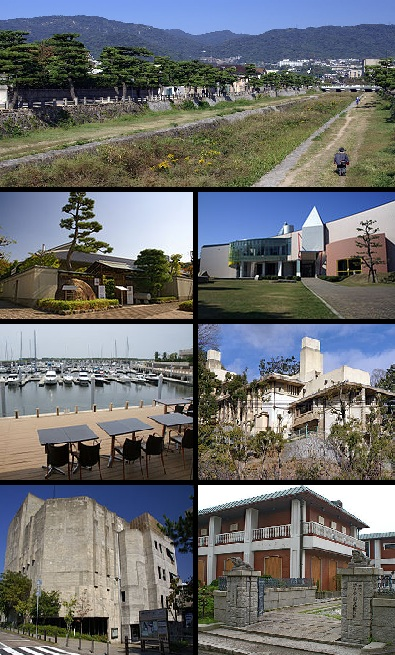
- Clockwise from top, Ashiya River, Ashiya Municipal Museum Art, Yodoko Guest House, Emba Museum of Modern Art, Ashiya Citizen Center, Bell Port Ashiya, Jyunichiro Tanizaki Memorial Hall

- Flag Emblem
- Interactive map of Ashiya
- Location in Japan
- Coordinates: 34°43′40″N 135°18′12″E
- Country: Japan
- Region: Kansai
- Prefecture: Hyōgo

Government
  - Mayor: Ryōsuke Takashima (from 1 May 2023)

Area
  - Total: 18.47 km^{2} (7.13 sq mi)

Population (1 June 2024)
  - Total: 92,976
  - Density: 5,034/km^{2} (13,040/sq mi)
- Time zone: UTC+09:00 (JST)
- City hall address: 7-6 Seidōchō, Ashiya-shi, Hyōgo-ken 659-8501
- Website: Official website
- Symbols
- Flower: Kobano-mitsuba-tsutsuji
- Tree: Japanese Black Pine

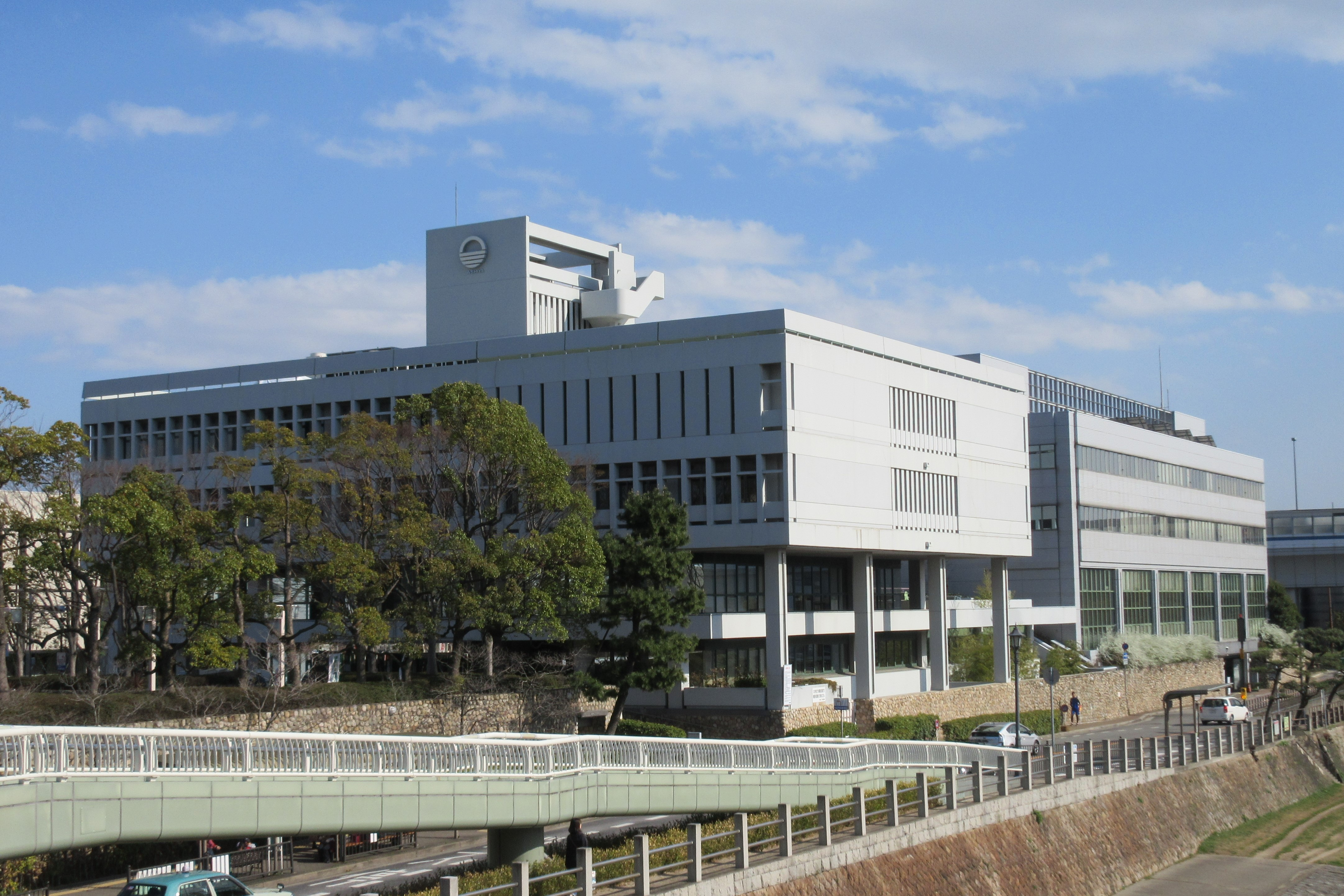
Ashiya City Hall

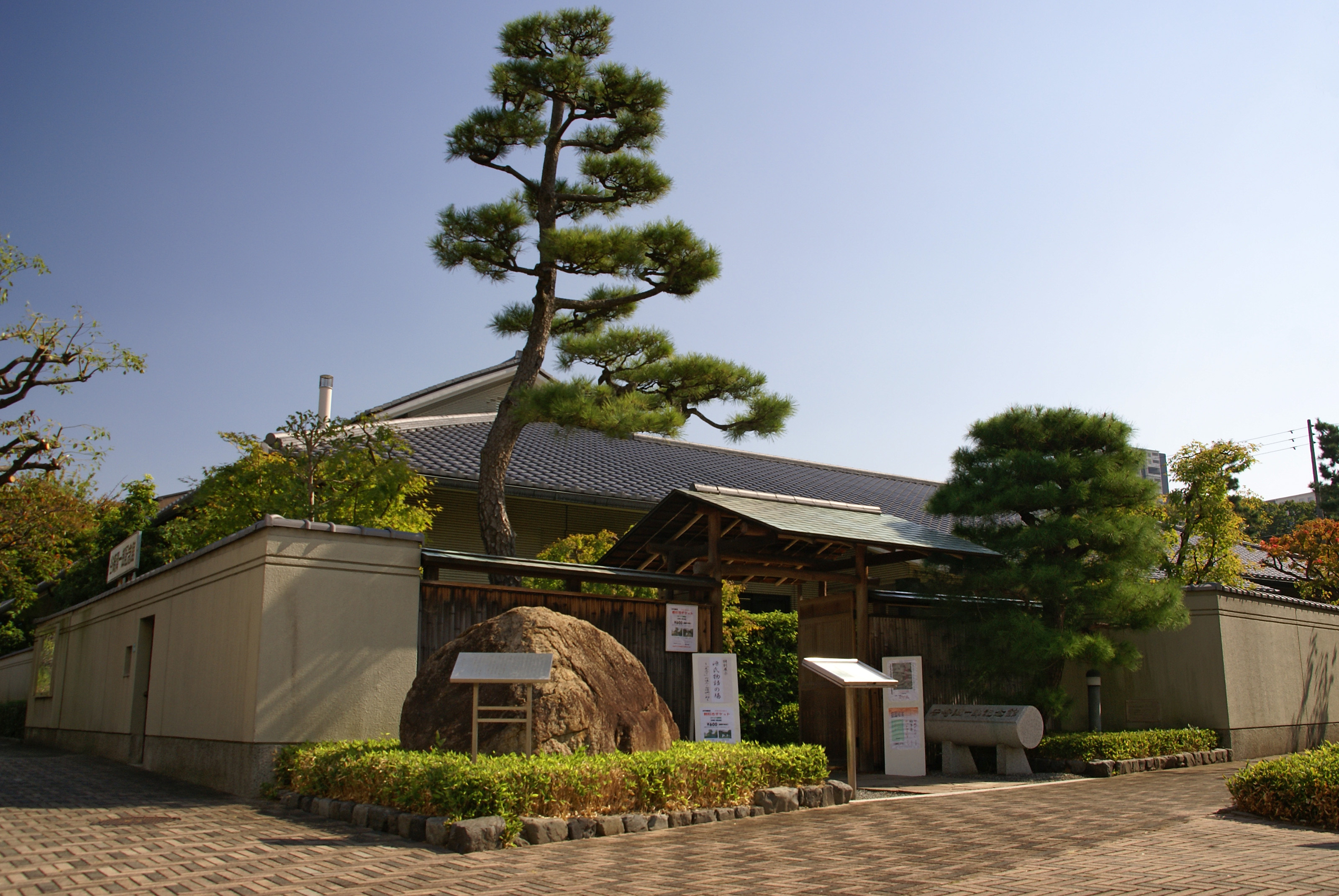
Tanizaki Junichiro Memorial Museum

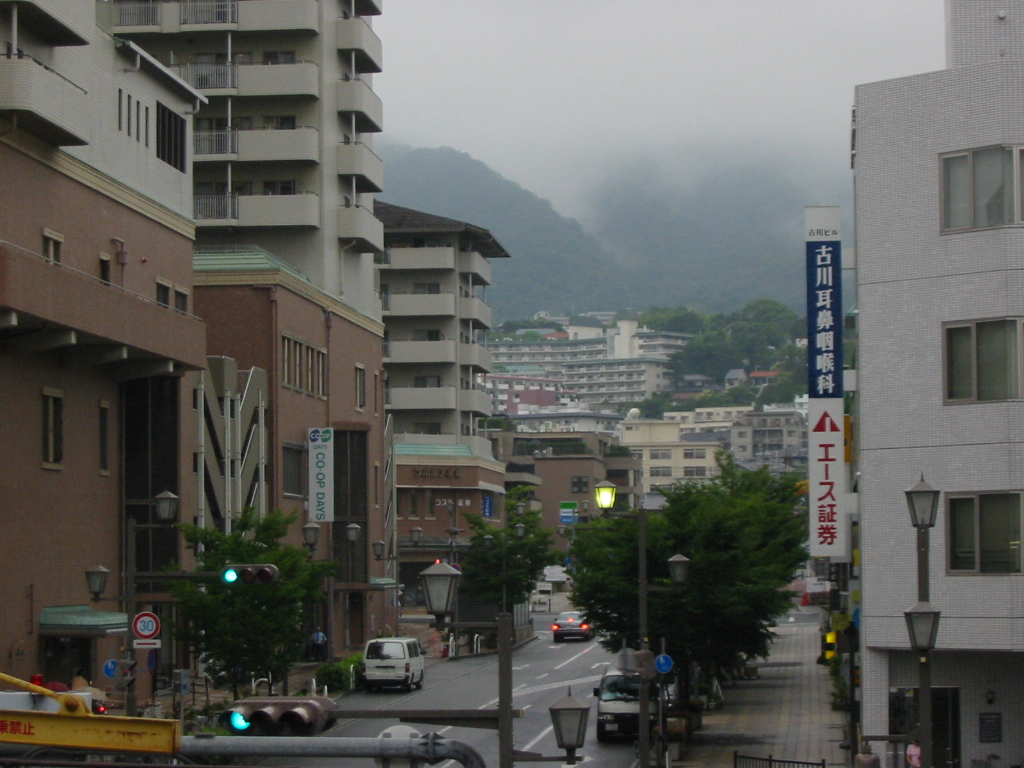
Ashiya seen from Ashiya Station

Ashiya (芦屋市, Ashiya-shi; Japanese pronunciation: [ä̀.ɕí.jä́(.ɕì)]) is a city in Hyōgo Prefecture, Japan. As of 1 June 2024, the city had an estimated population of 92,976 in 43,229 households and a population density of 5,000 persons per km^{2}. The total area of the city is 53.44 square kilometres (20.63 sq mi). It has a reputation as a high-end residential area and is the municipality with the highest average income in Japan, outside the richest wards of Tokyo.

== Geography ==
Ashiya is located between Kobe and Nishinomiya, and is the second smallest municipality in Hyōgo Prefecture. The ground gentle slopes from the Rokko Mountains in the north to Osaka Bay in the south.

=== Neighboring municipalities ===
Hyōgo Prefecture

- Higashinada-ku, Kobe
- Nishinomiya

=== Climate ===
Ashiya has a humid subtropical climate (Köppen Cfa) characterized by warm summers and cool winters with light snowfall. The average annual temperature in Ashiya is 14.6 °C. The average annual rainfall is 1,578 mm with September as the wettest month. The temperatures are highest on average in August, at around 26.4 °C (79.5 °F), and lowest in January, at around 3.3 °C (37.9 °F).

== Demographics ==
Per Japanese census data, the population of Ashiya has been increasing since the 1920s.

Historical population
Year	Pop.	±%
1920	11,151	—
1930	28,404	+154.7%
1940	39,137	+37.8%
1950	42,951	+9.7%
1960	57,050	+32.8%
1970	70,938	+24.3%
1980	81,745	+15.2%
1990	87,524	+7.1%
2000	83,834	−4.2%
2010	93,238	+11.2%
2020	93,922	+0.7%

== History ==
The area of Ashiya was part of ancient Settsu Province and was mostly tenryō territory under direct control the Tokugawa shogunate during the Edo Period. Ashiya was established in 1871 as a township in Hyōgo Prefecture and was designated part of Seido village (精道村) on 1 April 1889, with the creation of the modern municipalities system. In the early 1900s, it was designated as an urban planning area and became one of the centers of the Hanshinkan Modernism movement in terms of architecture and culture. This led to the building of large single-family homes with tennis courts, swimming pools, and tea houses, etc. along the hills overlooking Osaka Bay. Seido was promoted to city status on 10 November 1940, changing its name to "Ashiya".

In 1945, the City of Ashiya prohibited the operation of pachinko parlors, gambling and entertainment facilities as well as small factories. This ordinance includes prohibitions on rooftop advertisements, advertising balloons, and a complete ban on flashing lights. Those laws still stand and there is no other municipal government with similar regulations in Japan. In 1991, Ashiya residents elected Harue Kitamura as the first woman to hold the office of mayor of a city in Japan. Kitamura was mayor when Ashiya suffered major damage during the Kobe earthquake on 17 January 1995. Over 50% of the urban area of Ashiya was destroyed by the earthquake, and there were 444 fatalities. In 2023, Ashiya residents elected 26 year old Ryōsuke Takashima, making him the youngest mayor ever in Japan.

== Government ==
Ashiya has a mayor-council form of government with a directly elected mayor and a unicameral city council of 21 members. Ashiya contributes one member to the Hyōgo Prefectural Assembly. In terms of national politics, the city is part of Hyōgo 7th districts of the lower house of the Diet of Japan.

== Economy ==
Ashiya is primarily a residential city and commuter town for the Osaka and Kobe metropoles.

== Education ==
Ashiya has eight public elementary schools and three public middle schools operated by the city government, and two public high schools operated by the Hyōgo Prefectural Board of Education. There are two private middle schools and three private high schools. In addition, the prefecture also operates one public middle school and one special education school for the handicapped.

== Transportation ==
=== Railways ===
The first railway line to the city was completed in 1905. Central Ashiya is served by JR West Ashiya Station. Hanshin Electric Railway Ashiya Station and Uchide Station serve the southern part of the city, while Hankyu Railway Ashiyagawa Station is located in the quieter northern area.

JR West - JR Kōbe Line

- Ashiya

Hankyu - Hankyū Kōbe Main Line

- Ashiyagawa

Hanshin Electric Railway - Hanshin Main Line

- Uchide - Ashiya

=== Highways ===
- Hanshin Expressway Kobe Route
- Hanshin Expressway Bayshore Route (Port of Osaka-Kobe)
  - National Route 2
  - National Route 43

== Sister cities ==
- Montebello, California, United States

A sister city agreement was signed between Ashiya and Montebello, California on 24 May 1961. Student Ambassadors are chosen to travel to Montebello every year since 1964.

== Local attractions ==
- Yodokō Guest House, a house designed by Frank Lloyd Wright located on a hill overlooking Hankyu Ashiyagawa Station and Osaka Bay. It was completed in 1924 as a residence for the Yamamura family, founders of the famous sake company "Sakuramasamune" (櫻正宗). It is open for tours. Ashiya also features the house of Hiroko Koshino, The Koshino House at about 600 meters altitude in the Okuike affluent residential area of the city, designed by Pritzker Architecture Prize winner Tadao Ando.

== Culture and people ==
Persons of note associated with Ashiya include Jirō Shirasu ("the man who reproached MacArthur"), Ryōji Noyori (Nobel prize winner), Takashi Asahina (conductor), Junichirō Tanizaki (writer), Haruki Murakami (writer), Yuriko Koike (House of Representatives member), Yōko Ogawa (writer), Tsumasaburō Bandō (kabuki actor), Morinosuke Kawaguchi (futurist), Tsuruko Yamazaki (artist), Takuya Kuroda (jazz trumpeter and arranger), Takakeishō Mitsunobu (professional sumo wrestler), Kisenosato Yutaka (professional sumo wrestler and 72nd yokozuna), Tomiko Itooka (supercentenarian), and Yōko Shōgenji (media personality).

The city is the main setting in Jun'ichiro Tanizaki's novel Sasameyuki (細雪) (The Makioka Sisters, Eng. trans. Edward G. Seidensticker).
