= Kazutoshi Sasayama =

Japanese politician

- 笹山 幸俊
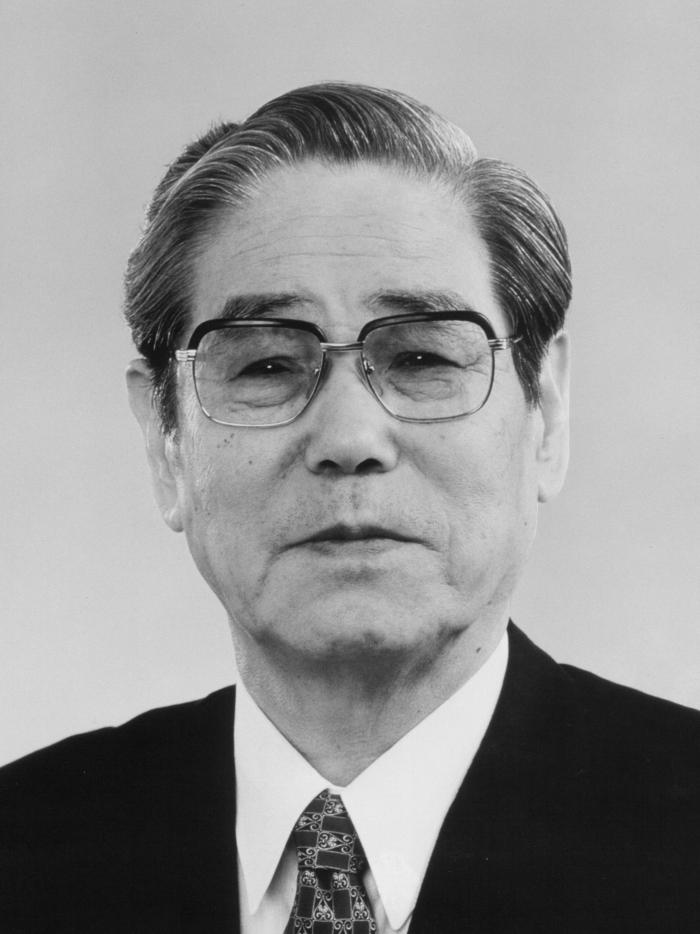

Mayor of Kobe
- In office 20 November 1989 – 19 November 2001
- Preceded by: Tatsuo Miyazaki
- Succeeded by: Tatsuo Yada

Personal details
- Born: 15 June 1924 Kagoshima Prefecture, Japan
- Died: 10 December 2011 (aged 87) Kobe, Hyōgo, Japan
- Party: Independent
- Education: Kobe Industrial College

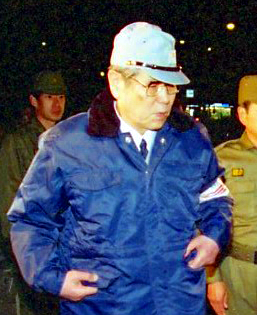
Sasayama in 1996

Kazutoshi Sasayama (笹山 幸俊, Sasayama Kazutoshi) is a Japanese politician who served as mayor of Kobe, the capital city of Hyōgo Prefecture, Japan. He served as the mayor of the city from 1989 until 2001. He was also the mayor when the Great Hanshin earthquake struck Kobe in 1995.
