= Higashi-Osaka Route =

Expressway in Osaka, Japan

Hanshin Expressway Route 13 Higashi-Osaka Route 阪神高速13号東大阪線
- The Higashi-Osaka Route highlighted in red

Route information
- Maintained by Hanshin Expressway Company, Limited
- Length: 12.5 km (7.8 mi)
- Existed: 1970–present

Major junctions
- West end: Nishisenba Junction in Chūō-ku, Osaka; Ōsakakō Route / Loop Route
- * Loop Route * Kinki Expressway
- East end: Daini Hanna Road

Location
- Country: Japan

Highway system
- National highways of Japan; Expressways of Japan

The Higashi-Osaka Route (東大阪線, Higashi-Osaka-sen), signed as Route 13, is one of the tolled routes of the Hanshin Expressway system serving the Keihanshin area in Kansai, Japan. It travels in a west to east direction from the Chūō ward of Osaka, beginning at a junction with the Loop Route and Ōsakakō Route, to the Daini Hanna Road in the city of Higashiōsaka. The expressway has a total length of 12.5 kilometers (7.8 mi).

== Route description ==
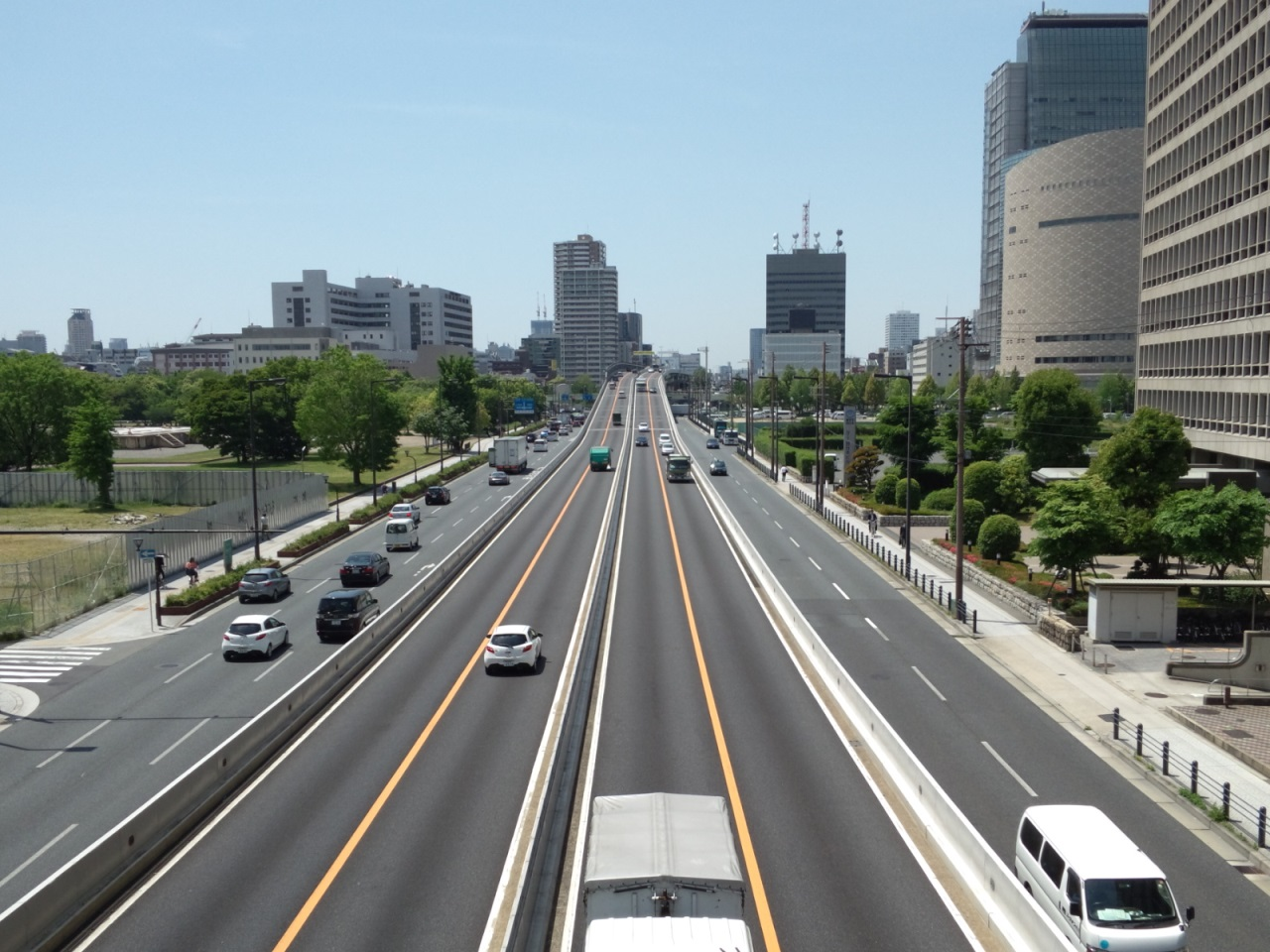
Section of the expressway that lies over Osaka Castle

The Higashi-Osaka Route travels in a west to east direction from the Chūō ward of Osaka, beginning as a one-way highway at a junction with the Loop Route and Ōsakakō Route on the western side of the Loop Route. Its next junction is a second interchange with the Loop Route on that highway's eastern side. Heading east towards Higashiōsaka and Nara, the expressway is an elevated highway running directly over the Yumehanna rail line.

When utilized with the Daini Hanna Road at the eastern end of the Higashi-Osaka Route, the combined expressways function as the most direct road connection between the city centers of Osaka and Nara.

== History ==
Construction of the Higashi-Osaka Route began in 1967 in preparation for the Expo '70 held in the nearby city of Suita. The first section of the expressway was completed after three years of construction in 1970. The entire expressway was completed by 1976, with the exception of a short section between Osaka Castle and Naniwa Nagara-Toyosaki Palace that was left unbuilt until 1978.

This section's completion was delayed due to the discovery of a trace of a palace that was found along the expressway's route during a survey done in 1960. In order to preserve the archaeological site, the elevated expressway had to be built using a structure that did not require piles. A lightweight superstructure was used to elevate the road above the site, but the structure was deemed deficient after fractures developed in it after years of use. The structure was temporarily reinforced, but it has been determined by the Hanshin Expressway Company that it will need to be replaced with a stronger structure in the future.

== List of interchanges ==
The entire expressway lies within Osaka Prefecture.

Location	km	mi	Exit	Name	Destinations	Notes
Osaka	0.0	0.0	–	Nishisenba	Loop Route – Osaka Airport; Ōsakakō Route – Kansai Airport, Tenpozan, Izumisano, Kobe	Western terminus; expressway continues as the Ōsakakō Route
Osaka	1.1	0.68	–	Higashisenba	Loop Route	
Osaka	2.0	1.2	13-01	Hōenzaka	Chūō-dōri – Banbachō, Fukaebashi, Morinomiya Station, Osaka Museum of History, Remains of Naniwanomiya Palace	Eastbound exit, westbound entrance
Osaka	2.6	1.6	13-02	Morinomiya	Chūō-dōri – Osaka Port, Honmachi, Uehonmachi-6, Banbachō	Eastbound entrance, westbound exit
Higashiōsaka	5.9	3.7	13-03	Takaida	National Route 308	Eastbound exit, westbound entrance
Higashiōsaka	8.1	5.0	13-04	Nagata	National Route 308 – Ikeda, Ishikiri, Sakai	Eastbound exit, westbound entrance
Higashiōsaka	9.0	5.6	13-05	Higashiosaka	Kinki Expressway – Suita, Ibaraki, Kyoto, Matsubara, Wakayama	
Higashiōsaka	9.4	5.8	13-06	Higashiosaka Aramoto	National Route 308 – Ikeda, Fukaebashi, Sakai, Nara, Ishikiri; Osaka Prefecture Route 2 – Sakai, Yao, Ikeda, Kadoma	
Higashiōsaka	10.1	6.3	13-07	Nakano	National Route 308 – Ishikiri; Osaka Prefecture Route 21 – Fujidera, Yao, Hirakata, Daitō	Eastbound exit, westbound entrance
Higashiōsaka	11.6	7.2	13-08	Mizuhai	National Route 308 – Ishikiri, Osaka (Morinomiya); National Route 170 – Izumisano, Yao, Takatsuki, Neyagawa	
Higashiōsaka	12.5	7.8	13-09		Daini Hanna Road – Nara	Eastern terminus; expressway continues as the Daini Hanna Road
Higashiōsaka	1.000 mi = 1.609 km; 1.000 km = 0.621 mi: Incomplete access; Route transition					
