= Loop Route =

Loop expressway in central Osaka

Hanshin Expressway Route 1 Loop 阪神高速1号環状線
- Central Osaka with the Loop Route highlighted in red

Route information
- Maintained by Hanshin Expressway Company, Limited
- Length: 10.3 km (6.4 mi)
- Existed: 1964–present

Major junctions
- Beltway around Osaka
- Sakai Route; Ōsakakō Route; Higashi-Osaka Route; Ikeda Route; Moriguchi Route; Higashi-Osaka Route

Location
- Country: Japan

Highway system
- National highways of Japan; Expressways of Japan

The Loop Route (環状線, Kanjō-sen), signed as Route 1, is one of the expressway routes of the Hanshin Expressway system serving the Keihanshin area of Japan. The route forms a complete loop that travels only in a clockwise direction around central Osaka, passing through the wards of Chūō-ku, Kita-ku, Naniwa-ku, and Nishi-ku with a total length of 10.3 kilometers (6.4 mi).

== History ==
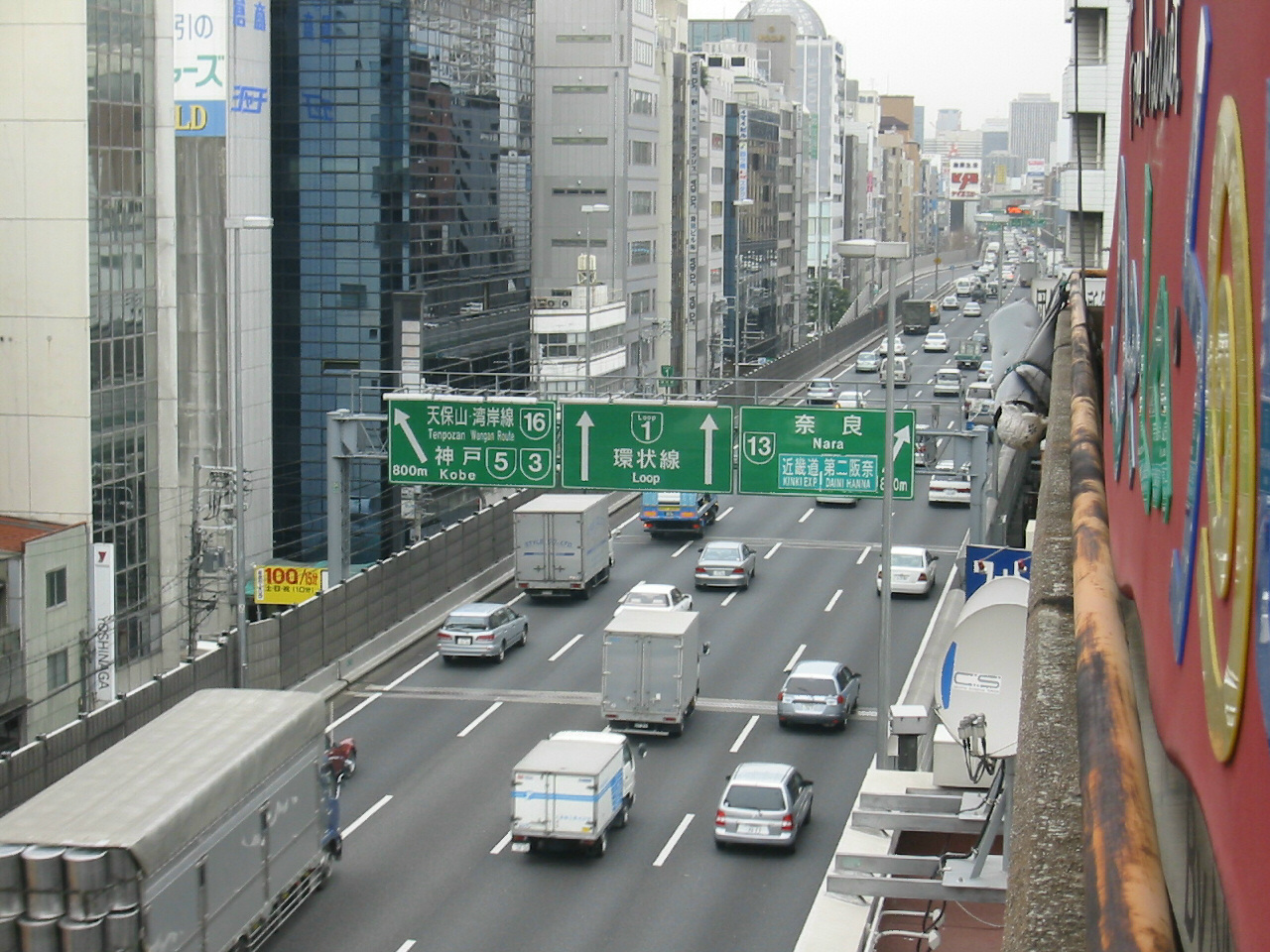
The Loop Route near Amerikamura in Chūō-ku.

In 1964, the first section of the Loop Route and the Hanshin Expressway system opened.

The expressway was popular among street racers in the 1980s, but the illegal activity declined after police began heavily patrolling the route and the stagnation of Japan's economy set in during the Lost Decade.

== List of interchanges ==
The entire expressway lies within Osaka in Osaka Prefecture.

Location	km	mi	Exit	Name	Destinations	Notes
Naniwa-ku	0.0	0.0	1-01	Minatomachi	Sennichimae-dōri – Minatomachi	Entrance from Sakai Route
Nishi-ku	0.9	0.56	1-02	Yotsubashi	Unnamed streets	Entrance only
Nishi-ku / Chūō-ku	1.6	0.99	1-03	Shinanobashi	Chūō-Ōdōri	
Chūō-ku	1.6	0.99	–	Nishisenba	Higashi-Osaka Route – to Kinki Expressway, Daini Hanna Road, Nara; Ōsakakō Route – to Kansai International Airport, Kobe Route, Bayshore Route, Kobe	
Chūō-ku	2.5	1.6	1-04	Tosabori	Unnamed streets	Exit only
Chūō-ku / Kita-ku	3.0	1.9	–	Nakanoshima	Ikeda Route north – to Osaka Airport, Meishin Expressway, Ikeda	
Kita-ku	3.3	2.1	1-05	Dōjima	Yotsubashisuji	Entrance only
Kita-ku	3.8	2.4	1-06	Kitahama	Osaka Prefecture Route 102 (Sakaisuji)	Exit only
Kita-ku	4.2	2.6	–	Tenjinbashi	Moriguchi Route north – to Kinki Expressway, Moriguchi	
Chūō-ku	4.9	3.0	1-07	Kōraibashi	Unnamed streets	Entrance only
Chūō-ku	5.0	3.1	1-08	Honmachi	Unnamed streets	Exit only
Chūō-ku	5.6	3.5	–	Higashisenba	Higashi-Osaka Route – to Kansai Airport, Osaka Airport, Osakako Route, Kinki Expressway, Tempozan, Izumisano, Kobe, Nara	
Chūō-ku	6.1	3.8	1-09	Nagahori	Unnamed streets	Entrance only
Chūō-ku	6.6	4.1	1-10	Dōtonbori	Unnamed streets	Exit only
Chūō-ku	6.9	4.3	–	Kōdzu	Sakai Route south – Sakai	
Naniwa-ku	7.8	4.8	1-12	Yūhigaoka	Osaka Prefecture Route 102	
Naniwa-ku	8.4	5.2	–	Ebisu	Matsubara Route south – to Nishi-Meihan Expressway, Hanwa Expressway, Matsubara, Tennoji	
Naniwa-ku	8.8	5.5	1-13	Ebisu-chō	Unnamed streets	Entrance only
Naniwa-ku	9.1	5.7	1-14	Nanba	Unnamed streets	Exit only
Naniwa-ku	10.3	6.4	–	Minatomachi	Sakai Route south – Sakai	
1.000 mi = 1.609 km; 1.000 km = 0.621 mi: Incomplete access

== In fiction ==
- In Wangan Midnight Maximum Tune, the Loop Route is a playable course.
