= Moriguchi Route =

Expressway in Osaka, Japan

Hanshin Expressway Route 12 Moriguchi Route 阪神高速12号守口線
- The Moriguchi Route highlighted in red

Route information
- Maintained by Hanshin Expressway Company, Limited
- Length: 10.8 km (6.7 mi)
- Existed: 1968–present

Major junctions
- South end: Tenjimbashi Junction in Kita-ku, Osaka; Loop Route
- North end: Moriguchi exit/entrance in Moriguchi; National Route 1

Location
- Country: Japan

Highway system
- National highways of Japan; Expressways of Japan

The Moriguchi Route (守口線, Moriguchi-sen), signed as Route 12, is one of the routes of the Hanshin Expressway system serving the Keihanshin area in Kansai, Japan. It travels in a southwest to northeast direction in Osaka and the neighboring city of Moriguchi, from the Loop Route, in the Kita ward of Osaka, to National Route 1 in the city of Moriguichi. The expressway has a total length of 10.8 kilometers (6.7 mi). It was first opened in 1968, but was completed in 1971.

== Route description ==
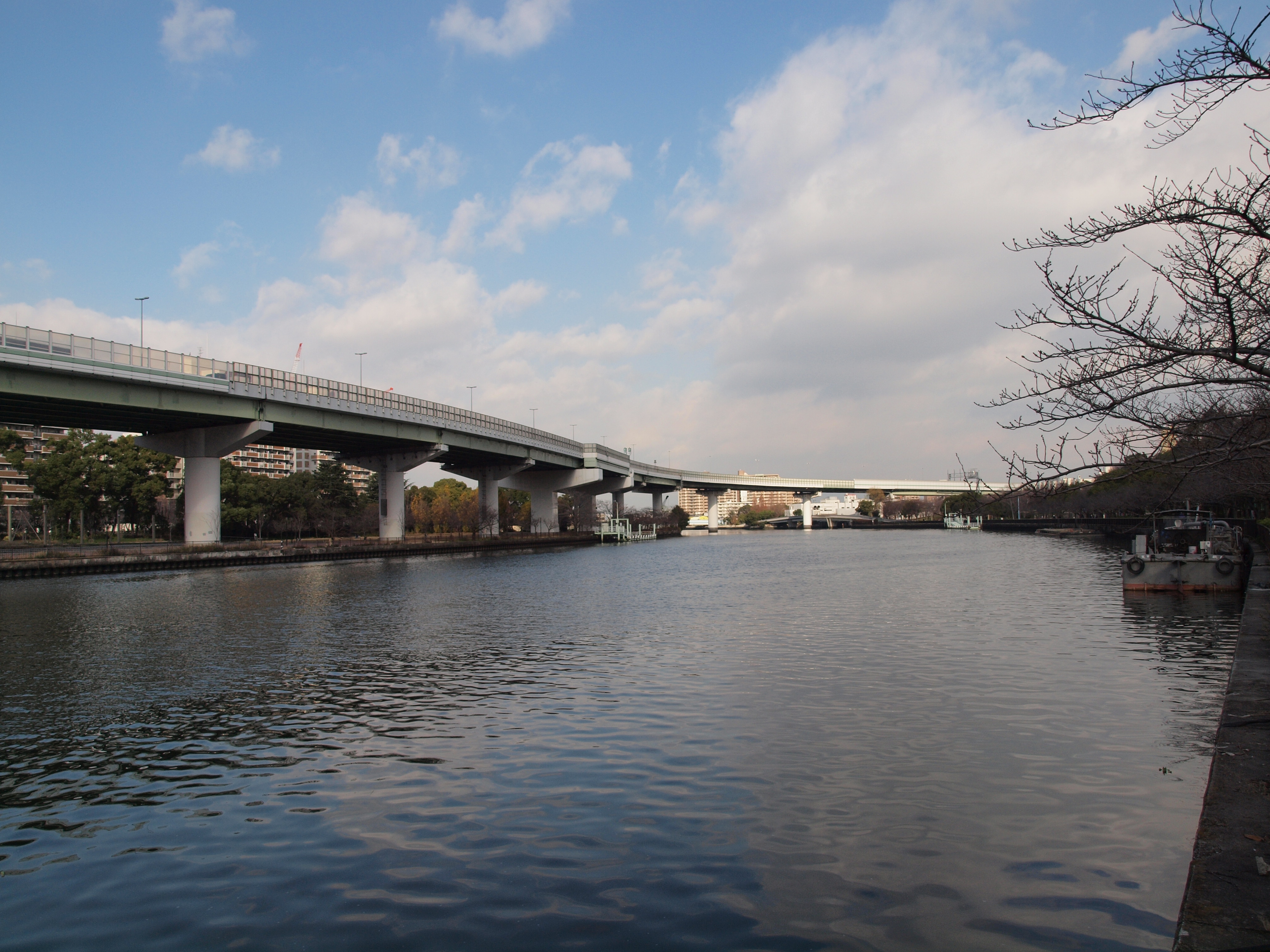
The Moriguchi Route and a tributary of the Yodo River in Miyakojima-ku, Osaka

The Moriguchi Route begins at Tenjimbashi Junction in Kita-ku, Osaka, where it meets the Loop Route. Heading north, it crosses over National Route 1 near Minami-morimachi Station. The highway then curves to the northeast after an interchange with Ōgimachi-dōri. It then crosses into the Miyakojima ward, where it begins closely paralleling the south bank of the Yodo River, a path the expressway will follow to its northern terminus. Shortly after crossing into another ward, Asahi-ku, the expressway has a junction with the Morishoji ramps that connect the expressway to National Route 163. A "mini" parking area with toilets and vending machines is placed on the entrance ramp from National Route 163.

The expressway then has a relatively long stretch of road without any junctions. During this stretch the expressway crosses into the city of Moriguchi. Near the expressway's northern end the highway has junctions with multiple roads that on a short stretch of road. The most notable of these roadways are the Kinki Expressway and National Route 1, the later of which merges into the expressway. This marks the northern terminus of the Moriguchi Route.

== History ==
Maintenance and construction of the existing and new routes of the Hanshin Expressway began in 1967 in preparation for the Expo '70, a world's fair held in Suita, Osaka, between 15 March and 13 September 1970. The first section of the project came to be known as the Moriguchi Route and opened in 1968. Construction of the Moriguchi Route was completed in 1971 after the completion of a 5.6-kilometer-long (3.5 mi) section of the expressway. A further addition was made to the expressway in 2014 when, in a series of openings, it was linked to the Kinki Expressway at Moriguchi Junction.

== List of interchanges ==
The entire expressway lies within Osaka Prefecture.

Location	km	mi	Exit	Name	Destinations	Notes
Osaka	0.0	0.0	–	Nakanoshima	Loop Route	Southern terminus
Osaka	0.6	0.37	12-01	Minamimorimachi	National Route 1 (Sonezaki-dōri) – Higashitenma, Umeda-shinmichi	Southbound exit and entrance
Osaka	1.0	0.62	12-02	Ōgimachi	Ōgimachi-dōri – Ōgimachi, Osaka Station	Northbound exit and entrance
Osaka	1.6	0.99	12-03	Nagara	Tenmabashi-suji – Tenjimbashisuji Rokuchōme, Nagarahigashi, Miyakojimahondōri	Northbound exit, southbound entrance
Osaka	4.1	2.5	12-05	Miyakoji	Osaka-Akakawa-Tennōji Road	Southbound entrance only
Osaka	4.7	2.9	12-06	Shirokita	Shirokita-suji – Suita, Kami-Shinjō, Noe	Northbound exit only
Osaka	6.4	4.0	12-07	Morishoji	National Route 163	Northbound exit, southbound entrance; entrance ramp includes the Mini Morishoji Parking Area
Moriguchi	10.2	6.3	12-08	Moriguchi	Osaka Prefecture Route 155	
Moriguchi	10.6	6.6	–	Moriguchi	Kinki Expressway – to Meishin Expressway, Daini Keihan Expressway, Kadoma, Suita	
Moriguchi	10.8	6.7	12-09	Moriguchi	National Route 1 (Neyagawa Bypass)	Northern terminus; highway continues as the Neyagawa Bypass
1.000 mi = 1.609 km; 1.000 km = 0.621 mi: Incomplete access; Route transition
