= Japan National Route 308 =

National highway in Japan

National Route 308
- 国道308号
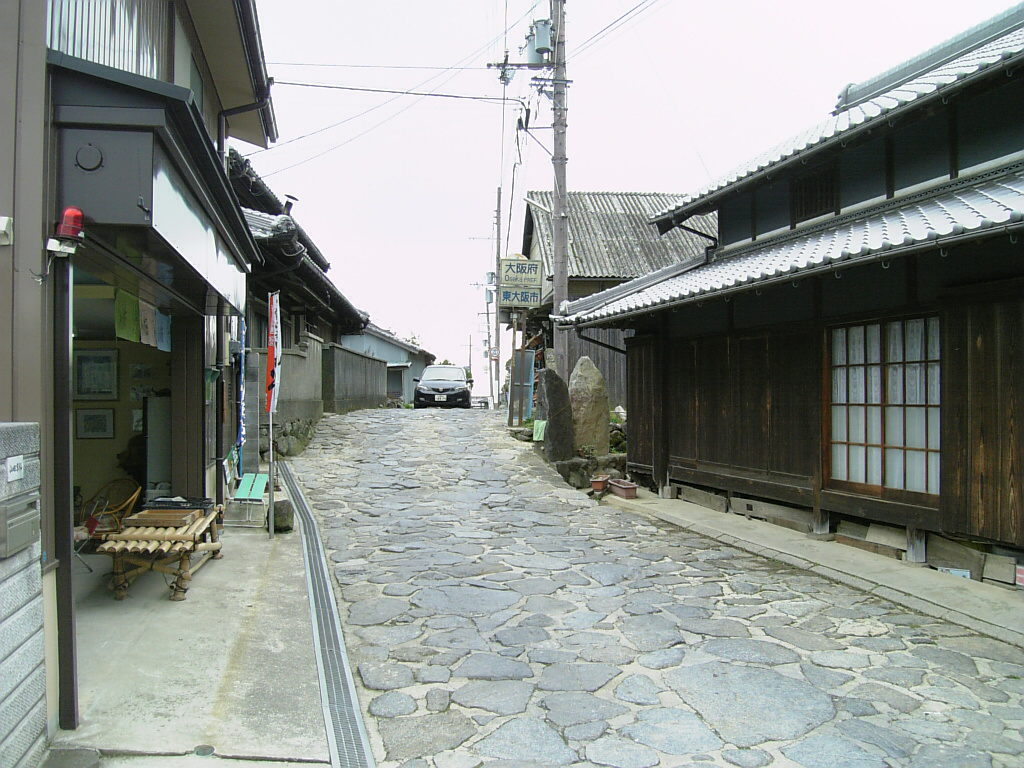

Route information
- Length: 32.9 km (20.4 mi)
- Existed: 1970–present

Major junctions
- west end: Chūō-ku, Osaka; Shimbashi Intersection (34°40′30.34″N 135°30′1.25″E)
- National Route 25(Concurrent with Route 26 and Route 165); National Route 479; Hanshin Expressway Route 13 Higashi-Osaka Line; Kinki Expressway; National Route 170; National Route 168; National Route 24 (connected with Keinawa Expressway)
- east end: Nara, Nara; Sanjō-ōji 2-chōme Intersection (34°40′54.76″N 135°48′1.21″E)

Location
- Country: Japan

Highway system
- National highways of Japan; Expressways of Japan
← National Route 307	→ National Route 309

National Route 308 (国道308号, Kokudō Sanbyaku-hachi-gō) is a national highway of Japan connecting Chūō-ku, Osaka and Nara, with a total length of 32.9 kilometers (20.44 mi).

== Route description ==
- Length: 32.9 km (20.44 mi)
- Origin: Chūō-ku, Osaka (originates at junction with Route 25)
- Terminus: Nara city (originates at junction with Route 24)
- Major cities: Higashiōsaka and Ikoma

== Intersects with ==
=== Osaka Prefecture ===
- Route 25
- Route 26
- Route 165
- Route 170

=== Nara Prefecture ===
- Route 168
- Route 24
