= Neyagawa Municipal Board of Education =

Neyagawa Municipal Board of Education is a department of the city of Neyagawa in Osaka Prefecture, Japan.

Neyagawa BoE operates public elementary and junior high schools.

== Schools ==
=== Junior high schools ===
- Neyagawa 1st Junior High School
- Neyagawa 2nd Junior High School
- Neyagawa 3rd Junior High School
- Neyagawa 4th Junior High School
- Neyagawa 5th Junior High School
- Neyagawa 6th Junior High School
- Neyagawa 7th Junior High School
- Neyagawa 8th Junior High School
- Neyagawa 9th Junior High School
- Neyagawa 10th Junior High School
- Nakakida Junior High School
- Tomorogi Junior High School

=== Elementary schools ===
- Horimizo Elementary School
- Ikeda Elementary School
- Ishizu Elementary School
- Kamida Elementary School
- Keimei Elementary School
- Kida Elementary School
- Koya Elementary School
- Kunimatsu Midorigaoka Elementary School
- Kusune Elementary School
- Mii Elementary School
- Neyagawa Central Elementary School
- Neyagawa 5th Elementary School
- Neyagawa East Elementary School
- Neyagawa North Elementary School
- Neyagawa South Elementary School
- Neyagawa West Elementary School
- Meiwa Elementary School
- Sakura Elementary School
- Seibi Elementary School
- Shimeno Elementary School
- Tai Elementary School
- Umegaoka Elementary School
- Utani Elementary School
- Wako Elementary School
