= Matsubara Route =

Expressway in Osaka, Japan

Hanshin Expressway Route 14 Matsubara Route 阪神高速14号松原線
- The Matsubara Route highlighted in red

Route information
- Maintained by Hanshin Expressway Company, Limited
- Length: 12.1 km (7.5 mi)
- Existed: 1970–present

Major junctions
- North end: Ebisu Junction in Chūō-ku, Osaka; Loop Route
- * National Route 479 * National Route 309 * Yamatogawa Route
- South end: Matsubara Junction in Matsubara; Nishi-Meihan Expressway; Kinki Expressway / Hanwa Expressway

Location
- Country: Japan

Highway system
- National highways of Japan; Expressways of Japan

The Matsubara Route (松原線, Matsubara-sen), signed as Route 14, is one of the tolled routes of the Hanshin Expressway system serving the Keihanshin area in Kansai, Japan. It travels in a northwest to southeast direction from the Chūō ward of Osaka, beginning at a junction with the Loop Route, to a junction with the Hanwa Expressway, Kinki Expressway, and Nishi-Meihan Expressway in the city of Matsubara. The expressway has a total length of 12.1 kilometers (7.5 mi).

== Route description ==
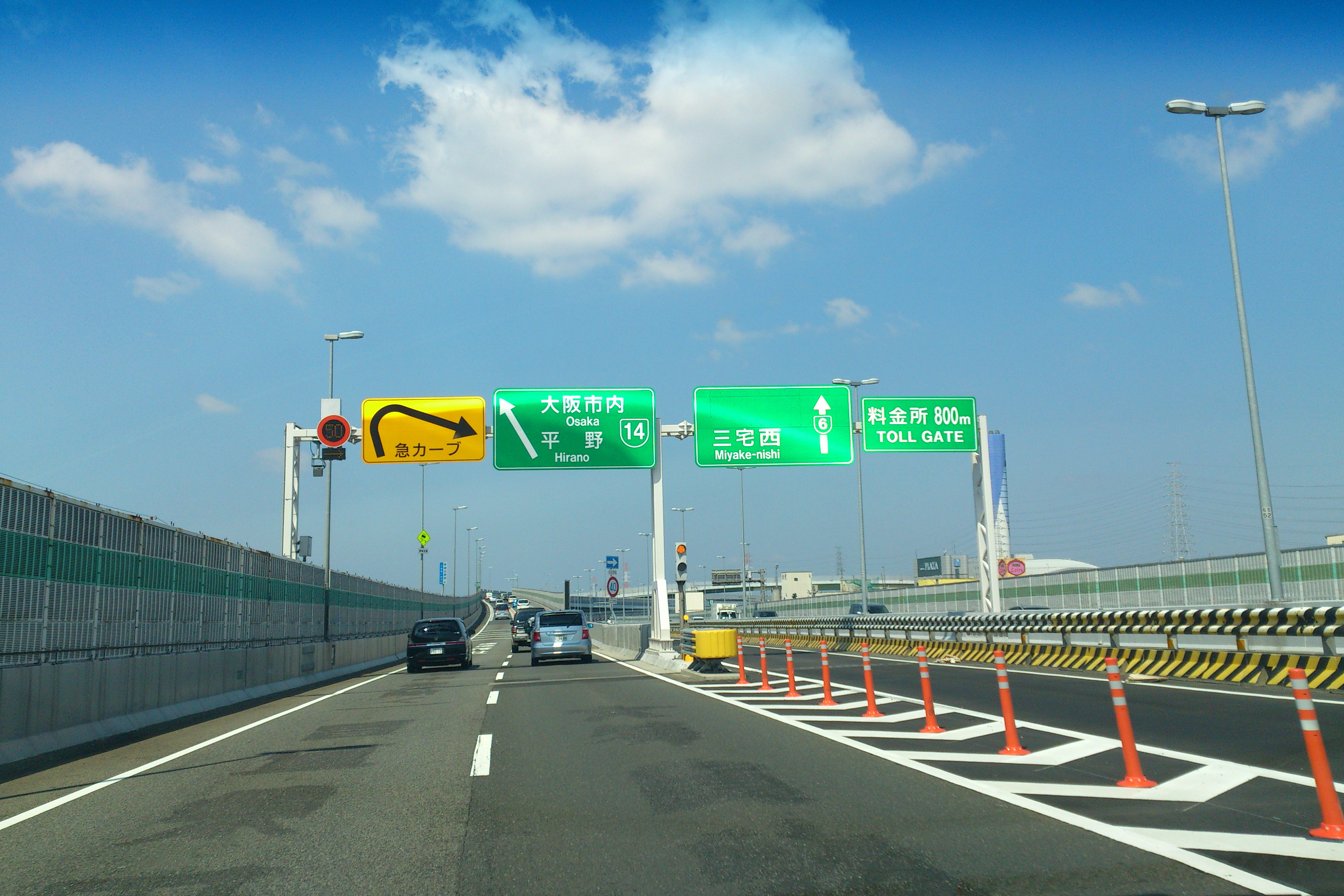
The Matsubara Route at Miyake Junction

The Matsubara Route travels in a northwest to southeast direction from the Chūō ward of Osaka, beginning at a junction with the Loop Route, to a junction with the Hanwa Expressway, Kinki Expressway, and Nishi-Meihan Expressway in the city of Matsubara. Serving as the primary expressway route from central Osaka to Matsubara and points beyond in eastern Osaka Prefecture and Nara Prefecture, the highway winds its way through the wards of Osaka. Much of this section of the expressway lies above the Tanimachi Line of the Osaka Metro between Abeno Station and Kire-Uriwari Station. After crossing over the Yamato River into Matsubara, the expressway has a junction with Yamatogawa Route that parallels the river from the junction to its end near Osaka Bay. Before ending at the junction with the Hanwa Expressway, Kinki Expressway, and Nishi-Meihan Expressway, the expressway briefly crosses back into the city of Osaka before returning into Matsubara where the junction lies. The expressway has a total length of 12.1 kilometers (7.5 mi).

== History ==
The first section of the expressway near the Loop Route was completed in 1970. The majority of the expressway was completed by 1980 after the opening of an 11.2-kilometer-long (7.0 mi) section. A mini parking area once operated between Miyake and Matsubara junctions, it has since been removed. On 21 March 2013, the expressway was linked to the Yamatogawa Route at Miyake Junction.

== List of interchanges ==
The entire expressway lies within Osaka Prefecture.

Location	km	mi	Exit	Name	Destinations	Notes
Osaka	0.0	0.0	–	Ebisu	Loop Route – Namba	Northern terminus
Osaka	0.6	0.37	14-01	Tennōji	Unnamed city street – Tanimachi-9, Terada-chō, Harima-chō	Southbound exit only
Osaka	0.7	0.43	14-02	Abeno	Abiko-suji	Northbound entrance only
Osaka	3.2	2.0	14-03	Fuminosato	Abiko-suji – Tennōji Station, Nagai Park	Southbound entrance, northbound exit
Osaka	4.8	3.0	14-04	Komagawa	Nankō-dōri – Hirano, Nagai Park	Southbound exit, northbound entrance
Osaka	6.9	4.3	14-05	Hirano	National Route 479 (Uchikanjo Route) – Fukaebashi Station	Southbound entrance, northbound exit
Osaka	7.7	4.8	14-06	Kire-Uriwari	National Route 309 (Nagai-kōen-dōri) – Tondabayashi; National Route 479 (Uchikanjo Route) – Fukaebashi, Nankō	Southbound exit, northbound entrance
Osaka	9.2	5.7	–	Uriwari Toll Booth		Toll gate is for northbound traffic only
Matsubara	9.5	5.9	14-07	Miyake	National Route 309 (Miyake Shinmichi) – central Matsubara	Southbound exit, northbound entrance
Matsubara	10.1	6.3	–	Miyake	Yamatogawa Route – Miyake-nishi	Southbound entrance, northbound exit
Matsubara			–	Miyake Mini Parking Area		Closed
Osaka	11.4	7.1	14-08	Ōbori	Osaka Prefecture Route 179	Southbound exit, northbound entrance
Matsubara	12.1	7.5	–	Matsubara	Nishi-Meihan Expressway – Tenri; Kinki Expressway north / Hanwa Expressway south – to Minami-Hanna Road, Suita, Wakayama	Southern terminus; expressway continues as the Nishi-Meihan Expressway
1.000 mi = 1.609 km; 1.000 km = 0.621 mi: Closed/former; Incomplete access; Route transition
