= Mio (given name) =

- Gender: Female

Origin
- Origin: Japanese
- Meaning: Different meanings depending on the kanji used

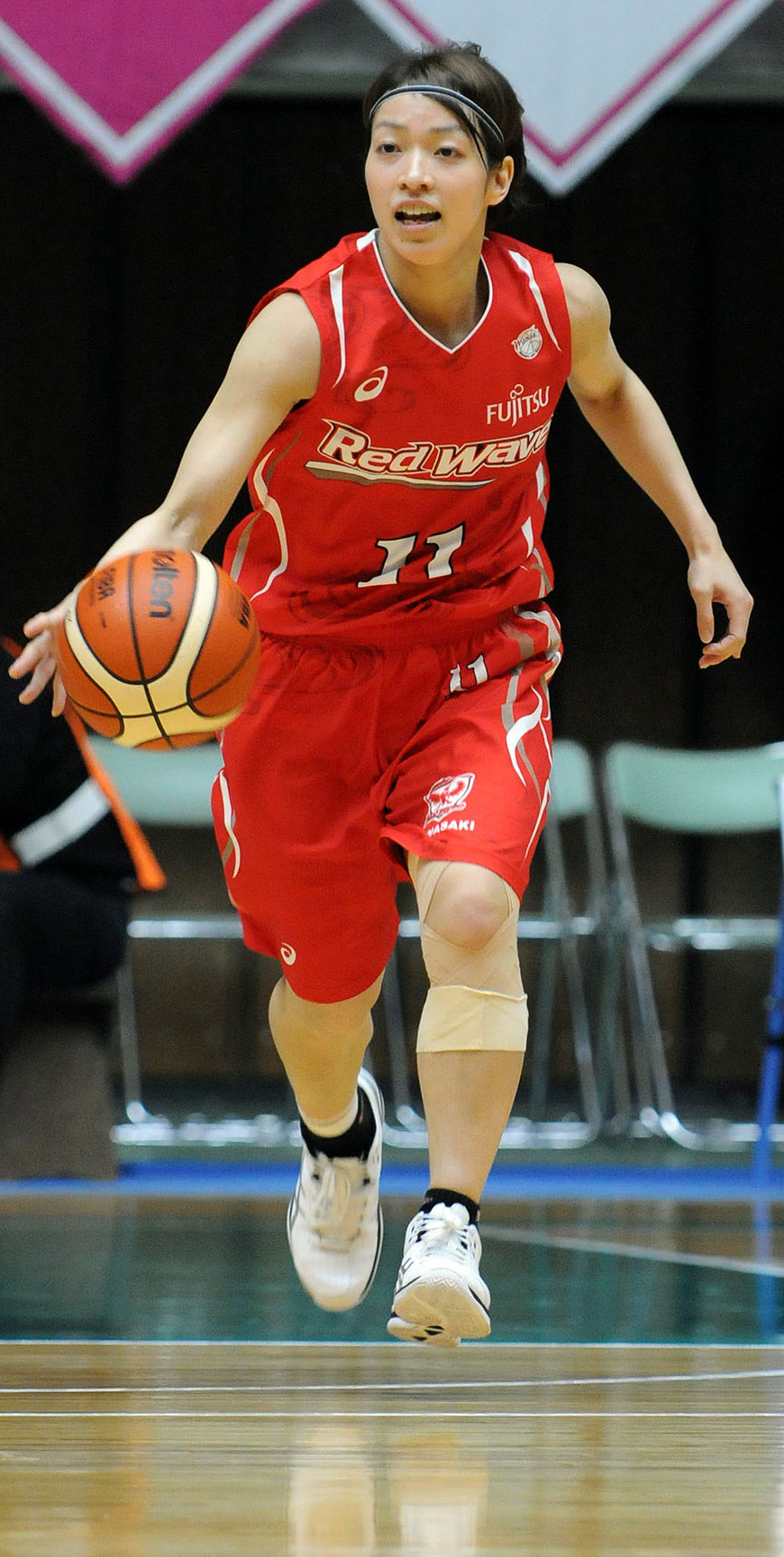
Mio Shinozaki playing basketball for the Fujitsu Red Wave in 2016

Mio is a feminine Japanese given name. It may refer to:

== People ==
- Mio Imada (今田 美桜; born 1997), Japanese model and actress
- Mio Isayama (諫山 実生; born 1980), Japanese singer
- Mio Kudo (工藤 美桜; born 1999), Japanese actress
- Mio Matsumura (松村 未央; born 1986), Japanese female announcer
- Mio Momono (桃野 美桜; born 1998), Japanese professional wrestler
- Mio Narita (成田 実生; born 2006), Japanese competitive swimmer
- Mio Otani (大谷 未央; born 1979), Japanese football player
- Mio Ootani (大谷 澪; born 1992), Japanese gravure idol
- Mio Satō (佐藤 澪; born 1993), Japanese actress, model and tarento
- Mio Shinozaki (篠崎 澪; born 1991), Japanese professional basketball
- Mio Shirai (紫雷 美央; born 1988), Japanese professional wrestler
- Mio Sugita (杉田 水脈; born 1967), Japanese politician
- Mio Takaki (高樹 澪; born 1959), Japanese actress and singer
- Mio Tomonaga (朝長 美桜; born 1998), Japanese idol, a member of HKT48
- Mio Tsumura (津村 澪; born 1995), Japanese kickboxer
- Mio Yamanaka (山中 美緒; born 1995), Japanese female rugby union player
- Mio Yoshizumi, former member of the Japanese girl group Kamen Rider Girls
- Mio Yūki (優希 美青; born 1999), Japanese actress, model and tarento

== Fictional characters ==
- Mio, protagonist of the book Mio, My Son by Astrid Lindgren and the film adaptation Mio in the Land of Faraway
- Mio, in the video game Grandia
- Mio, in the video game Xenoblade Chronicles 3
- Mio Akiyama, in the manga and anime series K-On!
- Mio Amakura, in the video game series Fatal Frame
- Mio Chibana, a main character in the manga series L'étranger
- Mio Honda, in the media franchise The Idolmaster
- Mio Ibuki, in the light novel series Classroom of the Elite
- Mio Kusakai, in the manga and anime series Keijo
- Mio Minato, in the anime series Aikatsu Friends!
- Mio Minato, in the tokusatsu series Ultraman R/B
- Mio Naganohara, a main character in the anime and manga series Nichijou
- Mio Naruse, in the light novel series The Testament of Sister New Devil
- Mio Natsume, in the tokusatsu series Ressha Sentai ToQger
- Mio Natsume, in the anime series Just Because!
- Mio Nishizono, in the visual novel Little Busters!
- Mio Ookami, a Japanese member of Hololive
- Mio Sakamoto, in the media franchise Strike Witches
- Mio Suzuki, in the tokusatsu series Kamen Rider Kiva, also known as the Pearlshell Fangire/Queen
- Mio Takamiya, in the light novel series Date A Live
- Mio Hudson, one of the two protagonists of the game Split Fiction
- Mio Kofune, in the manga and anime series Summer Time Rendering
