= E92 =

E92 may refer to:

- European route E92
- King's Indian Defense, Encyclopaedia of Chess Openings code
- Daini Hanna Road, route E92 in Japan

== See also ==
- BMW 3 Series (E90)
