= Osaka International College =

Coordinates: 34.7478°N 135.6035°E

- 大阪国際大学短期大学部
- Type: Private junior college
- Established: 1962
- Faculty: Life design
- Location: Moriguchi, Osaka, Japan
- Website: www.oiu.ac.jp/oic/

Osaka International College (大阪国際大学短期大学部, Ōsaka Kokusai Daigaku Tanki Daigakubu) is a private junior college in Moriguchi, Osaka, Japan.

== History ==
The school was founded in 1929 as Teikoku Kōtō Jogakkō (帝国高等女学校). It was chartered as a junior college in 1962 for women only. with the Department of Homemaking Studies. In April 2002, the junior college was renamed Osaka International College. In April 2008, the junior college became coeducational.

== Courses ==
It offers courses in life design, food nutrition, and childcare.

== See also ==
- Osaka International University
- List of junior colleges in Japan
