= Sawano =

Sawano (written: 澤野) is a Japanese surname. Notable people with the surname include:

- Daichi Sawano (澤野 大地, born 1980), Japanese pole vaulter
- Hiroyuki Sawano (澤野 弘之, born 1980), Japanese composer and musician
- Mizue Sawano (born 1941), Japanese painter
