= Moriguchi, Osaka =

Moriguchi 守口市
- City
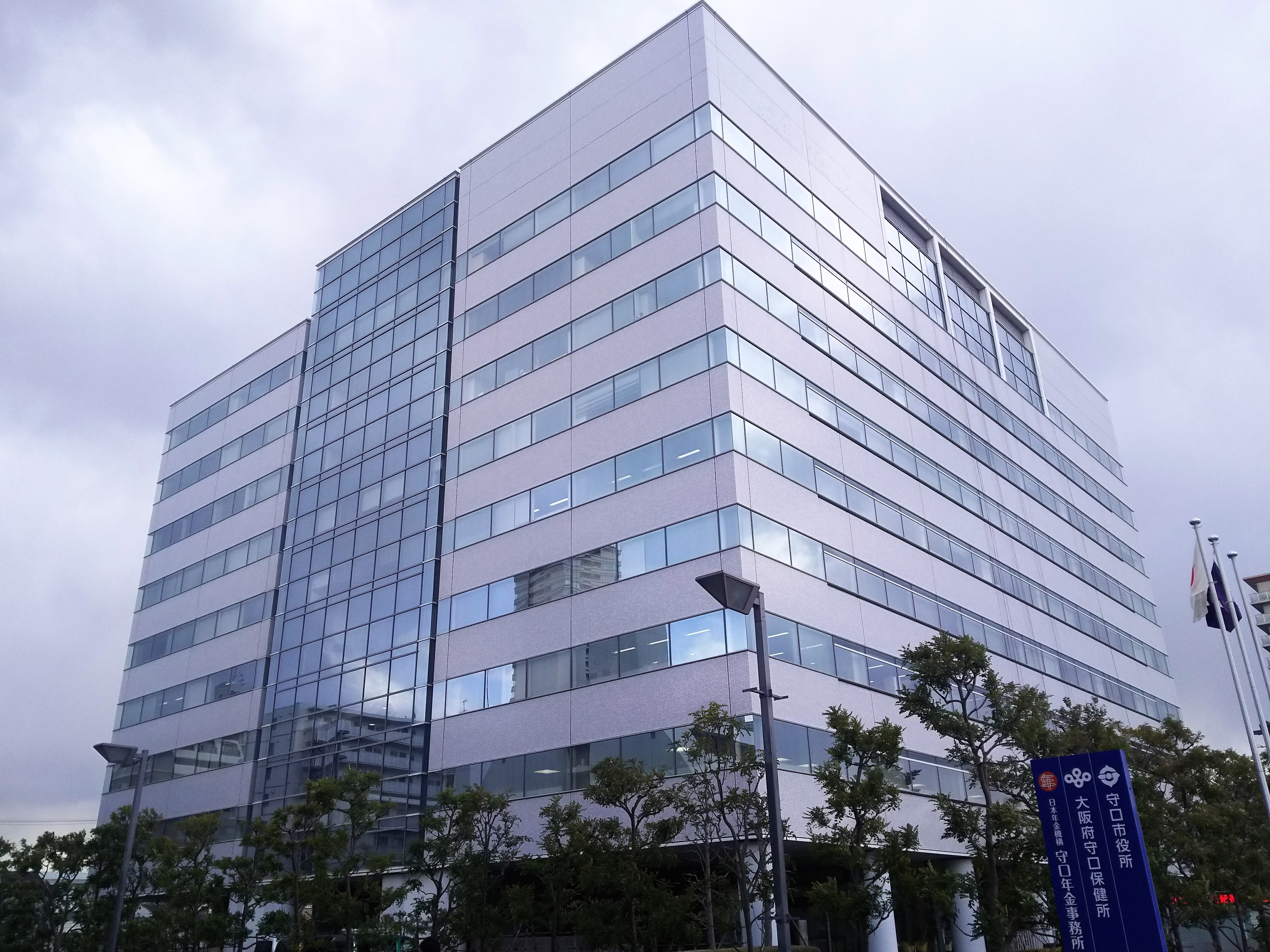
- Moriguchi city hall

- Flag Emblem

- Location of Moriguchi in Osaka Prefecture

- Location in Japan
- Coordinates: 34°44′15″N 135°33′51″E
- Country: Japan
- Region: Kansai
- Prefecture: Osaka

Government
  - Mayor: Katsuki Nishibata (since August 2011)

Area
  - Total: 12.71 km^{2} (4.91 sq mi)

Population (January 1, 2022)
  - Total: 142,655
  - Density: 11,220/km^{2} (29,070/sq mi)
- Time zone: UTC+09:00 (JST)
- City hall address: 2-2-5 Keihan-hondōri, Moriguchi-shi, Ōsaka-fu; 570-8666
- Website: Official website
- Symbols
- Flower: Rhododendron indicum
- Tree: Camphor laurel

Moriguchi (守口市, Moriguchi-shi) is a city located in Osaka Prefecture, Japan. As of 31 December 2021, the city had an estimated population of 142,655 in 73353 households and a population density of 11,000 persons per km^{2}. The total area of the city is 12.71 square kilometres (4.91 sq mi).

== Geography ==
Moriguchi borders the northeastern part of Osaka City and faces the Yodo River on the north. It is formed in a "U" shape around Kadoma City. Originally, there were many low-lying areas and many lotus root fields, but the area is now almost completely urbanized.

== Surrounding municipalities ==
Osaka Prefecture

- Kadoma
- Neyagawa
- Osaka (Asahi-ku, Higashiyodogawa-ku, Tsurumi-ku)
- Settsu

== Climate ==
Moriguchi has a humid subtropical climate (Köppen Cfa) characterized by warm summers and cool winters with light to no snowfall. The average annual temperature in Moriguchi is 15.6 °C. The average annual rainfall is 1475 mm with September as the wettest month. The temperatures are highest on average in August, at around 27.7 °C, and lowest in January, at around 4.2 °C.

== Demographics ==
Per Japanese census data, the population of Moriguchi rose rapidly to the 1970s, and has since started a slow decline.

Historical population
Year	Pop.	±%
1920	10,678	—
1930	19,433	+82.0%
1940	46,455	+139.1%
1950	65,932	+41.9%
1960	102,295	+55.2%
1970	184,466	+80.3%
1980	165,630	−10.2%
1990	157,372	−5.0%
2000	152,298	−3.2%
2010	146,554	−3.8%

== History ==
The area of the modern city of Moriguchi was within ancient Kawachi Province. The place name "Moriguchi" first appears in historical records in 1373. In the Edo Period, Moriguchi-juku was a post station on the Ōsaka Kaidō, an extension of the Tōkaidō between Kyoto and Kōraibashi in Osaka. The town of Moriguchi was established within Matta District with the creation of the modern municipalities system on April 1, 1889. On April 1, 1896 the area became part of Kitakawachi District, Osaka. The town of Izumi was created on April 1, 1933 by the merger of Kokufu, Gosho and Hakata. On November 1, 1946 Moriguchi merged with the town of Sango to form the city of Moriguchi.

== Government ==
Moriguchi has a mayor-council form of government with a directly elected mayor and a unicameral city council of 22 members. Moriguchi contributes one member to the Osaka Prefectural Assembly. In terms of national politics, the city is part of Osaka 6th district of the lower house of the Diet of Japan.

== Economy ==
Moriguchi is a satellite city to Osaka, with a large percentage of the local population commuting to the Osaka metropolis for work. The head offices and factory of Panasonic and its subsidiary Sanyo straddle the border of Moriguchi and neighboring Kadoma, which has attracted many there are many subcontracting parts companies.

== Education ==
Moriguchi has 13 public elementary schools, seven public middle schools and one combined elementary/middle school operated by the city government and three public high school operated by the Osaka Prefectural Department of Education. There are also three private high schools. The prefecture also operates one special education school for the handicapped. Three private colleges, Kansai Medical University, Osaka International College, and Osaka International University are located in Moriguchi.

== Transportation ==
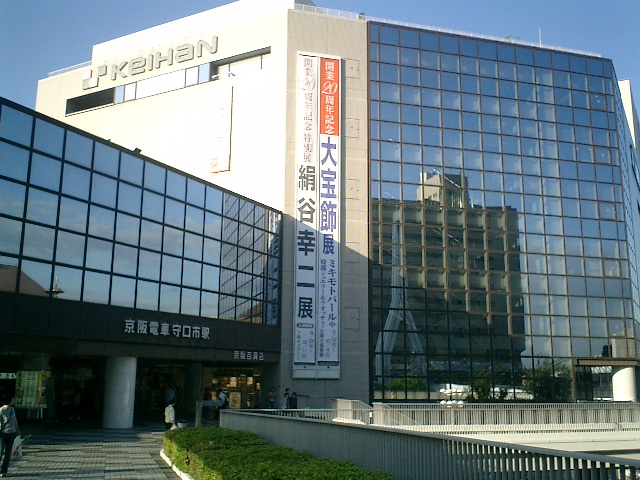
Keihan Moriguchi Station and Keihan department store

=== Railway ===
Keihan Electric Railway – Keihan Main Line

- Takii - Doi - Moriguchishi

Osaka Metro - Tanimachi Line

- Moriguchi - Dainichi

Osaka Monorail - Main Line

- Dainichi

=== Highway ===
- Kinki Expressway
- Hanshin Expressway Moriguchi Route
- National Route 1
- National Route 163
- National Route 479

== Sister cities ==
- Tōyō, Kōchi, Japan, friendship city agreement since 1981
- Takashima, Shiga, Japan, friendship city agreement since 1981 (with former Adogawa town)
- Katsuragi, Wakayama, Japan, friendship city agreement since 2005 (with former Hanazono town)
- New Westminster, British Columbia, Canada, sister city agreement since 1963
- Zhongshan, Guangdong, China, friendship city agreement since 1988

== Local attractions ==
- Moriguchi-juku

== Notable people from Moriguchi ==
- Ayaka, musician
- Ayumu Iwasa, racing driver
- Ryōji Morimoto, actor
- Mizue Sawano, painter
