= Daini Hanna Road =

Road in Japan

Daini Hanna Road
- 第二阪奈道路 (Daini Han'na dōro)

Route information
- Maintained by West Nippon Expressway Company
- Length: 13.4 km (8.3 mi)
- Existed: 1997–present

Major junctions
- West end: Nishiishikiri Ramp; Hanshin Expressway Higashi-Osaka Route in Higashiōsaka, Osaka
- East end: Hōrai Ramp; National Route 308 (Hanna Road) in Nara, Nara

Location
- Country: Japan

Highway system
- National highways of Japan; Expressways of Japan

The Daini Hanna Road (Japanese: 第二阪奈道路, romanized: Daini Hanna Dōro) is a toll road in Osaka and Nara prefectures. It serves as an alternate route to Japan National Route 308 under rather than over the Kuragari Pass. The road is managed by the West Nippon Expressway Company and is numbered E92 under the Ministry of Land, Infrastructure, Transport and Tourism's "2016 Proposal for Realization of Expressway Numbering."

== Route description ==
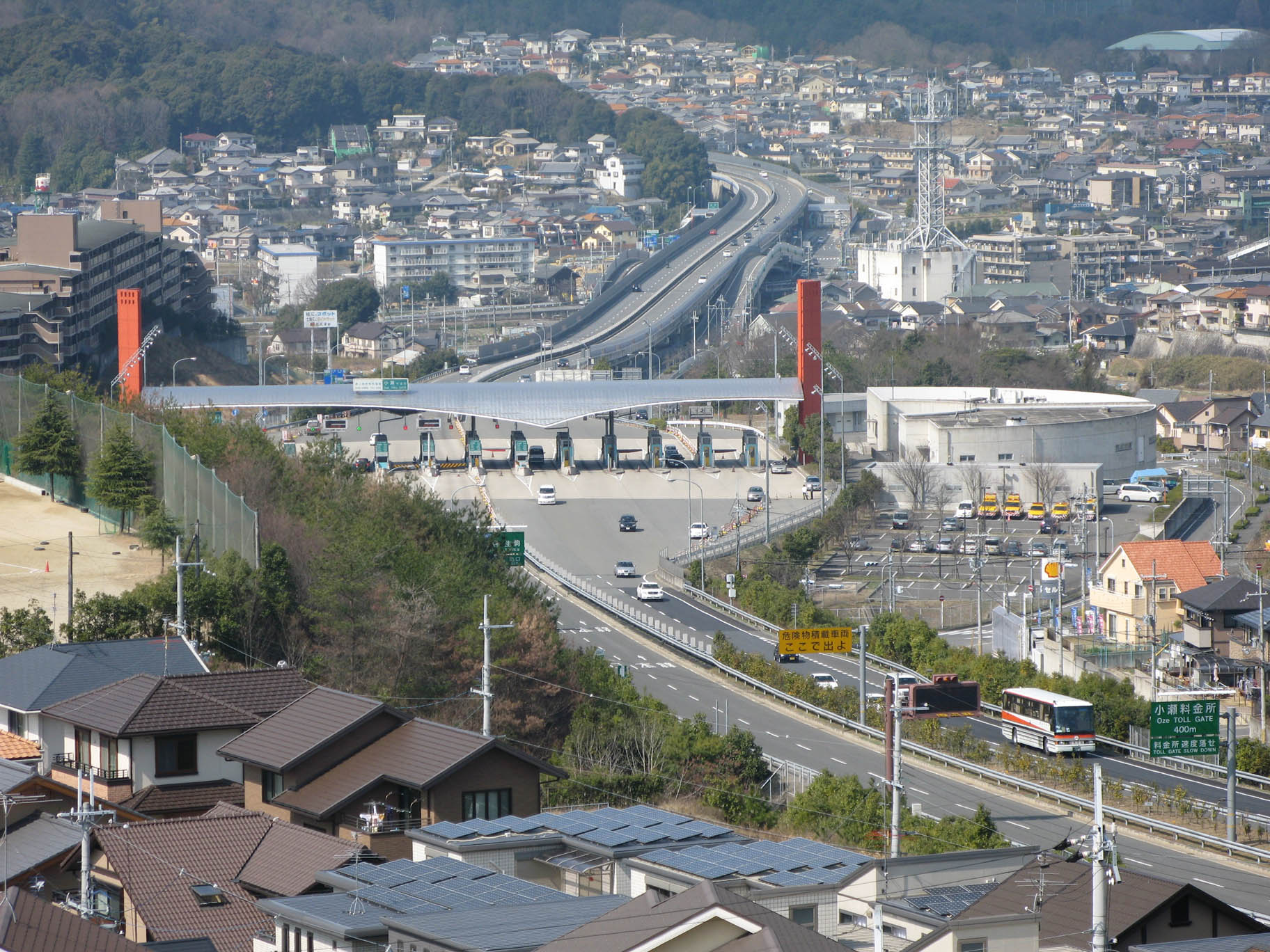
The Daini Hanna Road at Oze Toll Booth

The Daini Hanna Road begins in Higashiōsaka at the eastern terminus of the Higashi-Osaka Route of the Hanshin Expressway just west of the Keihanna Line's Shin-Ishikiri Station. Here the road is connected to Routes 170 and 308. The toll road then enters the Hanna Tunnel which makes up nearly half of the route. Halfway through the tunnel the road leaves Osaka Prefecture and enters Nara Prefecture. Emerging at the eastern end of the tunnel the toll road has a junction in Ikoma with Route 168 that is divided by a toll booth. Shortly after, the road passes through Muronoki Tunnel and into the city of Nara. The road has another junction and passes through another tunnel before coming to its eastern terminus at Route 308 (Hanna Road).

For the entire length of the toll road the speed limit is set at 60 km/h. The road features 2 lanes of traffic travelling in each direction.

== History ==
After opening, the Daini Hanna Road was managed by the Osaka and Nara Prefecture Road Corporations, but on 1 April 2019 the management of the road was transferred to the West Nippon Expressway Company.

== Junction list ==
TB= Toll booth

Prefecture	Location	km	mi	Exit	Name	Destinations	Notes
Through to Hanshin Expressway Higashi-Osaka Route
Osaka	Higashiōsaka	0	0.0	–	Nishiishikiri	National Route 170 / National Route 308 (Hanna Road)	Western terminus; eastbound entrance, westbound exit
Kuragari Pass		0.18 5.76	0.11 3.58	Hanna Tunnel; under the Kuragari Pass, marking the Osaka–Nara border Tank vehicles that carry hazardous materials (explosives, flammables, combustibles) are prohibited here			
Nara	Ikoma	6.1	3.8	–	Ichibu	National Route 168 (Ichibu Bypass)	Eastbound exit, westbound entrance
Nara	Ikoma	7.5	4.7	TB	Oze		
Nara	Ikoma	7.6	4.7	–	Oze	National Route 168 (Ichibu Bypass) Ōji, Ikoma	Eastbound entrance, westbound exit
Nara	Muronoki Pass	8.27 8.83	5.14 5.49	Muronoki Tunnel; under the Muronoki Pass, marking the border between Ikoma and Nara			
Nara	Nara	10.5	6.5	–	Nakamachi	Unnamed road	Eastbound exit, westbound entrance
Nara	Nara	12.55– 12.85	7.80– 7.98	Hōrai Tunnel			
Nara	Nara	13.4	8.3	–	Hōrai	National Route 308 (Hanna Road) / Nara Prefecture Route 1 (Nara–Ikoma Route)	Eastern terminus; eastbound exit, westbound entrance
1.000 mi = 1.609 km; 1.000 km = 0.621 mi: Incomplete access

== See also ==
- Japan National Route 308
- West Nippon Expressway Company
