= Japan National Route 169 =

Road in Japan

National Route 169
- 国道169号
- Japan National Route 169 highlighted in red
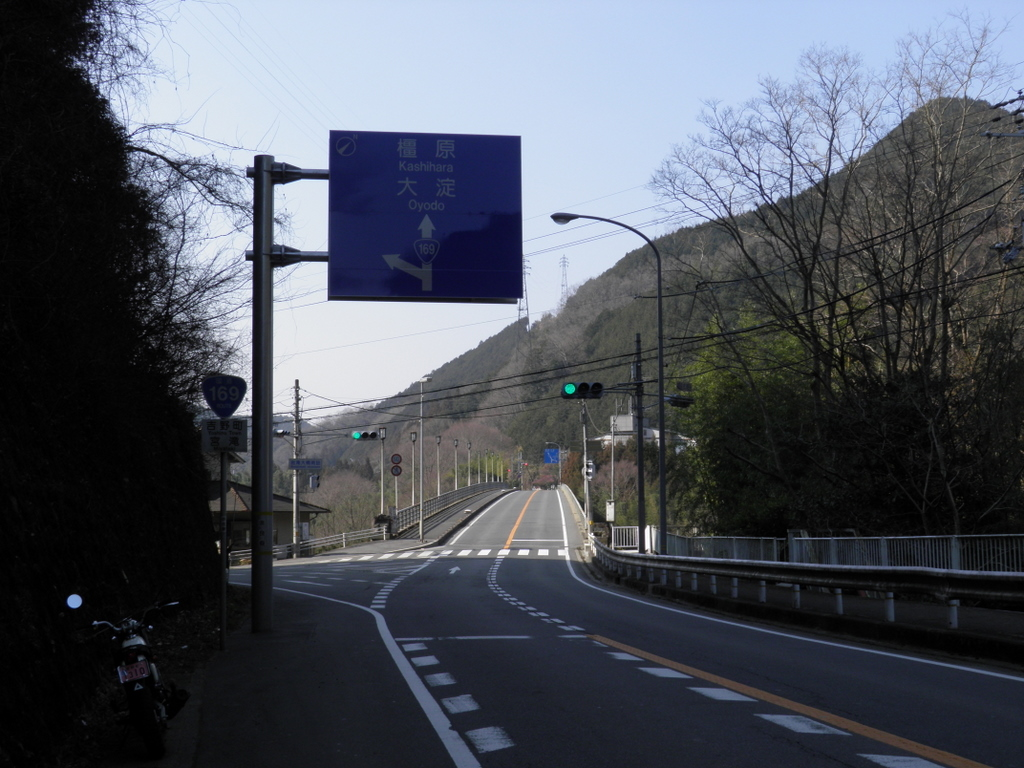

Route information
- Length: 184.6 km (114.7 mi)
- Existed: 1953–present

Major junctions
- North end: National Route 369 / Prefectural Road 104 in Nara, Nara
- South end: National Route 42 in Shingū, Wakayama

Location
- Country: Japan

Highway system
- National highways of Japan; Expressways of Japan
← National Route 168	→ National Route 170

National Route 169 is a national highway of Japan connecting Nara, Nara and Shingū, Wakayama in Japan, with a total length of 184.6 km (114.71 mi).

== History ==
National Route 169 was originally designated on 18 May 1953 as a second-class national highway connecting the now dissolved town, Kinomoto, in Mie Prefecture to Yamatotakada, Nara.
