= Ishinohōden Kofun =

Kofun burial mound in Neyagawa, Kansai, Japan

- 石宝殿古墳 (Japanese)
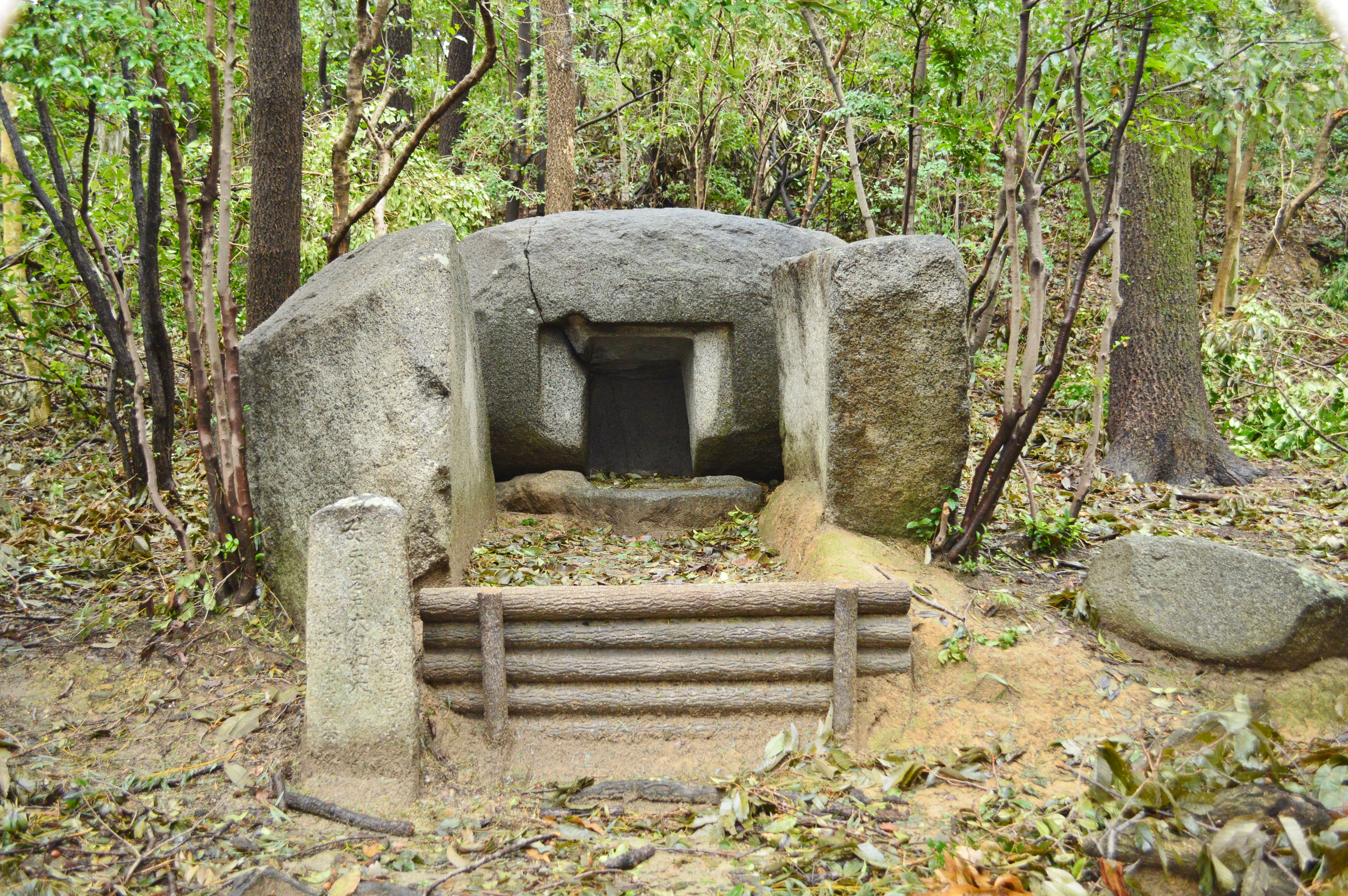
- Ishinohōden Kofun, front view

- Ishinohōden Kofun Ishinohōden Kofun (Japan)
- Interactive map of Ishinohōden Kofun
- 34°45′8.92″N 135°39′30.52″E
- Type: Kofun
- Periods: Kofun period
- Location: Neyagawa, Osaka, Japan
- Region: Kansai region

History
- Built: c.7th century

Site notes
- Public access: Yes (No facilities)

The Ishinohōden Kofun (石宝殿古墳) is a Kofun period burial mound, located in the Uchiage Motomachi neighborhood of the city of Neyagawa, Osaka in the Kansai region of Japan. The tumulus was designated a National Historic Site of Japan in 1973.

== Overview ==
The Ishinohōden Kofun is a zenpō-kōen-fun (前方後円墳), which is shaped like a keyhole, having one square end and one circular end, when viewed from above. It is located an elevation of 100 meters, on a gently sloping hill at the western foot of Mount Ikoma. The mound has been completely eroded away, leaving behind the stone burial chamber with a base stone of 2.7 meters by 1.6 meters and a ceiling stone of 3.2 meters by 3.3 meters. It is highly unusual in that it is made of two monoliths of granite which have been hollowed out to form a room inside, rather than being made stacked slabs of stones. The interior is 0.9 meters wide, 0.8 meters high and 2.2 meters deep, and the entrance is 0.5 meters wide. There are round dents on the upper and lower surfaces on the left side of the entrance, and it is believed that these were a door. Two more large megaliths are arranged outside to form an entry portico, orientated to the south. The kofun is located on the grounds of a Shinto shrine, the Kora Jinja.

Three megaliths are lined up in a row behind the tumulus, and an archaeological survey conducted in 1988 confirmed that more stones continue underground to the west. The angle of these stones is 135 degrees, and if these correspond to the outer line of the burial mound, the configuration of the tumulus may have been octagonal.

This tumulus is presumed to have been built around the middle of the 7th century (at the end of the Kofun period) from a small fragment of Sue ware pottery which was found at the site, and is believed to have been an octagonal-shaped structure. It is mentioned in Edo Period records, but no modern archaeological excavations or surveys have been conducted. As the burial chamber has been open for centuries, there are no documented grave goods; however, Edo period documents indicate that a gold-copper burial vessel containing white bones was excavated from near the tumulus. Its whereabouts are now unknown.

The site is about a 15-minute walk from Neyagawakōen Station on the JR West Katamachi Line.

== Gallery ==
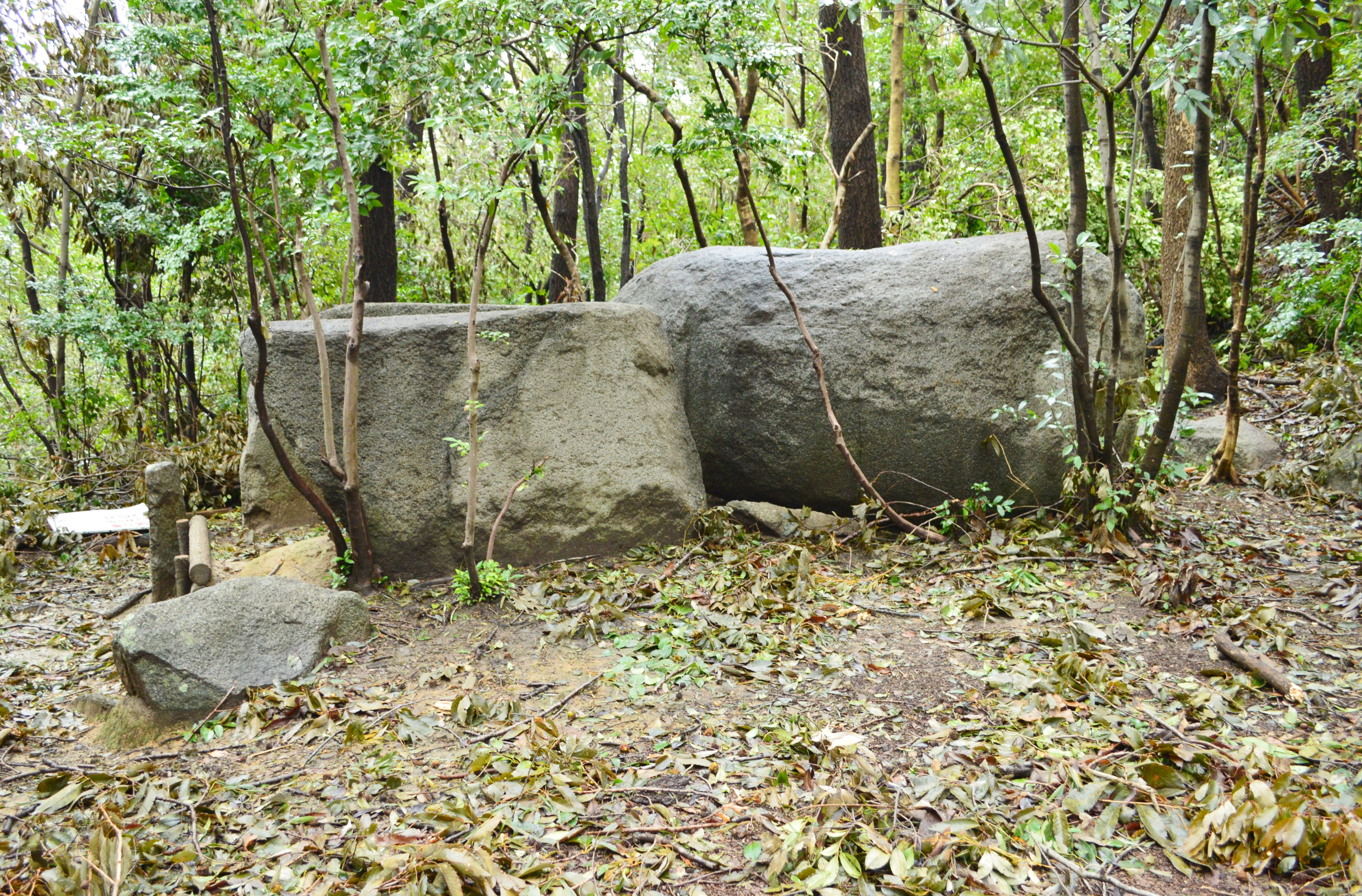
Side View

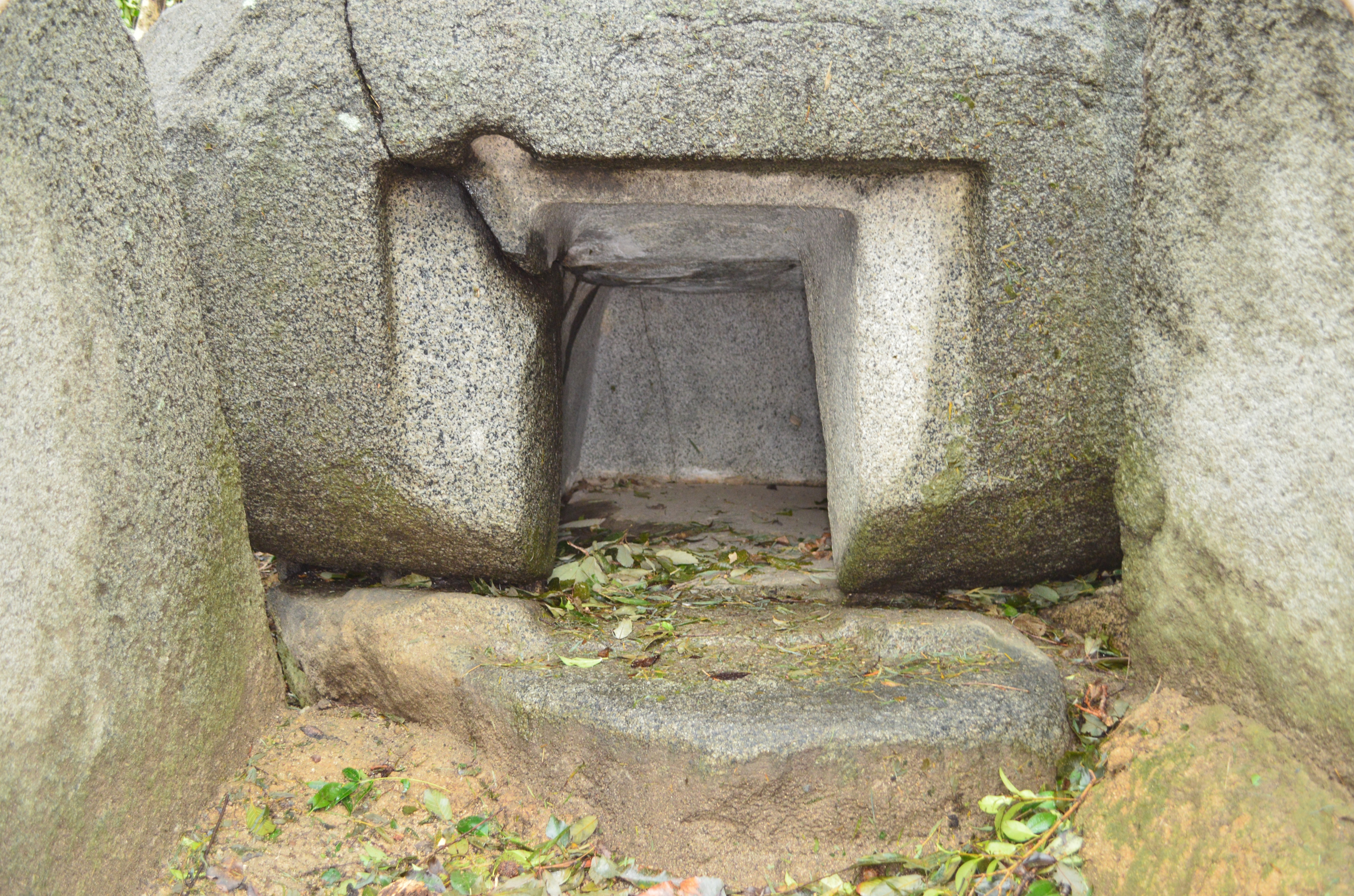
Entry to the Burial Chamber

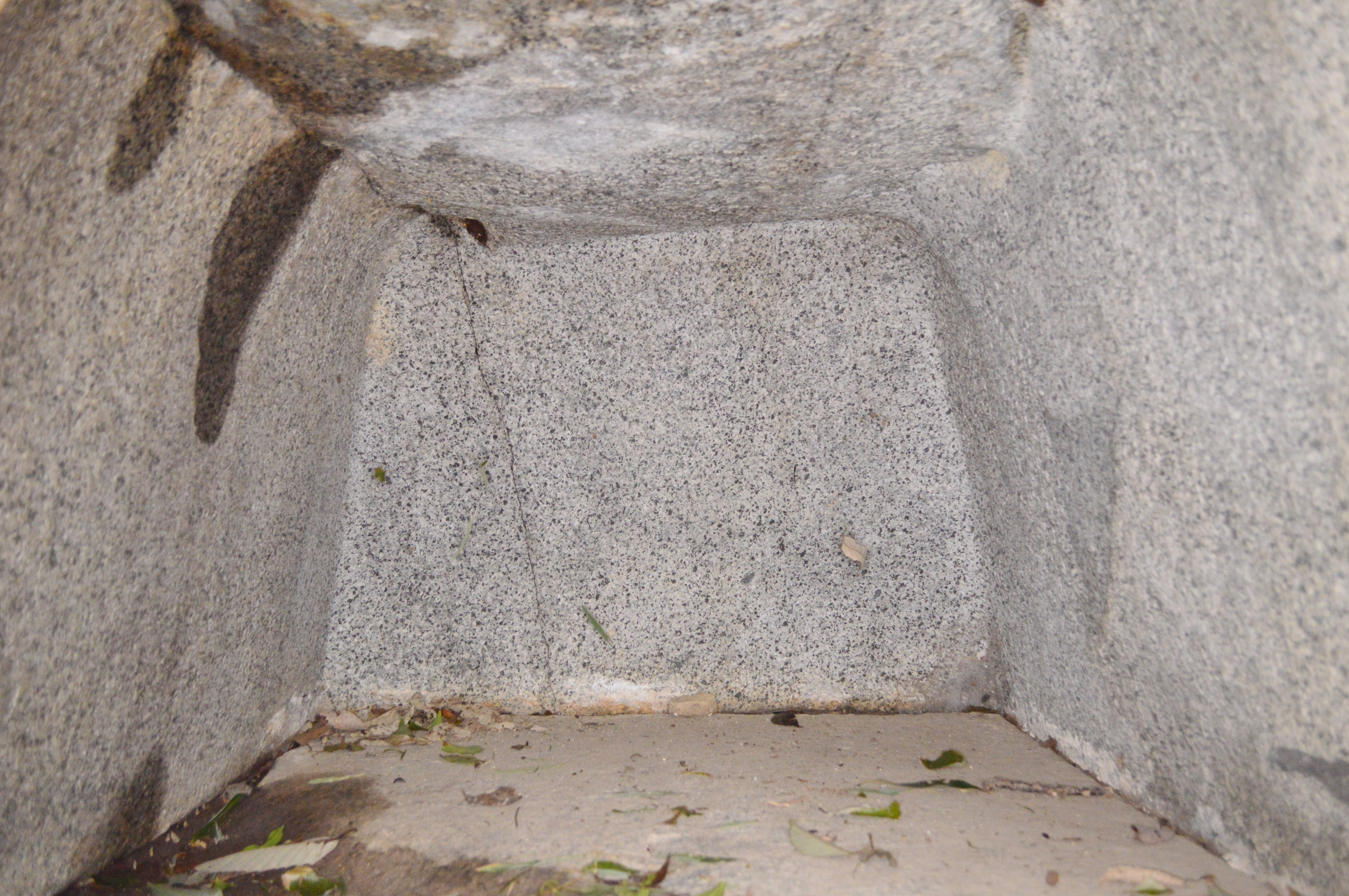
Inside the Burial Chamber

== See also ==
- List of Historic Sites of Japan (Osaka)
