= Naoto Tsuru =

Japanese baseball player

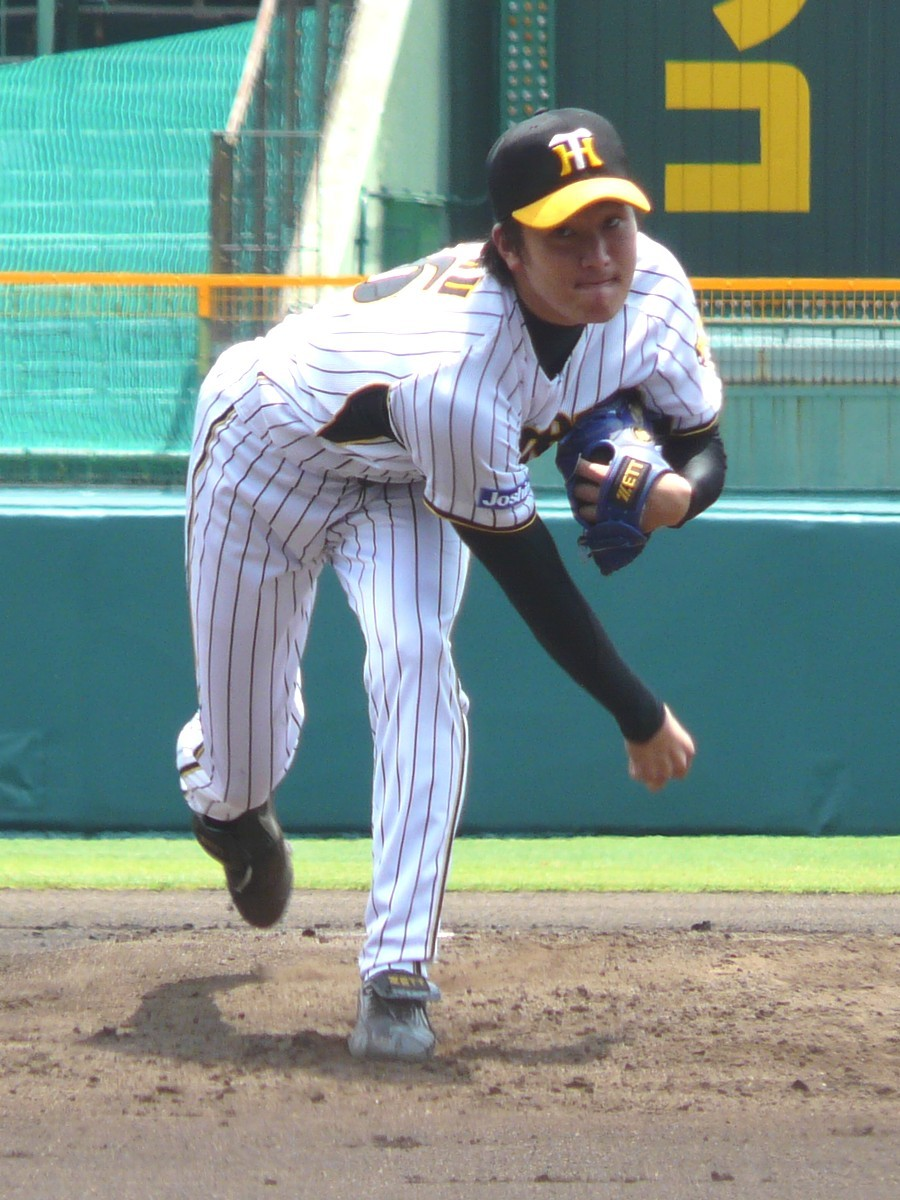
- Tsuru with the Hanshin Tigers
- Pitcher
- Born: April 26, 1991 (age 34); Neyagawa, Osaka, Japan
- Bats: Left Throws: Right

NPB debut
- 2008, for the Hanshin Tigers

NPB statistics (through 2016)
- Win–loss record: 9–8
- ERA: 3.80
- Strikeouts: 126
- Stats at Baseball Reference

Teams
- Hanshin Tigers (2008–2016)

Naoto Tsuru (鶴 直人, Tsuru Naoto; born April 25, 1987 in Neyagawa, Osaka) is a Japanese former professional baseball pitcher in Japan's Nippon Professional Baseball. He played for the Hanshin Tigers from 2008 to 2016.
