= Yamatogawa Route =

Expressway connecting the Osaka and Kobe areas

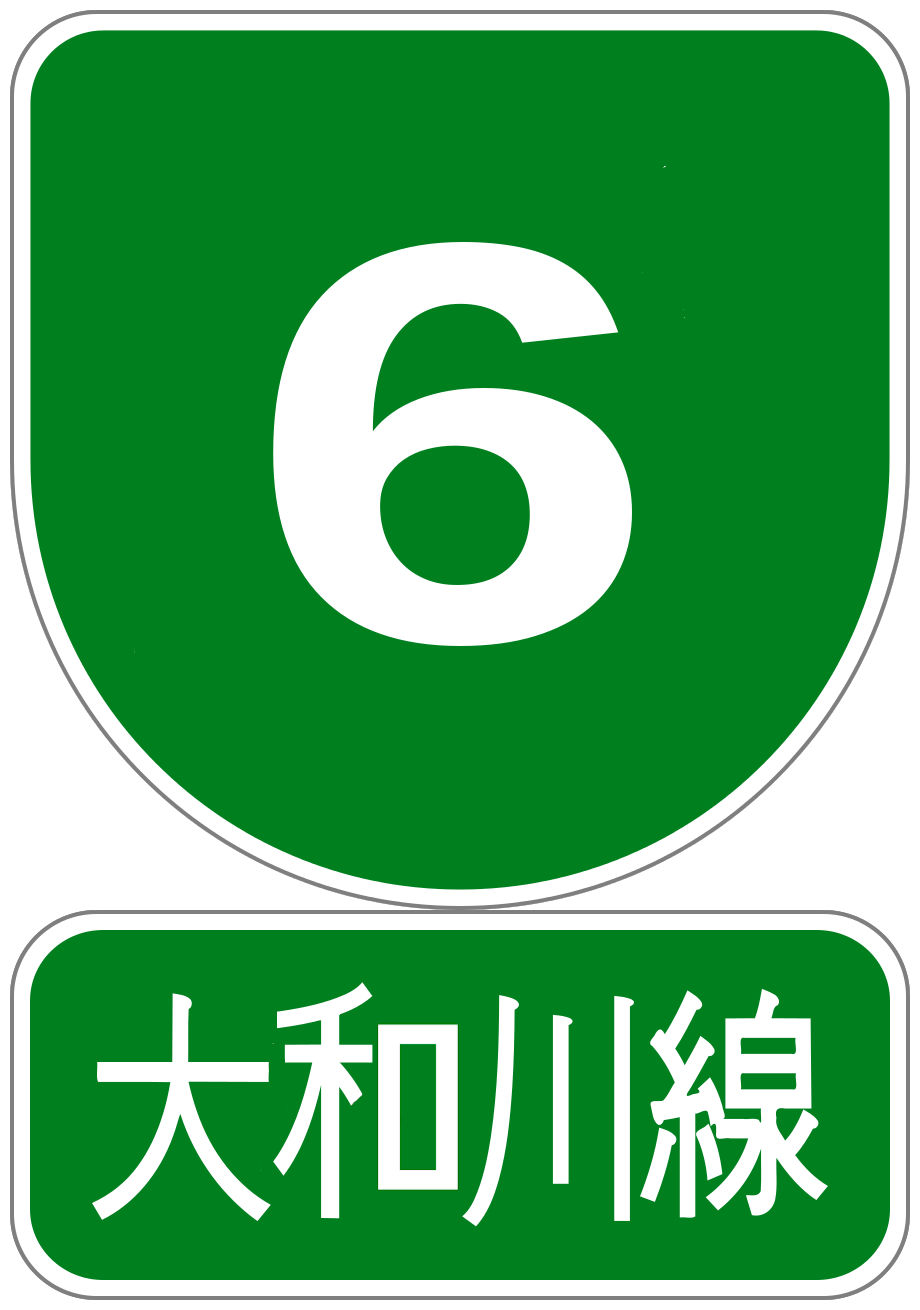
Hanshin Expressway Route 6 Yamatogawa Route 阪神高速6号大和川線
- The Yamatogawa Route highlighted in red

Route information
- Maintained by Hanshin Expressway Company, Limited
- Length: 9.7 km (6.0 mi)
- Existed: 2013–present

Major junctions
- West end: Sanpō Junction in Sakai; Bayshore Route
- East end: Miyake Junction in Matsubara; Matsubara Route

Location
- Country: Japan

Highway system
- National highways of Japan; Expressways of Japan

The Yamatogawa Route (大和川線, Yamatogawa-sen), signed as Route 6, is one of the routes of the Hanshin Expressway system serving the Keihanshin area in Kansai, Japan. It travels in a west to east direction in Osaka Prefecture, from the Bayshore Route, in Sakai to the Matsubara Route in Matsubara, with a total length of 9.7 kilometers (6.0 mi).
