= Second Keihan Highway =

Road in Japan

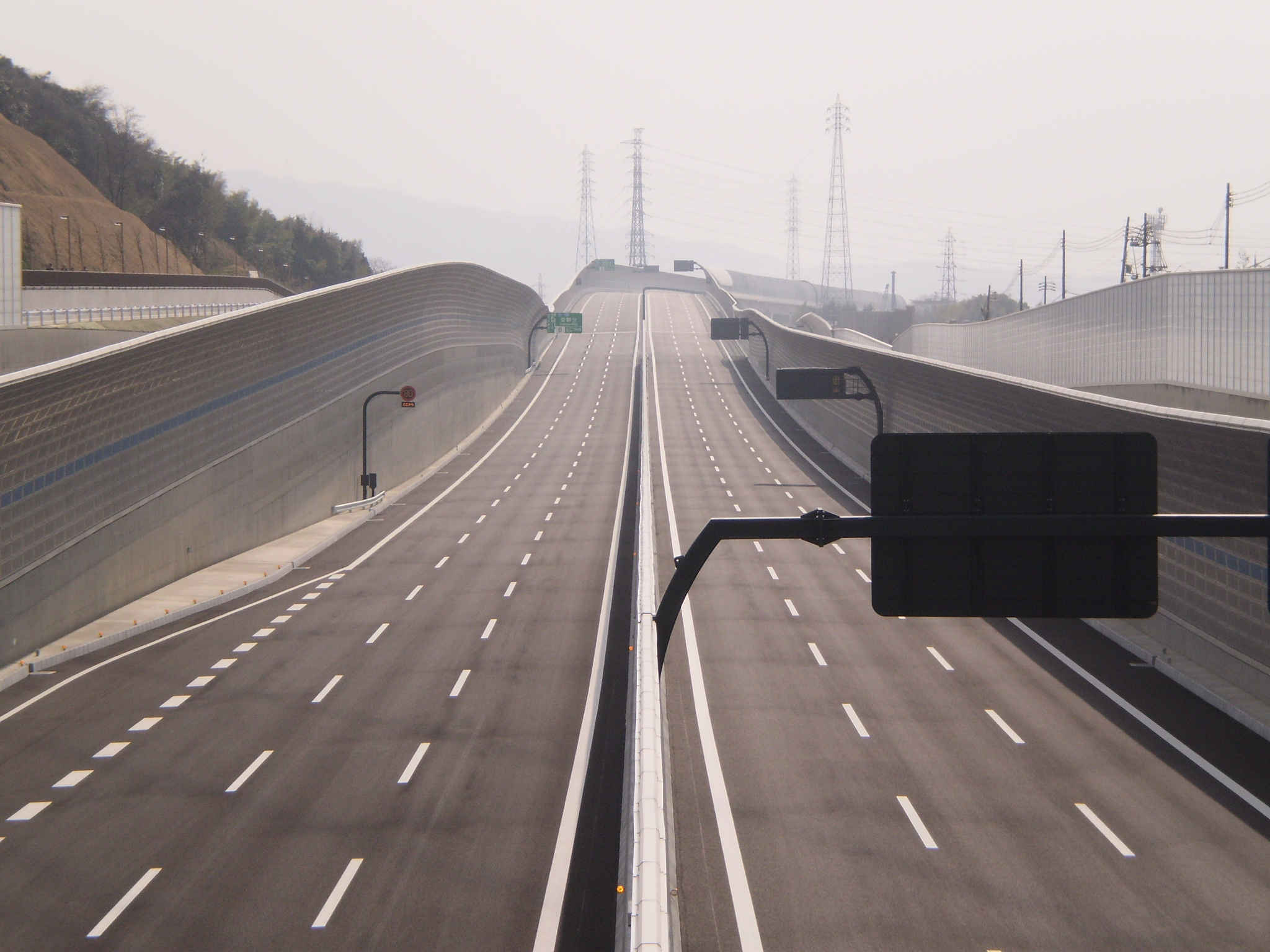
Second Keihan Highway around Hirakata City

The Second Keihan Highway (第二京阪道路, Daini Keihan Dōro), also called as Daini-Keihan Road, is a national highway and 6-laned Regional High-Standard Highways (expressway) in Japan, leading from Fushimi-ku, Kyoto through Kansai Science City to Kadoma, Osaka. This road is a bypass of Japan National Route 1.

== Expressway part ==
Daini Keihan Road
- 国道1号
- 第二京阪道路

Route information
- Maintained by West Nippon Expressway Company
- Length: 35.7 km (22.2 mi)
- Existed: 2003–present
- Component highways: National Route 1

Major junctions
- North end: Kamogawa-nishi IC in Minami-ku, Kyoto
- South end: Kadoma Junction; Kinki Expressway in Kadoma, Osaka

Location
- Country: Japan

Highway system
- National highways of Japan; Expressways of Japan

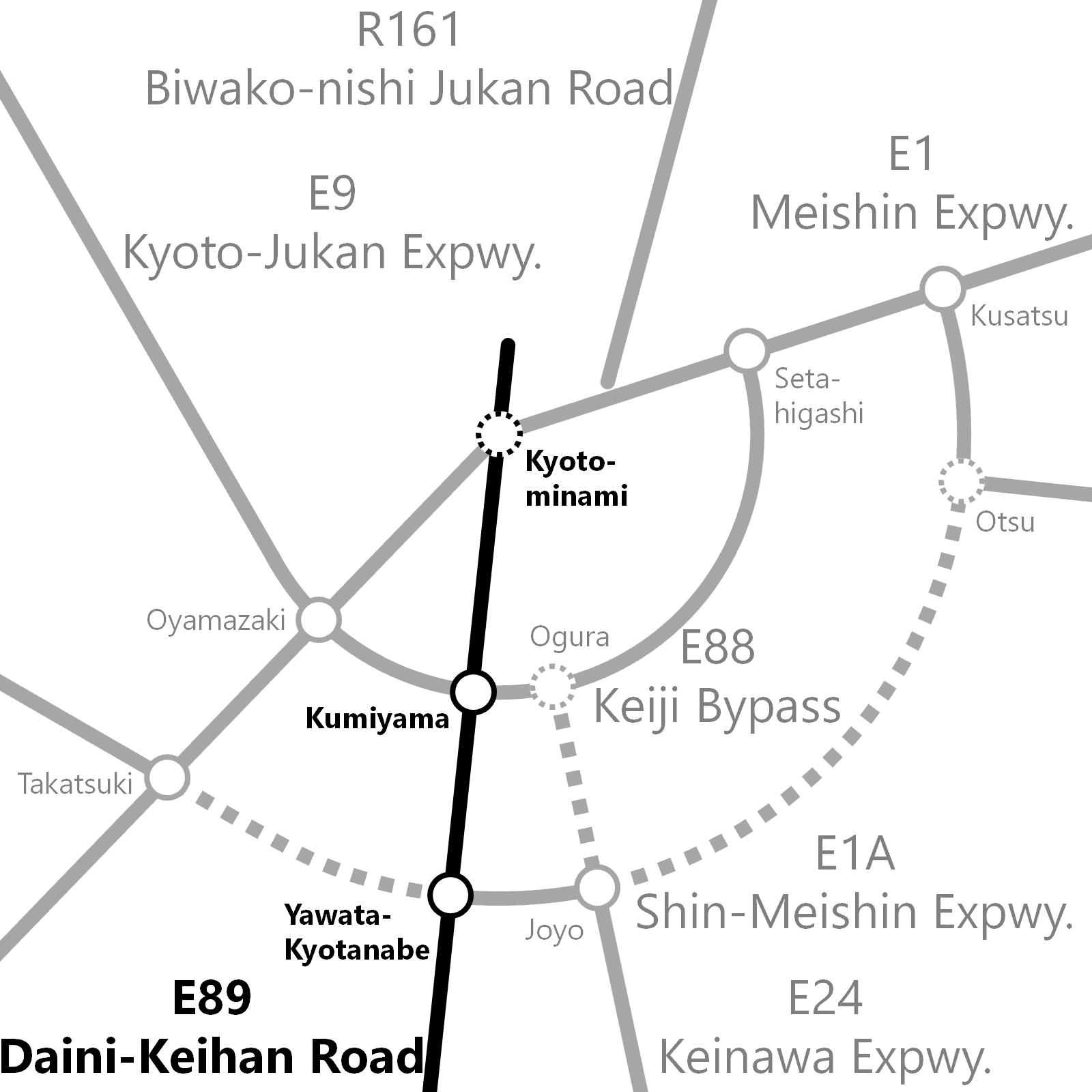
Map of Daini-Keihan Road (black) and expressways (gray) around Kyoto City. Roads and junctions under planning are shown by dotted lines.

This expressway is officially referred to as the Second Keihan Highway and the Rakunan Connecting Highway (洛南連絡道路, Rakunan Renraku Dōro). It is signed E89 under Ministry of Land, Infrastructure, Transport and Tourism's "2016 Proposal for Realization of Expressway Numbering." The length of this road is 35.7 km.

=== Interchanges and features ===
- IC - interchange, SIC - smart interchange, JCT - junction, SA - service area, PA - parking area, BS - bus stop, CB - snow chains, TN - tunnel, BR - bridge, TB - Toll Gate

Prefecture	Location	km	Exit	Name	Connections	Bus stop	Notes
Through to Inariyama Tunnel bound for Yamashina
Kyoto	Fushimi-ku, Kyoto	0.0	8-02	Kamogawa-higashi IC		–	
Kyoto	Minami-ku, Kyoto	0.6	—	Kamogawa-nishi TB		–	
Kyoto	Minami-ku, Kyoto	0.6	8-03	Kamogawa-nishi IC	National Route 24	–	
Kyoto	Minami-ku, Kyoto	2.2	8-04	Kamitoba IC		–	
Kyoto	Fushimi-ku, Kyoto			Kyoto-minami JCT	Meishin Expressway		Planned Interchange
Kyoto	Fushimi-ku, Kyoto	2.7	8-06	Jonangu-kita IC		–	
Kyoto	Fushimi-ku, Kyoto	4.0	8-07	Jonangu-minami IC		–	
Kyoto	Fushimi-ku, Kyoto	5.4	8-08	Fushimi IC	Kyoto Pref. Route 35 (Otsu-Yodo Route)	–	
Kyoto	Fushimi-ku, Kyoto	7.9	—	Oguraike TB		-	
Kyoto	Fushimi-ku, Kyoto	8.3	1	Oguraike IC		–	
Kyoto	Kumiyama	9.4	2	Kumiyama JCT	Keiji Bypass	-	
Kyoto	Kumiyama	12.2	3	Kumiyama-minami IC	Kyoto Pref. Route 15 (Uji-Yodo Route)	-	
Kyoto	Yawata	12.9	4	Yawata-higashi IC	Kyoto Pref. Route 22 (Yawata-Kizu Route)	-	
Kyoto	Yawata	16.1	4-1	Yawata-Kyotanabe JCT	Shin-Meishin Expressway	-	
Kyoto	Kyotanabe	16.4	5	Kyotanabe TB/Kyotanabe Matsui IC		-	
Kyoto	Kyotanabe	17.2	—	Kyotanabe PA/BS		S	
Osaka	Hirakata	18.8	6	Hirakata-higashi IC	National Route 307; Osaka Pref. Route 17 (Hirakata-Takatsuki Route)	-	
Osaka	Hirakata	20.4	7	Hirakata Gakken IC		-	
Osaka	Katano	22.0	8	Katano-kita IC	Osaka Pref. Route 7 (Hirakata-Yamatokōriyama Route)	-	
Osaka	Hirakata	25.9	9	Katano-minami IC	National Route 168; Osaka Pref. Route 20 (Hirakata-Tondabayashi-Izumisano Route)	-	
Osaka	Neyagawa	26.8	10	Neyagawa-kita IC		-	
Osaka	Neyagawa		—	Neyagawa Shoji Tunnel		-	Length - 780m
Osaka	Neyagawa	31.5	11	Neyagawa-minami IC		-	
Osaka	Kadoma	34.8	12	Daini Keihan Kadoma IC	Osaka Pref. Route 2 (Osaka Center Circular Route); Osaka Pref. Route 15 (Yao-Ibaraki Route)	-	
Osaka	Kadoma	35.7	-	Kadoma TB		-	
Osaka	Kadoma	35.7	3-1	Kadoma JCT	Kinki Expressway	-	

== Highway Part ==
The length of this road is 29.7 km.
