= Mizue Sawano =

Japanese artist

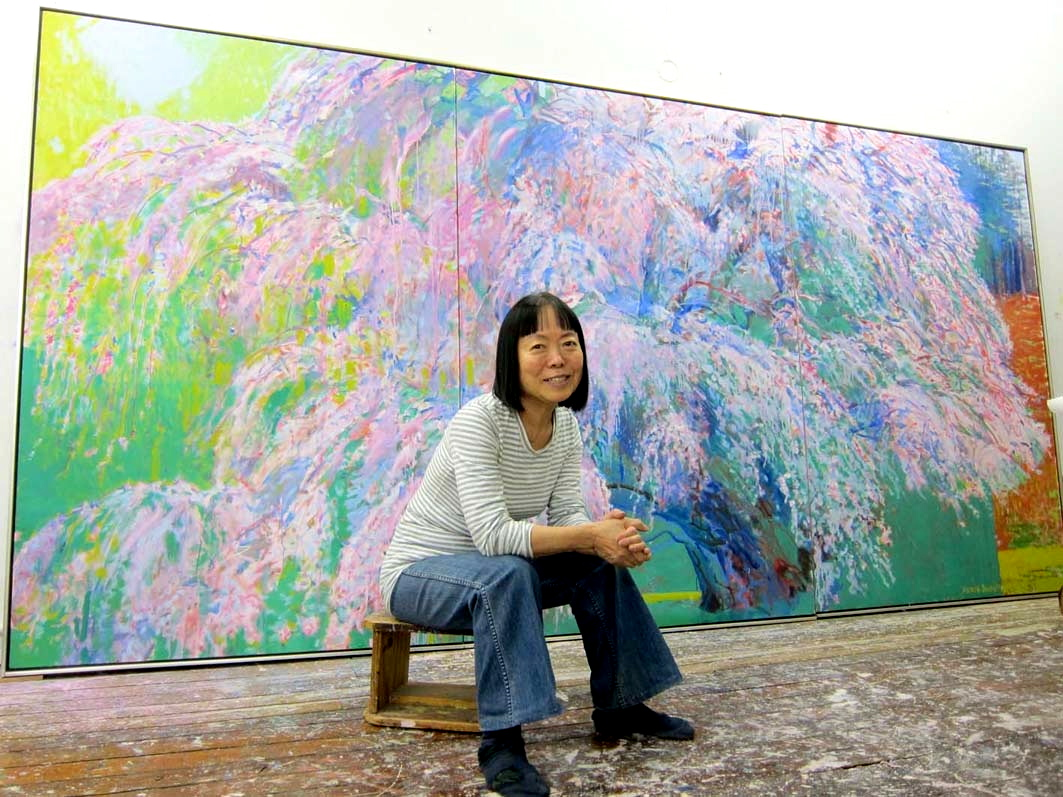
- Born: 1941 (age 84–85); Moriguchi, Osaka Prefecture
- Education: B.A. in Fine Arts
- Alma mater: Tokyo National University of Fine Arts and Music
- Website: mizuesawano.com

Mizue Sawano (born 1941) is a Japanese artist, most recognized for her paintings of water lilies and cherry blossoms.

== Early life ==
Born 1941, in Moriguchi, Osaka Prefecture. Her father, Hisao was a novelist and journalist with Asahi newspapers. At eleven, Sawano was awarded a gold medal for an oil painting of a still life at an exhibition of students' art at the Tokyo Metropolitan Art Museum. She was accepted at Tokyo National University of Fine Arts and Music in 1961. The devastating Postwar Japan situation forced the family to move around the countryside before settling in Tokyo when Sawano was seventeen.
