= Ōsakakō Route =

Expressway in the Osaka area

Hanshin Expressway Route 16 Ōsakakō Route 阪神高速16号大阪港線
- The Ōsakakō Route highlighted in red

Route information
- Maintained by Hanshin Expressway Company, Limited
- Length: 7.2 km (4.5 mi)
- Existed: 1974–present

Major junctions
- East end: Nishisenba Junction in Chūō-ku; Loop Route
- West end: Nankō Junction in Suminoe-ku; Bayshore Route

Location
- Country: Japan

Highway system
- National highways of Japan; Expressways of Japan

The Ōsakakō Route (大阪港線, Ōsakakō-sen), signed as Route 16, is one of the routes of the Hanshin Expressway system serving the Keihanshin area. It is a radial route that travels in an east to west direction from central Osaka, to Suminoe-ku, with a total length of 7.2 kilometers (4.5 mi).
