= Neyagawa =

Neyagawa 寝屋川市
- Core city
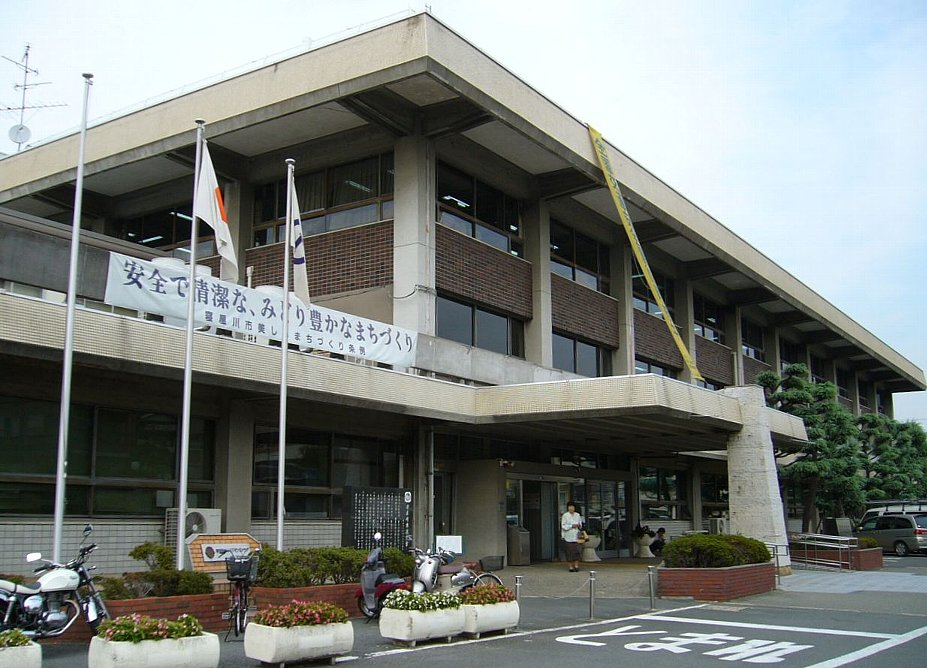
- Neyagawa City Hall

- Flag Seal

- Location of Neyagawa in Osaka Prefecture

- Location in Japan
- Coordinates: 34°46′N 135°38′E
- Country: Japan
- Region: Kansai
- Prefecture: Osaka

Government
  - Mayor: Keisuke Hirose (広瀬 慶輔) (from May 2019)

Area
  - Total: 24.70 km^{2} (9.54 sq mi)

Population (March 1, 2022)
  - Total: 228,802
  - Density: 9,263/km^{2} (23,990/sq mi)
- Time zone: UTC+09:00 (JST)
- City hall address: 1-1 Honmachi, Neyagawa-shi, Ōsaka-fu 572-8555
- Website: Official website
- Symbols
- Flower: Rose
- Tree: Sakura

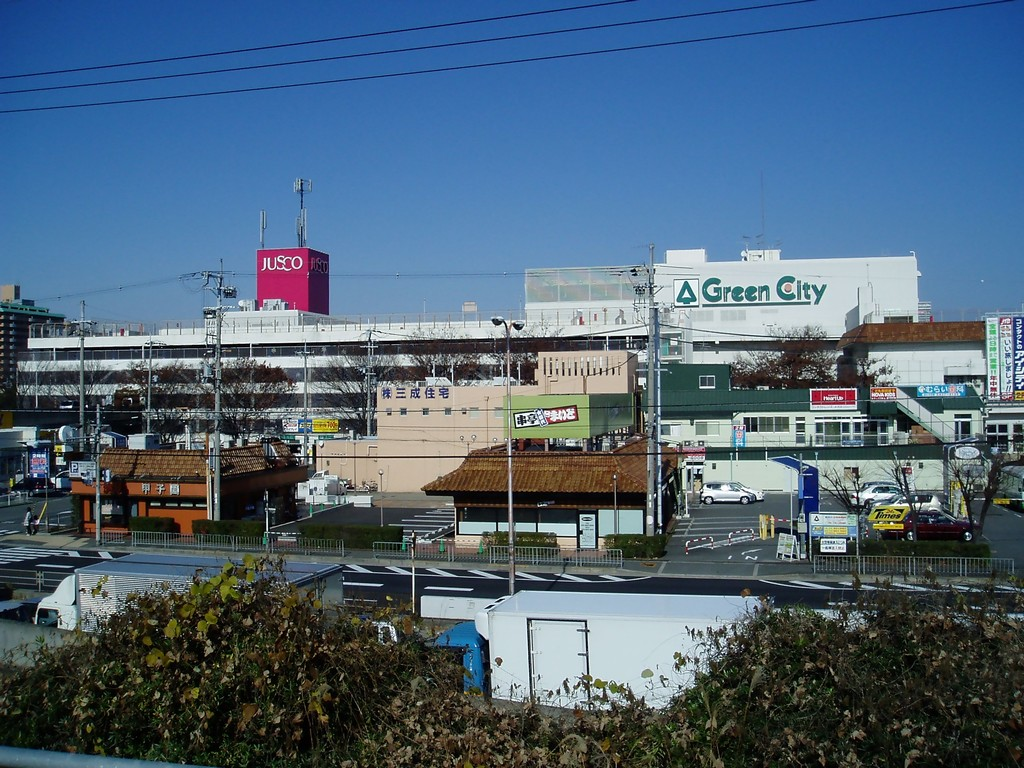
Neyagawa Green City

Neyagawa (寝屋川市, Neyagawa-shi) is a city located in Osaka Prefecture, Japan. As of 1 March 2022, the city had an estimated population of 228,802 in 111,545 households and a population density of 9,300 persons per km^{2}. The total area of the city is 24.70 square kilometres (9.54 sq mi).

== Geography ==
Neyagawa is located on the left bank of the Yodo River in the northeastern part of Osaka Prefecture, 15 km from the center of Osaka city and 35 km from the center of Kyoto city. It is 7.22 km north–south, 6.89 km east–west. The city's terrain can be broadly divided into eastern hills and western flatlands. The eastern hills are part of the Ikoma Mountains, about 50m above sea level, and the flat western part is mainly composed of alluvium and is 2 to 3m above sea level. The highest point is 109.6m around the Ishinohōden Kofun.

=== Neighboring municipalities ===
Osaka Prefecture

- Hirakata
- Kadoma
- Katano
- Moriguchi
- Settsu
- Shijōnawate
- Takatsuki

== Climate ==
Neyagawa has a humid subtropical climate (Köppen Cfa) characterized by warm summers and cool winters with light to no snowfall. The average annual temperature in Neyagawa is 15.1 °C. The average annual rainfall is 1475 mm with September as the wettest month. The temperatures are highest on average in August, at around 27.1 °C, and lowest in January, at around 3.7 °C.

== Demographics ==
Per Japanese census data, the population of Neyagawa increased extremely rapidly in the 1960s, leveled off until the 2000s and has slowly started to decrease.

Historical population
Year	Pop.	±%
1920	15,367	—
1930	18,576	+20.9%
1940	25,166	+35.5%
1950	34,492	+37.1%
1960	50,188	+45.5%
1970	206,961	+312.4%
1980	255,859	+23.6%
1990	256,524	+0.3%
2000	250,806	−2.2%
2010	238,244	−5.0%

== History ==
The area of the modern city of Neyagawa was within ancient Kawachi Province. The village of Kukasho was established within Matta District with the creation of the modern municipalities system on April 1, 1889. On April 1, 1896, the area became part of Kitakawachi District, Osaka. Kukasho was elevated to town status on February 1, 1943. On April 1, 1943, it was merged with the villages of Tomorogi, Toyono and Neyagawa to form the city of Neyagawa.

== Government ==
Neyagawa has a mayor-council form of government with a directly elected mayor and a unicameral city council of 24 members. Neyagawa contributes two members to the Osaka Prefectural Assembly. In terms of national politics, the city is part of Osaka 12th district of the lower house of the Diet of Japan.

== Economy ==
Neyagawa is a regional commercial center with some high manufacturing.

== Education ==
=== Universities and colleges ===
- Setsunan University
- Osaka Electro-Communication University

=== Primary and secondary education ===
Neyagawa has 24 public elementary schools and ten public middle schools operated by the city government and three public high schools operated by the Osaka Prefectural Department of Education. There is also one private elementary school and two private combined middle/high schools. The prefecture also operates one special education school for the handicapped and one technical school.

== Transportation ==
=== Railway ===
JR West – Katamachi Line (Gakkentoshi Line)

- Neyagawa-Kōen

Keihan Electric Railway - Keihan Main Line

- Kayashima - Neyagawa-shi - Korien

=== Highway ===
- Second Keihan Highway: Neyagawa-kita IC - Neyagawa-minami IC
- National Route 1
- National Route 163
- National Route 170

== Sister cities ==
- Susami, Wakayama, Japan, friendship city agreement since 1976
- Mimasaka, Okayama, Japan, friendship city agreement since 1991 (with former Ohara town)
- Newport News, Virginia, United States, sister city agreement since 1982
- Oakville, Ontario, Canada, sister city agreement since 1984
- Luwan District, Shanghai, China, friendship city agreement since 1994. Luwan has since been merged into Huangpu District since June 2011.
- South Yarra, Victoria, Australia
- Sale, Victoria, Australia
- Traralgon, Victoria, Australia
- Warragul, Victoria, Australia
- Wilmette, Illinois, United States

== Local attractions ==
- Ishinohōden Kofun, National Historic Site

== Notable people from Neyagawa ==
- Gōeidō Gōtarō, sumo wrestler, ranked at ōzeki
- Masaki Okimoto, professional wrestler
- Nana Okada, Japanese idol, singer, member of J-pop girl group AKB48, former member of STU48
- Koji Uehara, baseball player, member of the 2013 World Series champion Boston Red Sox
- Yoshiyuki Fuchiwaki, former baseball player (Osaka Kintetsu Buffaloes, Nippon Professional Baseball)
- Yumi Yoshimura, Japanese idol, singer and musician, member of J-pop duo PUFFY
- Mio Ootani, Japanese gravure idol
- Ryo Tadokoro, Japanese football player (Yokohama FC, J1 League)
- Hiroshi Ōsaka, Japanese animator, character designer and illustrator
- Fujiwara, Japanese comedy duo
- Tomokatsu Kitagawa, Japanese politician
- Fumitake Fujita, Japanese politician
- Kaoru Tada, Japanese manga artist
- Naoto Tsuru, baseball player (Hanshin Tigers, Nippon Professional Baseball - Central League)
- Naoki Matayoshi, Japanese comedian, screenwriter, and novelist
- Yuri Nakamura, Zainichi Korean actress and former singer
- Daiki Numa, Japanese footballer (Vonds Ichihara, Kantō Soccer League)
- Emiko Ueno, former female badminton player
- Ura Kazuki, sumo wrestler
