= Osaka International University =

- 大阪国際大学
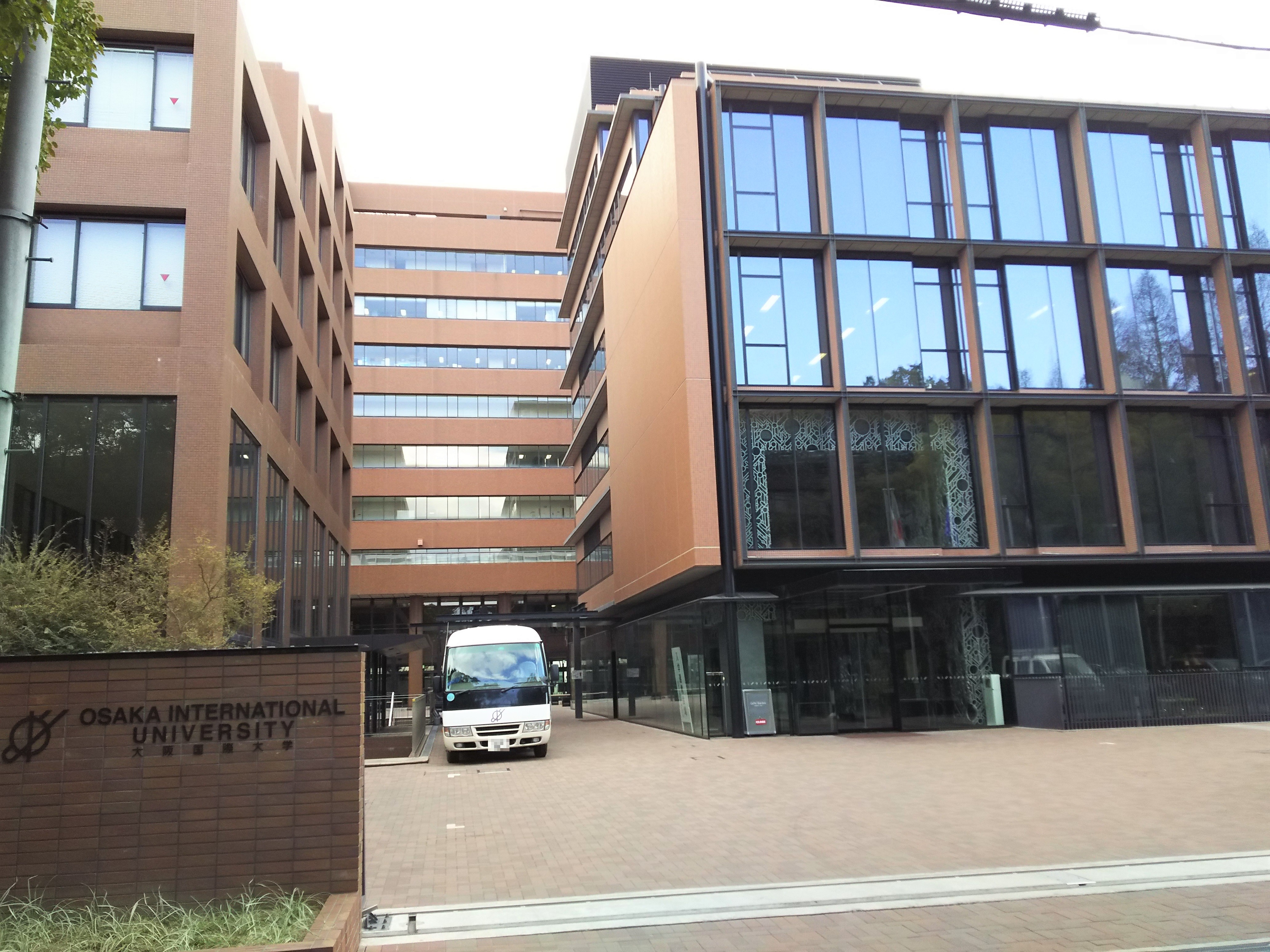
- Type: Private university
- Established: 1929
- Location: Moriguchi, Osaka Prefecture, Japan
- Campus: Moriguchi Campus 34°44′50.9″N 135°36′15.4″E Hirakata Campus 34°49′0.7″N 135°42′55.4″E
- Website: http://www.oiu.ac.jp/

Osaka International University (大阪国際大学, Ōsaka kokusai daigaku) is a private university with campuses in Moriguchi, Osaka and Hirakata, Osaka, Japan. The predecessor of the school was founded in 1929, and it was chartered as a university in 1988.

== Education ==
This university has following faculties and schools

- Faculty of Business Administration and Economics
  - Department of Business Administration
  - Department of Economics
- Faculty of International Liberal Arts
  - Department of International Communication
  - Department of International Tourism
- Faculty of Human Sciences
  - Department of Psychology and Communication
  - Department of Health Science
  - Department of Sports Science
- Graduate Studies

== Notable alumni ==
- Mari Amimoto, wheelchair basketball player
- Jason Storr, Author
