= Mio Ootani =

Japanese gravure idol (born 1992)

- 大谷 澪
- Born: 13 July 1992 (age 33); Neyagawa, Osaka Prefecture, Japan
- Occupation: Gravure idol

Mio Ootani (大谷 澪, Ōtani Mio; born July 13, 1992, in Neyagawa, Osaka Prefecture, Japan) is a Japanese gravure idol who is affiliated with K-point. She won the 2008 Miss Magazine Special Jury Prize.

== Filmography ==
=== TV series ===
Year	Title	Role	Network	Other notes	References
2010	The Ancient Dogoo Girl	Idol singer	MBS	Episode 4	
2011	Carnation	Rin	NHK	Week 9 - Week 16	
2013	Kamen Rider Wizard	Naomi	TV Asahi	Episodes 38 and 39	

=== Films ===
Year	Title	Role	Other notes	References
2012	Fashion Story: Model			
2014	Haganai	Sena Kashiwazaki		
