= Kinki Expressway =

National expressway in Osaka Prefecture, Japan

Kinki Expressway
- 近畿自動車道

Route information
- Length: 28.4 km (17.6 mi)
- Existed: 1970–present

Major junctions
- From: Suita Junction
- To: Matsubara Junction

Location
- Country: Japan
- Major cities: Suita, Osaka, Higashiōsaka, Yao

Highway system
- National highways of Japan; Expressways of Japan

Kinki Expressway (近畿自動車道, Kinki Jidōshadō) is a national expressway in Osaka Prefecture, Japan. It is owned and operated by West Nippon Expressway Company. In conjunction with the Chūgoku Expressway and the Osaka Chūō Kanjōsen of Osaka Prefectural Road 2, it will form a full outer ring road of Osaka. The expressway is designated with the number E26 under the Ministry of Land, Infrastructure, Transport and Tourism's "2016 Proposal for Realization of Expressway Numbering."

== Route description ==
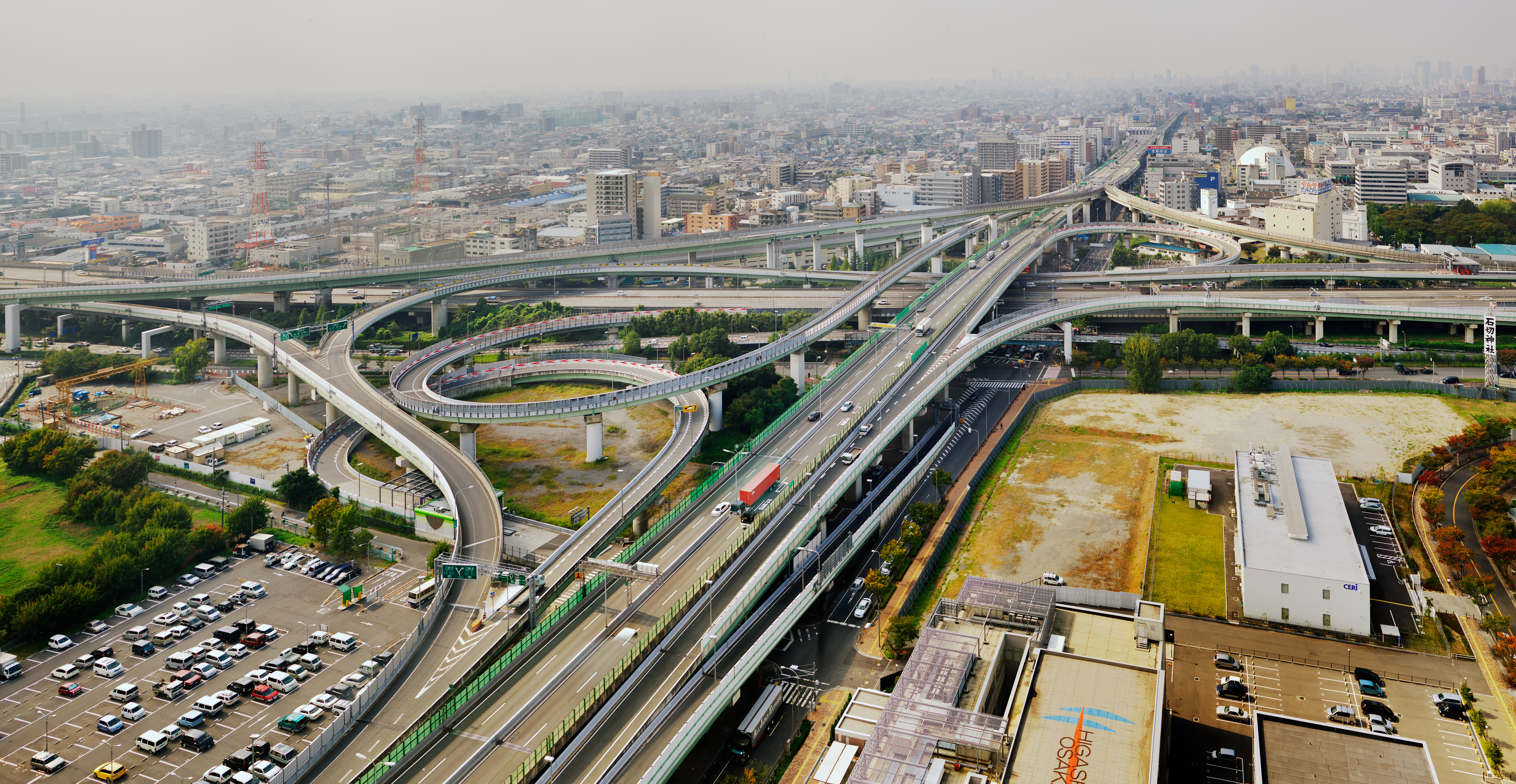
The Kinki Expressway at Higashiōsaka Interchange with the Hanshin Expressway Route 13.

The route originates from its junction with the Meishin Expressway and Chūgoku Expressway and extends east shortly, then southward. At its southern terminus it connects to the Nishi-Meihan Expressway and Hanwa Expressway. Tolls are charged at a flat rate (currently 510 yen for a regular passenger car). The speed limit is 60 km/h on the section between Suita Junction and Ibaraki Toll Gate and 80 km/h on all other sections.

== History ==
The first section of the expressway was opened to traffic in 1970 to coincide with the opening of Expo 70 in Osaka. The final section of the expressway (4.8 km between Yao Interchange and Matsubara Junction) was opened on 17 March 1988.

== Junction list ==
The entire expressway is in Osaka Prefecture.

Location	km	mi	Exit	Name	Destinations	Notes
Suita	0	0.0	35	Suita	Meishin Expressway – Kyoto, Kobe, Nishinomiya; Chūgoku Expressway – to San'yō Expressway, Takarazuka	Expressway continues at the Chūgoku Expressway
Ibaraki	2.9	1.8	TB	Ibaraki Toll Gate		Closed in 1994
Settsu	4.5	2.8	1	Settsu-kita		Entrance and exit for Matsubara-bound traffic.
Settsu	6.9	4.3	2	Settsu-minami		Entrance and exit for Suita-bound traffic.
Moriguchi	7.9	4.9	2-1	Moriguchi	Moriguchi Route	
Kadoma	11.2	7.0	3	Kadoma		Entrance and exit for Suita-bound traffic.
Kadoma	12.7	7.9	3-1	Kadoma	Daini Keihan Road	
Osaka	13.7	8.5	4	Daitō Tsurumi		Entrance and exit for Matsubara-bound traffic.
Higashiōsaka	14.7	9.1	5	Higashiōsaka-kita		Entrance and exit for Suita-bound traffic.
Higashiōsaka	15.7	9.8	PA	Higashiōsaka Parking Area		Access only to Matsubara-bound traffic.
Higashiōsaka	16.9	10.5	6	Higashiōsaka	Higashi-Osaka Route	
Higashiōsaka	20.4	12.7	7	Higashiōsaka-minami		Entrance and exit for Matsubara-bound traffic.
Yao			TB	Yao Toll Gate		
Yao	22.3	13.9	8	Yao	National Route 25, Osaka Prefecture Route 5	Entrance and exit for Suita-bound traffic.
Yao	22.9	14.2	PA	Yao Parking Area		Access only to Suita-bound traffic.
Osaka	26.6	16.5	9	Nagahara		Entrance and exit for Matsubara-bound traffic.
Matsubara	27.5	17.1	10	Matsubara	Nishi-Meihan Expressway; Matsubara Route	
Matsubara	28.4	17.6	11	Matsubara	Frontage road Hanwa Expressway	Expressway continues as the Hanwa Expressway; Entrance and exit for Suita-bound traffic.
1.000 mi = 1.609 km; 1.000 km = 0.621 mi: Closed/former; Incomplete access; Route transition
