= Japan National Route 479 =

Road in Osaka prefecture, Japan

National Route 479
- 国道479号
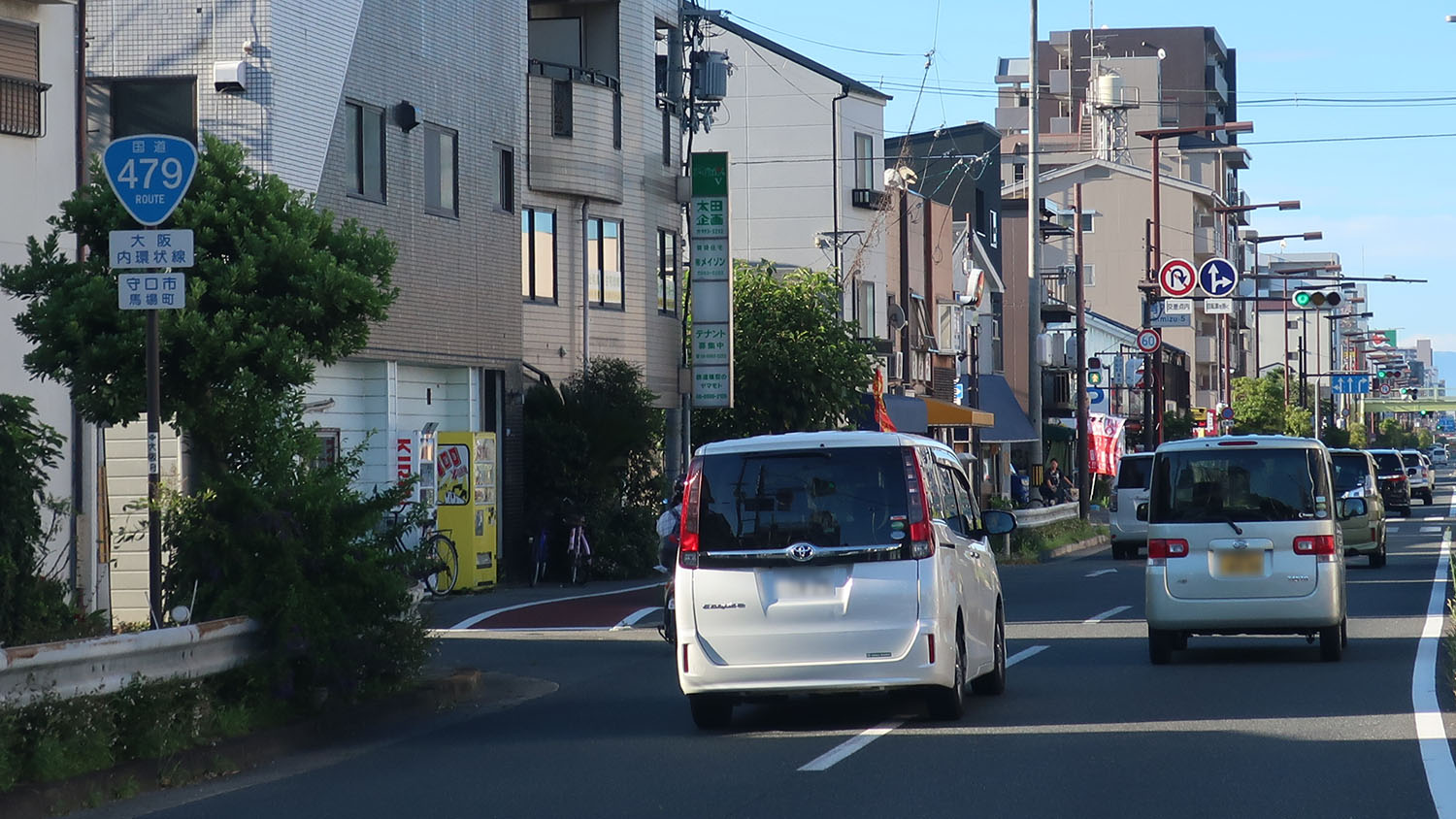

Route information
- Length: 28.6 km (17.8 mi)

Location
- Country: Japan

Highway system
- National highways of Japan; Expressways of Japan
← National Route 478	→ National Route 480

National Route 479 is a national highway of Japan. The highway connects Toyonaka, Osaka and Suminoe-ku, Osaka. It has a total length of 28.6 kilometers (17.8 mi).
