= Kadoma, Osaka =

Kadoma 門真市
- City
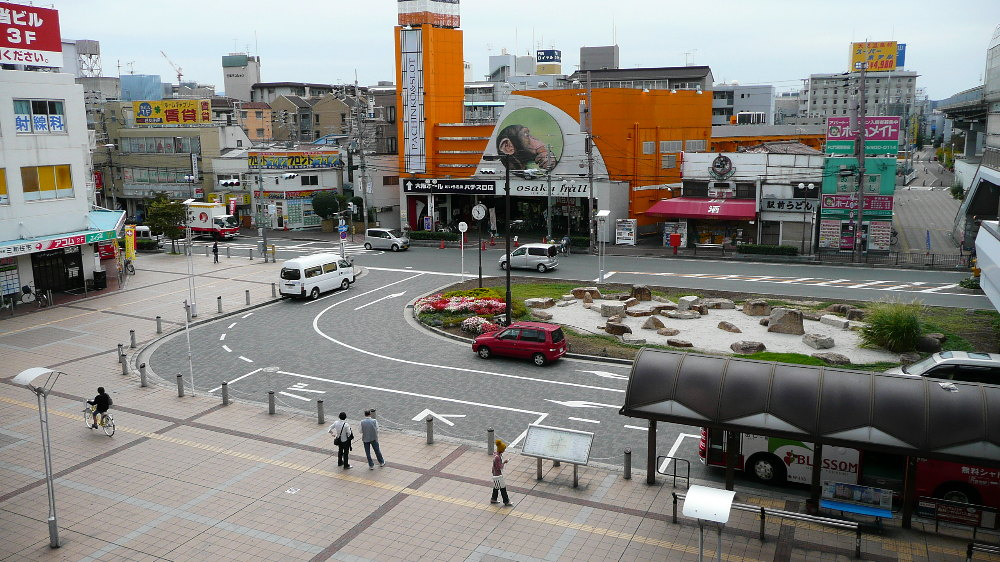
- Kadoma city

- Flag Emblem

- Location of Kadoma in Osaka Prefecture

- Location in Japan
- Coordinates: 34°44′N 135°35′E
- Country: Japan
- Region: Kansai
- Prefecture: Osaka

Government
  - Mayor: Kazutaka Miyamoto (since August 2016)

Area
  - Total: 12.30 km^{2} (4.75 sq mi)

Population (September 1, 2024)
  - Total: 116,511
  - Density: 9,472/km^{2} (24,530/sq mi)
- Time zone: UTC+09:00 (JST)
- City hall address: 1-1 Nakamachi, Kadoma-shi, Ōsaka-fu 571-8585
- Website: Official website
- Symbols
- Flower: Rhododendron indicum
- Tree: Camphor laurel

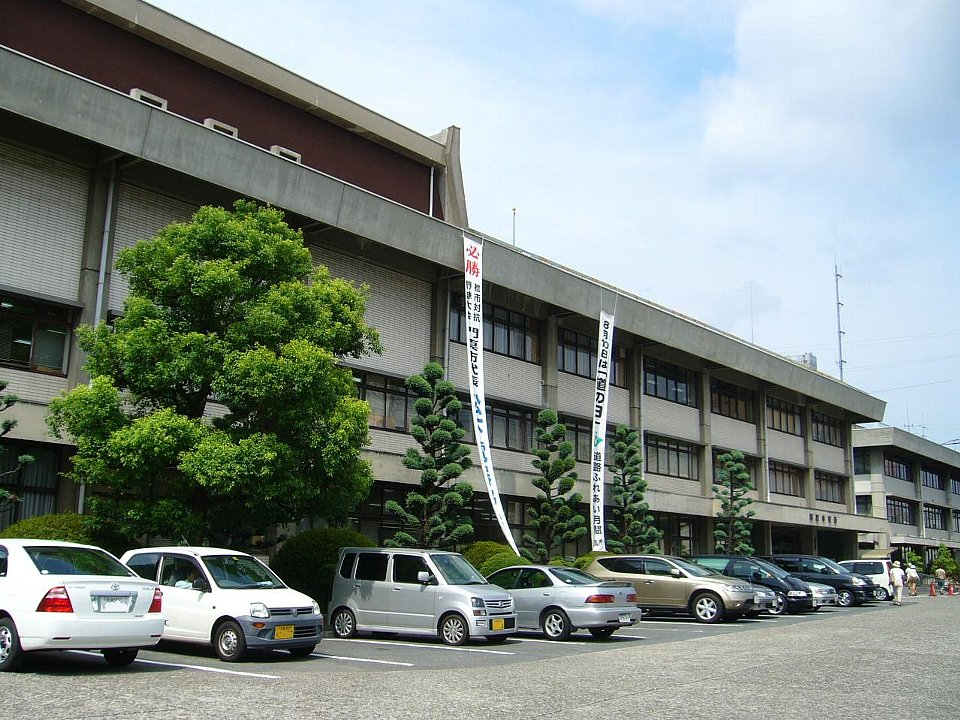
Kadoma City Hall

Kadoma (門真市, Kadoma-shi) is a city located in Osaka Prefecture, Japan. As of 1 September 2024, the city had an estimated population of 116,511 in 64301 households and a population density of 9680 persons per km^{2}. The total area of the city is 12.30 square kilometres (4.75 sq mi).

== Geography ==
Kadoma is located in the east-central part of Osaka Prefecture, adjacent to the Osaka metropolis, of which it is a satellite city. The city is approximately 4.9 kilometers east–west by 4.3 kilometers north–south, with the Furukawa River running through the center.

=== Neighboring municipalities ===
Osaka Prefecture

- Moriguchi
- Neyagawa
- Tsurumi-ku

== Climate ==
Kadoma has a humid subtropical climate (Köppen Cfa) characterized by warm summers and cool winters with light to no snowfall. The average annual temperature in Kadoma is 15.6 °C. The average annual rainfall is 1475 mm with September as the wettest month. The temperatures are highest on average in August, at around 27.7 °C, and lowest in January, at around 4.2 °C.

== Demographics ==
Per Japanese census data, the population of Kadoma rose very rapidly in the 1960s peaked around 1990 and has since started a mild decline.

Historical population
Year	Pop.	±%
1920	8,599	—
1930	10,507	+22.2%
1940	14,367	+36.7%
1950	17,313	+20.5%
1960	34,228	+97.7%
1970	141,041	+312.1%
1980	138,902	−1.5%
1990	142,297	+2.4%
2000	135,648	−4.7%
2010	130,368	−3.9%

== History ==
The area of the modern city of Kadoma was within ancient Kawachi Province. During the Jōmon period, this area was under Kawachi Bay, and inlet of Osaka Bay. During the Yayoi period the bay became a lake and various settlements arose on its shores. Dotaku ritual objects and kofun burial mounds were built, and the Kojiki and Nihon Shoki record that Emperor Nintoku ordered the construction of an embankment to control repeated flooding of the Yodo River, the early known of such projects in Japan. During the Heian period, large shōen landed estates were established, and in the Kamakura and Muromachi period, the entire area of the city was under cultivation. During the Edo Period, due to its proximity to Kyoto and Osaka, most of the area was held as tenryō territory under the direct control of the Tokugawa shogunate. The village of Kadoma, was established within Matta District with the creation of the modern municipalities system on April 1, 1889. On April 1, 1896 the area became part of Kitakawachi District, Osaka. On April 1, 1939 Kadoma raised to town status. The neighboring villages of Owada and Shinomiya were absorbed on September 30, 1956. On August 1, 1963 Kadoma was raised to city status. Plans to merge Kadoma with the neighboring city of Moriguchi were rejected overwhelming by local residents of both cities in 2005.

== Government ==
Kadoma has a mayor-council form of government with a directly elected mayor and a unicameral city council of 20 members. Kadoma contributes one member to the Osaka Prefectural Assembly. In terms of national politics, the city is part of Osaka 6th district of the lower house of the Diet of Japan.

== Economy ==
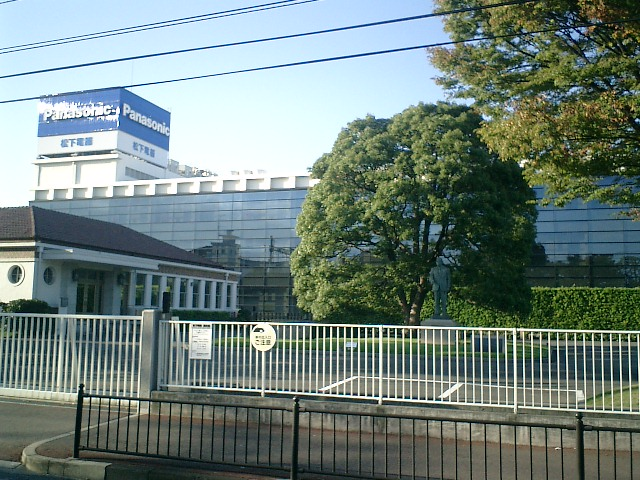
Panasonic Corporation headquarters

Kadoma was traditionally known as the "breadbasket" of Osaka and was especially noted for its lotus roots. Due to its proximity to the Osaka metropolis and multiple transportation connections, Kadoma is now largely a commuter town. However, a number of large corporations have the headquarters and head factories in the city, including Panasonic Corporation, Tiger Corporation and Kaiyodo have their headquarters in Kadoma.

== Education ==
Kadoma has 14 public elementary schools and six public middle schools operated by the city government and two public high schools operated by the Osaka Prefectural Department of Education. The prefecture also operates one special education school for the handicapped.

== Transportation ==
=== Railways ===
Keihan Electric Railway – Keihan Main Line

- Nishisanso - Kadoma-shi - Furukawabashi - Owada - Kayashima

Osaka Metro - Nagahori Tsurumi-ryokuchi Line

- Kadomaminami

Osaka Monorail - Main Line

- Kadoma-shi

=== Highways ===
- Kinki Expressway
- National Route 163

== Sister cities ==
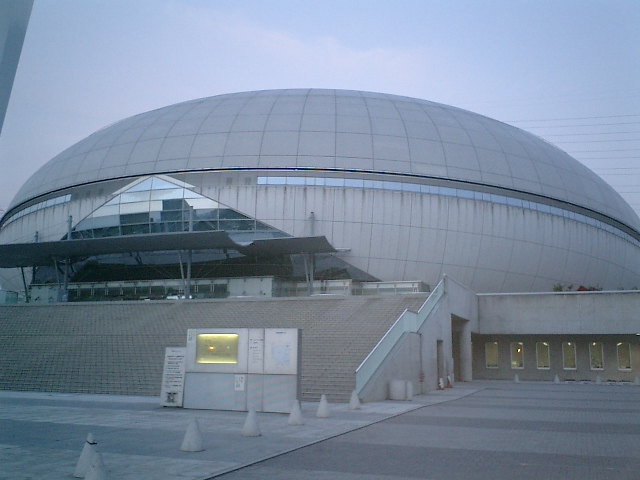
Namihaya Dome

Kadoma is twinned with:

- Eindhoven, Netherlands, since 1967
- Kami, Japan, since 1975 (with former Muraoka town)
- São José dos Campos, Brazil, since 1973

== Local attractions ==
- Namihaya Dome

== Notable people from Kadoma ==
- Yuta Nakamoto, K-Pop idol (member of NCT, more specifically NCT 127) and actor
- Ryo Nishikido, Japanese singer-songwriter and actor
- Kijūrō Shidehara, Japanese diplomat and prime minister
- Kenichi Yamamoto, mixed martial artist
