= Japan National Route 170 =

National highway in Japan

National Route 170
- 国道170号
- Osaka Outer Loop Line
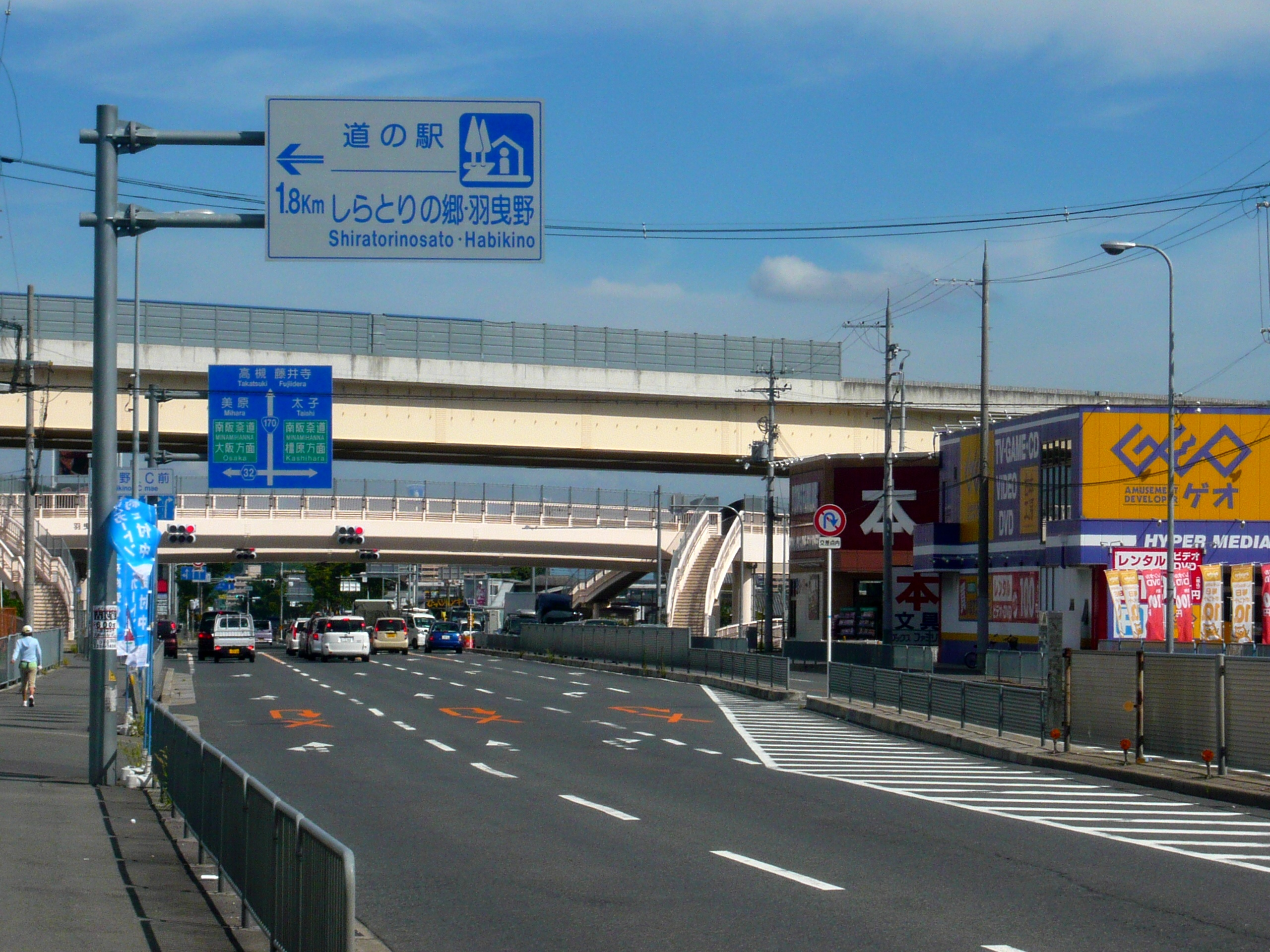

Route information
- Length: 74.0 km (46.0 mi)
- Existed: 1 April 1963–present

Major junctions
- North end: National Route 171 in Takatsuki, Osaka
- South end: National Route 26 in Izumisano, Osaka

Location
- Country: Japan

Highway system
- National highways of Japan; Expressways of Japan
← National Route 169	→ National Route 171

National Route 170 is a national highway of Japan connecting Takatsuki, Osaka and Izumisano, Osaka in Japan, with a total length of 74 km (45.98 mi).

== History ==
Route 170 was originally designated on 18 May 1953 from Wakayama to Matsusaka (this was Route 41 from 1945 to 1953). After it was extended to Tsu, the route was redesignated as Route 42 on 1 April 1959. Route 170 was reassigned on a route from Takatsuki to Hashimoto on 1 April 1963. On 1 April 1982 the terminus was moved from Hashimoto to Izumisano.
