= Kobe Route =

Expressway connecting the Osaka and Kobe areas

Hanshin Expressway Route 3 Kobe Route 阪神高速3号神戸線
- The Kobe Route highlighted in red

Route information
- Maintained by Hanshin Expressway Company, Limited
- Length: 39.4 km (24.5 mi)
- Existed: 1966–present

Major junctions
- East end: Awaza Junction in Nishi-ku, Osaka; Ōsakakō Route
- West end: Daini-Shinmei Road

Location
- Country: Japan

Highway system
- National highways of Japan; Expressways of Japan

The Kobe Route (神戸線, Kobe-sen), signed as Route 3, is one of the routes of the Hanshin Expressway system serving the Keihanshin area in Kansai, Japan. It is an intercity route that travels in an east to west direction from Osaka to Kobe, with a total length of 39.4 kilometers (24.5 mi).

== Route description ==
The Kobe Route begins at Awaza Junction in Nishi-ku, Osaka, where it meets the Ōsakakō Route. From there it travels west from central Osaka. It meets the planned outer loop expressway of the city, the partially completed Yodogawa-Sagan Route, on the southern bank of the Yodo River. After this, the expressway crosses into the city of Amagasaki in eastern Hyōgo Prefecture. Upon entering Amagasaki, the expressway meets National Route 43, which then travels directly alongside the expressway all the way to Kobe.

Along the way to Kobe the expressway has a junction with the Meishin Expressway, the western terminus of that expressway, though direct access to the Meishin Expressway is limited with access being completed via National Route 43. In Nada-ku, Kobe, National Route 43 diverges from the Kobe Route and ends at an intersection with National Route 2. National Route 2 then takes its place as the parallel road for the Kobe Route through central Kobe.

In central Kobe, the expressway closely follows the coastline of the Port of Kobe. Along this stretch of the route, a junction connects the expressway to the Shin-Kobe Tunnel. Continuing west, the expressway leaves the coastline and central Kobe. It then curves north in Suma-ku, Kobe, leaving National Route 2. The expressway meets its western terminus in the ward, but continues west as the Daini-Shinmei Road.

== History ==
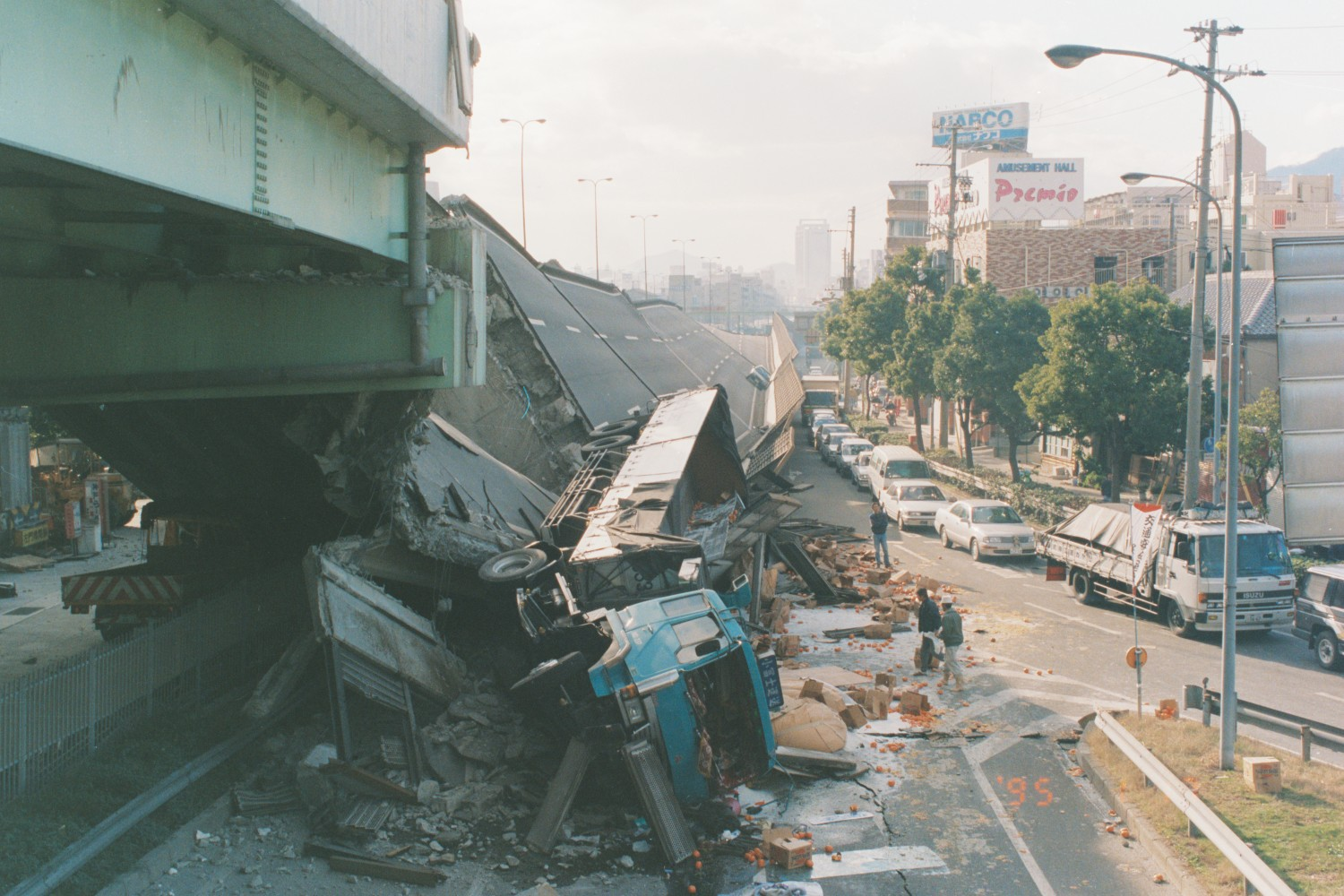
A collapsed section of the Kobe Route after the Great Hanshin earthquake.

The first section of the Kobe Route was opened in 1966. The elevated section of the expressway in central Kobe was built in 1969 during the preparation for the Expo '70 world's fair held in nearby Suita.

When 18 spans of this section collapsed in 1995 during the Great Hanshin earthquake, the stricken expressway became a focal point of the disaster for the media. The structure could not resist the forces of the unprecedented earthquake due to various design inadequacies, including too shallow a foundation for the support pillars and a lack of sufficient either external or internal transverse reinforcement for the pillars. The collapse of the structure did not result in any casualties. The elevated expressway was rebuilt by the end of 1996 and the surviving pillars were retrofitted with steel sheathing to prevent the same type of failure from recurring.

On 18 December 2010, the Kobe Route was linked to the Kobe-Yamate Route after Minatogawa Junction was opened to traffic. On 31 October 2016, Amagasaki-Shūya Toll Gate was removed, it was replaced with a parking area that opened on 19 March 2019.

== List of interchanges ==
Prefecture	Location	km	mi	Exit	Name	Destinations	Notes
Osaka	Osaka	0.0	0.0	–	Awaza	Ōsakakō Route – to Loop Route	Eastern terminus
Osaka	Osaka	0.3	0.19	3-01	Nishinagahori	Osaka Prefecture Route 29 (Shin-Naniwasuji)	Eastbound exit, westbound entrance
Osaka	Osaka	0.9	0.56	3-02	Nakanoshima-nishi	Nakanoshima-dōri; Osaka Prefecture Route 29 – to Loop Route	Eastbound exit, westbound entrance
Osaka	Osaka	3.1	1.9	3-03	Ebie	Osaka-Shidōkujō-Umeda Route	Eastbound exit, westbound entrance
Osaka	Osaka	3.2	2.0	–	Ebie	Yodogawa-Sagan Route – to Kansai Airport, Bayshore Route	Eastbound exit, westbound entrance
Osaka	Osaka	4.2	2.6	3-04	Himejima	Unnamed city streets	Eastbound entrance, westbound exit
Osaka	Osaka	5.1	3.2	3-05	Ōwada	Yodogawa-dōri	Eastbound exit, westbound entrance
Hyōgo	Amagasaki	7.0	4.3	3-06	Amagasaki-higashi	Unnamed city streets	Eastbound exit only
Hyōgo	Amagasaki	8.3	5.2	PA	Amagasaki		Parking area for westbound traffic; formerly a toll gate
Hyōgo	Amagasaki	10.7	6.6	3-07	Amagasaki-nishi	Unnamed city streets	Eastbound exit, westbound entrance
Hyōgo	Nishinomiya	11.9	7.4	3-08	Mukogawa	National Route 43 – to Meishin Expressway, Koshien Stadium	Eastbound entrance, westbound exit; westbound traffic for the Meishin Expressway needs to exit here.
Hyōgo	Nishinomiya	14.5	9.0	3-09	Nishinomiya	Meishin Expressway east – to Osaka Airport	Eastbound exit, westbound entrance; western terminus of E1
Hyōgo	Nishinomiya	16.8	10.4	3-10	Nishinomiya	National Route 43 – Koshien Stadium	Eastbound exit, westbound entrance
Hyōgo	Ashiya	17.4	10.8	3-11	Ashiya	National Route 43	Eastbound entrance, westbound exit
Hyōgo	Ashiya	17.8	11.1		Ashiya Toll Booth		Westbound traffic only
Hyōgo	Kobe	21.4	13.3	3-12	Fukae	National Route 43 – Kobe University Fukae Campus	Eastbound exit, westbound entrance
Hyōgo	Kobe	22.7	14.1	3-13	Uozaki	National Route 43 – Rokkō Island	Eastbound entrance, westbound exit
Hyōgo	Kobe	27.3	17.0	3-14 / 3-15	Maya	Hyōgo Prefecture Route 491 – to Kansai Airport, Bayshore Route, HAT Kobe	
Hyōgo	Kobe	29.6	18.4	3-16	Ikutagawa	Shin-Kobe Tunnel; National Route 2 Unnamed city streets	ETC-only entrance from Shin-Kobe Tunnel and National Route 2, eastbound exit to city streets
Hyōgo	Kobe	30.8	19.1	3-17 / 3-18 / PA	Kyōbashi	Shin-Kobe Tunnel – to Kobe Airport, Bayshore Route, Harbor Highway, Port Island	
Hyōgo	Kobe	34.2	21.3	3-19 / 3-20	Yanagihara	National Route 2	
Hyōgo	Kobe	36.1	22.4	3-21 / 3-22	Minatogawa	Kobe-Yamate Route – to Kita-Kobe Route; Unnamed city streets	No access to Kobe-Yamate Route for eastbound traffic
Hyōgo	Kobe	38.1	23.7	3-23	Wakamiya	National Route 2 / National Route 28 / National Route 250 – Suma	Eastbound entrance, westbound exit
Hyōgo	Kobe	39.4	24.5	3-24	Tsukimiyama	Hyōgo Prefecture Route 21 (Kobe-Akashi Route) – Suma	Eastbound entrance, westbound exit
Hyōgo	Kobe	39.4	24.5			Daini-Shinmei Road	Western terminus of Kobe Route, expressway continues west as the Daini-Shimmei Road
1.000 mi = 1.609 km; 1.000 km = 0.621 mi: Incomplete access; Route transition
