= Kita-Kobe Route =

Expressway in Hyōgo Prefecture, Japan

Hanshin Expressway Route 7 Kita-Kobe Route 阪神高速7号北神戸線
- The Kita-Kobe Route highlighted in red

Route information
- Maintained by Hanshin Expressway Company, Limited
- Length: 35.6 km (22.1 mi)
- Existed: 1985–present

Major junctions
- West end: Daini-Shinmei Road
- East end: Chūgoku Expressway

Location
- Country: Japan

Highway system
- National highways of Japan; Expressways of Japan

The Kita-Kobe Route (北神戸線, Kita-Kōbe-sen), signed as Route 7, is one of the routes of the Hanshin Expressway system serving the Keihanshin area. It is an intercity route that travels in and west to east direction from Kobe to Nishinomiya, with a total length of 35.6 kilometers (22.1 mi).

== List of interchanges ==
The entire expressway lies within Hyōgo Prefecture

Location	km	mi	Exit	Name	Destinations	Notes
Kobe	0.0	0.0	7-01	Ikawadani	Daini-Shinmei Road – Himeji	Western terminus; westbound exit, eastbound entrance
Kobe	1.9	1.2	7-02	Nagaidani	Kitasen Road – to San'yō Expressway, Kobe-Awaji-Naruto Expressway (Akashi Bridge), Tokushima	Westbound entrance, eastbound exit
Kobe	4.8	3.0	7-03 / 7-04	Zenkai	Hyōgo Prefecture Route 65 – Seishin New Town, Academic Town	Parking area
Kobe	7.1	4.4	–	Fusehata	Kobe-Awaji-Naruto Expressway (Akashi Bridge) – to San'yō Expressway, Tokushima	
Kobe	7.3	4.5	7-05	Fusehata-nishi	Hyōgo Prefecture Route 16	Westbound entrance, eastbound exit
Kobe	8.8	5.5	7-06	Fusehata-higashi	Hyōgo Prefecture Route 22	Westbound exit, eastbound entrance
Kobe	9.7	6.0	–	Shirakawa	Kobe-Yamate Route – to Kobe Route, Bayshore Route, Osaka	
Kobe	10.7	6.6	7-07	Shiowase no mura	Parking area / Shiowase no mura	No access to public roads
Kobe	13.6	8.5	7-08	Aina	Hyōgo Prefecture Route 52 – Suzurandai	
Kobe	18.2	11.3	7-09	Minotani	Shin-Kobe Tunnel south – Central Kobe	
Kobe	22.6– 25.1	14.0– 15.6	7-10 / 7-11	Karatonishi	Hyōgo Prefecture Route 95 (Rokkō Toll Road) – Mount Rokkō	
Kobe	26.3	16.3	–	Arimaguchi	branch route – Sanda, Gosha	Westbound entrance, eastbound exit
Kobe	26.7	16.6	7-12	Arimaguchi	Hyōgo Prefecture Route 51	Westbound entrance, eastbound exit
Nishinomiya	29.8	18.5	7-13 / 7-14	Nishinomiya-minami	Hyōgo Prefecture Route 82 – Arima Onsen	
Nishinomiya	32.3	20.1	7-15	Nishinomiya-Yamaguchi-higashi	National Route 176 – Sanda, Takarazuka	Westbound entrance, eastbound exit
Nishinomiya	32.4	20.1	7-16	Nishinomiya-Yamaguchi-higashi	Chūgoku Expressway – Takarazuka, Osaka	Eastern terminus; westbound entrance, eastbound exit
1.000 mi = 1.609 km; 1.000 km = 0.621 mi: Incomplete access
