= Nishi-Osaka Route =

Expressway in Osaka, Japan

Hanshin Expressway Route 17 Nishi-Osaka Route 阪神高速17号西大阪線
- The Nishi-Osaka Route highlighted in red

Route information
- Maintained by Hanshin Expressway Company, Limited
- Length: 3.8 km (2.4 mi)
- Existed: 1970–present

Major junctions
- East end: Minami Hiraki Junction in Nishinari-ku, Osaka; Sakai Route
- West end: Ajigawa exit/entrance in Minato-ku, Osaka; National Route 43

Location
- Country: Japan

Highway system
- National highways of Japan; Expressways of Japan

The Nishi-Osaka Route (西大阪線, Nishi-Osaka-sen), signed as Route 17, is one of the tolled routes of the Hanshin Expressway system serving the Keihanshin area in Kansai, Japan. It travels in a southeast to northwest direction in Osaka, from the Sakai Route, in the city's Nishinari ward, to National Route 43 in the ward of Minato. The expressway has a total length of 3.8 kilometers (2.4 mi). Construction on the expressway was completed in 1970.

== Route description ==
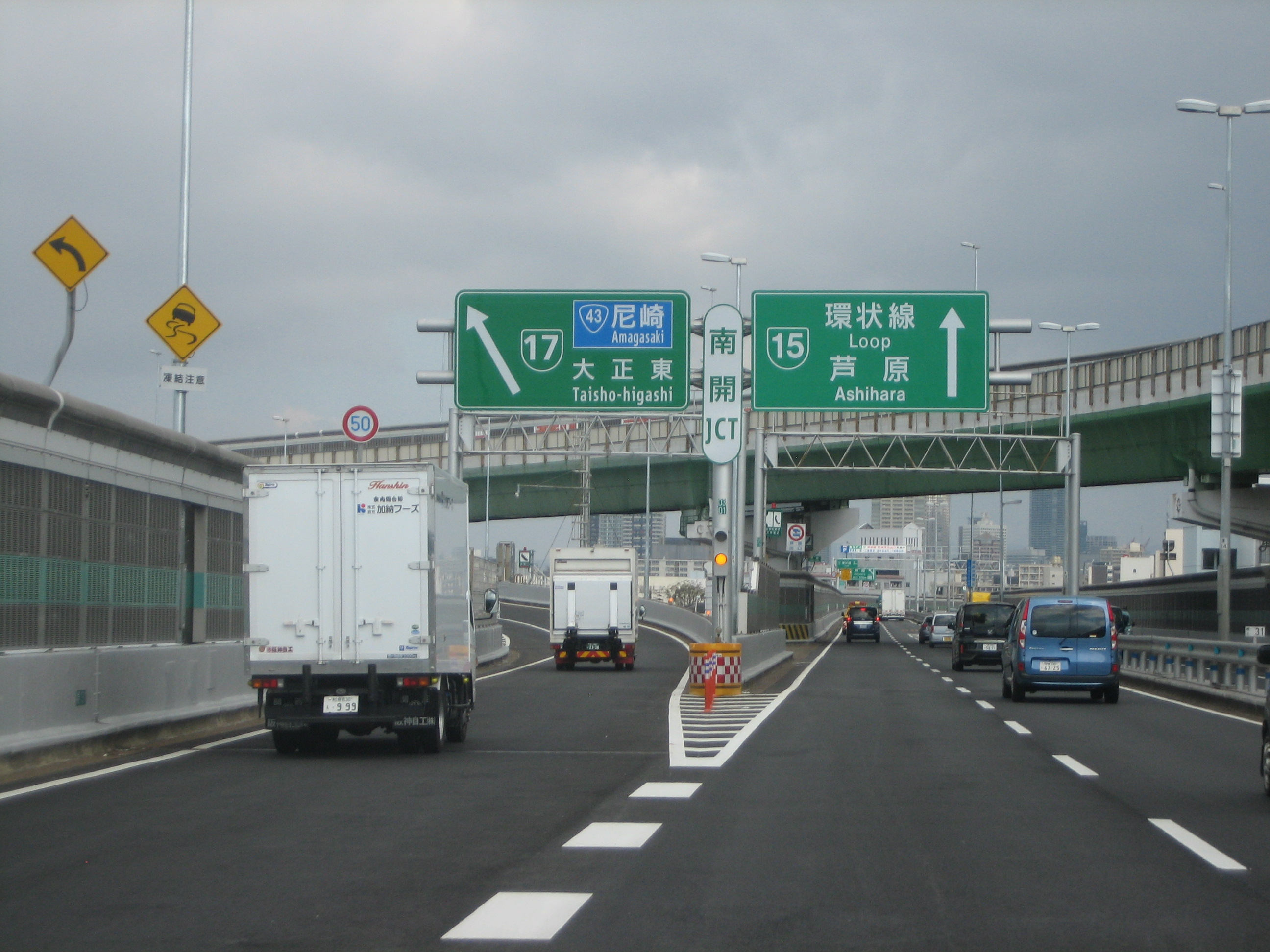
The Nishi-Osaka Route at Minami Hiraki Junction

The Nishi-Osaka Route begins at Minami Hiraki Junction in Nishinari-ku, Osaka, where it meets the Sakai Route. This junction has minimal connections between the two highways, as the entrance to the westbound side of the Nishi-Osaka Route has access limited to traffic from northbound Sakai Route, and the eastbound exit from the Nishi-Osaka Route only leads to southbound side of the Sakai Route. Aside from the ramps that connect the expressways, the rest of the Sakaki Route is an elevated highway that is anchored in the median of National Route 43. The national highway serves as a street level access road for the expressway, with every entrance and exit on the expressway beyond Minami Hiraki Junction linking directly to it. National Route 43 has also served as a detour of the expressway during closures. A "mini" parking area with toilets and vending machines is placed on the eastbound side of the expressway adjacent to Bentenchō Station. The expressway terminates after it merges into National Route 43 at the Ajigawa entrance and exit ramps, just short of the southern bank of the Aji River.

Like the other routes of the Hanshin Expressway system, users of the Nishi-Osaka Route are subject to tolls. The operators of passenger vehicles must pay a fee of 210 yen to use the expressway, while buses and trucks must pay 420 yen. An exception to this rate applies between 10:00 pm and 6:00 am if users have vehicles equipped with ETC transponders. In that case, the expressway's toll rate is 100 yen for passenger cars and 210 yen for trucks and buses. These fees will remain in effect through 31 March 2032.

== History ==
Construction of the Nishi-Osaka Route began in 1967 in preparation for the Expo '70 held in the nearby city of Suita. The expressway was completed after three years of construction in 1970.

== List of interchanges ==
The entire expressway lies within Osaka Prefecture.

Location	km	mi	Exit	Name	Destinations	Notes
Osaka	0.0	0.0	–	Minami Hiraki	Sakai Route – Sakai	Toll booth is attached to the junction; westbound entrance from northbound Sakai Route, eastbound exit to southbound Sakai Route
Osaka	0.7	0.43	17-01	Kitatsumori	National Route 43 – Tennōji Station	
Osaka	1.0	0.62	17-02	Taisho-higashi	National Route 43	
Osaka	2.3	1.4	17-03	Taisho-nishi	National Route 43	
Osaka	2.8	1.7	17-04	Bentenchō	National Route 43	
Osaka			–	Bentenchō Parking Area		
Osaka	3.8	2.4	17-05	Ajigawa	National Route 43 – Amagasaki	Northern terminus; highway continues as the National Route 43
1.000 mi = 1.609 km; 1.000 km = 0.621 mi: Incomplete access; Route transition
