= E71 =

E71 can refer to:

- King's Indian Defense, Encyclopaedia of Chess Openings code
- Nokia E71 - a 2008 mobile phone.
- European route E71
- BMW E-71
- Kansai-Kūkō Expressway (includes Sky Gate Bridge R), route E71 in Japan
