= Yodogawa-Sagan Route =

Expressway connecting the Osaka and Kobe areas

Hanshin Expressway Route 2 Yodogawa-Sagan Route 阪神高速2号淀川左岸線
- The Yodogawa-Sagan Route highlighted in red

Route information
- Maintained by Hanshin Expressway Company, Limited
- Length: 5.6 km (3.5 mi)
- Existed: 1994–present

Major junctions
- West end: Hokkō Junction in Konohana-ku, Osaka; Bayshore Route
- East end: Ebie Junction in Konohana-ku, Osaka; Kobe Route

Location
- Country: Japan

Highway system
- National highways of Japan; Expressways of Japan

The Yodogawa-Sagan Route (淀川左岸線, Yodogawa-Sagan-sen), signed as Route 2, is one of the routes of the Hanshin Expressway system serving the Keihanshin area in Kansai, Japan. It travels in a west to east direction in Konohana-ku, Osaka, from the Bayshore Route, near Universal Studios Japan to the Kobe Route, with a total length of 5.6 kilometers (3.5 mi).
