= Sakai Route =

Expressway in Osaka, Japan

Hanshin Expressway Route 15 Sakai Route 阪神高速15号堺線
- The Sakai Route highlighted in red

Route information
- Maintained by Hanshin Expressway Company, Limited
- Length: 13.4 km (8.3 mi)
- Existed: 1970–present

Major junctions
- North end: Kōdzu entrance in Chūō-ku, Osaka; Sennichi-mae-dōri
- Loop Route; Nishi-Osaka Route
- South end: Sakai exit/entrance in Sakai; National Route 26

Location
- Country: Japan

Highway system
- National highways of Japan; Expressways of Japan

The Sakai Route (堺線, Sakai-sen), signed as Route 15, is one of the tolled routes of the Hanshin Expressway system serving the Keihanshin area in Kansai, Japan. It travels in a north to south direction from the Chūō ward of Osaka, beginning at a junction with Sennichi-mae-dōri, to National Route 26 in the city of Sakai. The expressway has a total length of 13.4 kilometers (8.3 mi).

== Route description ==
The Sakai Route travels in a north to south direction from the Chūō ward of Osaka, beginning as a one-way highway at junction with Sennichi-mae-dōri. The one-way route meets the Loop Route twice in central Osaka, once on the loop's eastern side and again on its western side in Namba. At the second junction with the Loop Route, the Sakai Route's northbound traffic terminates, continuing south towards the city of Sakai as a dual carriageway. From there, it briefly parallels the Hanshin Namba Line to Shiomibashi Station where the expressway curves to the south. In the Nishinari ward the expressway meets the Nishi-Osaka Route; however the junction between the two routes is limited to two ramps: one that travels from northbound traffic of the Sakai Route to begin the westbound side of the Nishi-Osaka Route and another that leads eastbound traffic of the Nishi-Osaka Route onto the southbound side of the Sakai Route.

The expressway crosses into Sakai at a bridge over the Yamato River. A planned junction between the Yamatogawa Route and the Sakai Route would be on the southern bank of the river. The expressway meets its southern terminus upon meeting National Route 26 in Sakai, though the roadway continues as the national route. Overall, the Sakai Route has a total length of 13.4 kilometers (8.3 mi).

== History ==
Construction of the Nishi-Osaka Route began in 1967 in preparation for the Expo '70 held in the nearby city of Suita. The first section of the expressway was completed after three years of construction in 1970. Another 1.2-kilometer-long (0.75 mi) section of the expressway that runs within the confines of the Loop Route in central Osaka was opened in 1972. The entire expressway was completed by 1976.

== Future ==
Plans for a junction between the Sakai Route and the Yamatogawa Route have been made, but as of November 2020 there has been no progress in building the interchange.

== List of interchanges ==
The entire expressway lies within Osaka Prefecture.

Location	km	mi	Exit	Name	Destinations	Notes
Osaka	0.0	0.0	1-11	Kōdzu	Sennichi-mae-dōri	Northern terminus of southbound Sakai Route; southbound entrance only from westbound Sennichi-mae-dōri
Osaka	0.5	0.31	–	Kōdzu	Loop Route	
Osaka	1.2	0.75	–	Minatomachi	Loop Route – Shimanobashi	Northern terminus of northbound Sakai Route
Osaka	1.2	0.75	15-01	Minatomachi	Loop Route – Namba, Minatomachi Parking Area	Southbound and northbound exit, access to Minatomachi Parking Area via northbound exit with return access to the Loop Route
Osaka	2.5	1.6	15-02	Shiomibashi	Shin-Naniwa-suji	Southbound entrance only
Osaka	3.4	2.1	15-03	Ashihara	Shin-Naniwa-suji	Northbound exit only
Osaka	4.0	2.5	–	Minami Hiraki	Nishi-Osaka Route west – to National Route 43, Amagasaki	Southbound entrance, northbound exit
Osaka	4.7	2.9	15-04	Tsumori	Unnamed city street	Southbound entrance, northbound exit
Osaka	6.8	4.2	15-05	Tamade	Unnamed city street – Sumiyoshi Shrine, Nanko	Southbound exit, northbound entrance
Osaka	9.5	5.9	15-06	Suminoe	National Route 26	Southbound exit and entrance, northbound entrance
Sakai			–	Yamatogawa Daiichi	Yamatogawa Route	Planned interchange
Sakai	12.8– 13.4	8.0– 8.3	15-07 / 15-08	Sakai	National Route 26 – Wakayama; National Route 310 south – Kawachinagano	Southern terminus; highway continues as National Route 26
1.000 mi = 1.609 km; 1.000 km = 0.621 mi: Incomplete access; Route transition; Unopened
