= E94 =

E94 can refer to:

- European route E94, a road
- Orthodox variation of the King's Indian Defence, Encyclopaedia of Chess Openings code
- Kitasen Road, route E94 in Japan
