= Kobe-Yamate Route =

Expressway in Hyōgo Prefecture, Japan

Hanshin Expressway Route 31 Kobe-Yamate Route 阪神高速31号神戸山手線
- The Kobe-Yamate Route highlighted in red

Route information
- Maintained by Hanshin Expressway Company, Limited
- Length: 10.2 km (6.3 mi)
- Existed: 2003–present

Major junctions
- South end: Kobe Route
- North end: Kita-Kobe Route

Location
- Country: Japan

Highway system
- National highways of Japan; Expressways of Japan

The Kobe-Yamate Route (神戸山手線, Kobe-Yamate-sen), signed as Route 31, is one of the routes of the Hanshin Expressway system serving the Keihanshin area. It travels in a south to north direction within the city of Kobe from the city's Nagata ward to Kita ward, with a total length of 10.2 kilometers (6.3 mi).
