= E93 =

E93 may refer to:

- European route E93
- King's Indian Defense, Encyclopaedia of Chess Openings code
- Daini-Shinmei Road, route E93 in Japan

== See also ==
- BMW 3 Series (E90)
