= Kansai-Kūkō Expressway =

Expressway in Osaka Prefecture, Japan

Kansai-Kuko Expressway
- 関西空港自動車道

Route information
- Length: 6.6 km (4.1 mi)
- Existed: 1994–present

Major junctions
- From: Izumisano Junction in Izumisano, Osaka; Hanwa Expressway
- To: Rinku Junction in Izumisano, Osaka; Sky Gate Bridge R Hanshin Expressway Bayshore Route

Location
- Country: Japan

Highway system
- National highways of Japan; Expressways of Japan

The Kansai-Kūkō Expressway (関西空港自動車道, Kansai-Kūkō Jidōsha-dō) (lit. Kansai Airport Expressway) is a 4-laned national expressway in Izumisano, Osaka, Japan. It is owned and operated by West Nippon Expressway Company.

== Route description ==
The expressway is a short connector route linking the Sky Gate Bridge R, and ultimately, Kansai International Airport, with the Hanwa Expressway.

National Route 481 serves as a frontage road for the expressway.

== History ==
The Kansai-Kūkō Expressway opened on 2 April 1994, five months prior to the opening of Kansai International Airport.

== Junction list ==
The entire expressway is in Osaka Prefecture.

Location	km	mi	Exit	Name	Destinations	Notes
Izumisano	0.0	0.0	18	Izumisano	Hanwa Expressway – Kaizuka, Osaka, Sennan, Wakayama	Southern terminus
Izumisano	1.0	0.62	1	Kaminogō	National Route 481	Northbound exit, southbound entrance
Izumisano	4.1	2.5	2	Izumisano	National Route 26 – Izumisano; National Route 481 – Rinku Town	Northbound exit, southbound entrance
Izumisano	6.6	4.1	3	Rinku	Hanshin Expressway Bayshore Route – Osaka, Kobe; Sky Gate Bridge R – Kansai Airport	Northern terminus, E71 continues on to Sky Gate Bridge R
1.000 mi = 1.609 km; 1.000 km = 0.621 mi: Incomplete access; Route transition
