= Bayshore Route (Port of Osaka-Kobe) =

Expressway connecting the Osaka and Kobe areas

Hanshin Expressway Route 5 Bayshore Route 阪神高速5号湾岸線
- The Bayshore Route highlighted in red

Route information
- Maintained by Hanshin Expressway Company, Limited
- Length: 23.1 km (14.4 mi)
- Existed: 1991–present

Major junctions
- East end: Nankō Junction in Suminoe-ku, Osaka; Bayshore Route
- West end: Tarumi Junction in Tarumi-ku, Kobe; Kobe-Awaji-Naruto Expressway; Kitasen Road

Location
- Country: Japan

Highway system
- National highways of Japan; Expressways of Japan

The Bayshore Route (湾岸線, Wangan-sen), signed as Route 5, is one of the routes of the Hanshin Expressway system serving the Keihanshin area. It is an intercity route that travels in an east to west direction from Suminoe-ku, Osaka to Tarumi-ku, Kobe. It has a total length of 32.7 kilometers (20.3 mi).
