= Daini-Shinmei Road =

Road in Hyogo prefecture, Japan

Daini-Shinmei Road
- 第二神明道路 (Daini Shinmei Dōro)

Route information
- Maintained by West Nippon Expressway Company
- Length: 24.3 km (15.1 mi)
- Existed: 1964–present
- Component highways: National Route 2

Major junctions
- East end: Hanshin Expressway Kobe Route in Suma-ku, Kobe
- West end: Akashi-nishi Interchange; National Route 2 (Kakogawa Bypass) in Akashi, Hyogo

Location
- Country: Japan

Highway system
- National highways of Japan; Expressways of Japan

The Daini-Shinmei Road (第二神明道路, Daini-Shinmei Dōro) is a toll road in Kobe and Akashi, Japan. It is owned and operated by West Nippon Expressway Company and is signed as E93 under the Ministry of Land, Infrastructure, Transport and Tourism's (MLIT) "2016 Proposal for Realization of Expressway Numbering."

== Route description ==
The Daini-Shinmei Road has two lanes in each direction. The speed limit is 70 km/h along the entirety of the road.

== History ==
- Myōdani interchange to Ōkuradani interchange opened in 1964
- Suma (Tsukimiyama) interchange to Myōdani interchange opened in 1969
- Ōkuradani interchange to Akashi-nishi interchange opened in 1970

The opening was timed to coincide with the Expo '70 in Osaka.

== Future ==
MLIT is in the process of acquiring right of way to build a 7.1 km (4.4 mi) extension of the Kitasen Road to link up with the Daini-Shinmei Road at an interchange in the Ishigatani area of Akashi.

== Junction list ==
The entire expressway is in Hyōgo Prefecture. PA= parking area, SA= service area, TB= toll gate.

Location	km	mi	Exit	Name	Destinations	Notes
Suma-ku, Kobe	0.0	0.0			Hanshin Expressway Kobe Route	Eastern terminus; expressway continues east as the Kobe Route of the Hanshin Expressway
Suma-ku, Kobe	0.9	0.56	1	Suma	Hyogo Prefecture Route 65	Eastbound exit, westbound entrance; expressway continues east as the Kobe Route of the Hanshin Expressway
Suma-ku, Kobe	1.7	1.1	TB	Suma		
Tarumi-ku, Kobe	3.2	2.0	PA	Tarumi		Access to westbound traffic only
Tarumi-ku, Kobe	4.9	3.0	2	Myōdani	Hanshin Expressway Bayshore Route / Hyogo Prefecture Route 21	No eastbound exit, no westbound entrance for the Hanshin Expressway; eastern end of Prefecture Route 21 concurrency
Tarumi-ku, Kobe	6.7	4.2	3	Takamaru	Unnamed roads	
Kobe/Akashi border	9.7	6.0	4	Ōkuradani	Hyogo Prefecture Route 21	Western end of Prefecture Route 21 concurrency
Nishi-ku, Kobe	11.9	7.4	5	Ikawadani	Hanshin Expressway Kita-Kobe Route / unnamed road	Eastbound entrance, westbound exit
Nishi-ku, Kobe	15.2	9.4	6	Tamatsu	National Route 175	
Akashi			–	Ishigatani	Kitasen Road	Land acquisition is under way
Akashi	18.2	11.3	SA	Akashi		
Akashi	19.6	12.2	7	Ōkubo	Hyogo Prefecture Route 148	
Akashi	24.1	15.0	TB	Akashi-nishi		
Akashi	24.3	15.1	8	Akashi-nishi	Hyogo Prefecture Route 514	
Through to National Route 2 (Kakogawa Bypass)
1.000 mi = 1.609 km; 1.000 km = 0.621 mi: Concurrency terminus; Incomplete access; Route transition; Unopened

== See also ==
- West Nippon Expressway Company
- National Route 2
