= Shin-Kobe Tunnel =

Expressway in Kobe

Hanshin Expressway Route 32 Shin-Kobe Tunnel 阪神高速32号新神戸トンネル
- Shin-Kobe Tunnel highlighted in red

Route information
- Maintained by Hanshin Expressway Company, Limited
- Length: 8.5 km (5.3 mi)
- Existed: 2012–present

Major junctions
- South end: National Route 2 entrance/exit in Chūō-ku; National Route 2
- North end: Minotai entrance/exit in Kita-ku; Kita-Kobe Route

Location
- Country: Japan

Highway system
- National highways of Japan; Expressways of Japan

The Shin-Kobe Tunnel (新神戸トンネル, Shin-Kōbe Tonneru), signed as Route 32, is one of the expressway routes of the Hanshin Expressway system serving the Keihanshin area. The route travels from National Route 2 in Chūō-ku, Kobe, then tunnels under Mount Rokkō to Kita-ku where it ends at a junction with the Kita-Kobe Route. It has a total length of 8.5 kilometers (5.3 mi).
