= Sky Gate Bridge R =

Two-level bridge to Kansai International Airport in Japan

Sky Gate Bridge R スカイゲートブリッジR
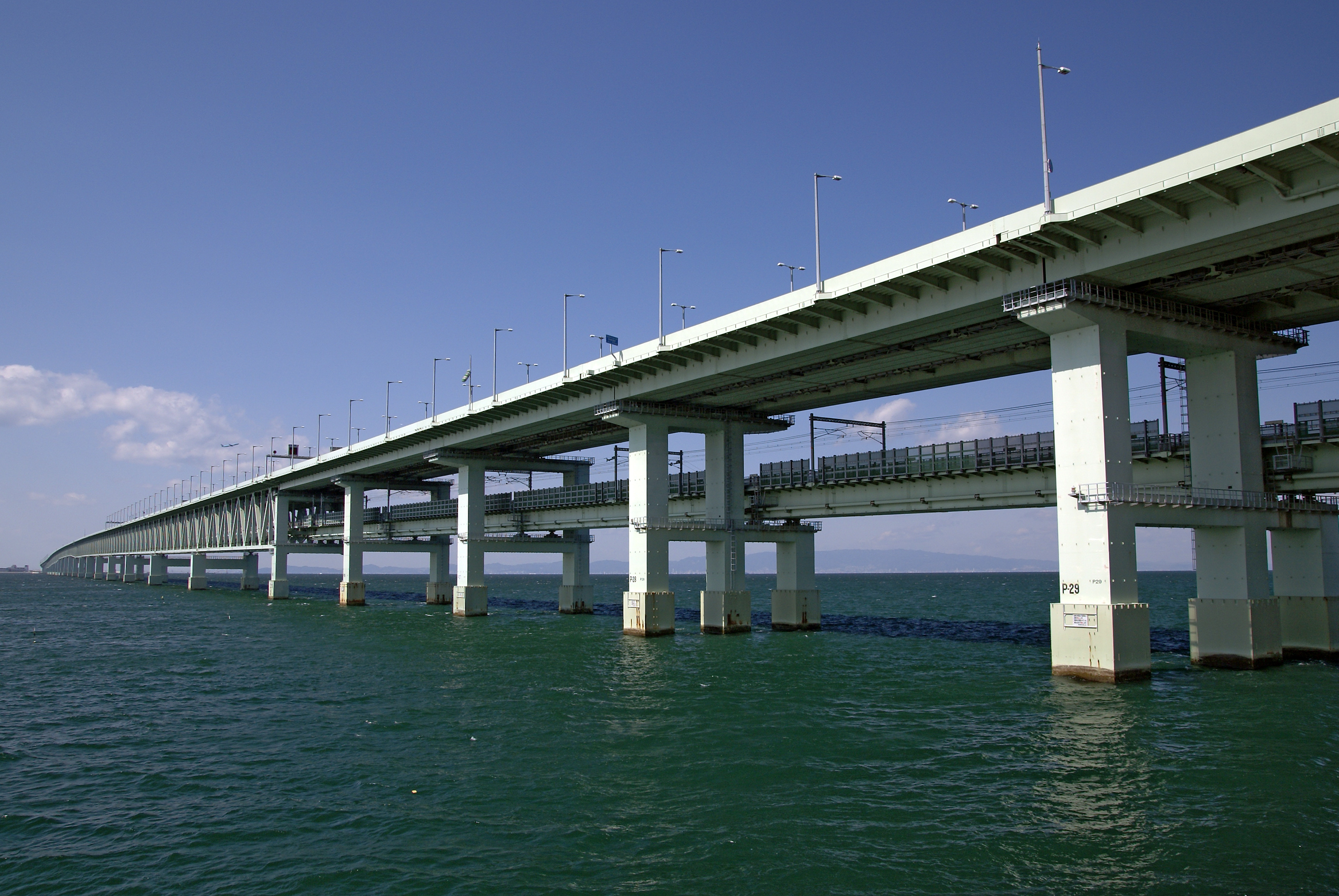
- Coordinates: 34.426333°N 135.278361°E
- Carries: (6 lanes), S Kansai Airport Line, Nankai Airport Line
- Crosses: Osaka Bay
- Locale: Izumisano, Osaka, Japan
- Official name: 関西国際空港連絡橋 (Kansai Kokusai Kūkō Renrakukyō)

Characteristics
- Design: Continuous truss bridge
- Total length: 3,750 m (2.33 mi)
- Width: 29.5 m (96 ft 9 in)
- Height: 25 m (82 ft 0 in)
- Longest span: 150 m (492 ft 2 in)

History
- Opened: 1994

Statistics
- Toll: ¥920

Location
- Interactive map of Sky Gate Bridge R

Kansai International Airport Access Bridge
- 関西国際空港連絡橋

Route information
- Length: 4.6 km (2.9 mi)
- Existed: 2009–present
- Component highways: National Route 481

Major junctions
- South end: Rinku Junction; Hanshin Expressway Bayshore Route; Kansai-Kūkō Expressway in Izumisano, Osaka

Section 1
- North end: Kansai International Airport Interchange in Izumisano, Osaka

Location
- Country: Japan

Highway system
- National highways of Japan; Expressways of Japan

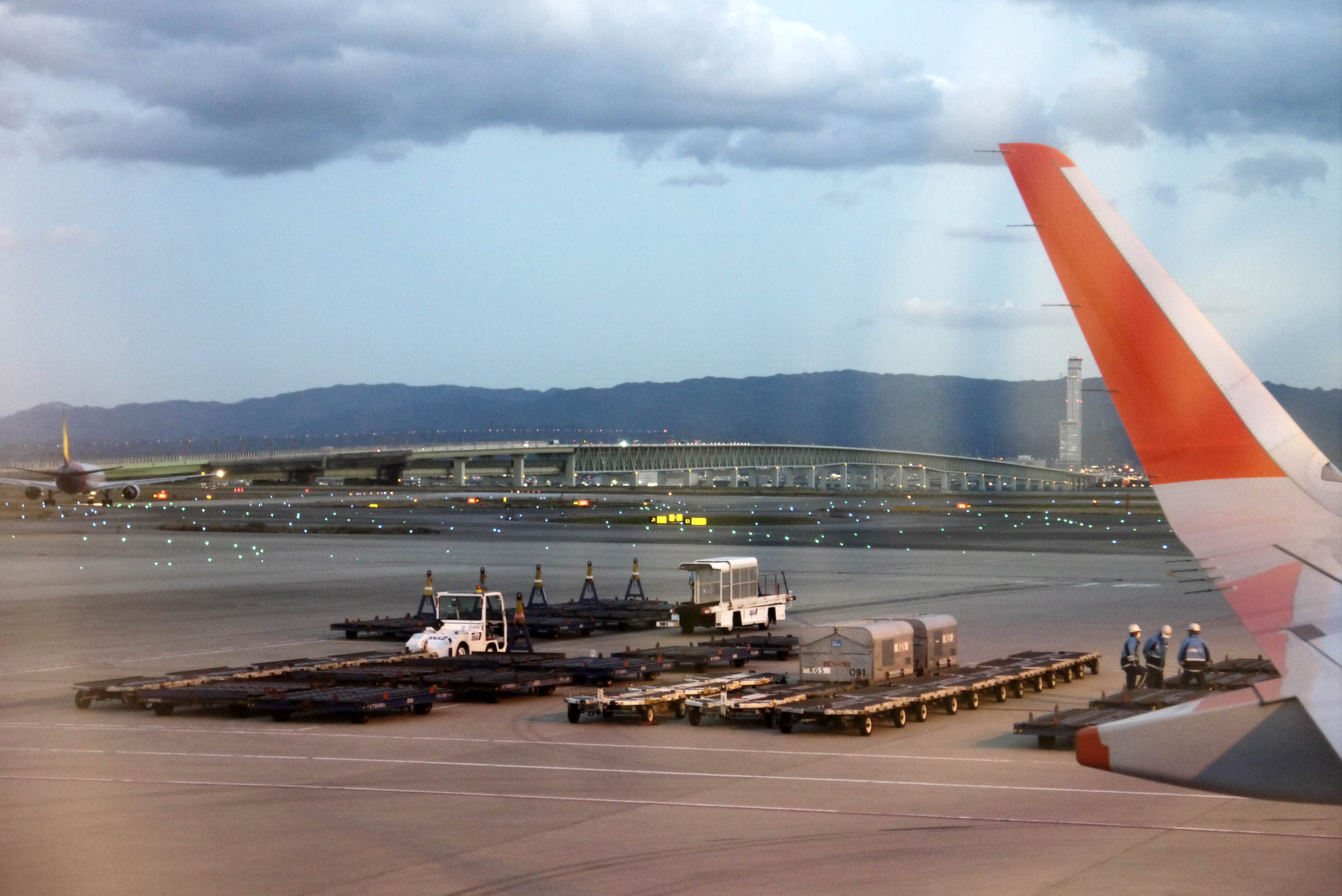
View of Sky Gate Bridge R, pictured from the Airbus A320neo at Kansai Int'l Airport. (November 2013)

Sky Gate Bridge R (スカイゲートブリッジR Sukaigētoburijji R), also known as the Kansai International Airport Access Bridge (関西国際空港連絡橋), serves as a link between the mainland of Osaka, Japan to the artificial island in Osaka Bay on which Kansai International Airport is built. It is the longest double-decked truss bridge in the world. The bridge carries six lanes of automobile traffic on top and two of rail below, over nine truss spans.

== Structural specifications ==
The Sky Gate Bridge is a continuous truss bridge that measures 3.75 km (2.33 mi) long, 29.5 m (96 ft 9 in) wide (6 lanes), and 25 m (82 ft) at its highest point in the center.

== History ==
The bridge commenced construction in June 1987, and was completed in March 1994. On 21 April 2009, management of the expressway portion of the bridge was handed over to the West Nippon Expressway Company. This expressway was numbered E71 alongside the Kansai-Kūkō Expressway in 2016.

=== Typhoon Jebi ===
The bridge was damaged on 4 September 2018 by Typhoon Jebi. A 2600-ton tanker lost power and was blown into one side, severely damaging half of the automobile lanes and the rail lines. The bridge, being the sole link between the airport and the mainland, stranded approximately 3000 passengers and 2000 staff overnight at the airport. They were evacuated the next day via the Kōbe–Kankū Bay Shuttle (神戸-関空ベイ・シャトル) ferry to nearby Kobe Airport, later joined by buses over the undamaged half of the bridge. The bridge was partially reopened to vehicle traffic on 7 March 2019 with four lanes open. The bridge's full capacity with six lanes of traffic was restored on 8 April 2019.

== Junction list ==
The entire expressway is in Osaka Prefecture. The sequence of kilometer posts continue from the Kansai-Kūkō Expressway.

Location	km	mi	Exit	Name	Destinations	Notes
Izumisano	6.6	4.1	3	Rinkū	Hanshin Expressway Bayshore Route – Osaka, Kobe; Kansai-Kūkō Expressway – Osaka, Wakayama	Southern terminus, E71 continues on to the Kansai-Kūkō Expressway
Izumisano	6.6	4.1	4	Rinku	National Route 481 – to National Route 26; Osaka Prefecture Route 29 east – Kaizuka; Osaka Prefecture Route 63 south – Sennan	Northbound entrance, southbound exit; southern end of National Route 481 concurrency
Izumisano	11.2	7.0	5	Kansai International Airport	Kansai Airport – Domestic Cargo, Observation Hall, Terminal, Ferries	Northern terminus of E71 and National Route 481; toll gate
Izumisano	1.000 mi = 1.609 km; 1.000 km = 0.621 mi: Concurrency terminus; Incomplete access; Route transition					
