= Bayshore Route (Port of Osaka-Kansai International Airport) =

Expressway in the Osaka area

Hanshin Expressway Route 4 Bayshore Route 阪神高速4号湾岸線
- The Bayshore Route highlighted in red

Route information
- Maintained by Hanshin Expressway Company, Limited
- Length: 32.7 km (20.3 mi)
- Existed: 1974–present

Major junctions
- North end: Tempozan Junction in Minato-ku, Osaka; Ōsakakō Route; National Route 172
- South end: Rinkū Junction in Izumisano; Kansai-Kūkō Expressway; Sky Gate Bridge R

Location
- Country: Japan

Highway system
- National highways of Japan; Expressways of Japan

The Bayshore Route (湾岸線, Wangan-sen), signed as Route 4, is one of the routes of the Hanshin Expressway system serving the Keihanshin area. It is an intercity route that travels in a north to south direction from Osaka to Izumisano near Kansai International Airport. It has a total length of 32.7 kilometers (20.3 mi).
