= Kitasen Road =

Road in Hyogo prefecture, Japan

Kitasen Road
- 国道%route%号
- 第二神明道路北線 (Daini Shinmei Dōro-Kitasen)

Route information
- Maintained by West Nippon Expressway Company
- Length: 5.6 km (3.5 mi)
- Existed: 1998–present
- Component highways: National Route 2 (Kobe Nishi Bypass)

Major junctions
- East end: Tarumi Junction; Kobe-Awaji-Naruto Expressway in Tarumi-ku, Kobe
- West end: Nagaidani Junction; Hanshin Expressway Kita-Kobe Route in Nishi-ku, Kobe

Location
- Country: Japan

Highway system
- National highways of Japan; Expressways of Japan

The Kitasen Road (北線道路, Kitasen Dōro) or Daini Shinmei Road Kitasen Route (第二神明道路北線, Daini Shinmei Dōro-Kitasen) is an expressway that links the wards Tarumi-ku and Nishi-ku of Kobe, Hyōgo Prefecture, Japan. It is owned and operated by West Nippon Expressway Company and is signed as E94 under the Ministry of Land, Infrastructure, Transport and Tourism's (MLIT) "2016 Proposal for Realization of Expressway Numbering."

== History ==
In 1998, the Kitasen Road was opened in conjunction with the Kobe-Awaji-Naruto Expressway.

== Future ==
MLIT is in the process of acquiring right of way to build a 7.1 km (4.4 mi) extension of the Kitasen Road to link up with the Daini-Shinmei Road in the neighboring city, Akashi.

== Junction list ==
The entire expressway is in Kobe, Hyōgo Prefecture.

Location	km	mi	Exit	Name	Destinations	Notes
Tarumi-ku, Kobe	0.0	0.0	3	Tarumi	Kobe-Awaji-Naruto Expressway	Eastern terminus
Tarumi-ku, Kobe	2.3	1.4	11	Gakuen-minami	Hyogo Prefecture Route 488	Eastbound exit, westbound entrance
Nishi-ku, Kobe	3.0	1.9	12	Nagasaka	National Route 2 (Kobe Nishi Bypass)	Eastbound entrance, westbound exit
Nishi-ku, Kobe	5.6	3.5	7-02	Nagaidani	Hanshin Expressway Kita-Kobe Route	Current western terminus
Through to Daini-Shinmei Road (under construction)
1.000 mi = 1.609 km; 1.000 km = 0.621 mi: Incomplete access

== See also ==
- Daini-Shinmei Road
- West Nippon Expressway Company
