= Japan National Route 481 =

Road in Osaka prefecture, Japan

National Route 481
- 国道481号
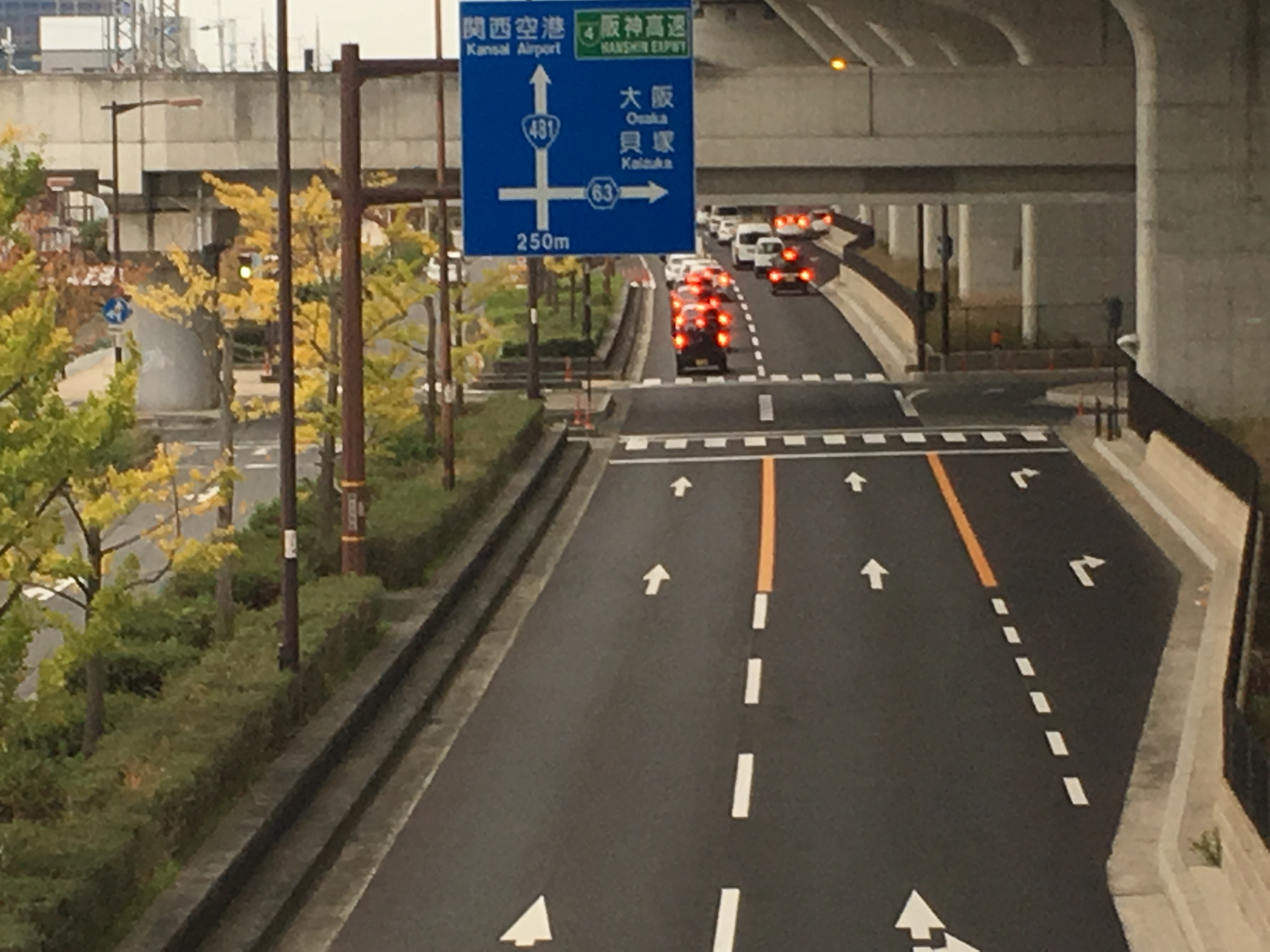

Route information
- Length: 5.8 km (3.6 mi)

Location
- Country: Japan

Highway system
- National highways of Japan; Expressways of Japan
← National Route 480	→ National Route 482

National Route 481 is a national highway of Japan connecting Kansai International Airport and Izumisano, Osaka in Japan with a total length of 5.8 km (3.6 mi).
