= Japan National Route 43 =

National highway in Japan

National Route 43
- 国道43号

Route information
- Length: 30.2 km (18.8 mi)
- Existed: 30 September 1958–present

Major junctions
- West end: National Route 2 in Nada-ku, Kobe
- East end: National Route 26 in Nishinari-ku, Osaka

Location
- Country: Japan

Highway system
- National highways of Japan; Expressways of Japan
← National Route 42	→ National Route 44

National Route 43 is a national highway of Japan connecting Nishinari-ku, Osaka, and Nada-ku, Kobe.

== History ==
Route 43 was originally designated on 18 May 1953 as National Route 173, and this was redesignated as Route 43 when the route was promoted to a Class 1 highway.

== Route data ==
- Length: 30.2 km (18.77 mi).
