= Hanshin Expressway =

Highway network in Osaka, Kobe, and Kyoto in Japan

- Highway markers for the Loop Route, the Kobe Route, and the Shin-Kobe Tunnel

- The Hanshin Expressway network in Keihanshin

System information
- Maintained by Hanshin Expressway Company, Limited
- Length: 239.3 km (148.7 mi)
- Formed: 1 May 1962

Highway names

System links
- National highways of Japan; Expressways of Japan

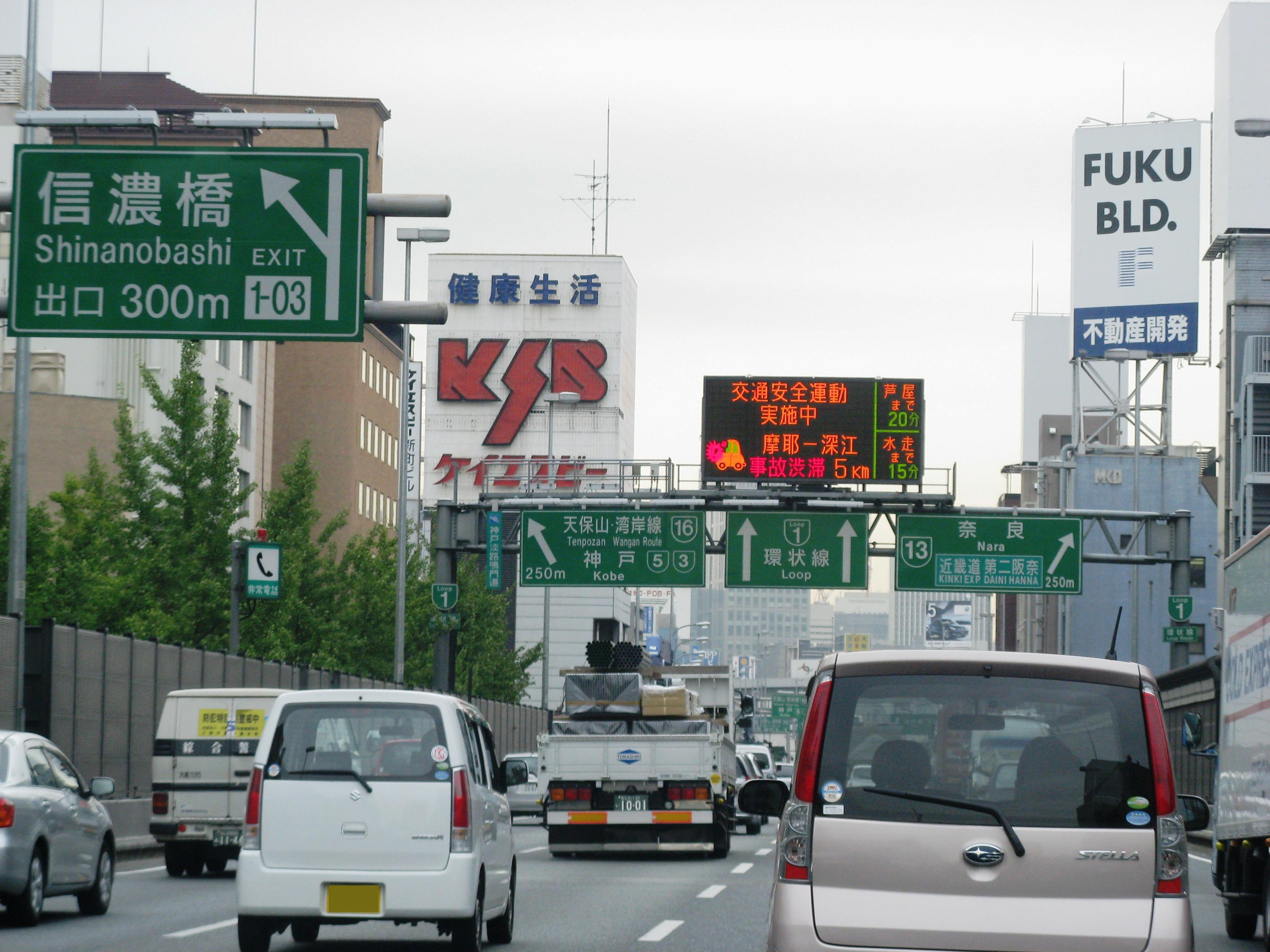
The Loop Route of the Hanshin Expressway at Shinanobashi, Osaka

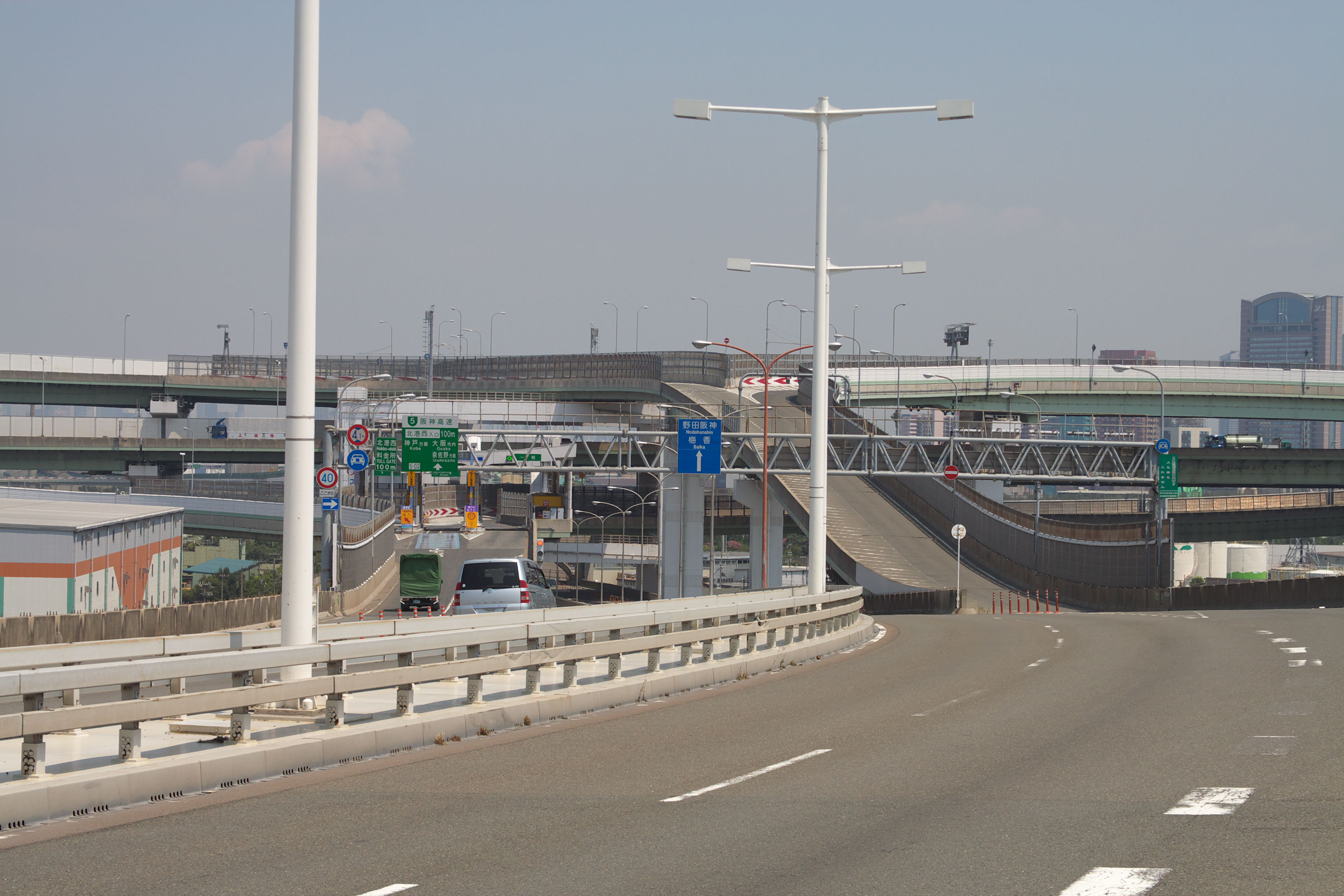
Hanshin Expressway in Osaka

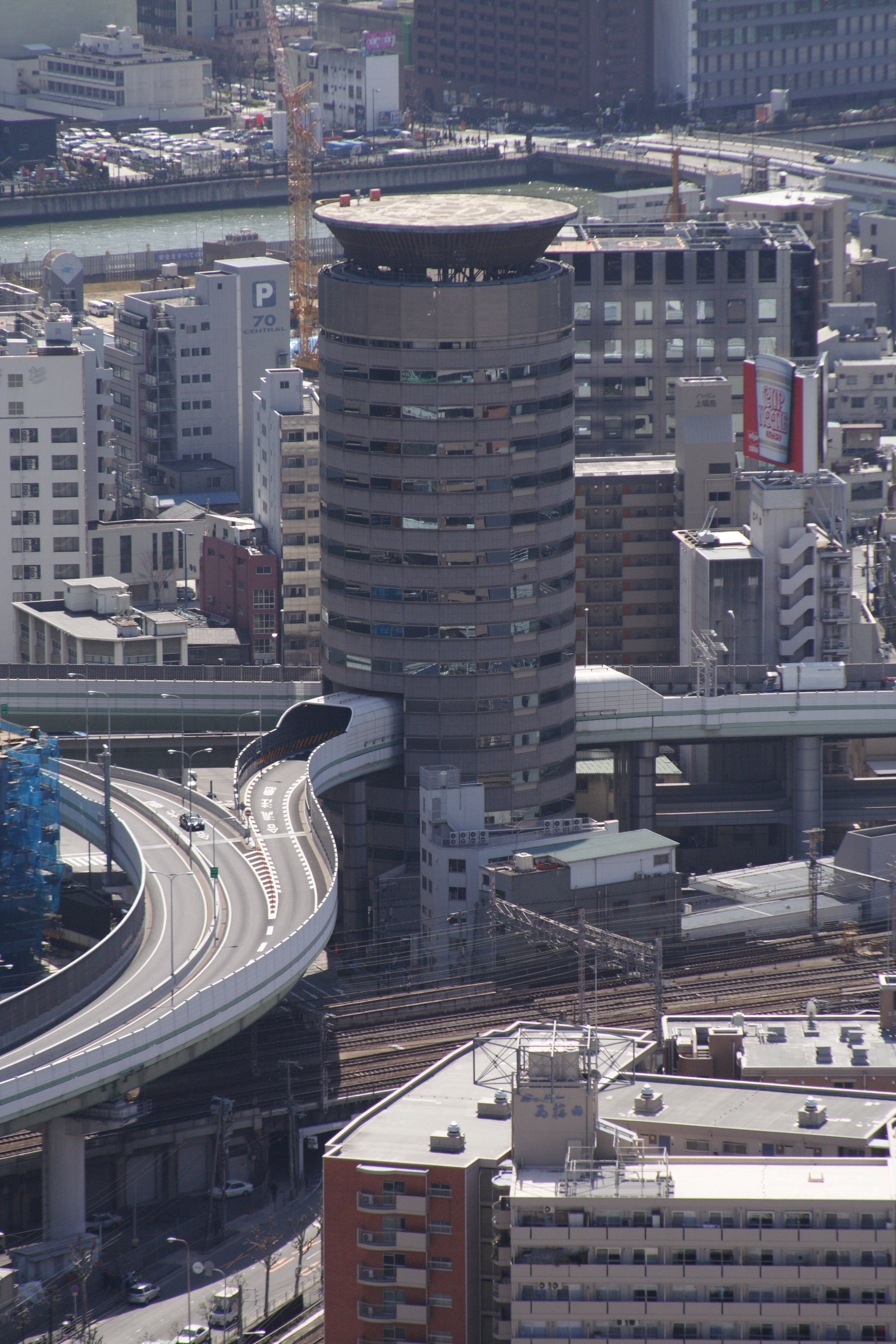
Gate Tower Building, with the Ikeda Route of the Hanshin Expressway going through the 5th-7th floors

The Hanshin Expressway (阪神高速道路, Hanshin Kōsoku Dōro, Japanese pronunciation: [haɰ̃.ɕiŋ koː.so.kɯ doꜜː.ɾo]) is a 239.3-kilometer-long (148.7 mi) network of expressways surrounding Osaka, Kobe and Kyoto, Japan.

== History ==
Operated by Hanshin Expressway Company, Limited (阪神高速道路株式会社, Hanshin Kōsoku-dōro Kabushiki-gaisha), it opened in 1962.

Portions of the Hanshin Expressway about 400 meters (1,300 ft) east of Fukae Station collapsed during the Kobe earthquake on 17 January 1995. These sections were rebuilt with more modern standards by 1996. Portions of the Osaka highway are featured in Tokyo Xtreme Racer 3, and the Wangan Midnight Maximum Tune video games from 3 onwards.

== Routes ==
- 1 - Loop Route (Central Osaka)
- 2 - Yodogawa-Sagan Route (Hokko-kita - Universal Studios Japan)
- 3 - Kobe Route (Nishi-Nagahori - Amagasaki - Nishinomiya - Kobe)
- 4 - Bayshore Route (Osakako - Rinku Town, Kansai Airport)
- 5 - Bayshore Route (Osakako - Rokko Island)
- 6 - Yamatogawa Route (Sakai - Matsubara)
- 7 - Kita-Kobe Route (Igawadani - Shirakawa - Minotani - Arima - Nishinomiya-Yamaguchi)
- 11 - Ikeda Route (Umeda - Toyonaka - Osaka Airport - Kawanishi - Ikeda)
- 12 - Moriguchi Route (Kitahama - Moriguchi)
- 13 - Higashi-Osaka Route (Central Osaka - Higashi-Osaka)
- 14 - Matsubara Route (Namba - Hirano - Matsubara)
- 15 - Sakai Route (Sumiyoshi - Suminoe - Sakai)
- 16 - Ōsakakō Route (Nishi-Nagahori - Osakako)
- 17 - Nishi-Osaka Route (Bentencho - Sumiyoshi)
- 31 - Kobe-Yamate Route (Kobe - Shirakawa)
- 32 - Shin-Kobe Tunnel (National Highway Route 2 - Minotani)

=== Former Hanshin route ===
- 8 - Kyoto Route (Fushimi - Yamashina) (transferred to West Nippon Expressway Company and Kyoto City, renamed to E89 Second Keihan Highway southwest of Kamogawa-Higashi interchange, and Shinjūjōdōri (Japanese: 新十条通) east of same IC (also free opened))
