= Keihanshin =

Metropolitan region in the Kansai region of Japan

Keihanshin Kyoto–Osaka–Kobe Kinki MMA
- Major metropolitan area of Japan
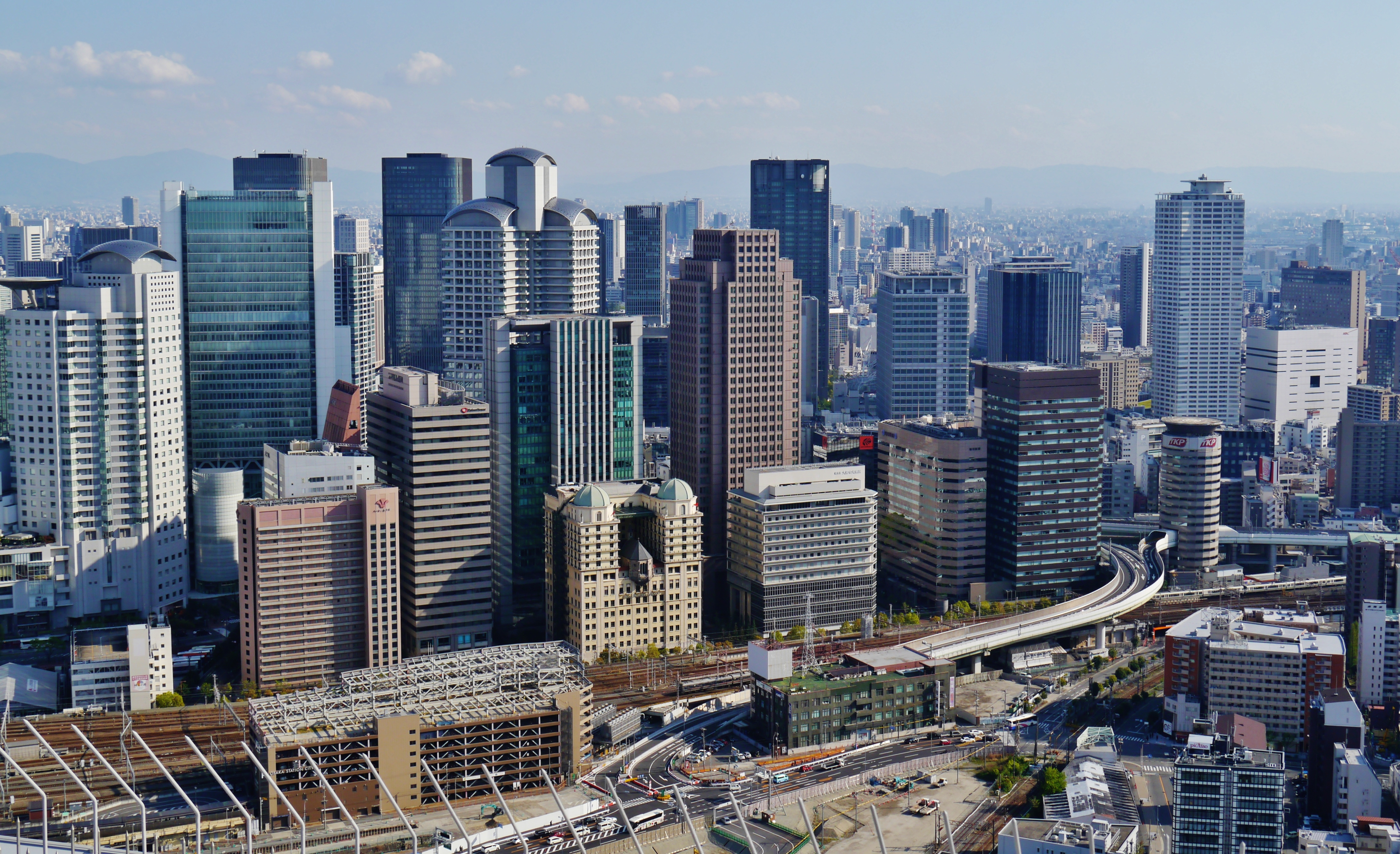
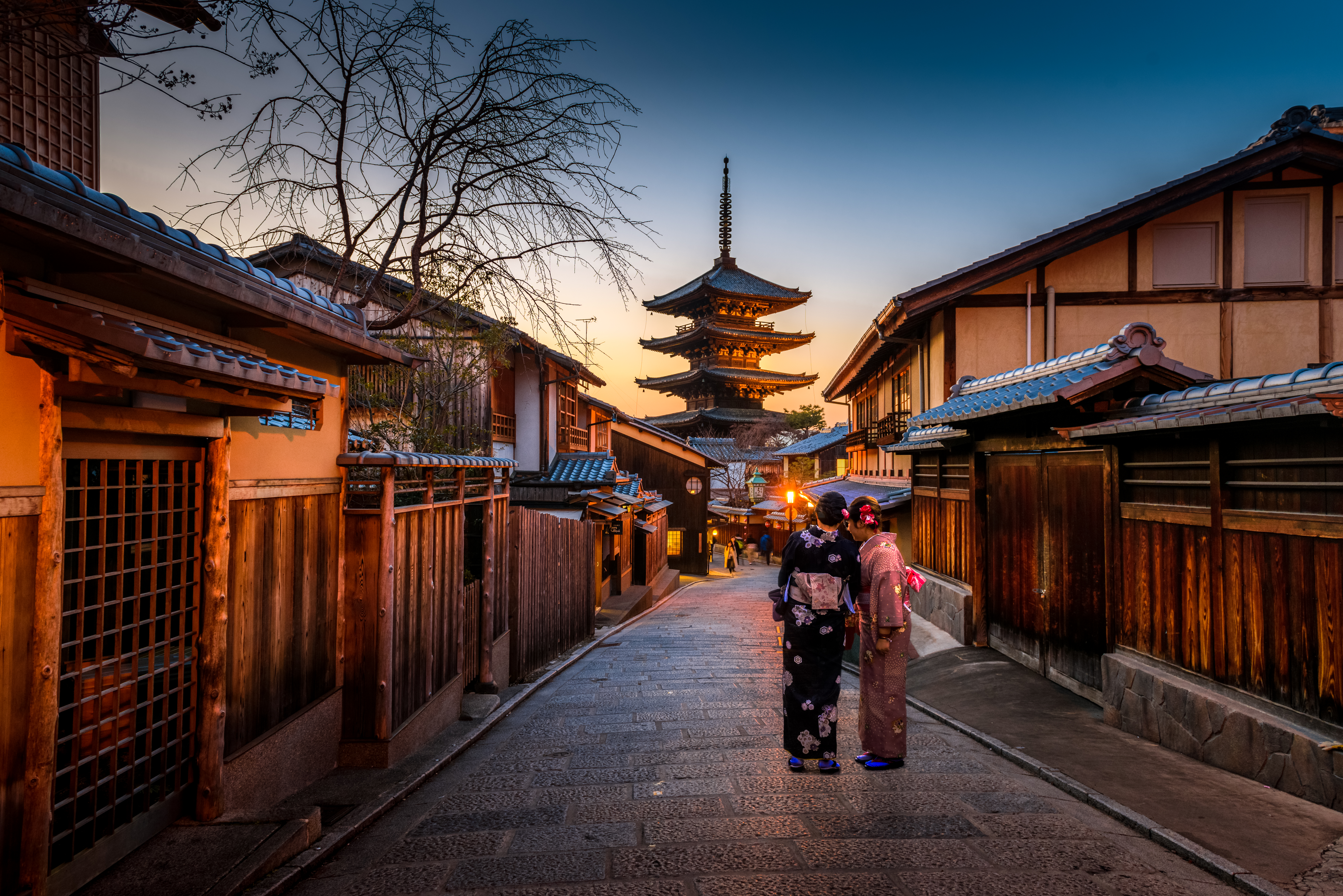
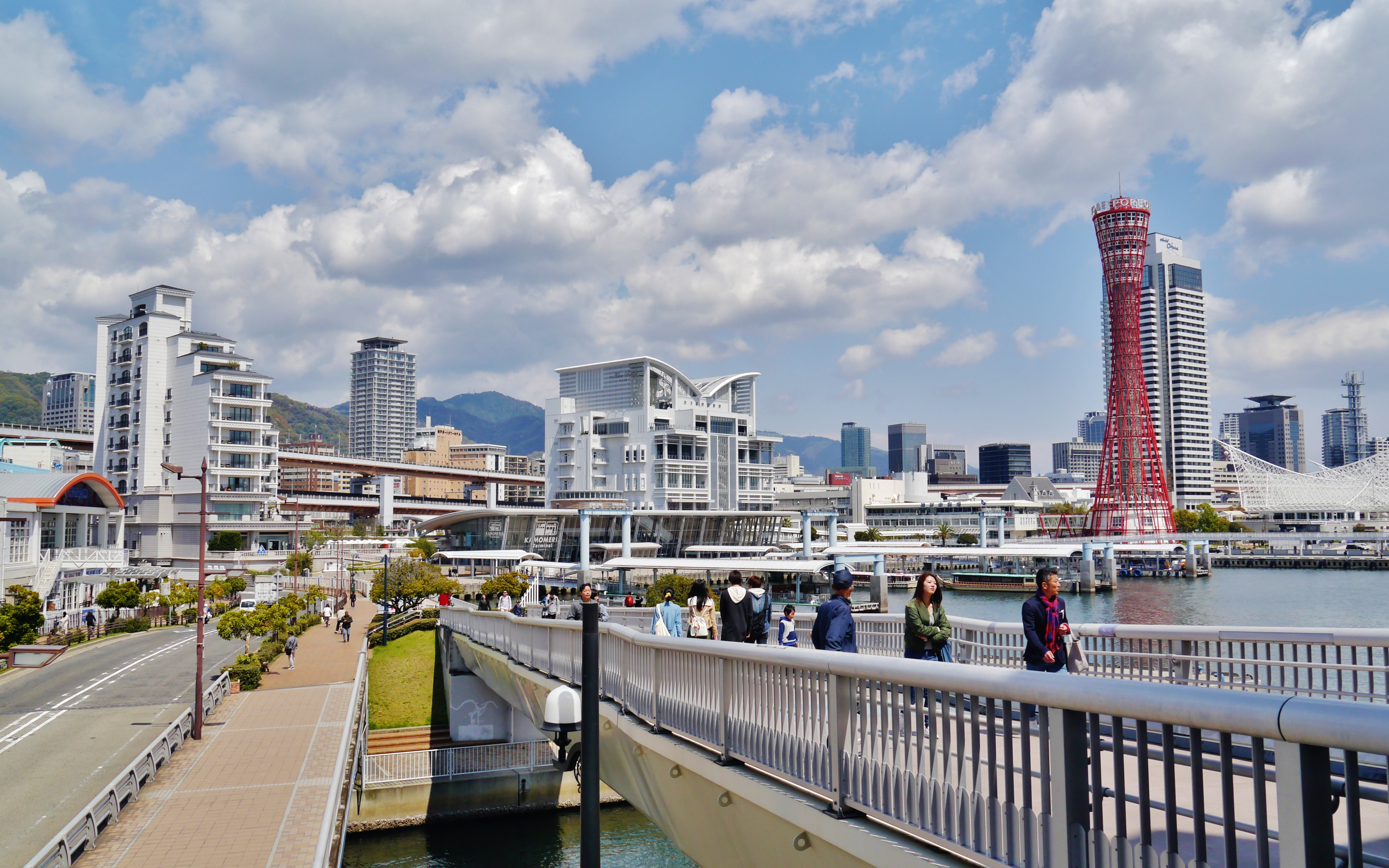
- Osaka Sakai Kyoto Kobe

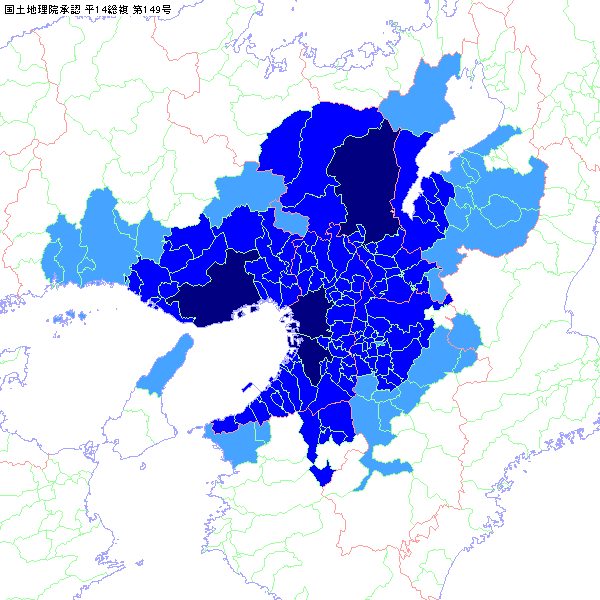
- Keihanshin Major Metropolitan Area
- Coordinates: 34°50′N 135°30′E
- Country: Japan
- Prefectures: Kyoto; Osaka; Hyōgo

Area
  - Metro: 13,228 km^{2} (5,107 sq mi)

Population (2022)
  - Metro: 20,352,734
  - Metro density: 1,538.6/km^{2} (3,985.0/sq mi)

GDP (nominal, 2022)
  - Metro: US$685 billion
  - Per capita: US$33,656

Keihanshin (京阪神; Japanese pronunciation: [kei.haꜜɰ̃.ɕiɴ, keː-], lit. 'Kyoto–Osaka–Kobe') is a metropolitan region in the Kansai region of Japan encompassing the metropolitan areas of the cities of Kyoto in Kyoto Prefecture, Osaka in Osaka Prefecture and Kobe in Hyōgo Prefecture. The entire region has a population (as of 2015) of 19,302,746 over an area of 13,228 km^{2} (5,107 sq mi). It is the second-most-populated urban region in Japan (after the Greater Tokyo Area), containing approximately 15% of Japan's population.

The GDP in Osaka–Kobe is $681 billion as measured by PPP as of 2015, making it one of the world's most productive regions, a match with Paris and London. MasterCard Worldwide reported that Osaka is the 19th ranking city of the world's leading global cities and has an instrumental role in driving the global economy. If Keihanshin were a country, it would be the 16th-largest economy in the world, with a GDP of nearly $953.9 billion in 2012.

Prefecture	GDP (in billion JP¥, 2022)	GDP (in billion US$, 2022)	Population (2022)	GDP per capita (US$, 2022)
Osaka	43,124	319	8,782,484	36,271
Hyōgo	23,463	173	5,402,493	32,081
Kyoto	11,108	82	2,549,749	32,180
Shiga	7,006	52	1,408,931	36,731
Wakayama	3,996	30	903,265	32,679
Nara	3,921	29	1,305,812	22,181
Keihanshin	92,618	685	20,352,734	33,656

== Name ==
The name Keihanshin is constructed by extracting a representative kanji from Kyoto (京都), Osaka (大阪), and Kobe (神戸). For the characters taken from Osaka and Kobe, the Chinese reading is used instead of the corresponding native reading. For the character taken from Kyoto, the Kan-on Chinese reading is used instead of the usual Go-on Chinese reading.

== Definitions ==
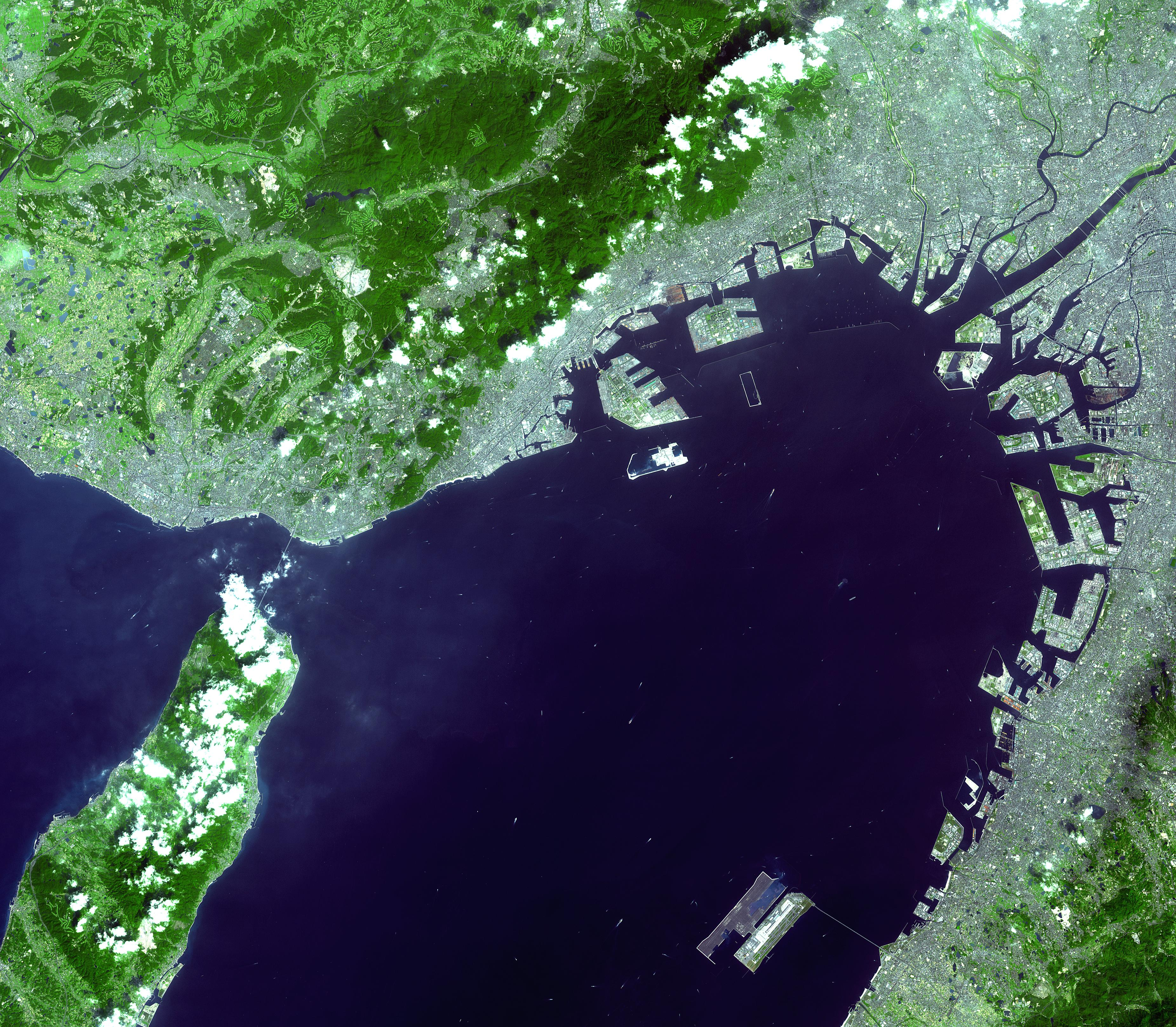
Osaka Bay

=== Major Metropolitan Area ===
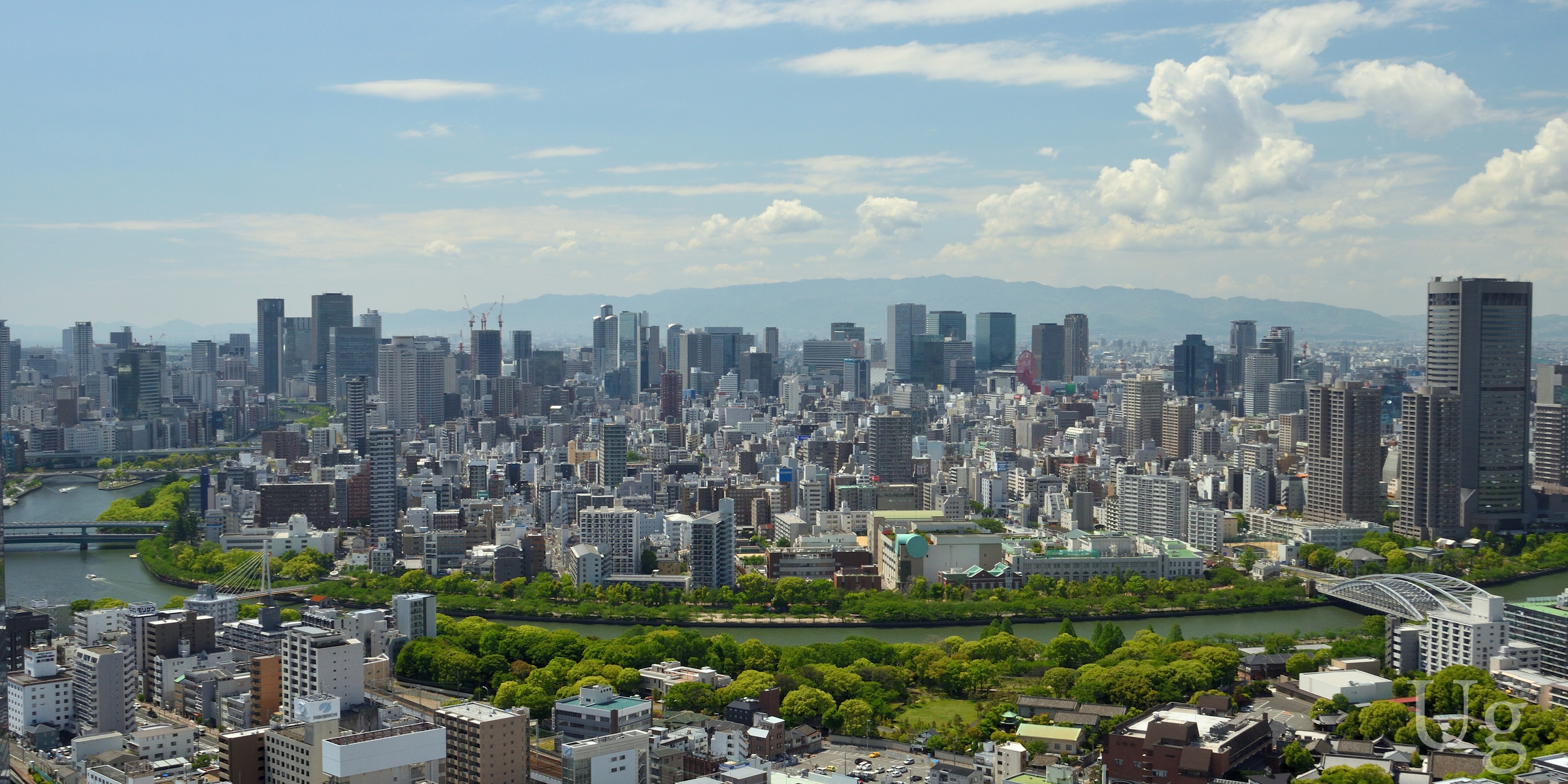
Osaka

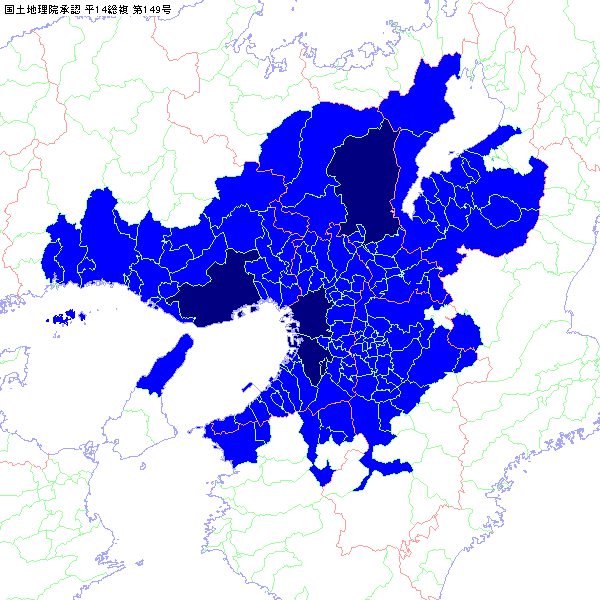
Keihanshin MMA as of 2015 with core cities in dark blue: Osaka, Sakai, Kyoto, Kobe

The Japan Statistics Bureau defines a Major Metropolitan Area or MMA (大都市圏) as a set of municipalities where at least 1.5% of the resident population aged 15 and above commute to school or work in a designated city (defined as the core area). If multiple designated cities are close enough to have overlapping outlying areas, they are combined into a single multi-core area. In the 2005 census, the designated cities used to define the Keihanshin MMA were Osaka, Kobe, and Kyoto. Sakai has subsequently become a designated city.

This region consists of the combination of the metropolitan areas of Osaka, Kobe, Kyoto, and Himeji, and additionally includes several periurban areas (particularly in eastern Shiga Prefecture) that are not part of the four metropolitan areas.

As of 2015, the entire Keihanshin region had a population of 19,302,746 over an area of 13,228 square kilometres (5,107 square miles).

=== Range of distance ===
The Japan Statistics Bureau defines the set of municipalities that are entirely or mostly within 50 kilometres (31 miles) of the Municipal Office of Osaka as one measure of the metropolitan area. As of 2015, the population for this region was 16,260,117.

=== Urban Employment Area ===
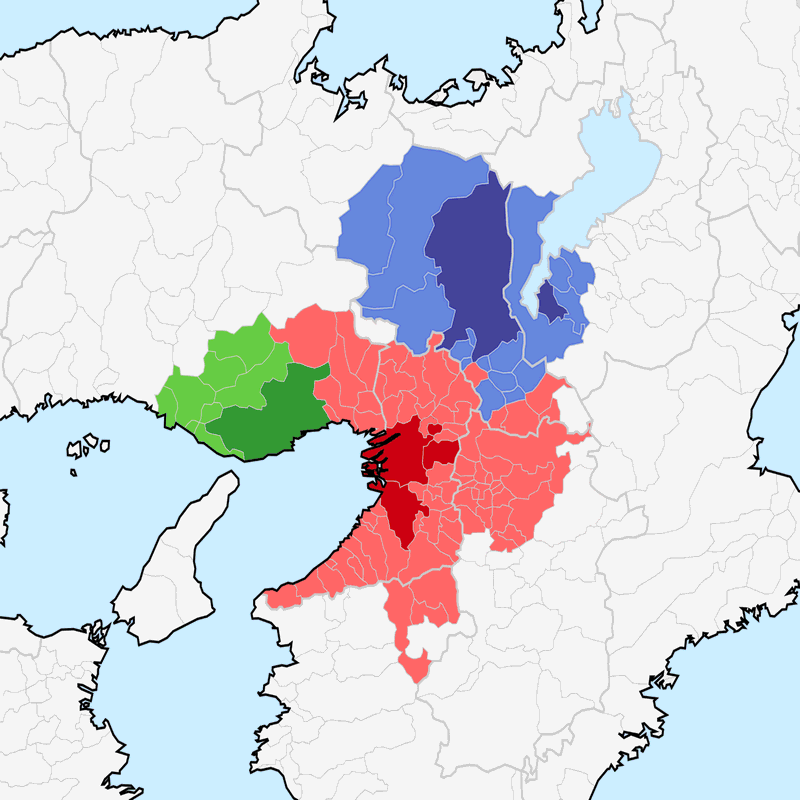
Keihanshin map with Osaka, Kobe, and Kyoto Urban Employment Areas as of 2015.

The Urban Employment Area is a metropolitan area definition developed at the Faculty of Economics of the University of Tokyo. This definition is comparable to the Metropolitan Statistical Area in the United States. The basic building blocks are municipalities.

The core area is the set of municipalities that contain a densely inhabited district (DID) with a population of 10,000 or more. The Urban Employment Area is called Metropolitan Employment Area, when its core area has 50,000 DID population or more. Otherwise, the area is called Micropolitan Employment Area. A DID is a group of census enumeration districts inhabited at densities of 4,000 or more persons per km^{2}. Outlying areas are those municipalities where 10% or more of the employed population work in the core area or in another outlying area. Overlaps are not allowed and an outlying area is assigned to the core area where it has the highest commuter ratio.

This definition assigns a Metropolitan Employment Area to the following cities of the Keihanshin region: Osaka, Kobe, Kyoto, Himeji, and Wakayama. The lists below indicate which cities belong to which metropolitan area. Towns and villages are not listed.

==== Osaka MEA ====
Osaka metropolitan area Osaka MEA
- Urban Employment Area
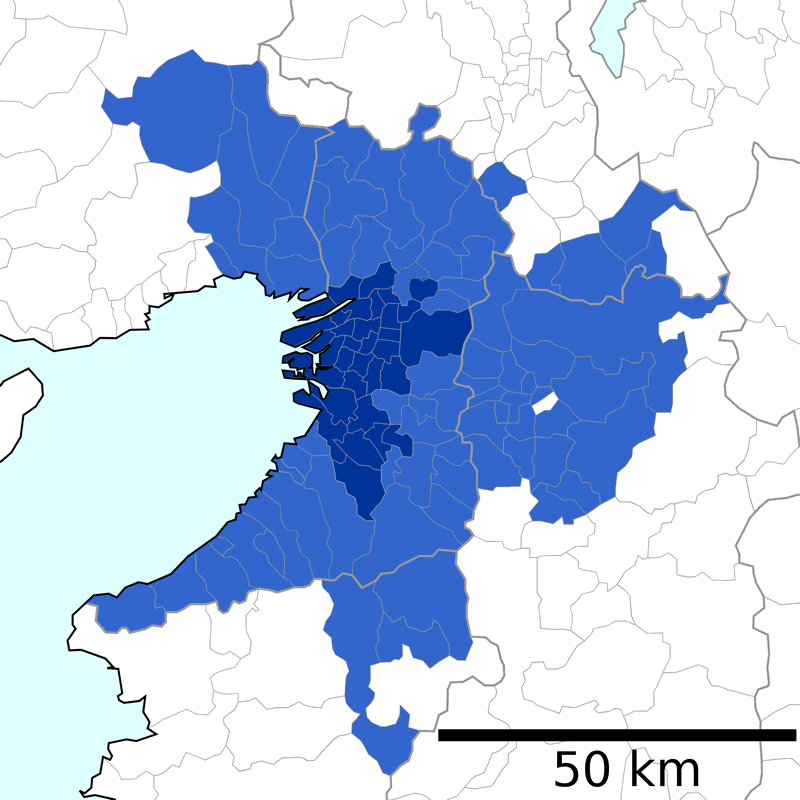
- (2015)
- Interactive map of Osaka metropolitan area
- Prefectures: Kyoto Prefecture; Osaka Prefecture; Hyōgo Prefecture; Nara Prefecture; Wakayama Prefecture
- Core cities: Osaka; Sakai; Kadoma; Higashiōsaka

Area (2011)
  - Total: 4,291.37 km^{2} (1,656.91 sq mi)
  - Inhabitable area: 2,509.71 km^{2} (969.00 sq mi)

Population (2015)
  - Total: 12,078,820
  - Rank: 2nd in Japan
  - Density: 2,814.68/km^{2} (7,289.98/sq mi)
- GDP (nominal): 45.4 trillion Japanese yen (2010)

The Osaka Metropolitan Employment Area has a population (as of 2015) of 12,078,820 and consists of the following cities:

- Core cities: Osaka, Sakai, Kadoma, Higashiōsaka
- Outlying cities
  - Osaka Prefecture (entire prefecture)
  - Hyōgo Prefecture (southeastern part): Amagasaki, Nishinomiya, Ashiya, Itami, Takarazuka, Kawanishi, Sanda
  - Nara Prefecture (northern part): Nara, Tenri, Yamatotakada, Yamatokōriyama, Kashihara, Sakurai, Ikoma, Kashiba, Katsuragi
  - Other cities: Yawata (Kyoto), Hashimoto (Wakayama)

==== Kyoto MEA ====
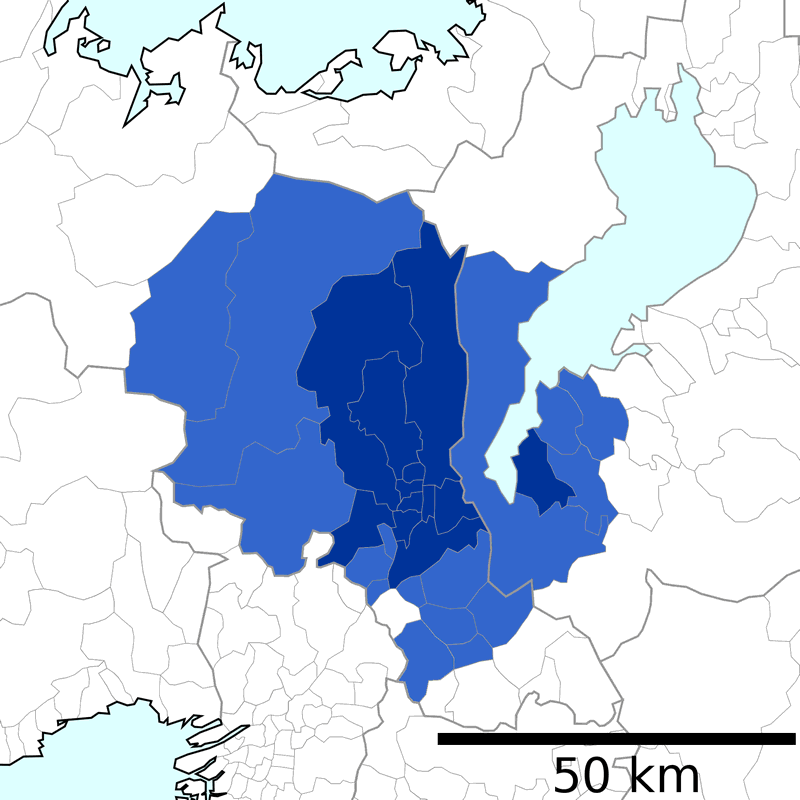
A map of Kyoto metropolitan area as of 2015

The Kyoto Metropolitan Employment Area has a population (as of 2015) of 2,801,044 and consists of the following cities:

- Core cities: Kyoto, Kusatsu
- Outlying cities
  - Kyoto Prefecture (southern part): Uji, Kameoka, Joyo, Muko, Nagaokakyo, Kyotanabe
  - Shiga Prefecture (southwestern part): Otsu, Moriyama

==== Kobe MEA ====
A map of Kobe metropolitan employment area as of 2015

The Kobe Metropolitan Employment Area has a population (as of 2015) of 2,565,501 and consists of the following cities:

- Core cities: Kobe
- Outlying cities
  - Hyōgo Prefecture (southern part): Akashi, Kakogawa, Takasago, Miki, and Ono
  - Hyōgo Prefecture (southeastern part): Amagasaki, Nishinomiya, Ashiya, Itami, Takarazuka, Kawanishi, Sanda

==== Himeji MEA ====
A map of Himeji metropolitan employment area as of 2010

The Himeji Metropolitan Employment Area has a population (as of 2015) of 773,389 and consists of the following cities:

- Core cities: Himeji
- Outlying cities
- Hyōgo Prefecture (southwestern part): Aioi, Tatsuno
- Hyōgo Prefecture (southern part): Akashi, Kakogawa, Takasago, Miki, and Ono

==== Wakayama MEA ====
A map of Wakayama metropolitan employment area as of 2010

The Wakayama Metropolitan Employment Area has a population (as of 2015) of 569,758 and consists of the following cities:

- Core cities: Wakayama
- Outlying cities
  - Wakayama Prefecture (northwestern part): Kainan

== Historical demographics of Keihanshin ==
Per Japanese census data, Keihanshin, also known as Greater Osaka, has had continuous population throughout the 20th century. From 1960 to 2010 the population nearly doubled from 10.6 million to 19.3 million. Beginning at around 2010, Keihanshin has experienced a small population decline.

Keihanshin
Year	Population
1950	7,005,000
1960	10,615,000
1970	15,272,000
1980	17,028,000
1990	18,389,000
2000	18,660,180
2010	19,341,976
2020	19,223,980

== Cities ==
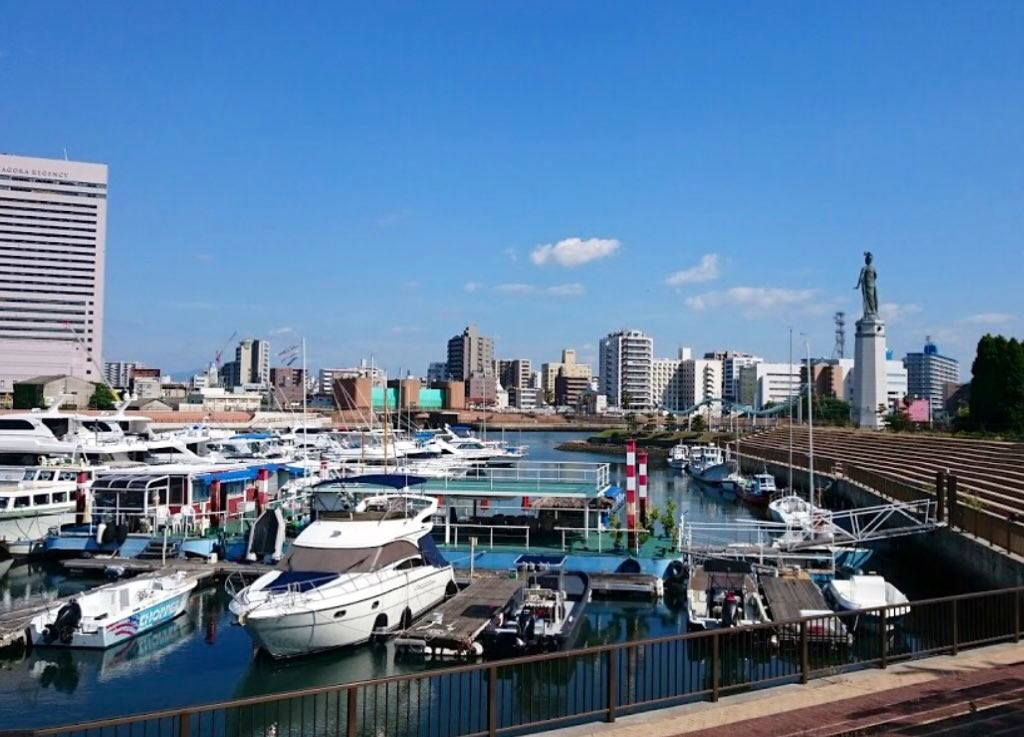
Sakai

=== Core cities ===
The core cities formed Keihanshin are government ordinance cities. These cities designated the three largest cities as special cities with Tokyo in 1889. Kobe designated the six largest cities as special cities in 1922, and adopted the ward system in 1931. Following World War II, the six largest cities was replaced by the government designated city system in 1956. Afterwards, Sakai became a government designated city in 2006.

The core cities of Keihanshin are:

- Osaka (population 2.75 million)
- Kobe (population 1.53 million)
- Kyoto (population 1.46 million)
- Sakai (population 826,447)

=== Other cities within the area ===
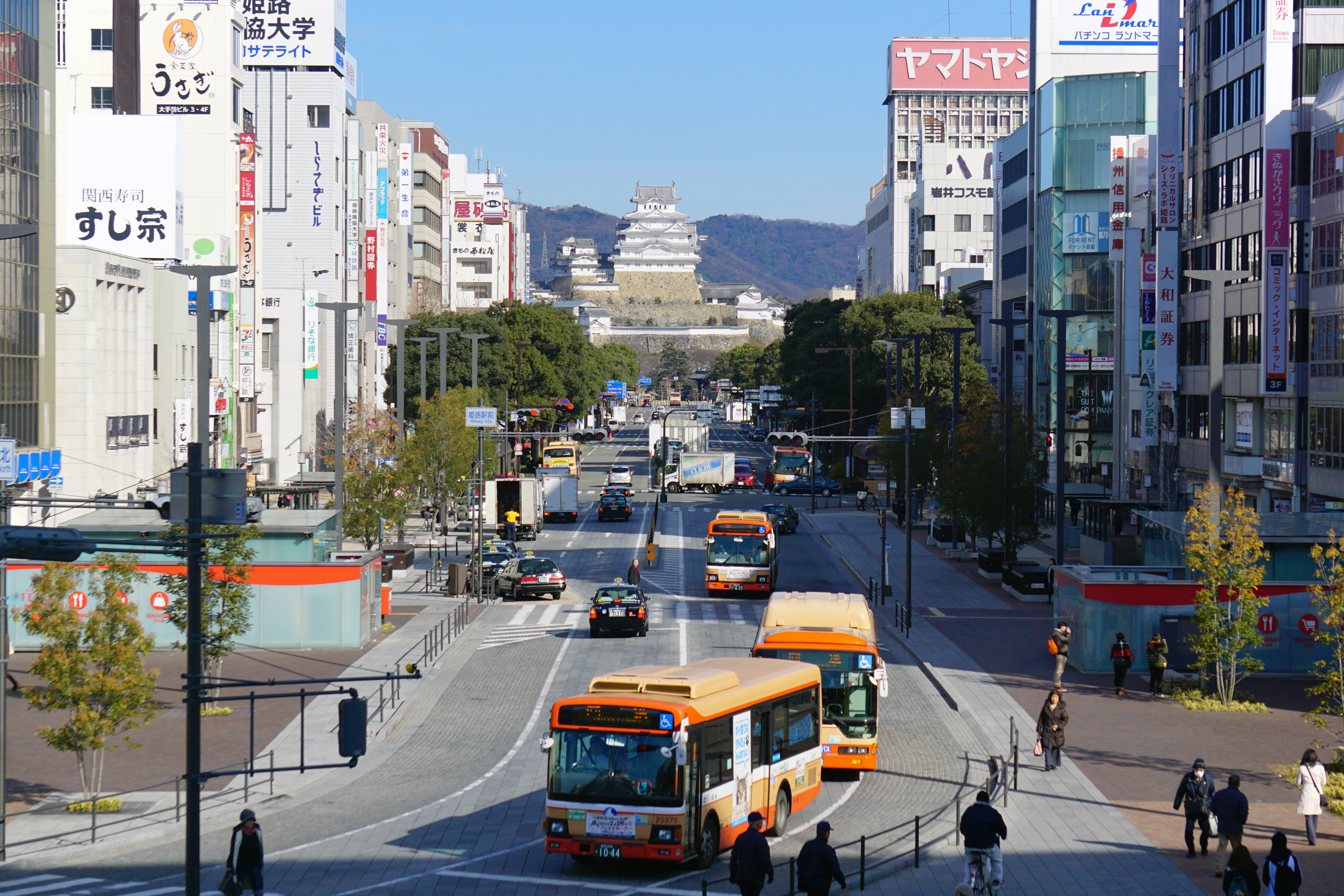
Himeji

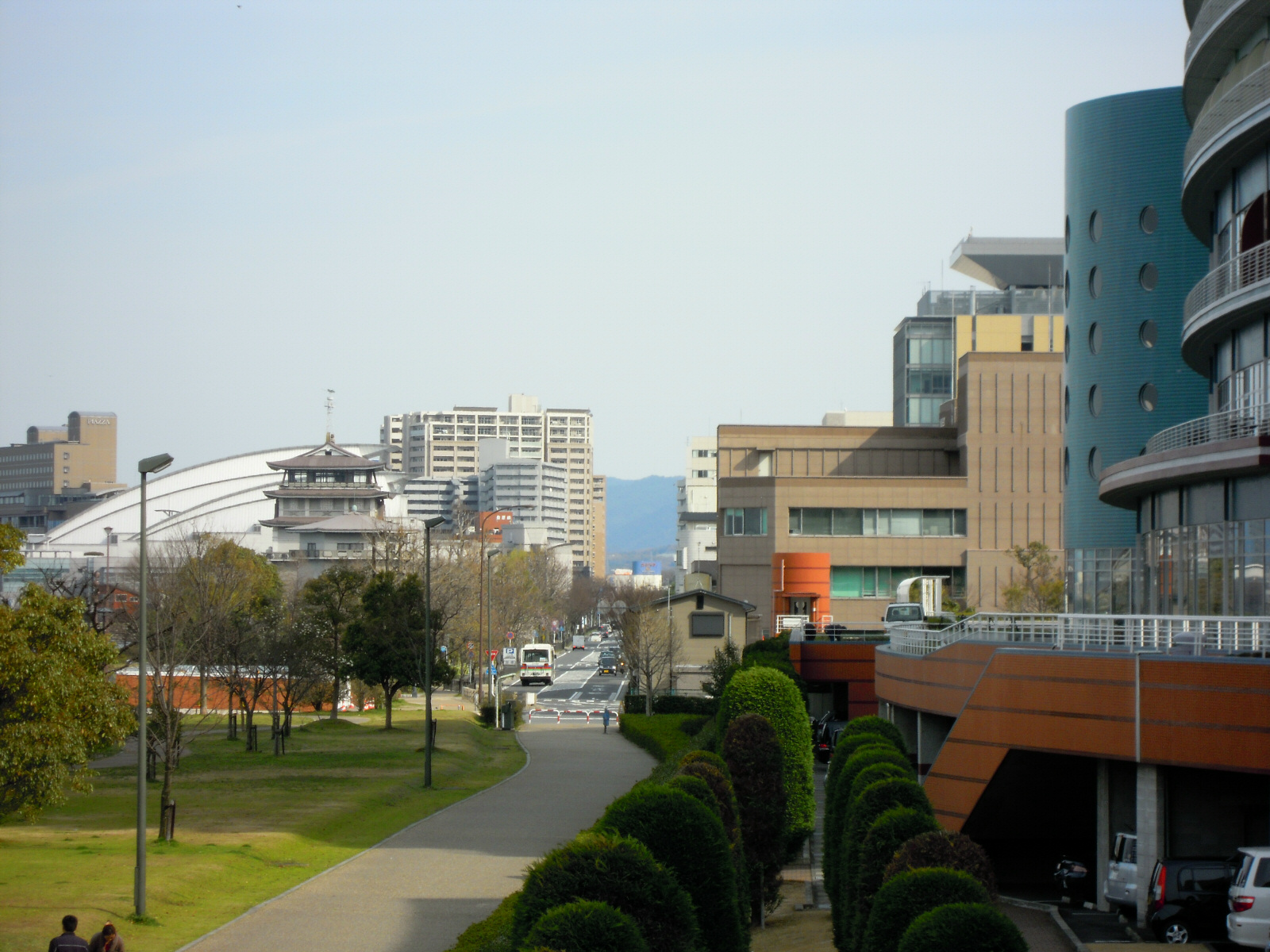
Ōtsu

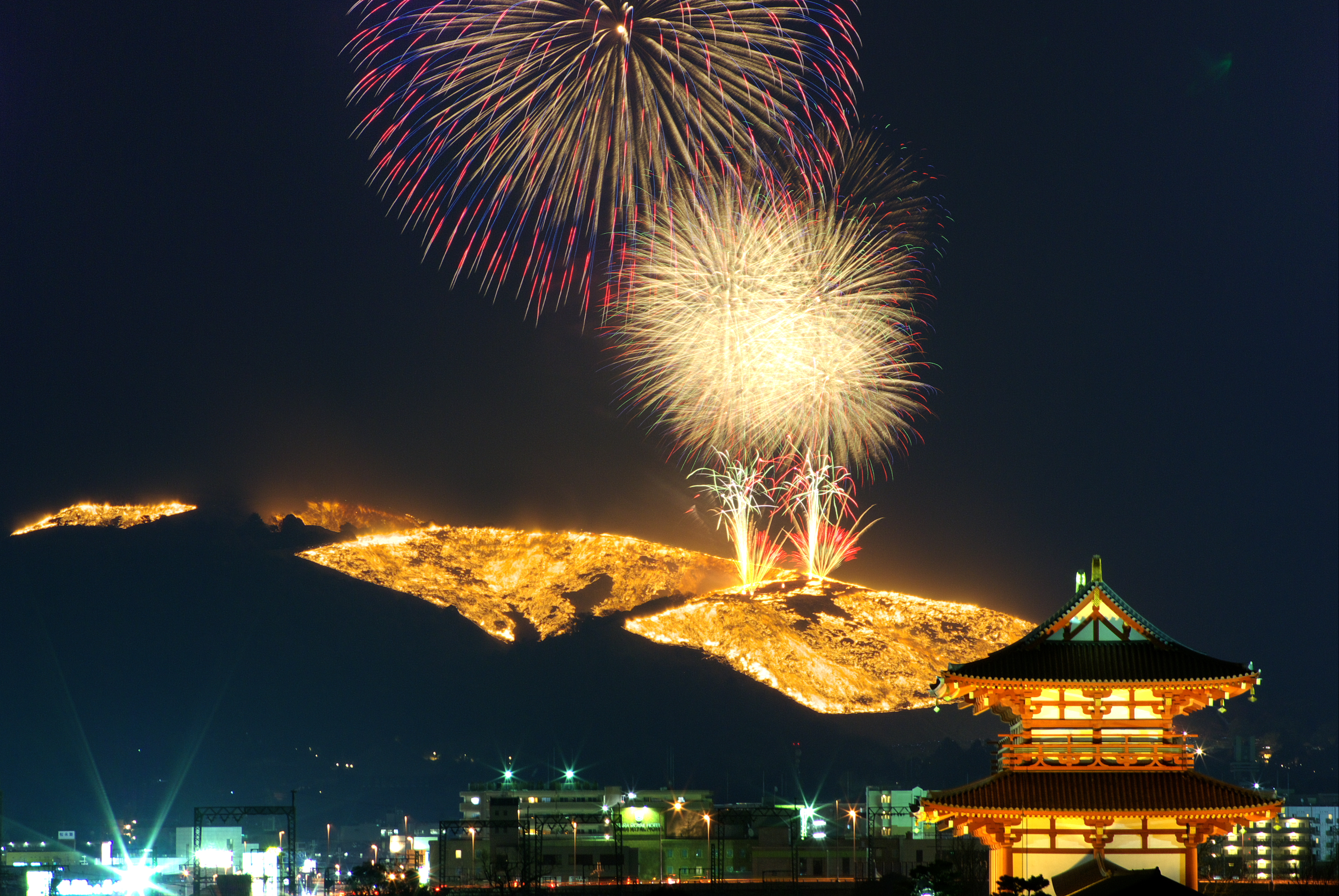
Nara

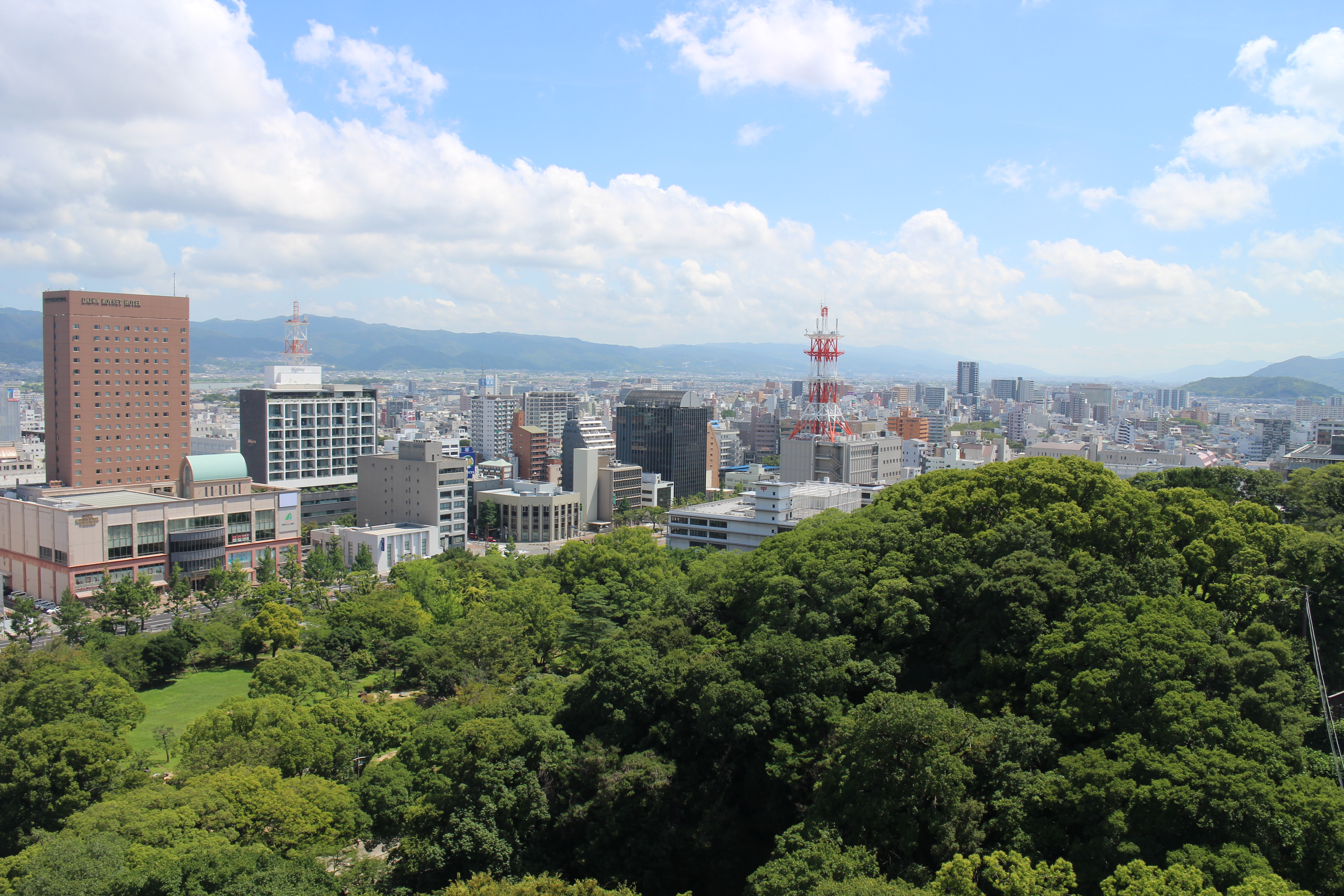
Wakayama

The other cities in the prefectures of Osaka, Hyōgo, Kyoto and Nara include:

- Aioi
- Akashi
- Amagasaki (pop 460,000)
- Ashiya
- Awaji
- Daitō
- Fujiidera
- Habikino
- Hannan
- Higashiōsaka (pop 490,000)
- Himeji (pop 530,000)
- Hirakata (pop 400,000)
- Ibaraki
- Ikeda
- Itami
- Izumi
- Izumiōtsu
- Izumisano
- Jōyō
- Kadoma
- Kaizuka
- Kakogawa
- Kameoka
- Kasai
- Kashiwara
- Katano
- Katō
- Kawachinagano
- Kawanishi
- Kishiwada
- Kizugawa
- Kyōtanabe
- Matsubara
- Miki
- Minoh
- Moriguchi
- Mukō
- Nagaokakyō
- Nantan
- Neyagawa
- Nishinomiya (pop 490,000)
- Ono
- Ōsakasayama
- Sanda
- Sasayama
- Sennan
- Settsu
- Shijōnawate
- Suita (pop 390,000)
- Takaishi
- Takarazuka
- Takasago
- Takatsuki (pop 350,000)
- Tatsuno
- Tondabayashi
- Toyonaka (pop 400,000)
- Uji
- Yao
- Yawata

=== Additional cities ===
In the major metropolitan area (MMA) definition used by the Japanese Statistics Bureau, the following cities in the prefectures of Mie, Shiga, Nara, Wakayama are included:

==== Mie Prefecture ====
- Nabari

==== Shiga Prefecture ====
- Higashiōmi
- Hikone
- Kōka
- Konan
- Kusatsu
- Moriyama
- Ōtsu (pop 350,000)
- Ōmihachiman
- Rittō
- Takashima
- Yasu

==== Nara Prefecture ====
- Gojō
- Gose
- Ikoma
- Kashiba
- Kashihara
- Katsuragi
- Nara (pop 350,000)
- Sakurai
- Tenri
- Uda
- Yamatokōriyama
- Yamatotakada

==== Wakayama Prefecture ====
- Wakayama (pop 360,000)
- Hashimoto
- Iwade
- Katsuragi

== Transportation ==
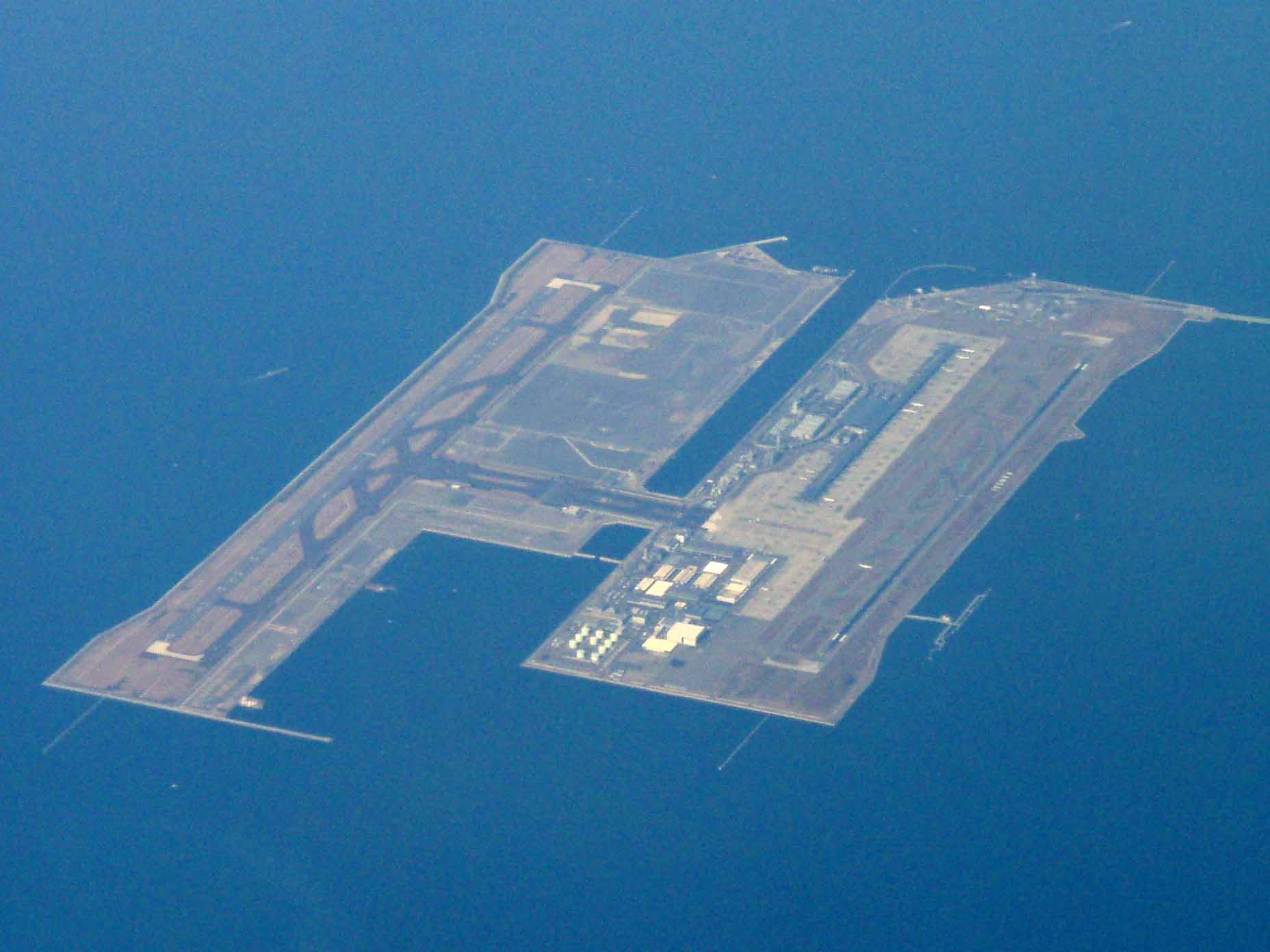
Kansai International Airport

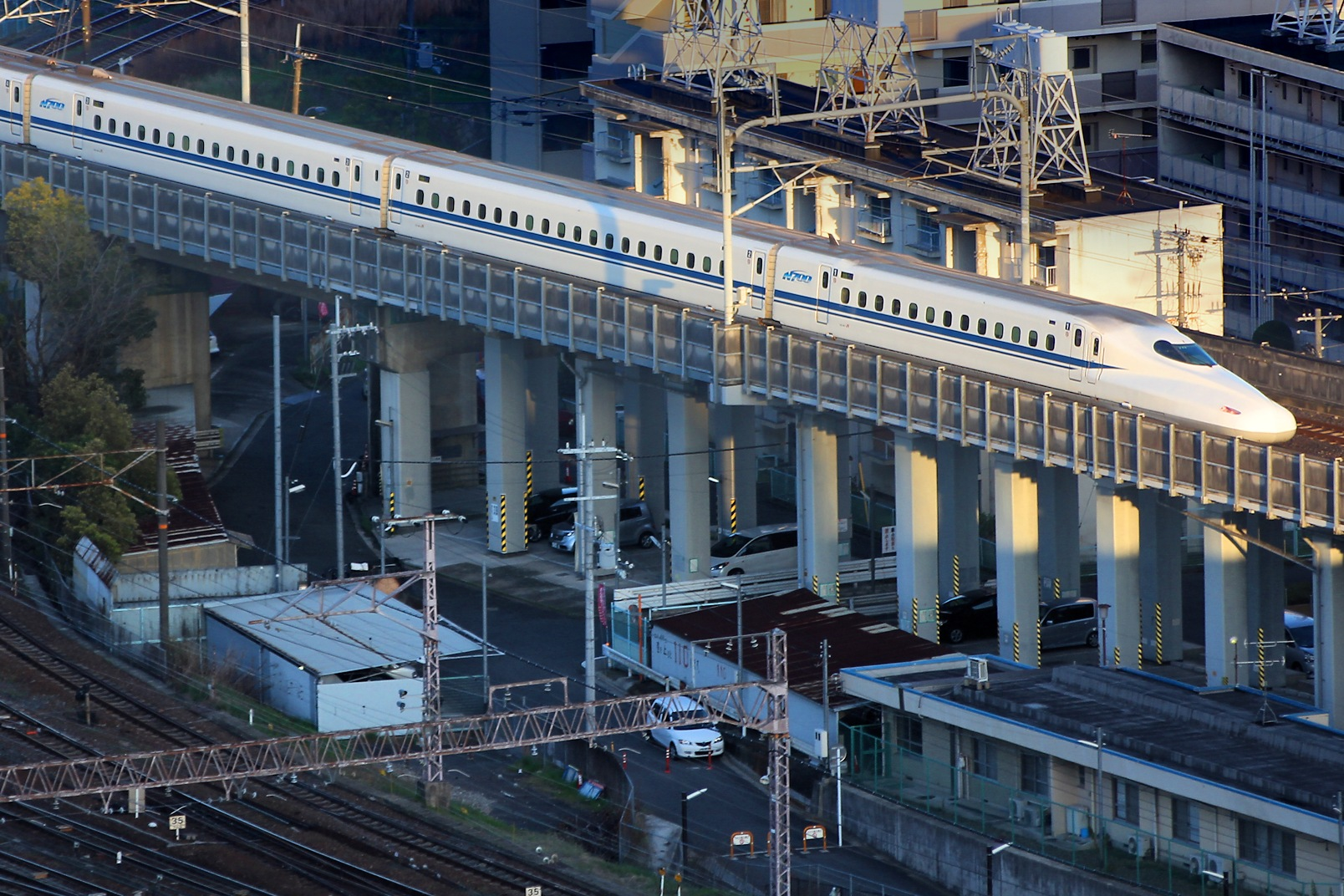
JR Central Tōkaidō Shinkansen arriving at Kyoto Station

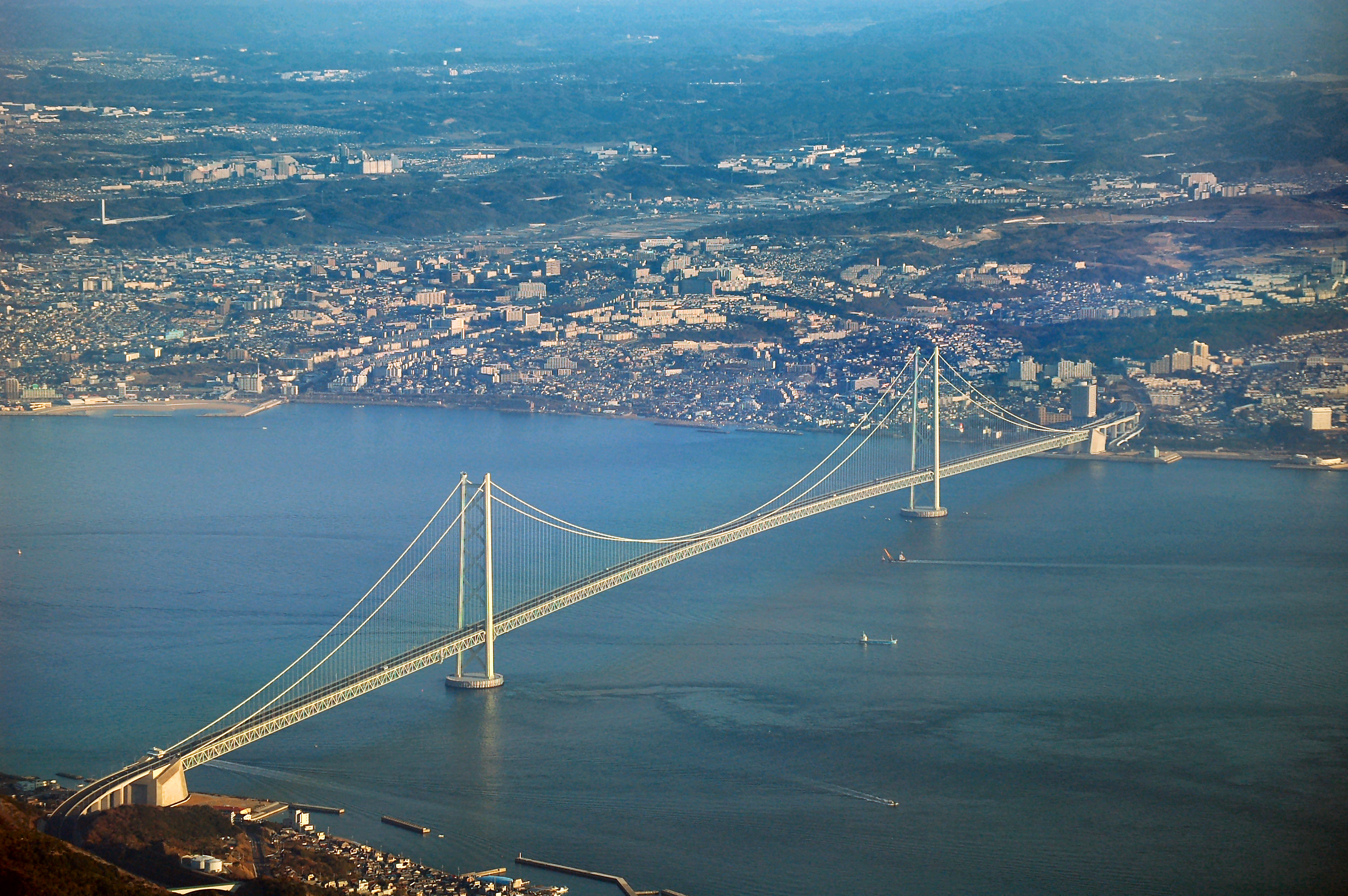
The Akashi Kaikyō Bridge extends from Kobe to Awaji Island.

=== Air ===
There are two major airports. The fairly centrally located Osaka International Airport, laid over the border between the cities of Itami and Toyonaka, serves primarily domestic routes.

Kansai International Airport opened in 1994 and is now the main international airport for the region. It sits on an artificial island well off-shore in Osaka Bay towards the Wakayama outlet. Kansai is the geographical term for the area of western Honshū surrounding Osaka. The airport island link to the mainland via the Sky Gate Bridge R, containing a six lane expressway and the Kansai Airport Line, a rail link connecting to the Hanwa Line, which connects Wakayama to Osaka. Limited express trains offer non-stop service to Osaka and onward to Kyoto. Local connections are made to other areas. Highway buses also offer service to many areas.

Kobe Airport, built on a reclaimed island south of Port Island opened in 2006, offering mainly domestic flights and some international flights.

=== Rail ===
Keihanshin has a very extensive network of railway lines, comparable to that of Greater Tokyo. Main rail terminals in the cities include, Umeda/Osaka, Namba, Tennoji, Sannomiya, and Kyoto.

==== High speed rail ====
JR Central and JR West operate high-speed trains on the Tōkaidō-Sanyō Shinkansen line. Shin-Ōsaka Station acts as the Shinkansen terminal station, though the two lines are physically joined, and many trains offer through service. This station is connected to Ōsaka Station at Umeda by the JR Kyoto Line and the subway Midōsuji Line. Shin-Osaka Station is the busiest high-speed station. The smaller stations of Kyoto Station, Shin-Kobe Station, Nishi-Akashi Station, Himeji Station, and Aioi Station also are within the Keihanshin area.

All trains on the two Shinkansen lines stop at Shin-Ōsaka Station and provide connections to other major cities in Japan. The Tokaido Shinkansen offers service to the east, stopping in such cities as Kyoto, Nagoya, Yokohama and Tokyo. From Tokyo connections can be made to other Shinkansen servicing areas north of Tokyo. The Sanyo Shinkansen offers service to the west, stopping in such cities as Kobe, Okayama, Hiroshima, and Fukuoka. Through service is also offered to the Kyushu Shinkansen extending service to such cities as Kumamoto and Kagoshima.

There are also numerous Limited Express services which operate on conventional lines, but are designed for comfortable long-distance travel. Many of these trains operate at speeds that most other countries would consider "high-speed". From Osaka and Kyoto, Limited Express services connect most major cities within the Keihanshin area and beyond, and are more popular than the Shinkansen for connections within the area due to service to more areas and more centrally located and well connected stations in areas also serviced by Shinkansen. Lower ticket prices also encourages usage, though they are more expensive than the regular/commuter trains which operate on the same lines.

==== Commuter rail ====
Both JR West and private lines connect Keihanshin and its suburbs. The commuter rail network of JR West is called the Urban Network. Major stations on the JR Osaka Loop Line include Osaka (Umeda), Tennōji, Tsuruhashi, and Kyōbashi. JR West competes with such private rail operators as Keihan Electric Railway, Hankyu Railway, Hanshin Railway, Kintetsu Railway, and Nankai Electric Railway. The Keihan and Hankyu lines connect Osaka and Kyoto; the Hanshin and Hankyu lines connect Osaka and Kobe; the Kintetsu lines connect to Nara, Yoshino, Ise and Nagoya; and the Nankai lines connect to Osaka's southern suburbs and Kansai International Airport as well as Wakayama and Mt. Koya. Many lines in Keihanshin accept either ICOCA or PiTaPa contactless smart cards for payment.

==== Municipal subway ====
Osaka, Kyoto and Kobe each have municipal subway systems. The Osaka Municipal Subway was privatized in 2018 and is now operated by Osaka Metro. Other rapid transit systems in the region include Kobe New Transit which serves the artificial islands off the coast of Kobe including Kobe Airport, as well as Osaka Monorail that connects municipalities in Osaka Prefecture to Osaka International Airport.

== Economy ==
=== GDP (purchasing power parity) 2015 ===
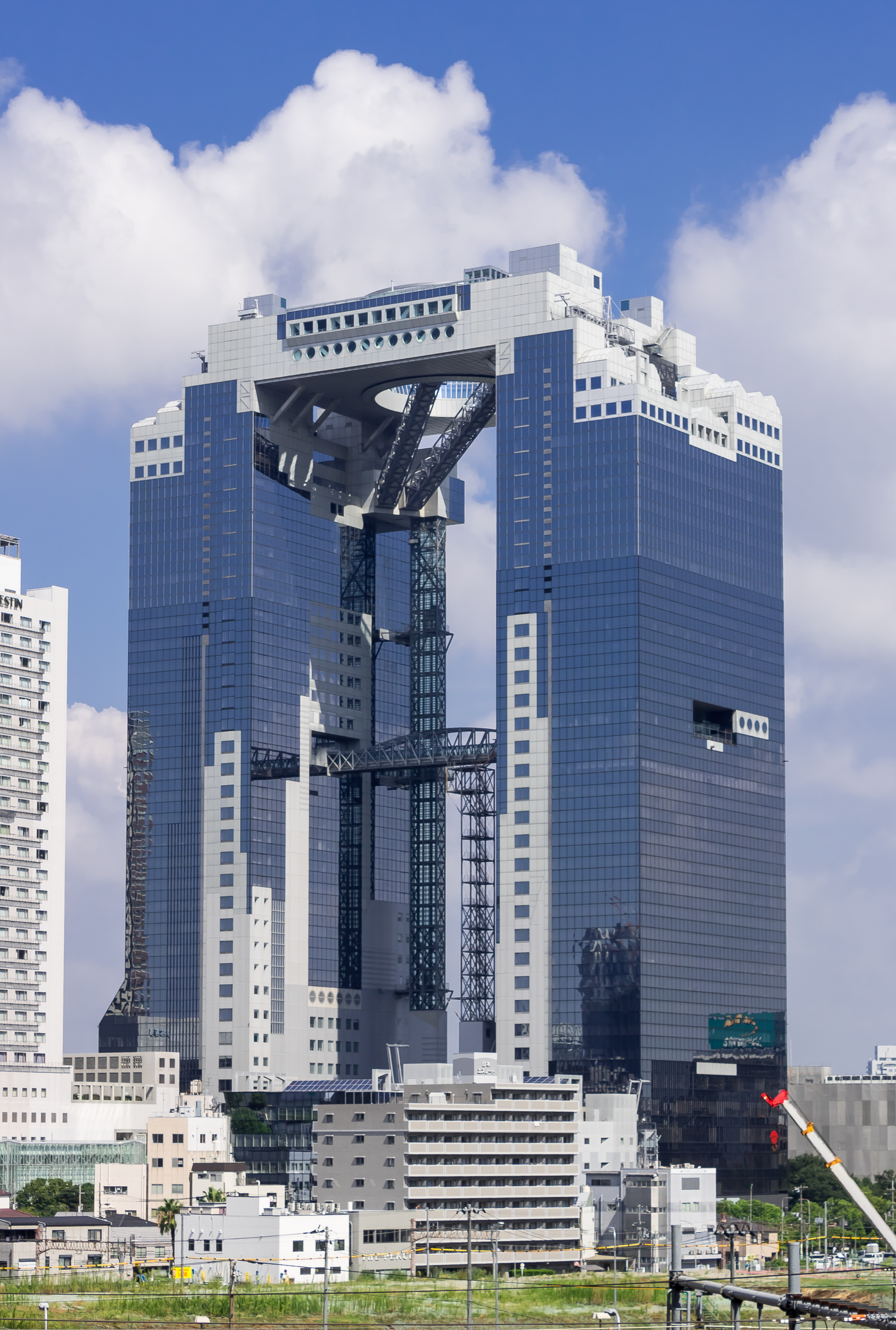
Umeda Sky Building

Compared with other urban regions of the world, the agglomeration of Osaka-Kobe is the ninth largest economy, in terms of gross metropolitan product at purchasing power parity (PPP), in 2015 according to a study by the Brookings Institution.

Rank	Metro area	Country	GDP(PPP) (in billion US$)
1	Tokyo	Japan	1,624
2	New York	United States	1,492
3	Los Angeles	United States	927.6
4	Seoul-Incheon	South Korea	903.5
5	London	United Kingdom	831.1
6	Paris	France	818.5
7	Shanghai	China	809.5
8	Moscow	Russia	749.7
9	Osaka-Kobe	Japan	681.0
10	Beijing	China	663.6

=== Metropolitan employment areas ===
GDP based on PPP (in billion US$)
Area	1980	1985	1990	1995	2010
Osaka MEA	119.5	162.5	235.7	272.2	406.3
Kyoto MEA	23.7	34.0	45.7	53.9	90.6
Kobe MEA	22.0	31.0	44.0	48.7	75.5
Himeji MEA	7.3	10.1	13.7	17.3	26.4
Wakayama MEA	5.7	7.6	8.6	9.7	19.3

=== Prefectures ===
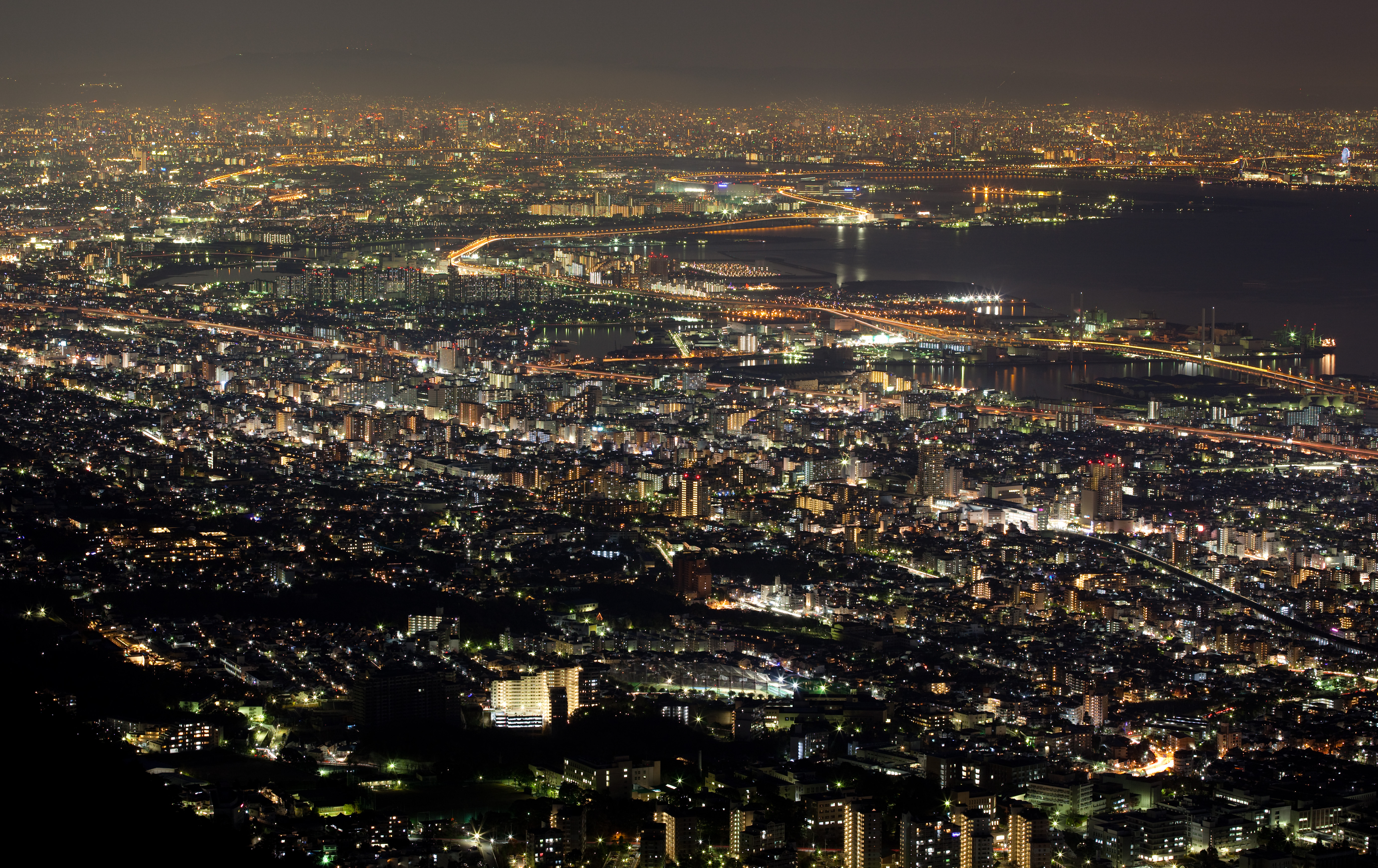
Osaka Bay at night

- 2014 average exchange rate (1 US dollar = 110 yen)

Prefecture	Gross Prefecture Product (in billion yen)	Gross Prefecture Product (in billion US$)
Osaka	37,934	358
Hyōgo	19,788	187
Kyoto	10,054	95
Shiga	5,846	55
Wakayama	3,579	34
Nara	3,541	33
Kansai Region	80,741	762

=== GDP (nominal) 2014 ===
Kansai region and Top 20 Countries.

Rank	Country	GDP (in US$)
1	United States	17.43 trillion
2	China	10.53 trillion
3	Japan	4.85 trillion
･･･
15	Mexico	1.30 trillion
16	Turkey	934.1 billion
17	Indonesia	891.1 billion
18	Netherlands	881.0 billion
	(Kansai Region)	762.1 billion
19	Saudi Arabia	756.4 billion
20	Switzerland	709.3 billion

== See also ==
- Hanshin Industrial Region (Osaka and Kobe area)
- Kamigata
- Kansai region
- Kansai Science City
- Keihanshin industrial region
- List of metropolitan areas by population
- List of metropolitan areas in Asia by population
- List of metropolitan areas in Japan by population
- Jing-Jin-Ji
