= Kawamura =

Kawamura (川村 or 河村) is a Japanese surname. Notable people with the surname include:

- A. G. Kawamura (born 1955), American politician and farmer
- Aki Kawamura (川村亜紀), gravure idol and television idol
- Hikaru Kawamura (川村ひかる), gravure idol
- Sumiyoshi Kawamura (川村純義), Admiral in the Imperial Japanese Navy
- Kageaki Kawamura (川村景明), Field Marshal in the Imperial Japanese Army
- Kaori Kawamura (川村カオリ), singer
- Kiyoo Kawamura (河村清雄), painter
- Katsutoshi Kawamura (川村 克俊; born 1954), Japanese ice hockey player
- Masahiro Kawamura (川村昌弘), Japanese golfer
- Maria Kawamura (川村万梨阿), voice actress
- Megumi Kawamura (河村めぐみ), model and volleyball player
- Mika Kawamura (川村美香), manga artist and author
- Miyuki Kawamura (河村 美幸; born 1994), Japanese women's basketball player
- Motomi Kawamura (河村 元美; born 1996), Japanese field hockey player
- Ryo Kawamura (河村亮), announcer
- Ryuichi Kawamura (河村隆一), singer-songwriter, musician, actor, and record producer.
- Seiko Kawamura (河村聖子), volleyball player
- Takashi Kawamura (河村たかし), politician
- Takuo Kawamura (川村拓央), voice actor
- Takeo Kawamura (川村丈夫), baseball player
- Takeo Kawamura (河村建夫), politician
- Takeshi Kawamura (川村毅), playwright and director
- Takumu Kawamura (川村 拓夢; born 1999), Japanese footballer
- Terry Teruo Kawamura, United States Army soldier
- Yasuo Kawamura (河村泰男), speed skater
- Yudai Kawamura (川村雄大), politician
- Yuka Kawamura (川村結花), singer-songwriter, composer
- Yuki Kawamura (河村勇輝), Japanese basketball player
- Yukie Kawamura (川村ゆきえ), gravure idol
- Zuiken Kawamura (河村瑞賢), merchant
- Kazuma Kawamura (川村 壱馬), singer, dancer, actor.

== Fictional characters ==
- Takashi Kawamura (The Prince of Tennis) (河村隆), a character in The Prince of Tennis
- Ami Kawamura (川村 アミ), a character in Little Battlers Experience

== See also ==
- Kawamura Station (Aichi), a guided bus stop in Moriyama-ku, Nagoya, Aichi Prefecture
- Kawamura Station (Kumamoto), a railway station in Sagara, Kumamoto, Kumamoto Prefecture, which was renamed in 2026 to Sagara-Toshima Station
- 10352 Kawamura, a main-belt asteroid
