= Ikezuki (horse) =

Japanese warhorse

Ikezuki (池月)is the name of a white horse that belonged to Shōgun Yoritomo and also makes an appearance in the Tale of Heike, being ridden by Sasaki Takatsuna, as well as other appearances throughout the Genpei War.

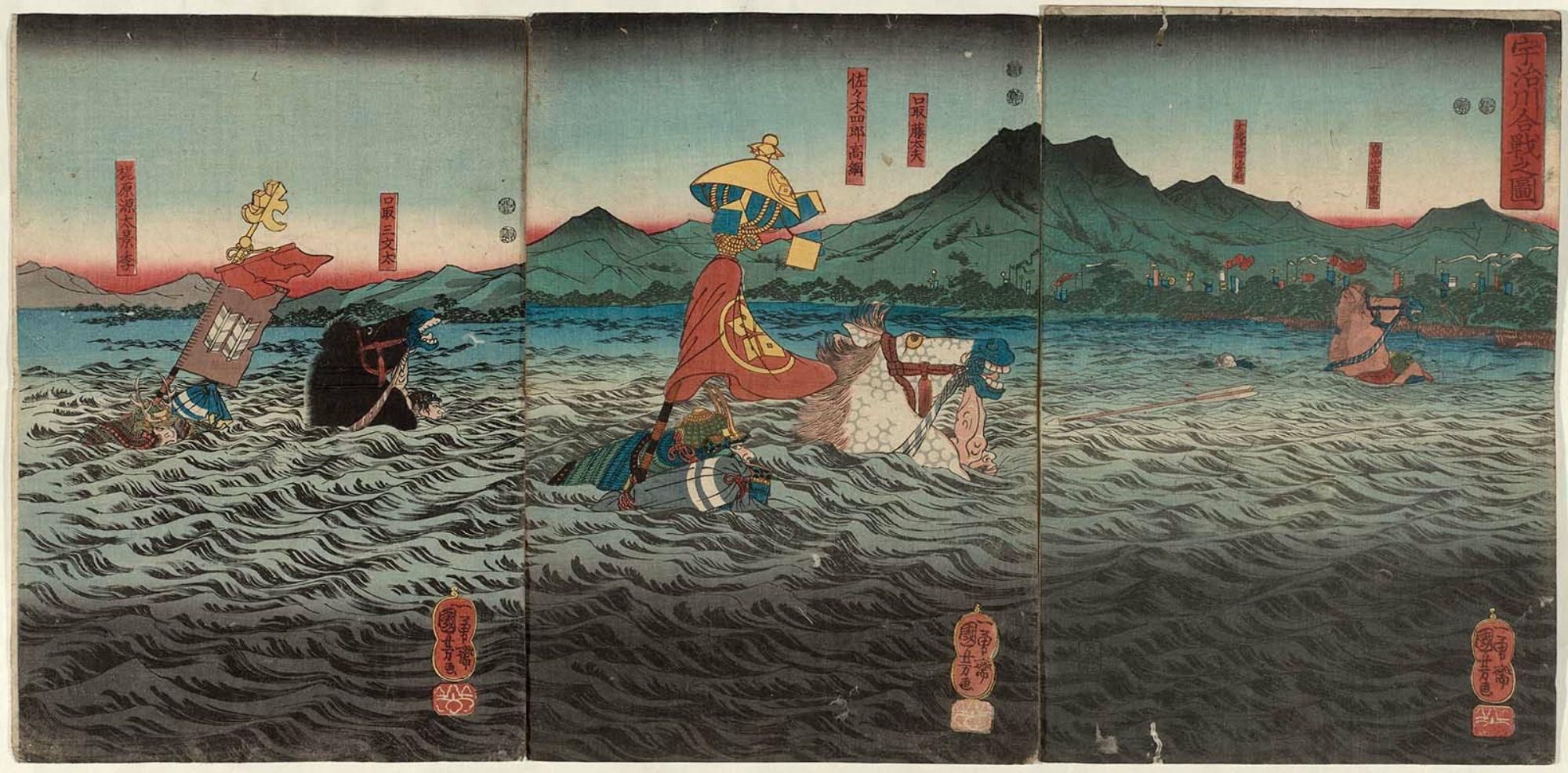
Sasaki Takatsuna racing atop Ikezuki to cross the Uji River before the second battle of Uji, as depicted in a print by Utagawa Kuniyoshi.

Ikezuki was well known for his ability to swim and bite. He was believed to be a messenger of Hachiman.

Today, the name Ikezuki is used as the name for a park in Mima City, the name of a station in Miyagi Prefecture (Ikezuki Station), and as the name of a sake maker.

== History ==
Ikezuki is believed to have been born in what is now Mima Town, Mima City, Tokushima Prefecture, Japan. His mother was a captive horse from Mima and his father was a wild horse from Mount Tsurugi, south of the Yoshino River. Ikezuki's father taught him to swim in the strong currents of the Yoshino River. He grew up to be very strong. One day, his mother fell into a marshy pond and died. He stood at the bank of the pond and caught a glimpse of her (failing to realize that it was actually his own reflection). He jumped after her many times. Villagers saw the image of him jumping over and over again into the pond (ike 池) with a beautiful moon (tsuki/zuki 月) behind him and therefore named him "Ikezuki".
