= Kitamaebune =

Shipping route in Japan from the Edo to Meiji Period

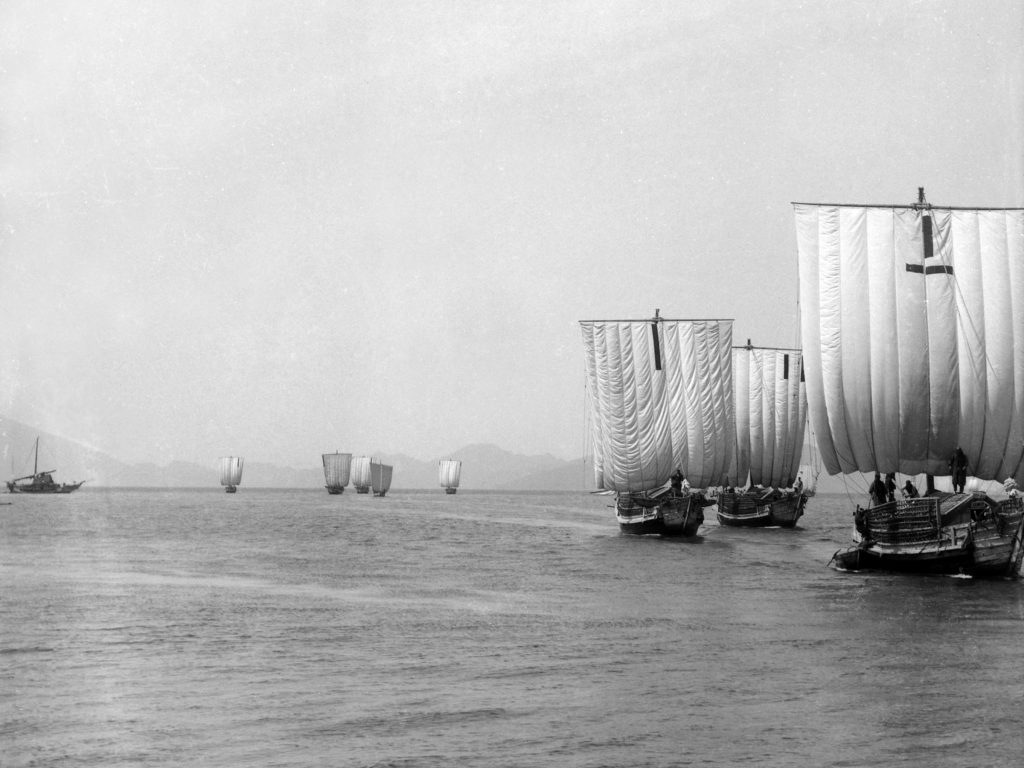
The Kitamaebune, photographed pre-1926 by Iida Yonezō

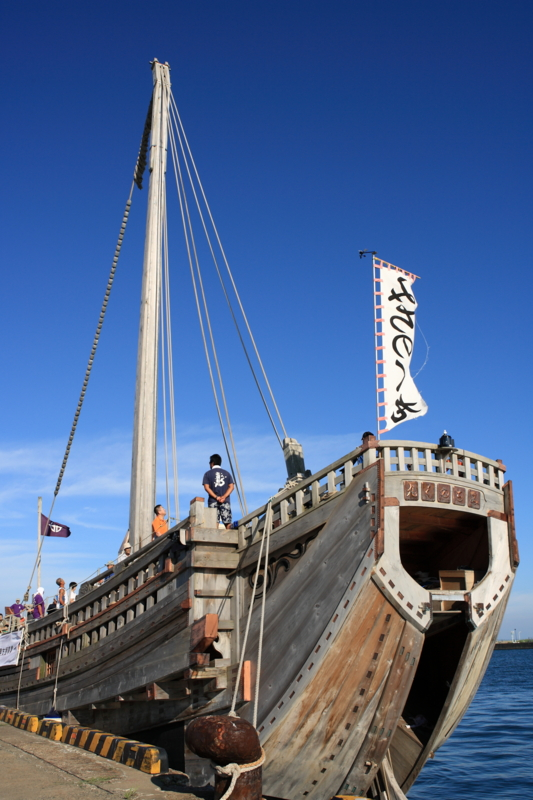
The Michinoku Maru, a modern reconstruction of a kitamaebune

The kitamaebune (北前船; "northern-bound ships") was a shipping route (and also the ships involved) in Japan from the Edo period to the Meiji era. The route went from Osaka through the Seto Inland Sea and the Kanmon Straits to ports in Hokuriku on the Sea of Japan and later to Hokkaidō.

Kaga Domain, which sold about 70,000 koku of rice every year in Osaka, succeeded in sending 100 koku by boat through this route in 1639. The Tokugawa shogunate also received rice from Dewa Province through merchant Kawamura Zuiken in 1672, but it is thought to be a response from these ships. Japanese ships at the time normally could make only one trip per year, but with the arrival of Western schooners in the Meiji era, ships were able to make up to four trips annually.

The Meiji Restoration also brought the end of the feudal system and the introduction of the telegraph, removing gaps between regional markets and making it difficult for the shipping routes to make large profits. The national construction of railroads further led to the end of the kitamaebune.

Currently, the Shin Nihonkai Ferry is sometimes called the modern kitamaebune, with stops along the old route at Maizuru, Niigata, Akita, Tomakomai, Hokkaidō, and Otaru.
