= Terry Teruo Kawamura =

US Army Medal of Honor recipient (1949–1969)

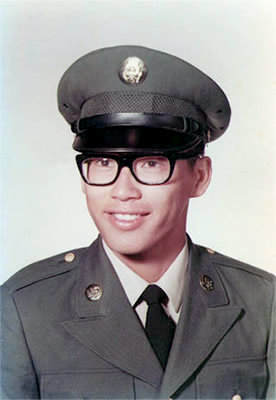
- Corporal Terry Kawamura
- Born: December 10, 1949; Wahiawā, Territory of Hawaii, U.S.
- Died: March 20, 1969 (aged 19) †; Camp Radcliff, Bình Định Province, Republic of Vietnam
- Burial place: Mililani Memorial Park, Mililani, Oahu, Hawaii
- Military career
- Allegiance: United States of America
- Branch: United States Army
- Service years: 1968–1969
- Rank: Corporal
- Units: 173rd Engineer Company, 173rd Airborne Brigade
- Conflicts: Vietnam War †
- Awards: Medal of Honor; Bronze Star; Purple Heart

Terry Teruo Kawamura (Japanese: 河村 昭男, December 10, 1949 – March 20, 1969) was a United States Army soldier and a recipient of the Medal of Honor for his actions in the Vietnam War.

== Vietnam War military service and death ==
Terry Kawamura joined the Army in Oahu, Hawaii in 1968, and by March 20, 1969, was serving as a corporal in the 173rd Engineer Company, 173rd Airborne Brigade. On that day, at Camp Radcliff, Republic of Vietnam, Kawamura smothered an enemy-thrown explosive with his body, sacrificing his life to protect those around him. Terry Kawamura, aged 19 at his death, was buried in Mililani Memorial Park, Mililani, Hawaii.

== Medal of Honor citation ==
Corporal Kawamura's official Medal of Honor citation reads:

For conspicuous gallantry and intrepidity in action at the risk of his life above and beyond the call of duty. Cpl. Kawamura distinguished himself by heroic action while serving as a member of the 173d Engineer Company. An enemy demolition team infiltrated the unit quarters area and opened fire with automatic weapons. Disregarding the intense fire, Cpl. Kawamura ran for his weapon. At that moment, a violent explosion tore a hole in the roof and stunned the occupants of the room. Cpl. Kawamura jumped to his feet, secured his weapon and, as he ran toward the door to return the enemy fire, he observed that another explosive charge had been thrown through the hole in the roof to the floor. He immediately realized that 2 stunned fellow soldiers were in great peril and shouted a warning. Although in a position to escape, Cpl. Kawamura unhesitatingly wheeled around and threw himself on the charge. In completely disregarding his safety, Cpl. Kawamura prevented serious injury or death to several members of his unit. The extraordinary courage and selflessness displayed by Cpl. Kawamura are in the highest traditions of the military service and reflect great credit upon himself, his unit, and the U.S. Army.

== Awards and decorations ==
Throughout his military career, Kawamura has been awarded the following:

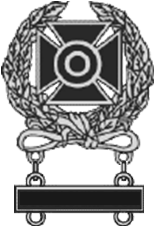

Badge	Parachutist Badge		
1st row	Medal of Honor	Bronze Star with "V" device	Purple Heart
2nd row	National Defense Service Medal	Vietnam Service Medal with 3 Campaign stars	Vietnam Campaign Medal with "60-" clasp
Badge	Expert marksmanship badge with rifle component bar		
Unit awards	U.S Army Presidential Unit Citation		U.S. Army Gallantry Cross Unit Citation

== Legacy ==
The gate connecting Wheeler Army Airfield with Mililani is named in honor of Corporal Kawamura.

Building 1451 (US Army Advocacy Center) Fort Belvoir is named in honor of Corporal Kawamura.

== See also ==
- List of Medal of Honor recipients
- List of Medal of Honor recipients for the Vietnam War
- Kawamura
