= Hatakeyama Shigetada =

Japanese samurai

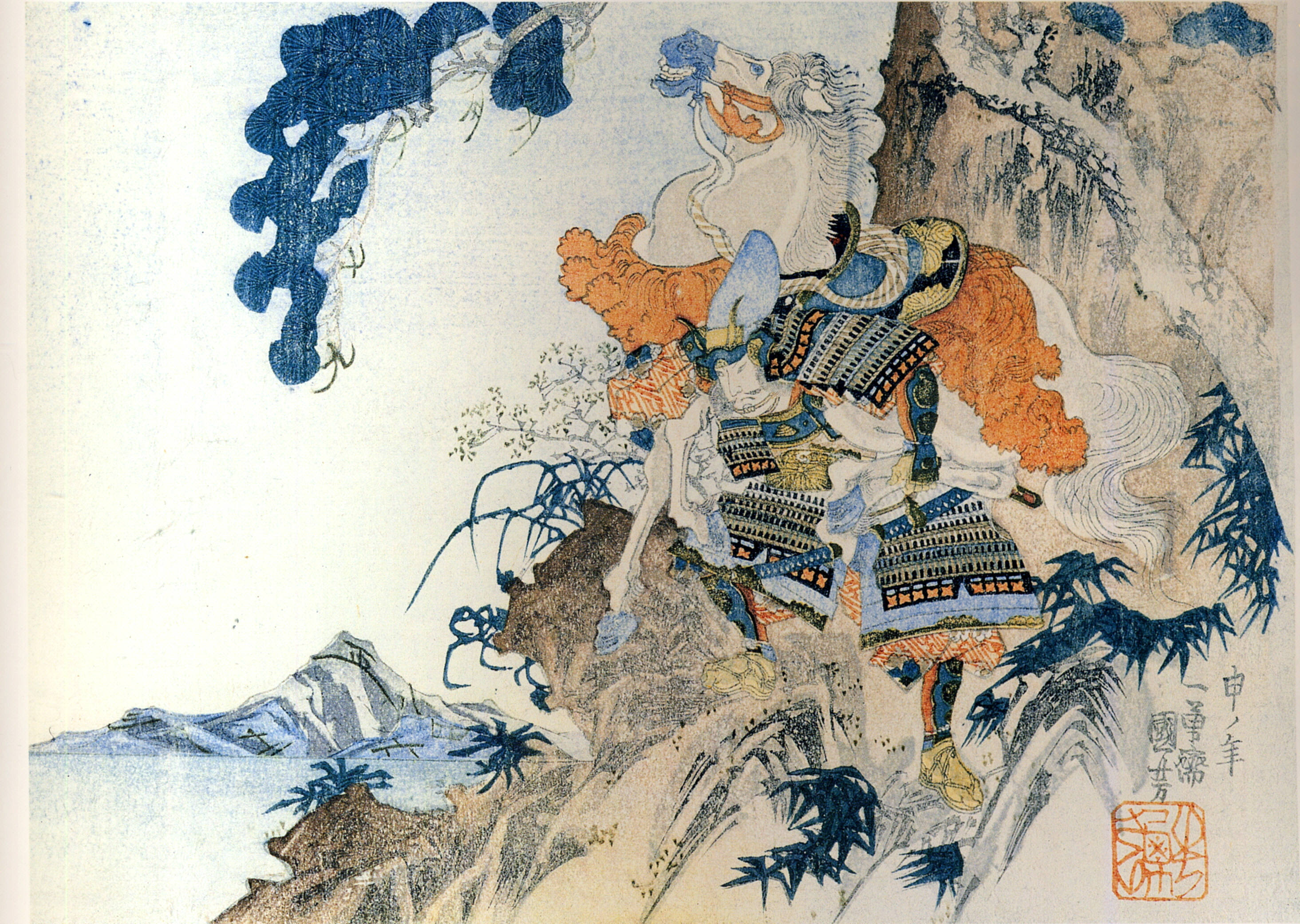
Hatakeyama Shigetada. Ukiyo-e woodblock print by Utagawa Kuniyoshi

Hatakeyama Shigetada (畠山 重忠; 1164– 20 July 1205) was a samurai warlord of the late Heian and early Kamakura period Japan. He fought in the Genpei War, though originally for the Taira clan, he switched sides to the Minamoto clan for the Battle of Dan-no-ura, and ended the war on the winning side.

His Dharma name was Jissan Shūshin Daikoji (實山宗眞大居士).

== Biography ==
Following the war, when his son Shigeyasu was killed by Hōjō Tokimasa, Shigetada spoke up. The reward for this temerity was death, along with the rest of his family. His brave attempt to defend his honor, along with various other acts of strength and skill are recorded in the Heike Monogatari and other chronicles of the period.

In an anecdote from the Heike monogatari, he is described as competing, along with a number of other warriors, to be the first across the Uji River. When his horse is shot in the head with an arrow, he abandons the creature and uses his bow as a staff to help himself across. Just as he is about to climb the bank, however, his godson Okushi no Shigechika asks for help, and is grabbed and thrown ashore by Shigetada; Shigechika then stands tall and proclaims himself the winner, the first across the river.

After the Battle of Awazu in 1184, Shigetada was known for failing to capture Tomoe Gozen.

== Gallery ==
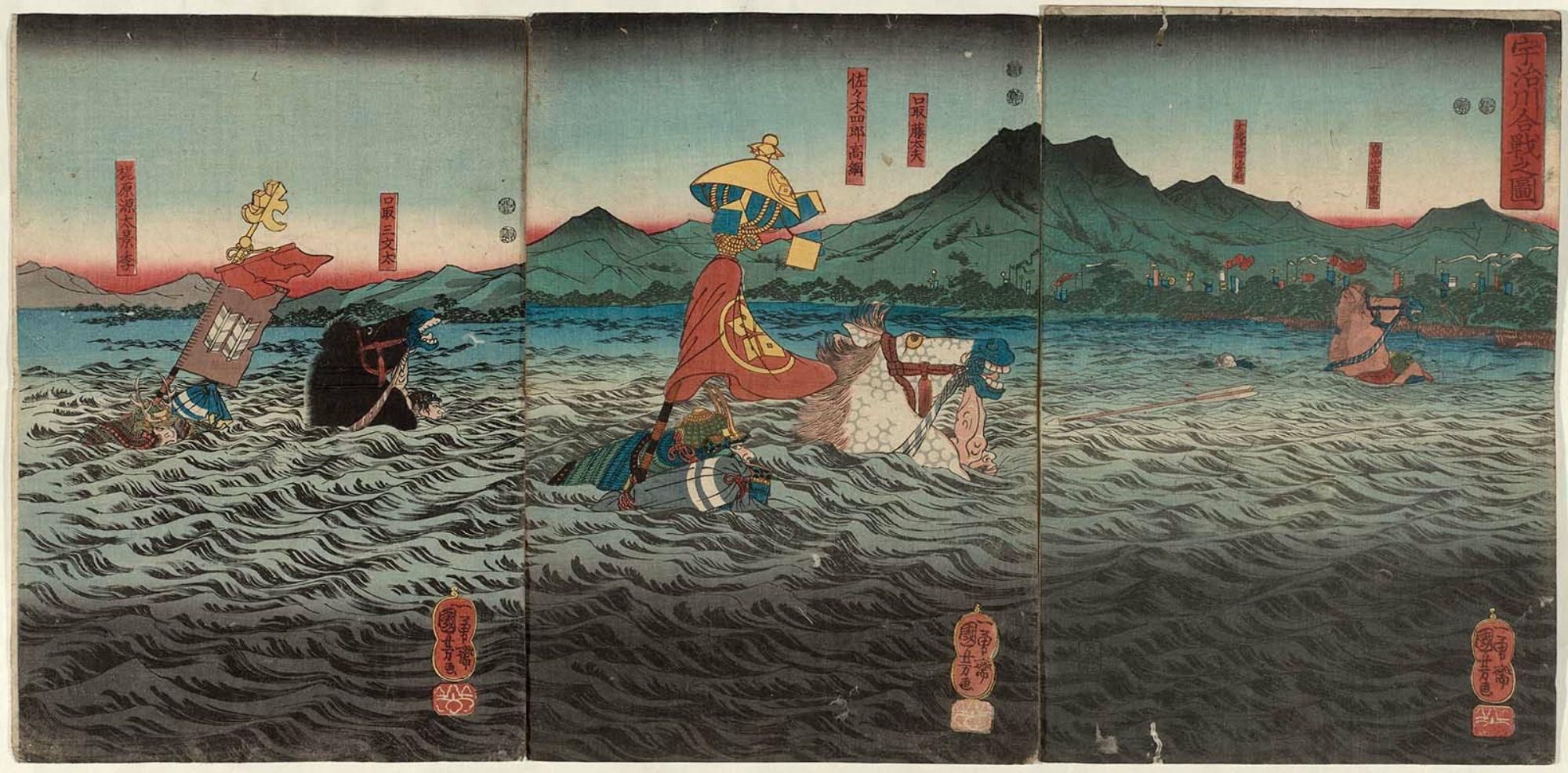
Kajiwara Kagesue, Sasaki Takatsuna, and Hatakeyama Shigetada racing to cross the Uji River before the second battle of Uji. Woodblock print by Kuniyoshi

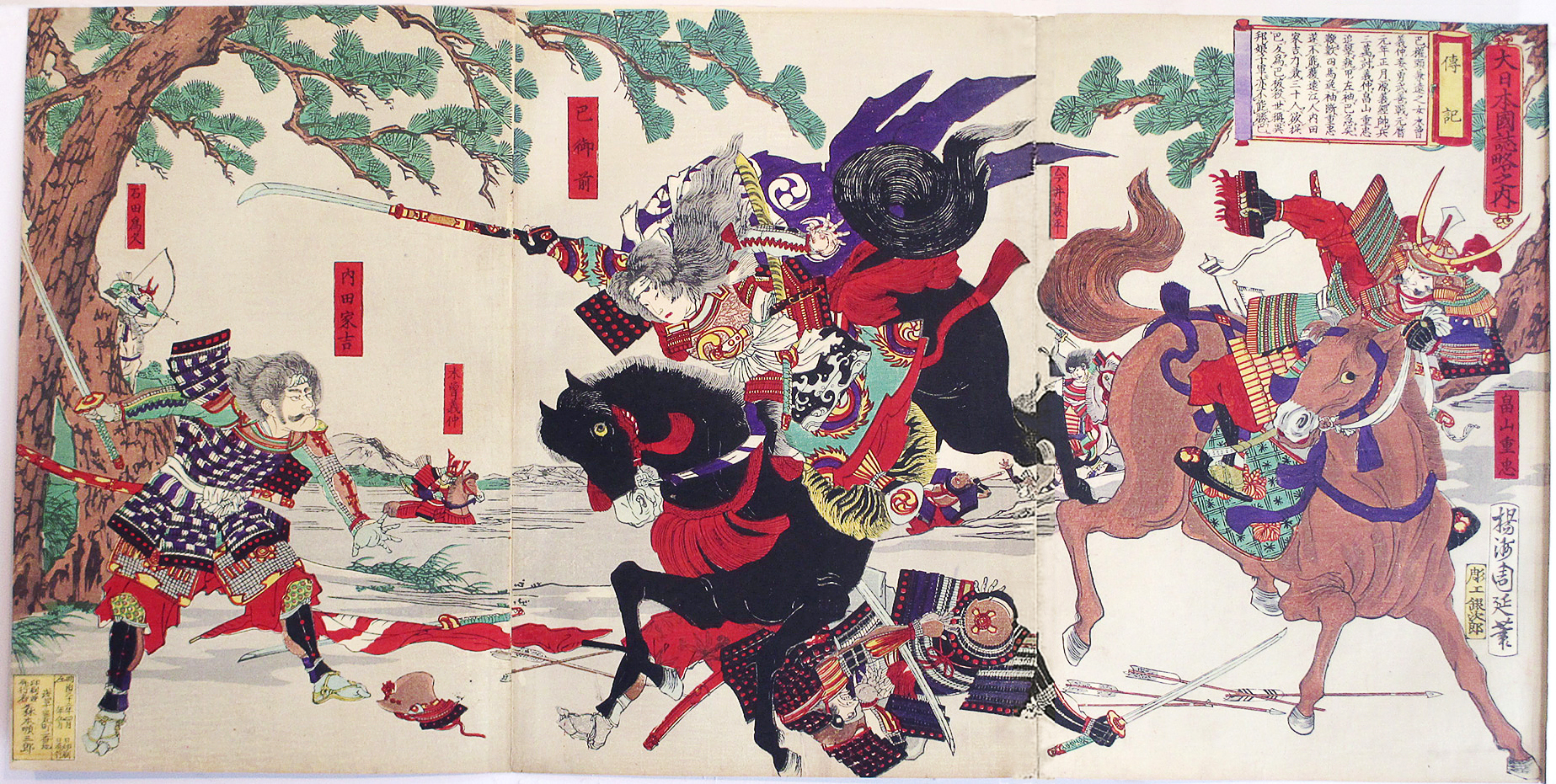
Tomoe Gozen with Uchida Ieyoshi and Hatakeyama no Shigetada. Woodblock print by Yōshū Chikanobu, 1899
