= Sasaki Takatsuna =

Japanese samurai commander

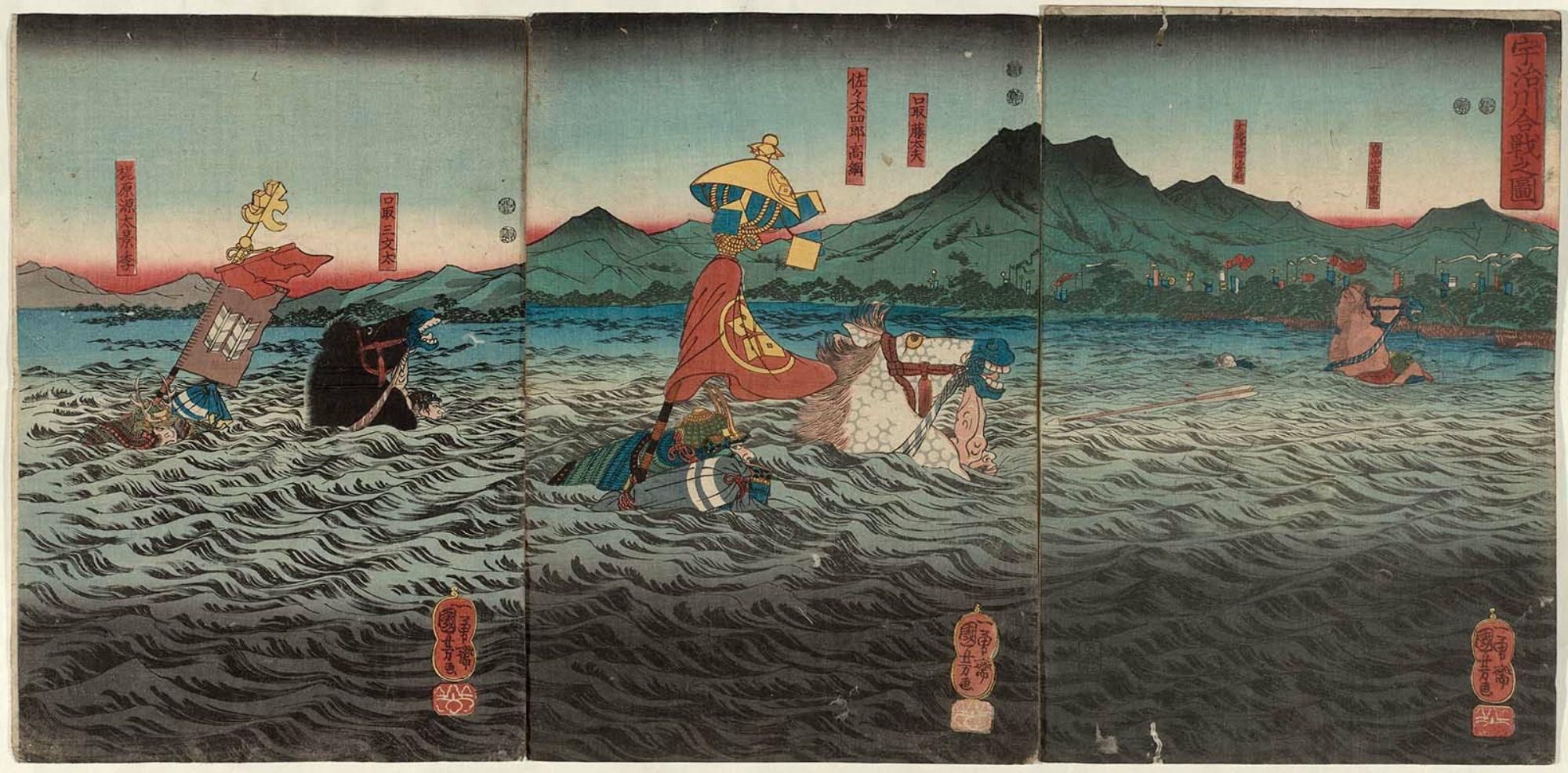
Kajiwara Kagesue, Sasaki Takatsuna, and Hatakeyama Shigetada racing to cross the Uji River before the second battle of Uji, as depicted in a print by Utagawa Kuniyoshi.

Sasaki Takatsuna (佐々木 高綱; 1160 – December 8, 1214) was a Japanese samurai commander in the Genpei War, the great conflict between the Minamoto and Taira clans.

An infant at the time of the Heiji Rebellion (1159–1160), Takatsuna was spared the destruction of his family several years later. He grew up with an aunt in Kyoto, and joined the forces of Minamoto no Yoritomo in 1180, when Yoritomo called for aid against the Taira.

Takatsuna saved Yoritomo's life at the battle of Ishibashiyama, and aided in the destruction of the Taira following the end of the war. As a result, he was rewarded with the position of shugo or governor of Nagato province.

In 1195, Takatsuna retired to Mount Koya to become a Shingon priest. He left his son with his title, land, and all his material possessions. He is said to have died in 1214 in Matsumoto, Nagano (then Shinano Province). Nogi Maresuke was one of his descendants.

When depicted in tales or in art, Takatsuna is often shown racing Kajiwara Kagesue across the River Uji atop Shōgun Yoritomo's white horse, Ikezuki, to be the first to engage in battle at the 1184 battle of Uji.

== See also ==
- Sasaki clan
- The Tale of the Heike
- Sasaki Yoshikiyo
