= Kajiwara Kagesue =

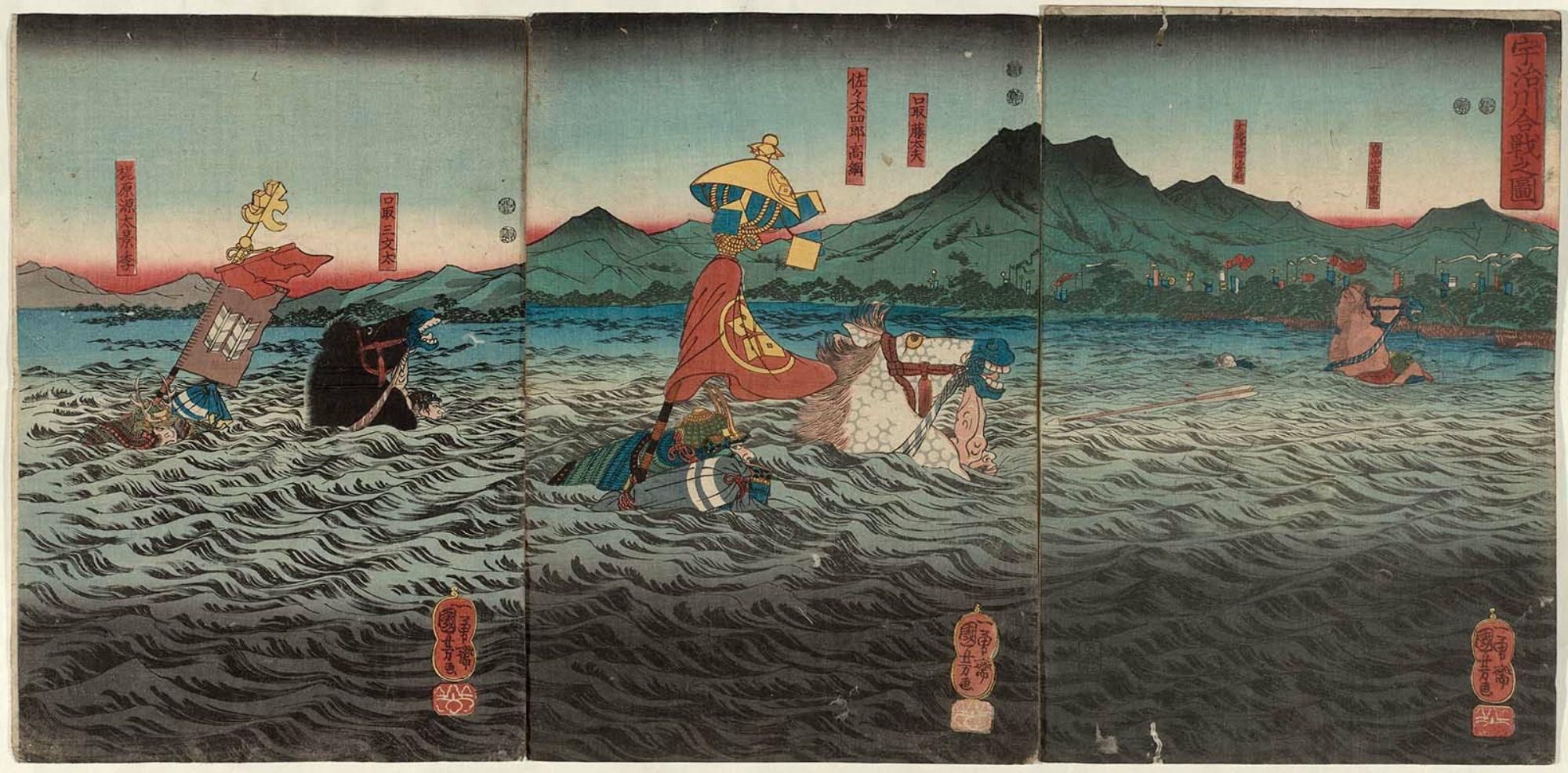
Kajiwara Kagesue, Sasaki Takatsuna, and Hatakeyama Shigetada racing to cross the Uji River before the second battle of Uji, as depicted in a print by Utagawa Kuniyoshi.

Kajiwara Kagesue (Japanese: 梶原 景季; 1162 – February 6, 1200), was a samurai in service to the Minamoto clan during the Genpei War of Japan's late Heian period.

The Heike monogatari records an anecdote about a friendly competition with Sasaki Takatsuna prior to the second battle of Uji. Mounted on Yoritomo's black horse, Surusumi, he races Takatsuna across the River Uji.

Kajiwara was killed along with his father Kagetoki at Suruga by men loyal to Minamoto no Yoriie.
