= Takeshi Kawamura =

Japanese playwright and director (born 1959)

Takeshi Kawamura (川村 毅, Kawamura Takeshi, born 1959) is a Japanese playwright and director.

He gained recognition in the 1980s for his popular-culture-influenced, violent, highly physical plays. Building upon this early work with later projects of social criticism and postmodern theatrical experimentation, Kawamura secured his position as an internationally recognized theatre artist. As artistic director of theatre companies Daisan Erotica and T Factory, Kawamura uses his plays to comment directly and indirectly on Japanese social conditions and current events while prompting audiences to consider issues such as the shaping influences of media, the confusion of reality with fantasy, and the nature of human individuality.

== 1980s: Early work ==
Born in Tokyo in 1959, Kawamura established his first company, Daisan Erotica, in 1980, while studying at Meiji University. Kawamura wrote, directed, and sometimes acted in the young company's productions, which took inspiration from the Japanese angura (underground) theatre of the 1960s and 1970s and from Western and Japanese popular culture. Drawing upon and reacting to the work of such angura playwright/director/actors as Terayama Shūji, Suzuki Tadashi, and Kara Jūrō, Kawamura embraced their experimental focus and avant-garde physicality while rejecting their desire to reconcile the present with the past and their faith in social activism. In drawing from angura, Kawamura also absorbed at second-hand the ideas of Western theatre artists, such as Antonin Artaud’s violent, irrational Theatre of Cruelty; Samuel Beckett’s wistful absurdism; and Bertolt Brecht’s desire to keep an audience aware and critical of theatrical and social artifice. Other, direct Western influences included the films of directors like Ridley Scott (Blade Runner) and Sam Peckinpah (The Wild Bunch, Straw Dogs).

Combining all of these influences, Kawamura’s early plays, created with Daisan Erotica, included Radical Party (1983), about a group of young, nihilistic male prostitutes, rebelling “in opposition to nothing whatsoever”; Genocide (1984), in which a young man steps into and becomes trapped in “the film he wishes he could see”; and Eight Dogs of Shinjuku: Volume 1, Birth of Dogs (1985), a deconstruction of a classic Japanese novel series, re-set in Shinjuku’s underground gay culture. Eight Dogs of Shinjuku won Japan’s premiere award for new plays, the Kishida Kunio Drama Award.; but an earlier play, Japan Wars, remains Kawamura’s most-referenced work in the Western world.

=== Japan Wars ===
Written in 1984, Japan Wars follows a group of young people who wake up trapped aboard a submarine, recalling only that they were once “radical activists.” They gradually discover that they are actually androids, programmed as soldiers; all of their “human” memories are false, carefully chosen and implanted to control their thoughts and actions in a war against mutant cows who have overrun the planet. At the play's climax, the androids rebel, only to learn that their desire for “revolution” also comes from programming secretly implanted by the cows to keep them from being milked; their shadowy creators have engineered even their disobedience, in order to prepare them for war. Some critics view the piece as a “superlative” example of Japanese theatre in the 1980s – theatre written by young artists disillusioned with the rampant commercialism of Japan's “bubble economy,” skeptical of all motives and desires, imagining the future as bleak, meaningless, and inescapable. The myth of the individual identity, the overlap of reality and “created” reality (fiction perceived as reality), violence as a reaction “programmed” by a subtle power structure, and youth as the focus of corrupting forces all recur often in Kawamura's later projects.

== 1990s: International recognition ==
In the 1990s, Kawamura's work began to gain recognition overseas. His 1990 production A Man Called Macbeth toured North America in 1992, playing at the International Theatre Festival of Chicago; set in the Japanese criminal underworld, this version of Macbeth incorporated framing scenes in which the young Macbeth commented on the action to a police interrogator. Kawamura returned to the U.S. in 1997, after receiving a grant to study New York City theatre, and again in 1998, to direct two productions as a guest director for New York University’s Department of Drama, Tisch School of the Arts. In this same decade, Kawamura’s productions with Daisan Erotica moved away from indirect social criticism, cloaked in science fiction, towards direct, pointed commentary on Japanese current events and social conditions. Tokyo Trauma (1995) came out of a need to comment on the twin catastrophes of the 1995 Kobe earthquake and the sarin gassing of Tokyo subway trains by Aum cultists. Obsession Site (1996) dealt with Japan’s colonial invasions of Korea and China and with issues such as racism, homelessness, street violence, and social apathy. Kawamura also began to employ video projections in his pieces, as well as modern dancers and dance techniques.

== 2000s: Further experimentation ==
The 2000s have seen further changes in Kawamura’s work, though his interest in social concerns, in violence as socially programmed, and in the confusion of reality and fantasy remain constant. Returning to the deconstruction of preexisting texts that he first explored in Eight Dogs of Shinjuku and A Man Called Macbeth, Kawamura presented Hamletclone in 2000. The piece examined Japanese current events and social frictions using live actors, image projections, video footage, modern dance, and extensive sound design, while also paying tribute to German postmodern playwright Heiner Müller’s Hamletmachine – itself a pastiche and deconstruction of Shakespeare and many other sources. Kawamura’s interest in dissecting and reinventing texts went one step further in 2001, when he revisited his own 1980s “classic,” Japan Wars. The new version, Japan Wars (2), vivisected the original text using the same framing device with which Kawamura had manipulated Shakespeare in A Man Called Macbeth: An interrogator asks one character, here one of the androids, to recall the action of the original play. Incorporating images of the World Trade Center attacks and ending the piece with the phrase “The film is finished,” the production again questioned the boundaries between reality and constructed media.

== Post-Daisan-Erotica ==
Kawamura reconstructed his company itself the following year, renaming it T Factory; Daisan Erotica became the name of an affiliated venue for actor training and play development. T Factory staged a revival of Hamletclone, similar to that of Japan Wars, in 2003. Kawamura's most recent piece to tour North America (in 2007 and continuing into 2008), AOI/KOMACHI, adapts much older source material. The production places two 15th-century traditional Japanese noh plays in modern settings, drawing on horror film influences and critiquing the cult of celebrity.

== Selected works ==
- Seikimatsu Love (1980)
- Radical Party (1983).
- Japan Wars (1984).
- Genocide (1984).
- Eight Dogs of Shinjuku: Volume 1, Birth of Dogs (1985) (Kishida Kunio Drama Award-winner).
- Last Frankenstein (1986).
- Freaks (1987).
- Imperial AIDS Strikes Back (1988).
- A Man Called Macbeth (1990).
- Last Frankenstein (film version, Kawamura as director) (1992).
- Grand Guignol (1994).
- The Dissection Room (1995).
- Tokyo Trauma (1995).
- Obsession Site (1996).
- Oedipus, Why? (1997).
- The Lost Babylon (1999).
- Hamletclone (2000).
- Japan Wars (2) (2001).
- The Straw Heart (2001).
- AOI/KOMACHI(2007).
