= Battle of Uji (1184) =

Battle in 1184 in Japan

Second Battle of Uji
- Part of Genpei War
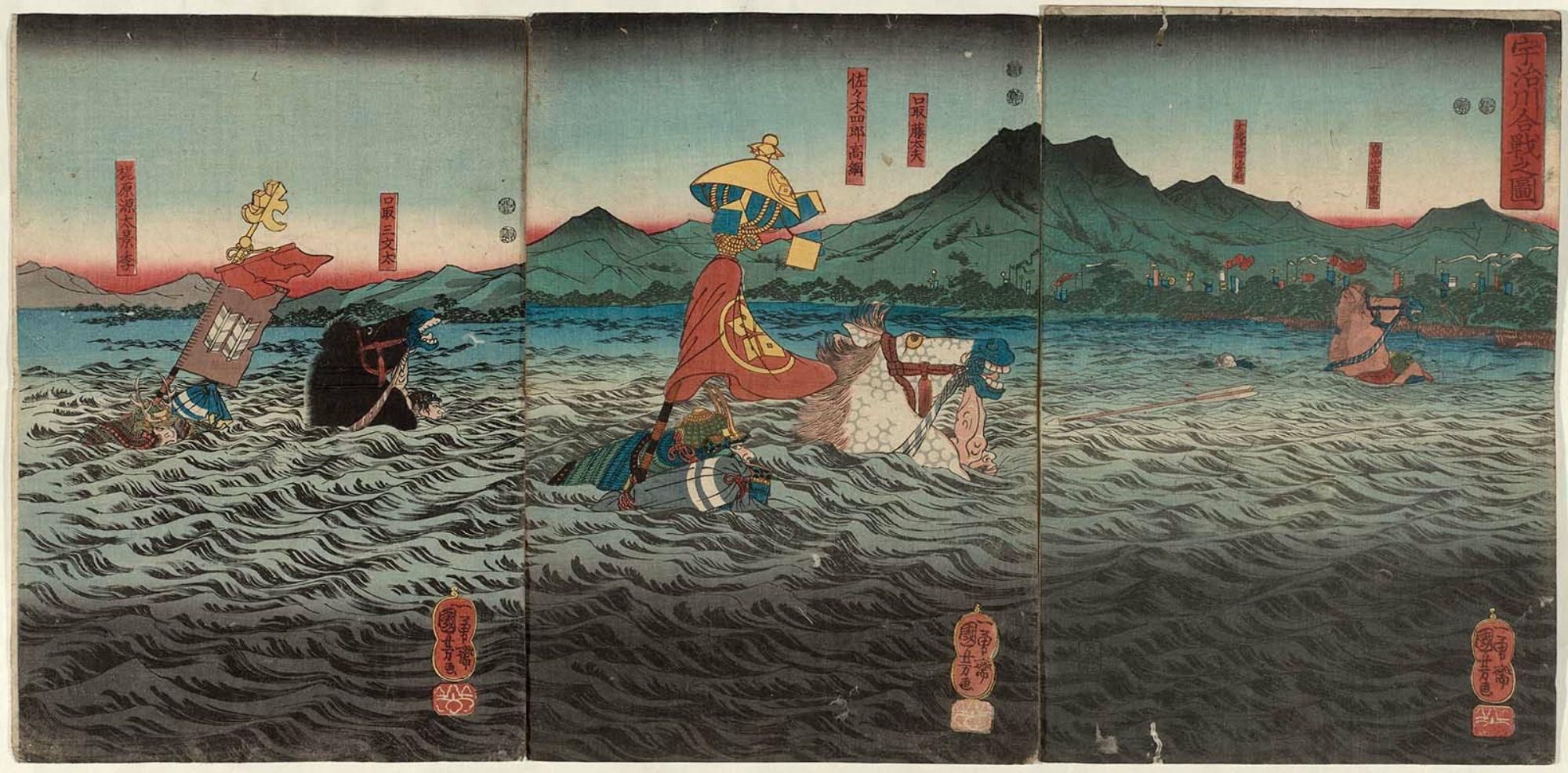
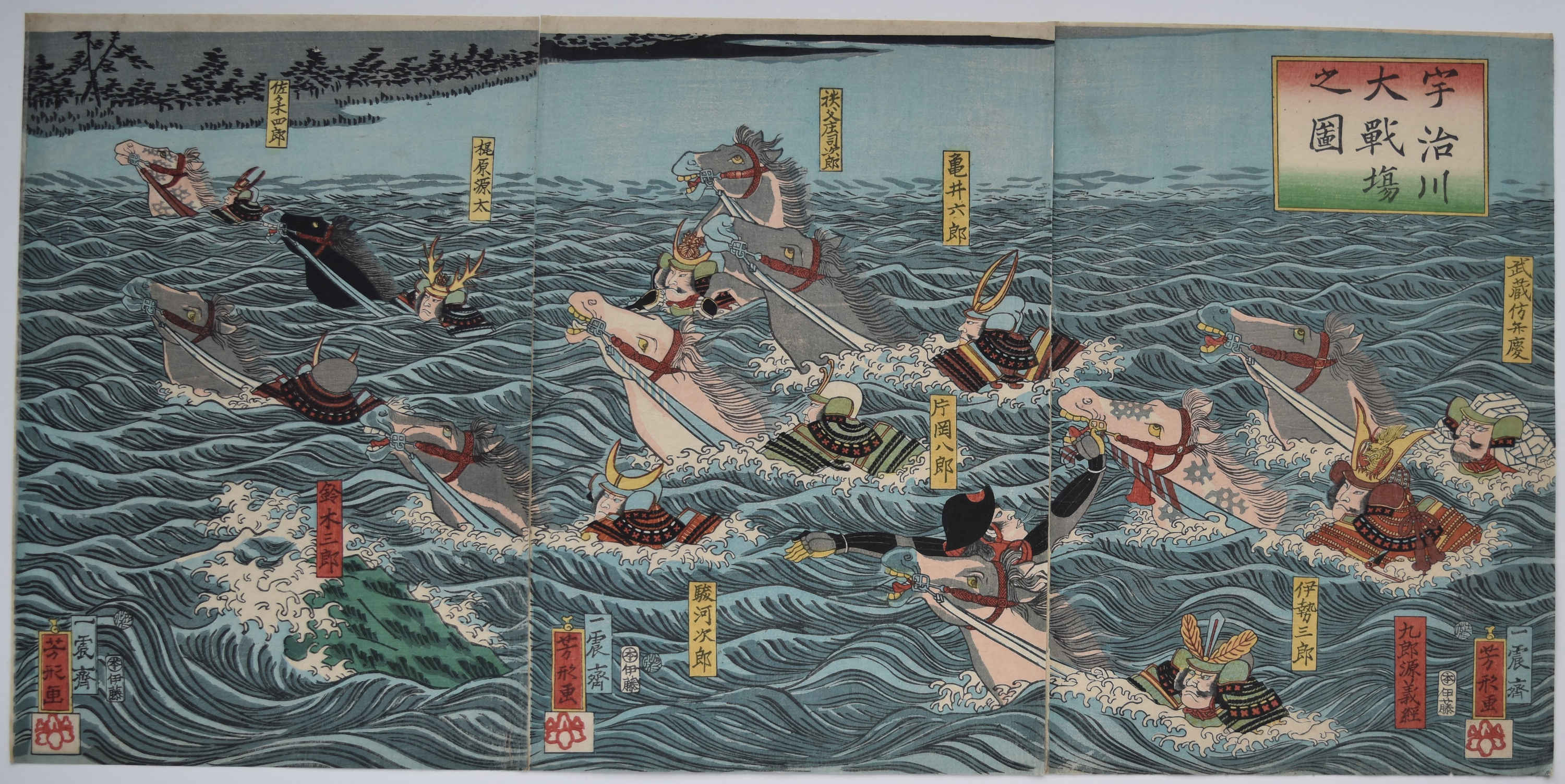
- Top: Kajiwara Kagesue, Sasaki Takatsuna, and Hatakeyama Shigetada racing to cross the Uji River before the second battle of Uji, New Year's Day, A.D. 1184, as depicted in a print by Utagawa Kuniyoshi. Bottom: A triptych showing the second battle of Uji River on February 19th, 1184, by Isshinsai Yoshikata. Published by Iseya Tokichi, 1863
Date	February 19, 1184
Location	Uji, just outside Kyoto 34°53′25″N 135°48′31″E
Result	Minamoto no Yoshitsune et al. victory

Belligerents
(Minamoto clan) Yoritomo faction	(Minamoto clan) Yoshinaka faction

Commanders and leaders
Minamoto no Yoshitsune	Minamoto no Yoshinaka
- Location within Japan

In the Battle of Uji that occurred in 1184, Minamoto no Yoshinaka tried to wrest power from his cousins Yoritomo and Yoshitsune, seeking to take command of the Minamoto clan. To that end, he burned the Hōjūji Palace, and kidnapped Emperor Go-Shirakawa. However, his cousins Noriyori and Yoshitsune caught up with him soon afterwards, following him across the Bridge over the Uji, New Year's Day, 1184, which Yoshinaka had torn up to impair their crossing.

This was an ironic reversal of the first Battle of the Uji, only four years earlier. Much as the Taira did in that first battle, Minamoto no Yoshitsune led his horsemen across the river, and defeated Yoshinaka.

== See also ==
- Kajiwara Kagesue
- Sasaki Takatsuna
- The Tale of the Heike
