= Yodo River =

Major river in Osaka Prefecture, Japan

Coordinates: 34°40′59″N 135°25′11″E

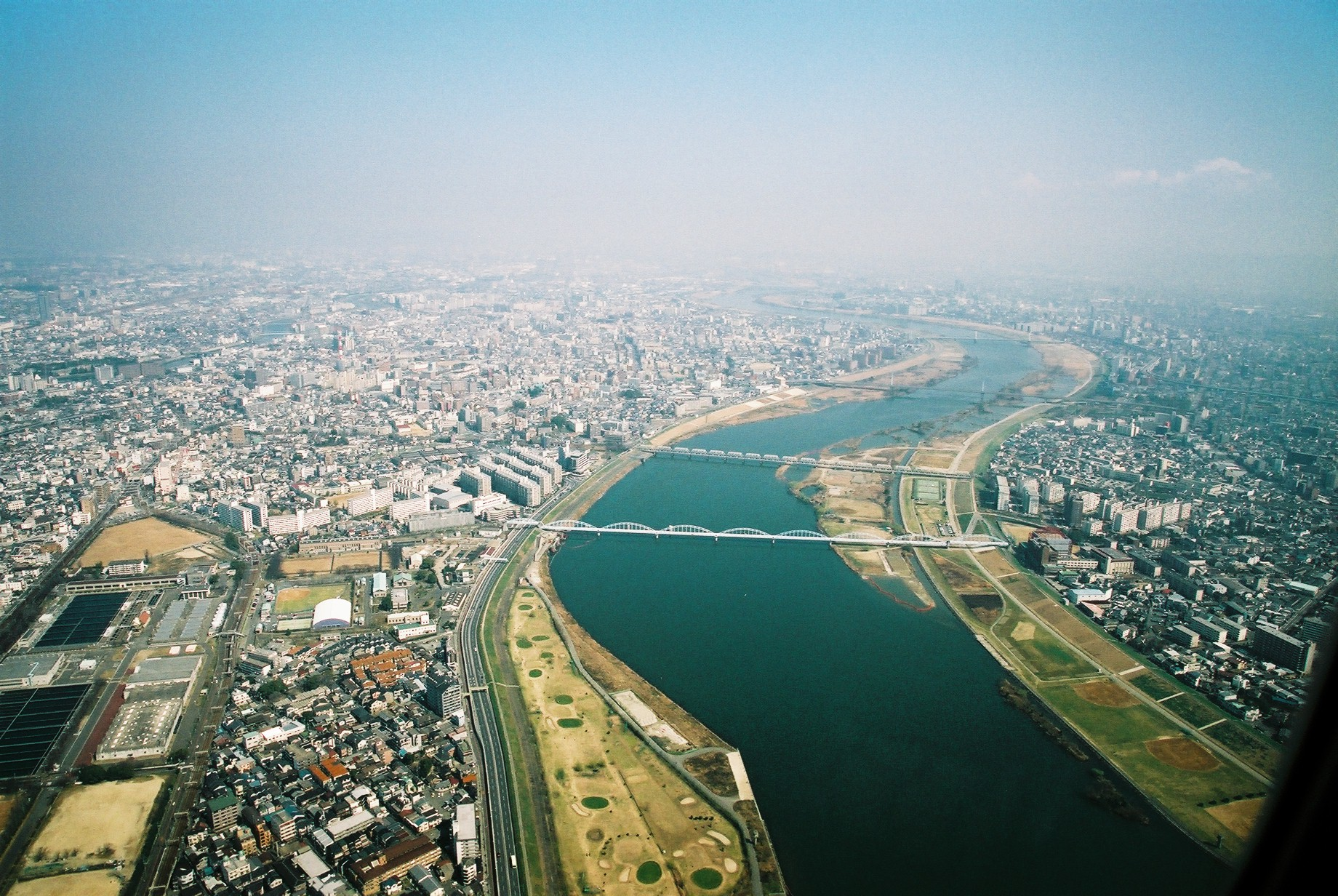
- Yodo River in north Osaka

- Location within Japan

Physical characteristics
- Source
  - location: Ōtsu, Shiga, Japan
- Mouth
  - location: Osaka Bay, Osaka, Japan
- Length: 75 km (47 mi)
- Basin size: 8,240 km^{2} (3,180 sq mi)

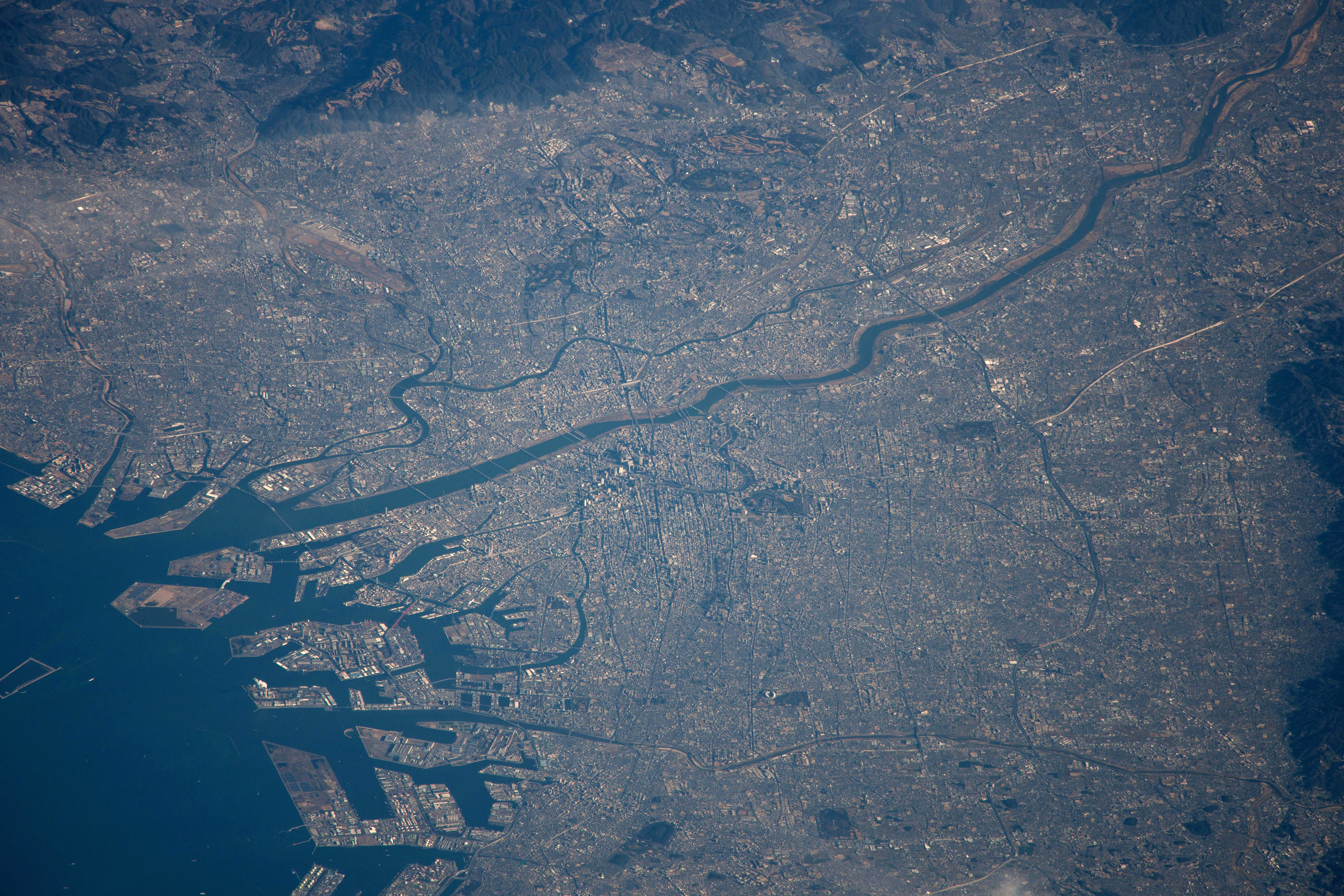
Aerial photo of Osaka and Yodo River

The Yodo River (淀川, Yodo-gawa), also called the Seta River (瀬田川 Seta-gawa) and the Uji River (宇治川 Uji-gawa) at portions of its route, is the principal river in Osaka Prefecture on Honshu, Japan. The source of the Class A river is Lake Biwa in Shiga Prefecture to the north.

The Yodo River, usually called the Seta River in Shiga Prefecture, begins at the southern outlet of the lake in Ōtsu. There is a dam there to regulate the lake level. Further downstream, the Seta flows into Kyoto Prefecture and its name changes to the Uji River. It then merges with two other rivers, the Katsura River and the Kizu River in Kyoto Prefecture. The Katsura has its headwaters in the mountains of Kyoto Prefecture, while the Kizu comes from Mie Prefecture. From the three-river confluence, the river is called the Yodo River, which flows south, through Osaka, and on into Osaka Bay. In Osaka, part of the river has been diverted into an artificial channel; the old course in the heart of Osaka is called the Kyū-Yodo River (literally, 'Former Yodo River'). It serves as a source of water for irrigation and also powers hydroelectric generators.

== History ==
The Yodo River basin has occupied an extremely important position as the center of Japanese politics, culture, and economy since ancient times. Therefore, river improvement works were repeated, starting with the construction of the Ibaraki embankment during the reign of Emperor Nintoku, but floods occurred frequently. The Nara Period monk Gyōki believed that in order to prevent flooding around Lake Biwa, it was necessary to drain more lake water into the Seta River, the only outflow river, and attempted to excavate a small mountain along the Seta River. Because this mountain jutted out into the river, there were places where the Seta River suddenly narrowed, and when heavy rain hit the upstream, the water was dammed and flooded the upstream frequently. In the end, Gyoki gave up the plan for fear that excavating the mountain would cause flooding downstream.

The choice of the ancient capital Heian-kyō (now Kyoto) during the Heian period, was partly chosen because of the presence of the Yodo river that flows towards Osaka, and its outlet on the Seto Inland Sea. Emperor Shirakawa, who lived in the late Heian period, listed flood control of the Kamo River, upstream of the Yodo River, as one of the "Three Undesirable Things in the World" that do not go as planned, along with the warrior monks of Enryaku-ji on Mount Hiei and the dice rolls in the game of sugoroku. The Uji River has a prominent place in the so-called "Uji chapters" of The Tale of Genji, a novel written by the Japanese noblewoman Murasaki Shikibu in the early eleventh century.

Toyotomi Hideyoshi, who unified the country during the Sengoku period, renovated the Uji River (Oguraike Pond) when he moved to Fushimi in his later years, including the construction of the Taikō Embankment. These levees led to Fushimi flourishing as a key transportation hub. During the Edo Period, the Kamo River to transport materials for the construction of the Great Buddha Hall of Hōkō-ji (the Great Buddha of Kyoto) at the command of Tokugawa Ieyasu, and the Takase River was excavated as a permanent canal. They developed water transportation to Kyoto and developed logistics. In Osaka, Dotonbori was excavated, and as the city, which had been devastated by the Siege of Osaka, was rebuilt, water transportation and bridges were also developed. Osaka was praised for its "808 bridges" compared to Edo's "808 towns." Furthermore, with the advancement of agricultural technology and the Tokugawa Shogunate's encouragement of new paddy field development, the reclamation of Oguraike Pond in Uji also began. As the economy became more active, the collection of firewood and charcoal and the development of new rice fields progressed, leading to deforestation in the river basin. The loss of forests led to the inflow of sediment from mountainous areas, which led to the rise of riverbeds, which caused flooding. For this reason, the Shogunate issued an order in 1660 banning the mining of tree stumps in Yamashiro, Yamato, and Iga Provinces. Dredges of the Seta River in the Edo period were first carried out in 1670, in response to petitions from villages along Lake Biwa, as a matter of national interest. In 1683, Inaba Masayasu and Kawamura Zuiken inspected the site, and in 1684, the year after Inaba's downfall, Kawamura carried out river improvement work. Furthermore, in 1699, a large-scale construction project called "Kawamura Zuiken's Great Construction" was carried out.

The river continued to play a very important role for the movement and transport of goods between Osaka and Kyoto, until the arrival of the first trains in the 1870s. In 1858, it is estimated there were 50 boats daily of all types that carried about 1,500 people from Osaka to Fushimi. In the 19th century, a trip by steamboat between Osaka and Fushimi could take 12 hours.

Nowadays, the Uji River, or the Yodo River in Kyoto Prefecture, is a popular fishing spot during the summer and fall months.

=== Taikō Embankment ===
The Taikō Embankment (宇治川太閤堤跡, Uji-gawa taikō zutsumi ato) was constructed by Toyotomi Hideyoshi on the right bank of the Uji River. Hideyoshi took the opportunity of the construction of Fushimi Castle, completed in 1594 to carry out large-scale flood control works such as rerouting the Uji River and Yodo River. Until then, the Uji River had branched off downstream of Ujibashi Bridge and flowed northwest, merging with Ogura Pond, but was now merged into a channel flowing north and led to Fushimi Castle. Some remains of the embankment survive into present-day in Todomaruyama, Uji Otogata, and other locations in Uji city. Parts that have been excavated include a bank and a sluice gate for regulating the water flow. The bank is thought to have continued in a straight line for about 400 meters (1,300 ft), and was built using various construction methods to reflect the topography. The sluice gate has stone protrusions and pile protrusions, and three stone protrusions have been confirmed at approximately 90 meters (300 ft) intervals. The plan is trapezoidal, with the front facing the river forming a gentle curve. The sides are made of stone walls, the inside of which is filled with broken stones, giving it the appearance of stone walls of a castle. The Taiko Embankment was gradually was buried by flooding and it is now outside the river area, so it is in an extremely well-preserved state. It was designated a National Historic Site in 2009. It is a short walk from Uji Station on the Keihan Electric Railway Uji Line.

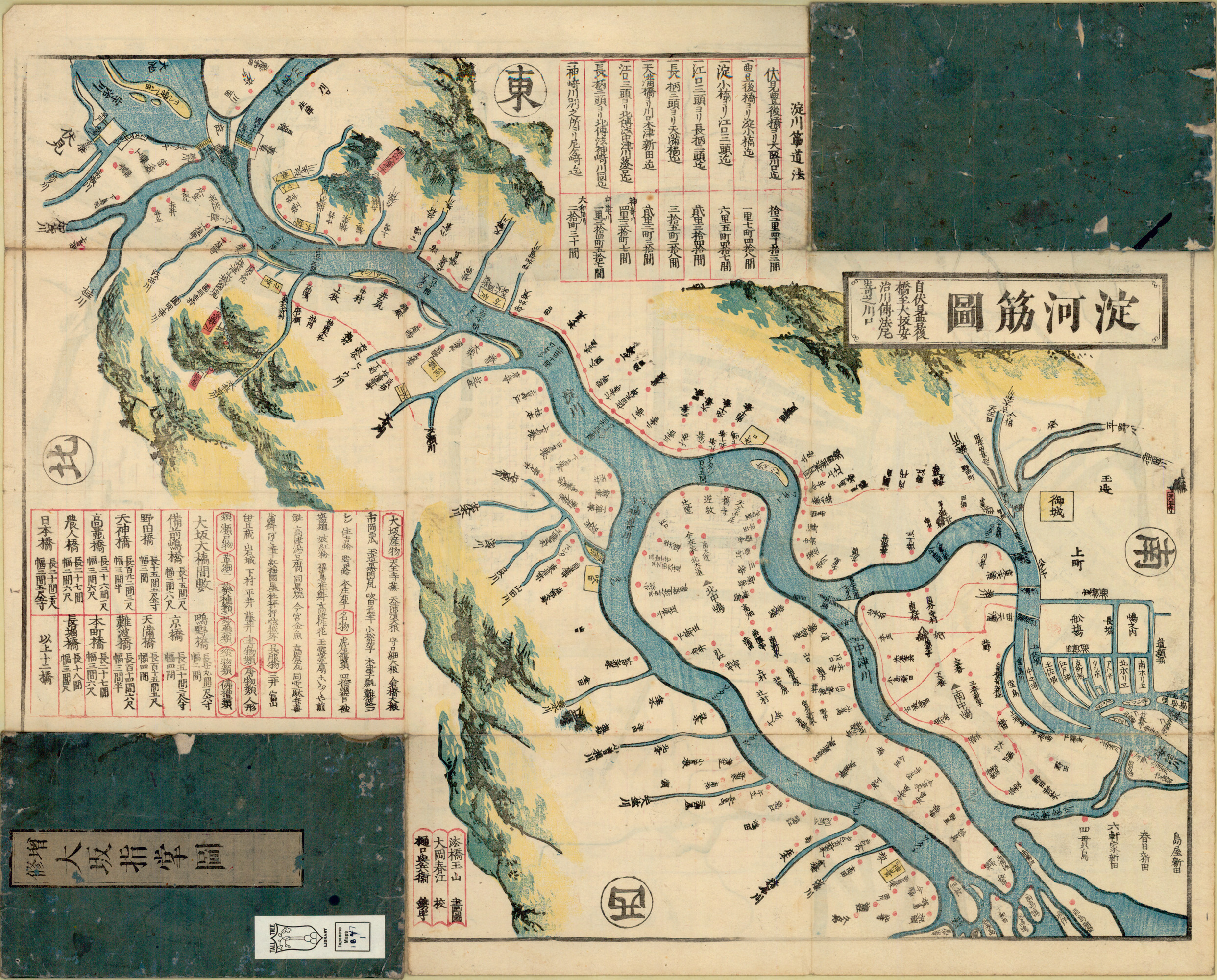
Map of the Yodo-gawa between Osaka and Fushimi (1847). The north is on the left and Osaka in the lower right corner.

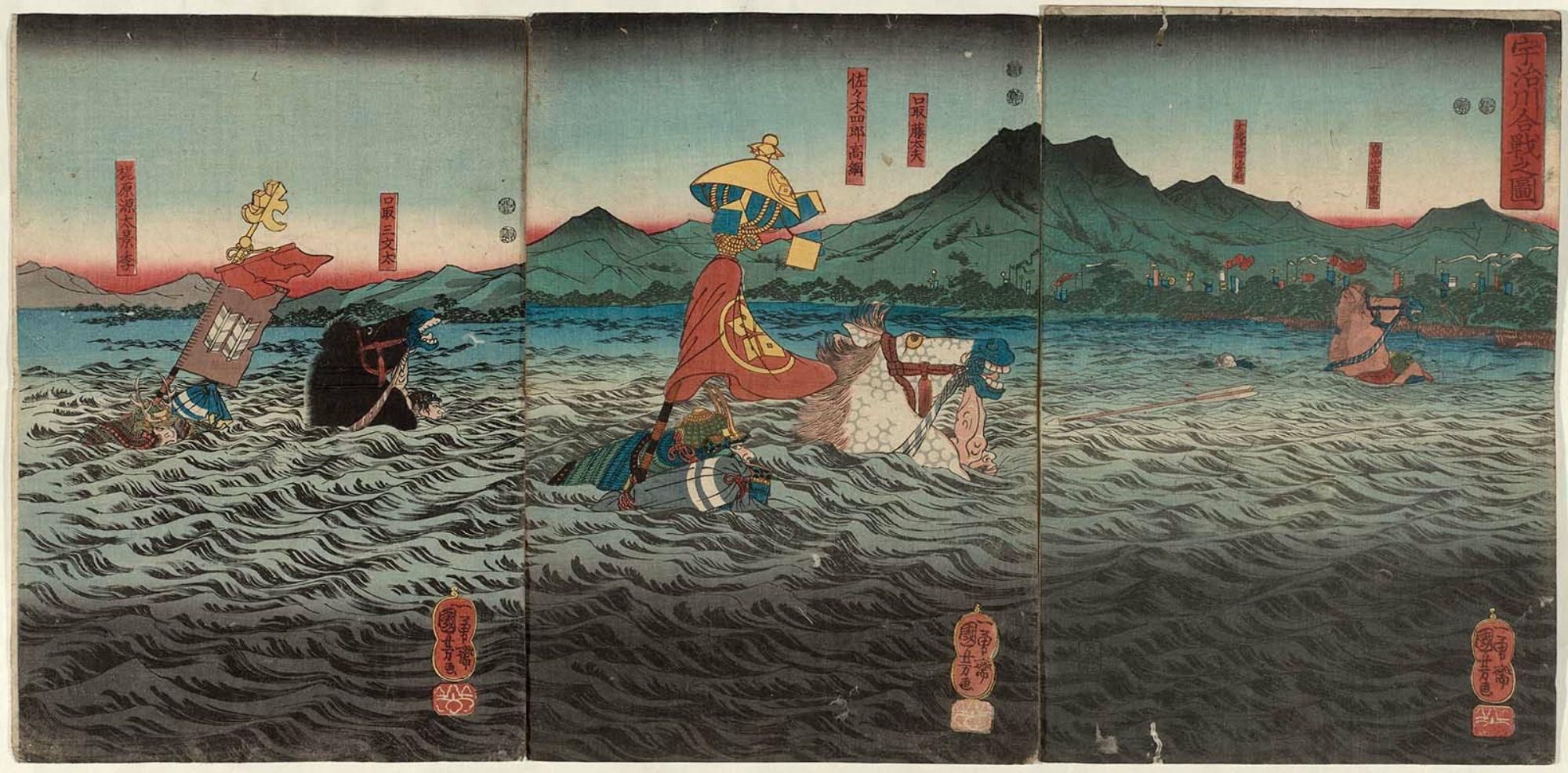
Kajiwara Kagesue, Sasaki Takatsuna, and Hatakeyama Shigetada racing to cross the Uji River before the second battle of Uji, by Utagawa Kuniyoshi

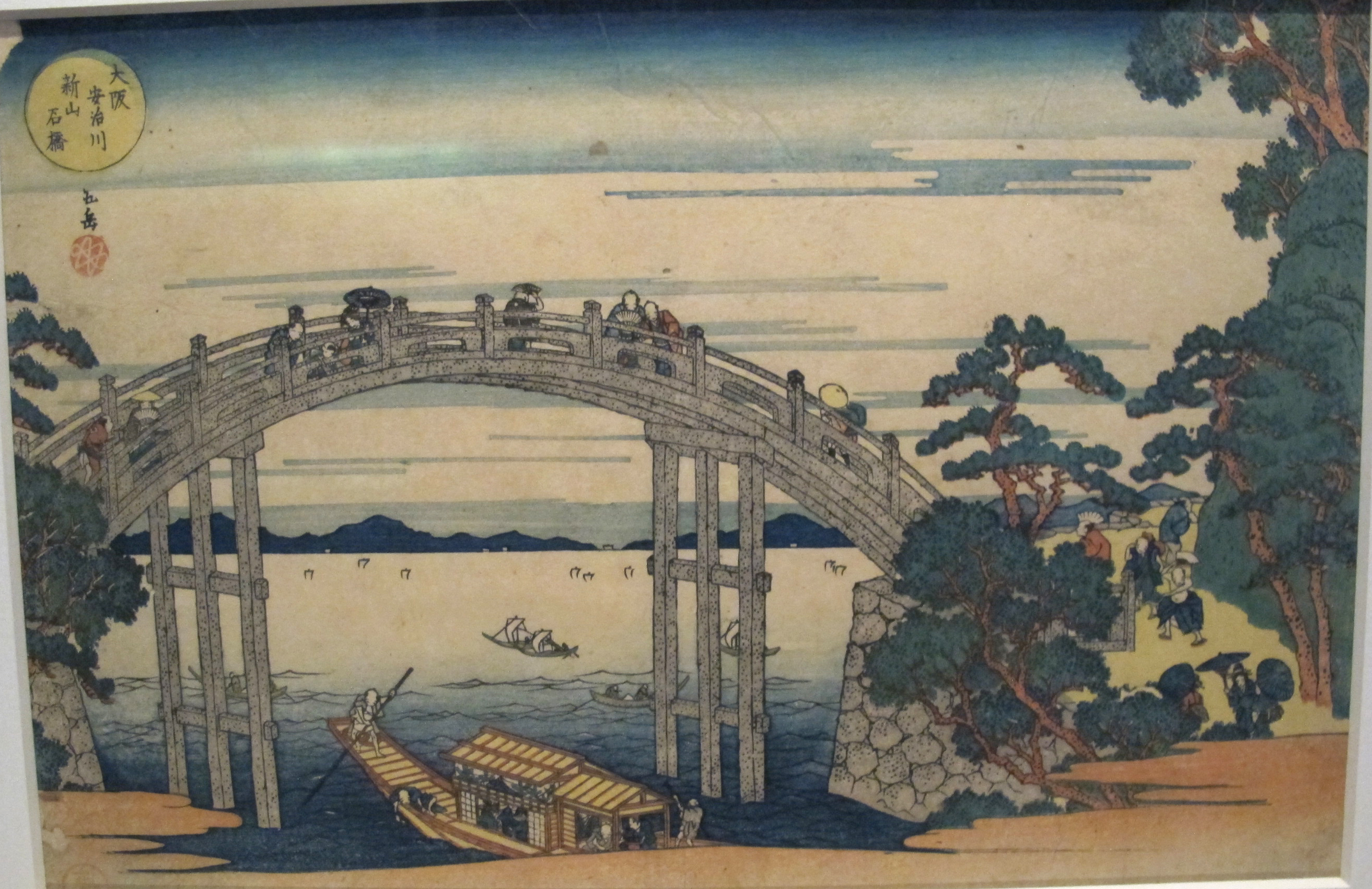
Yashima Gakutei

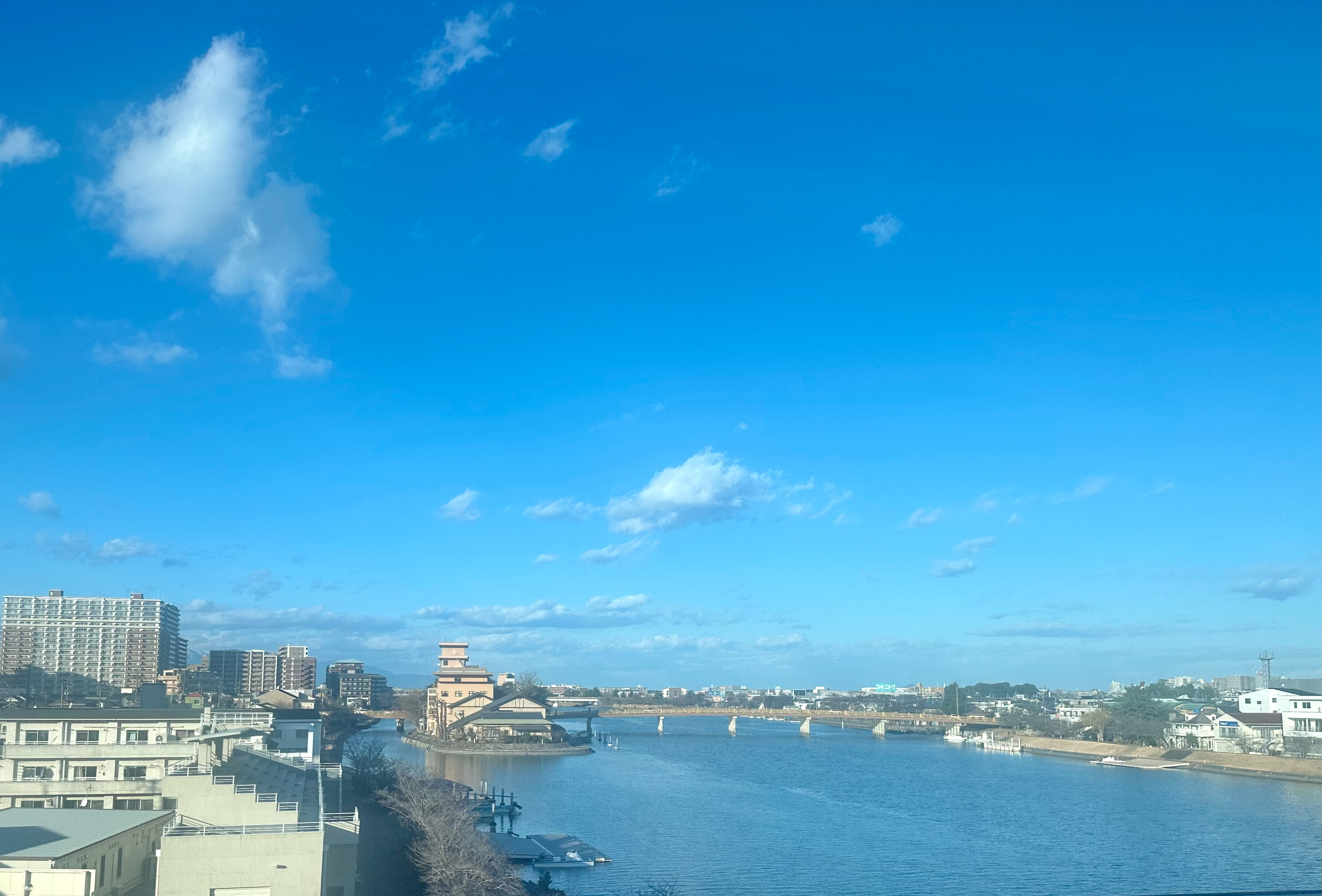
The part of the river called Seta River in Shiga Prefecture, 2025

== Transportation ==
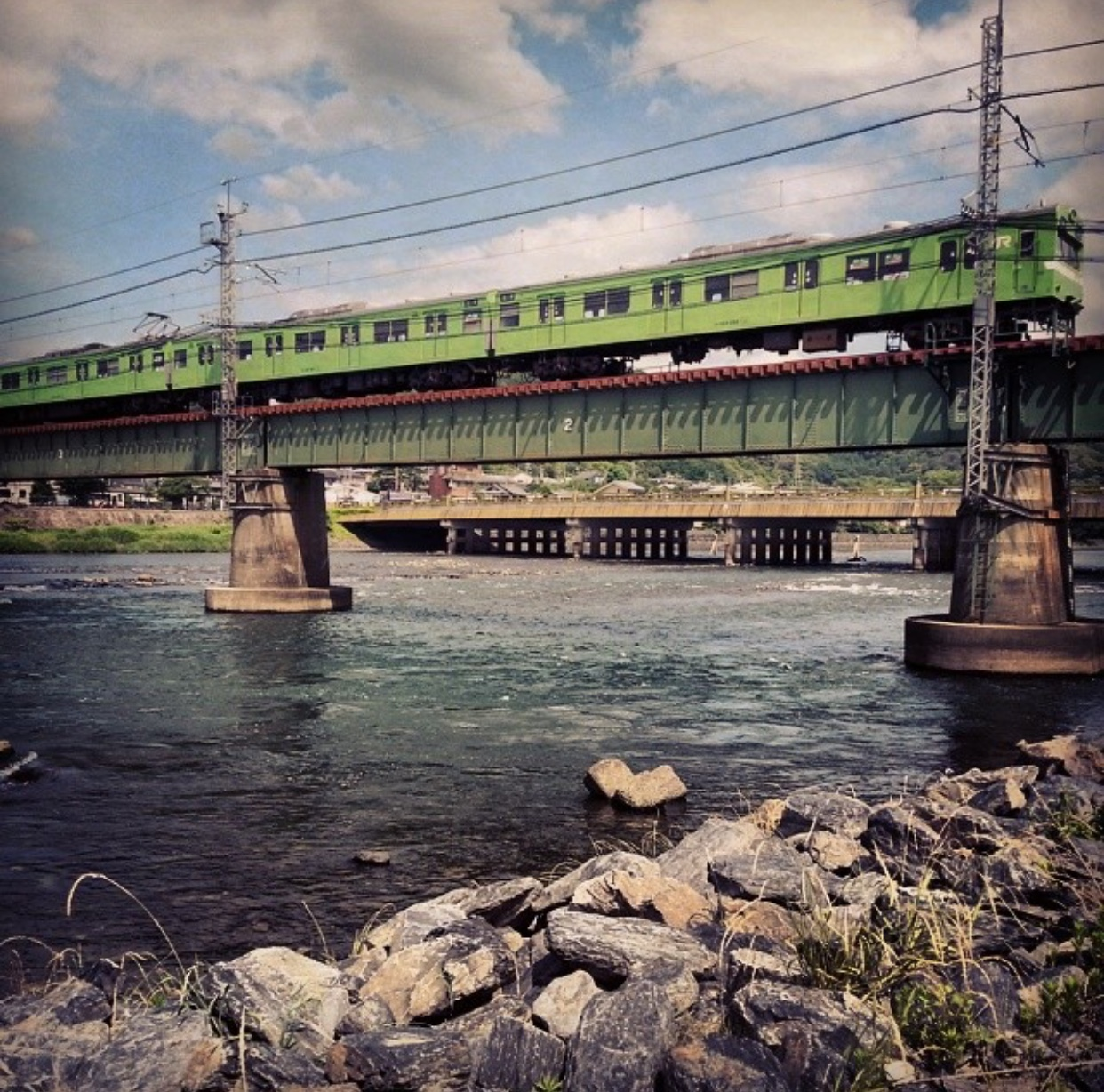
JR Nara Line train crossing the Uji River on the rail bridge in Uji, Japan

There are more than 50 bridges that cross the Yodo river. These include bridges for cars and trains.

=== Bridges ===
These bridges are arranged from upstream to downstream.

Bridge	Japanese	Route name
Setagawa Bridge	瀬田川橋梁	JR Tokaido Line
Setagawa Ōhashi Bridge	瀬田川大橋	National Route 1
Seta no Karahashi Bridge	瀬田の唐橋	Shiga Prefectural Road Route 2 Ōtsu-Notogawa-Nagahama Line
Setagawa Bridge	瀬田川橋梁	Tokaido Shinkansen
Setagawa Bridge	瀬田川橋	Meishin Expressway
Setagawa Bridge	瀬田川橋	Keiji Bypass
Setagawa Araizeki Weir (Nangō Araizeki Weir)	瀬田川洗堰 （南郷洗堰）	Shiga Prefectural Road Route 108; Nangō-Kiryū-Kusatsu Line
Setagawa Reiwa Ōhashi Bridge	瀬田川令和大橋	National Route 422 (Ōishi-Higashi Bypass)
Shishitobi Bridge	鹿跳橋	Shiga Prefecture Road Route 29; Seta-Ōishihigashi Line
Minami-Ōtsu Ōhashi Bridge (South Ōtsu Bridge)	南大津大橋	
Sotsuka Ōhashi Bridge	曽束大橋	Shiga/Kyoto Prefectural Road Route 3 Ōtsu-Nangō-Uji Line
Kisen-Yama Ōhashi Bridge	喜撰山大橋	It leads to a power plant, and it is currently off-limits.
Ōmine Bridge	大峰橋	Cars cannot enter, and the road ends after crossing the bridge.
Hakkō Bridge	白虹橋	
Amagase Suspension Bridge	天ヶ瀬吊橋	Pedestrian only
Uji Bridge	宇治橋	Kyoto Prefectural Road Route 7 Kyoto-Uji Line
Ujigawa Bridge	宇治川橋梁	JR Nara Line
Ujigawa Aqueduct Bridge	宇治川水管橋	
Ujigawa Bridge	宇治川橋	Keiji Bypass and the side road
Ingen Bridge	隠元橋	Kyoto Prefectural Road Route 245 Ōbaku Sta. Line
Shin-Kangetsu Bridge	新観月橋	National Route 24 (bypass part)
Kangetsu Bridge	観月橋	National Route 24
Yodogawa Bridge	澱川橋梁	Kintetsu Kyoto Line
Ogura Ōhashi Bridge	巨椋大橋	Daini Keihan Expressway (Second Keihan Highway) and National Route 1 (Rakunan Road)
Ujigawa Ōhashi	宇治川大橋	National Route 1 (Keihan Kokudo)
Yodo Ōhashi Bridge	淀大橋	Kyoto Prefectural Road Route 15 Uji-Yodo Line
Ujigawa Bridge	宇治川橋梁	Keihan Main Line
Iwashimizu Ōhashi Bridge	石清水大橋	National Route 478 and Keiji Bypass
Ujigawa Gokō Bridge	宇治川御幸橋	Kyoto/Osaka Prefectural Road Route 13; Kyoto-Moriguchi Line
Hirakata Ōhashi Bridge	枚方大橋	National Route 170 (Osaka Outer Loop Road)
Yodogawa Shinbashi Bridge	淀川新橋	Osaka Prefectural Road Route 19; Ibaraki-Neyagawa Line
Torikai-Niwaji Ōhashi Bridge	鳥飼仁和寺大橋	Osaka Prefectural Road Route 15 Yao-Ibaraki Line
Osaka Monorail Yodogawa Bridge	大阪モノレール淀川橋梁	Osaka Monorail Main Line
Torikai Ōhashi Bridge	鳥飼大橋	Osaka Prefectural Road Route 2 Osaka Central Circular Route and Kinki Expressway
Toyosato Ōhashi Bridge	豊里大橋	National Route 479 (Osaka Inner Loop Road)
Sugawara-Jōhoku Ōhashi Bridge	菅原城北大橋	Osaka City Road Kamishinjō-Ikuno Line
Yodogawa Bridge	淀川橋梁	JR Osaka Higashi Line
Yodo River Weir (Yodogawa Weir)	淀川大堰	The general public is not allowed to pass through.
Yodogawa Bridge	淀川橋梁	Hankyu Senri Line
Nagara Bridge	長柄橋	Osaka/Kyoto Prefectural Road Route 14; Osaka-Takatsuki-Kyoto Line (Tenjinbashi-Suji Street)
Kami Yodogawa Bridge	上淀川橋梁	JR Tokaido Line
Shin-Yodogawa Ōhashi Bridge	新淀川大橋	National Route 423 (Shin-Midō-Suji Street) and Osaka Metro Midosuji Line
Jūsō Ōhashi Bridge	十三大橋	National Route 176 (Jūsō-Suji Street)
NTT Jūsō Senyou Bridge (NTT Juso Bridge)	NTT十三専用橋	Only communication line
Shin-Jūsō Ōhashi Bridge	新十三大橋	National Route 176 (Jūsō Bypass)
Shimo Yodogawa Bridge	下淀川橋梁	JR Tokaido Line
Yodogawa Bridge	淀川橋	Hanshin Expressway Route 11 Ikeda Line
Yodogawa Ōhashi Bridge	淀川大橋	National Route 2 (Hanshin Kokudo)
Yodogawa Bridge	淀川橋梁	Hanshin Main Line
Yodogawa Bridge	淀川橋	Hanshin Expressway Route 3 Kobe Line
Yodogawa Bridge	淀川橋梁	Hanshin Namba Line
Denpo Ōhashi Bridge	伝法大橋	National Route 43 (Daini Hanshin Kokudo)
Shin-Denpo Ōhashi Bridge	新伝法大橋	National Route 43 (bypass part)
Shin-Yodogawa Bridge	新淀川橋	Hanshin Expressway Route 5 Bayshore Line
