= Kawamura Zuiken =

Japanese businessman

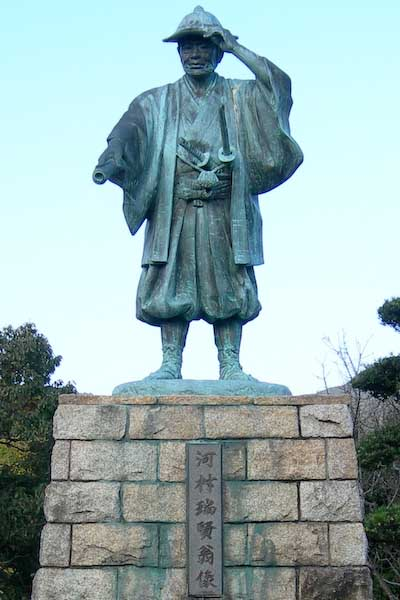
- The statue of Kawamura Zuiken at his home village, Minamiise, Watarai, Mie, Japan
- Born: 1618
- Died: 1700 (aged 81–82)
- Occupation: Businessman
- Years active: 1630–1698
- Honours: Hatamoto

Kawamura Zuiken (1618–1700) was a Japanese businessman. He was born in the village of Ukura in the province of Ise. The name Zuiken is a religious name taken when he entered the Buddhist clergy; later he returned to using the name Hiradayu. Kawamura Zuiken was influential in the development of Japanese ocean trading routes.

== Shipping Routes ==
He established a new route for the shipment of rice from the Tohoku region of northern Japan to Edo, significantly reducing the time required for transportation. This new route, known as the Higashimawari (Eastern Circuit), involved transporting rice down the Abukuma River to Arahama on the Pacific coast, and then shipping it around the Boso Peninsula to Edo. Previously, this process had taken a year to complete.

In 1672, he devised a second route, the Nishimawari (Western Circuit), which transported rice from northern Japan through the Shimonoseki Straits and the Inland Sea to Edo, reducing the transport time to three months.

In 1683, he undertook a project to clear the outlets of the Yodo River in the Osaka region. This involved extensive work on the Agi, Nagara, and Nakatsu rivers.
