= Kita Futo Station =

Railway station in Kobe, Japan

Kita Futo Station 北埠頭駅
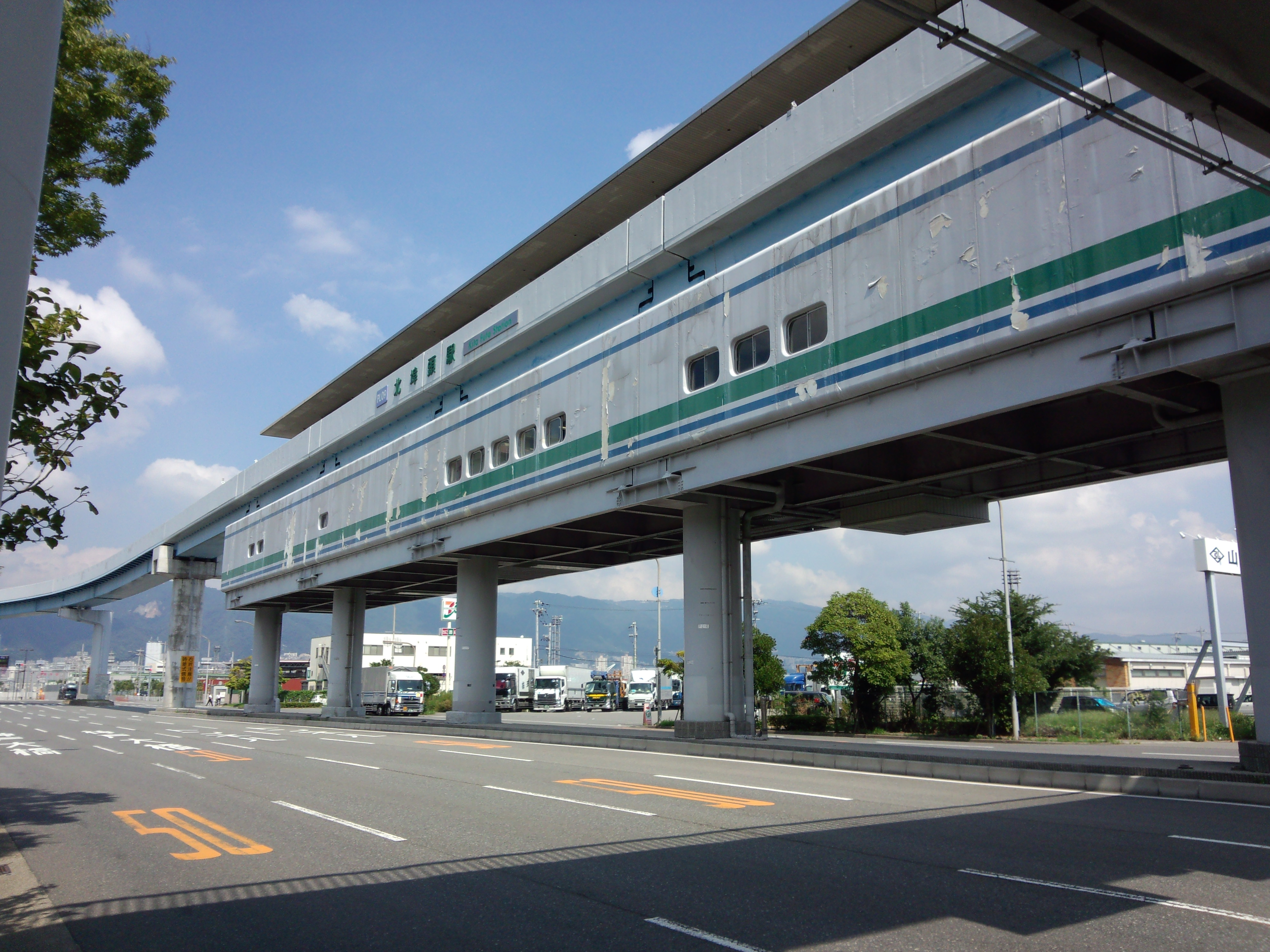
- Station exterior

General information
- Location: Chūō-ku, Kobe; Japan
- Coordinates: 34°40′25″N 135°12′53″E
- Operator: Kobe New Transit
- Line: Port Island Line
- Distance: 1.7 km from Shimin Hiroba
- Platforms: 1 side platform

Construction
- Structure type: Elevated

Other information
- Station code: PL09

History
- Opened: February 5, 1981

Passengers
- 1,774 per day (2017)
Location

Kita Futo Station (北埠頭駅, Kita Futō Eki) is a railway station operated by Kobe New Transit in Chūō-ku, Kobe, Japan. It is located on Port Island and is served by the loop portion of the Port Island Line, and trains only run northbound towards Sannomiya.

== Ridership ==
Ridership per day
Year	Ridership
2011	1,800
2012	1,724
2013	1,773
2014	1,840
2015	1,839
2016	1,775
2017	1,774

== Adjacent stations ==
«	Service	»
Loop line (northbound only)
Naka Futo	To Sannomiya	Naka Koen
