= Minatojima Station =

Railway station in Kobe, Japan

Minatojima Station みなとじま駅
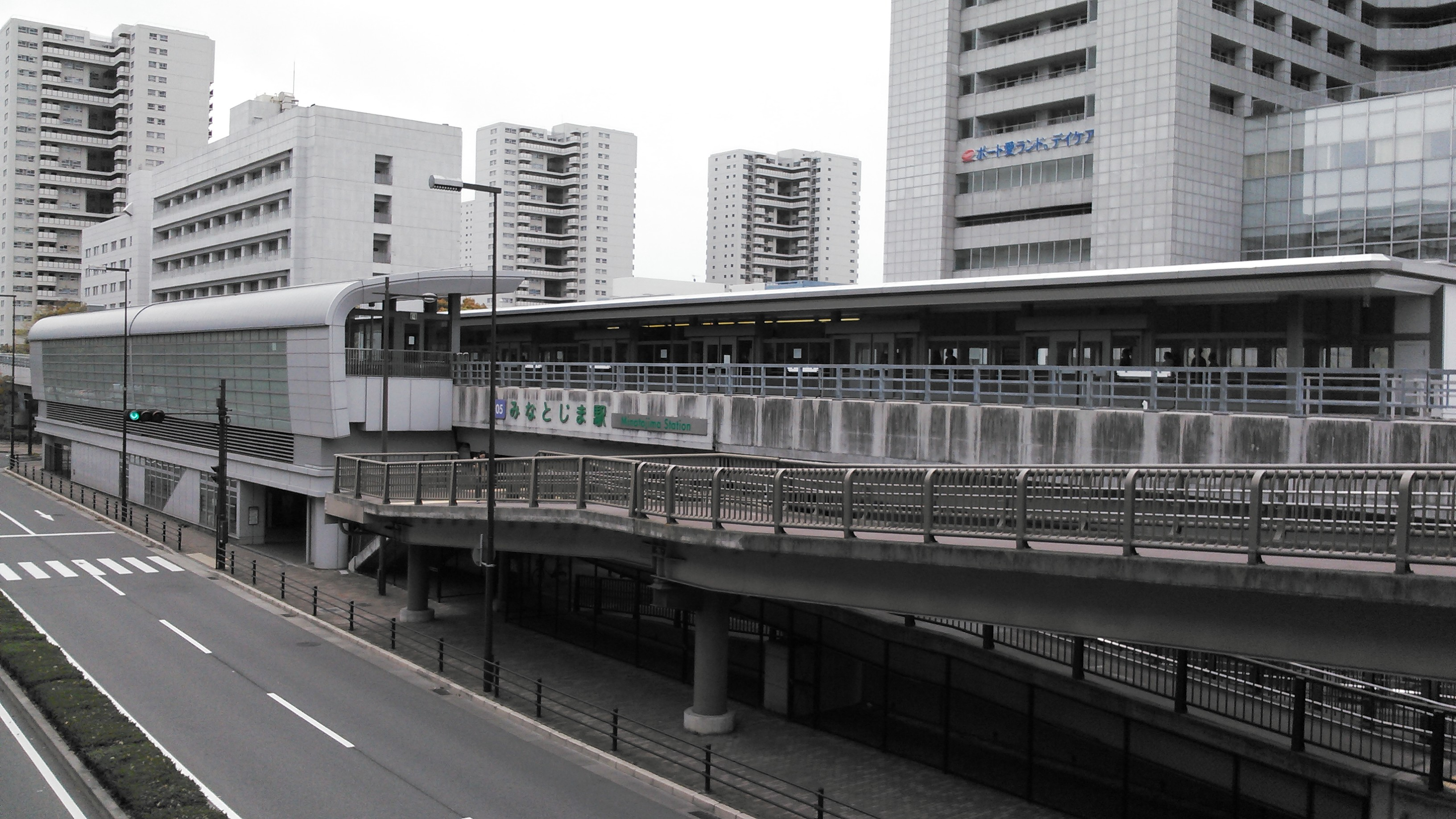
- Station exterior

General information
- Location: Chūō-ku, Kobe; Japan
- Coordinates: 34°40′08″N 135°12′36″E
- Operator: Kobe New Transit
- Line: Port Island Line
- Distance: 3.3 km from Sannomiya
- Platforms: 2 side platforms

Construction
- Structure type: Elevated

Other information
- Station code: P05

History
- Opened: February 5, 1981

Passengers
- 16,660 per day (2017)
Location

Minatojima Station (みなとじま駅, Minatojima Eki) is a railway station operated by Kobe New Transit in Chūō-ku, Kobe, Japan. Situated on Port Island, it is a station on the Port Island Line.

Originally named Shimin Byoin Mae Station (市民病院前駅), the station was renamed in 2011. The station is also known as Campus Mae Station (キャンパス前), a name that references the Port Island campus of nearby Kobe Gakuin University.

== Ridership ==
Ridership per day
| Year | Ridership |
|---|---|
| 2011 | 13,800 |
| 2012 | 13,074 |
| 2013 | 13,717 |
| 2014 | 13,823 |
| 2015 | 15,066 |
| 2016 | 16,357 |
| 2017 | 16,660 |

== Gallery ==
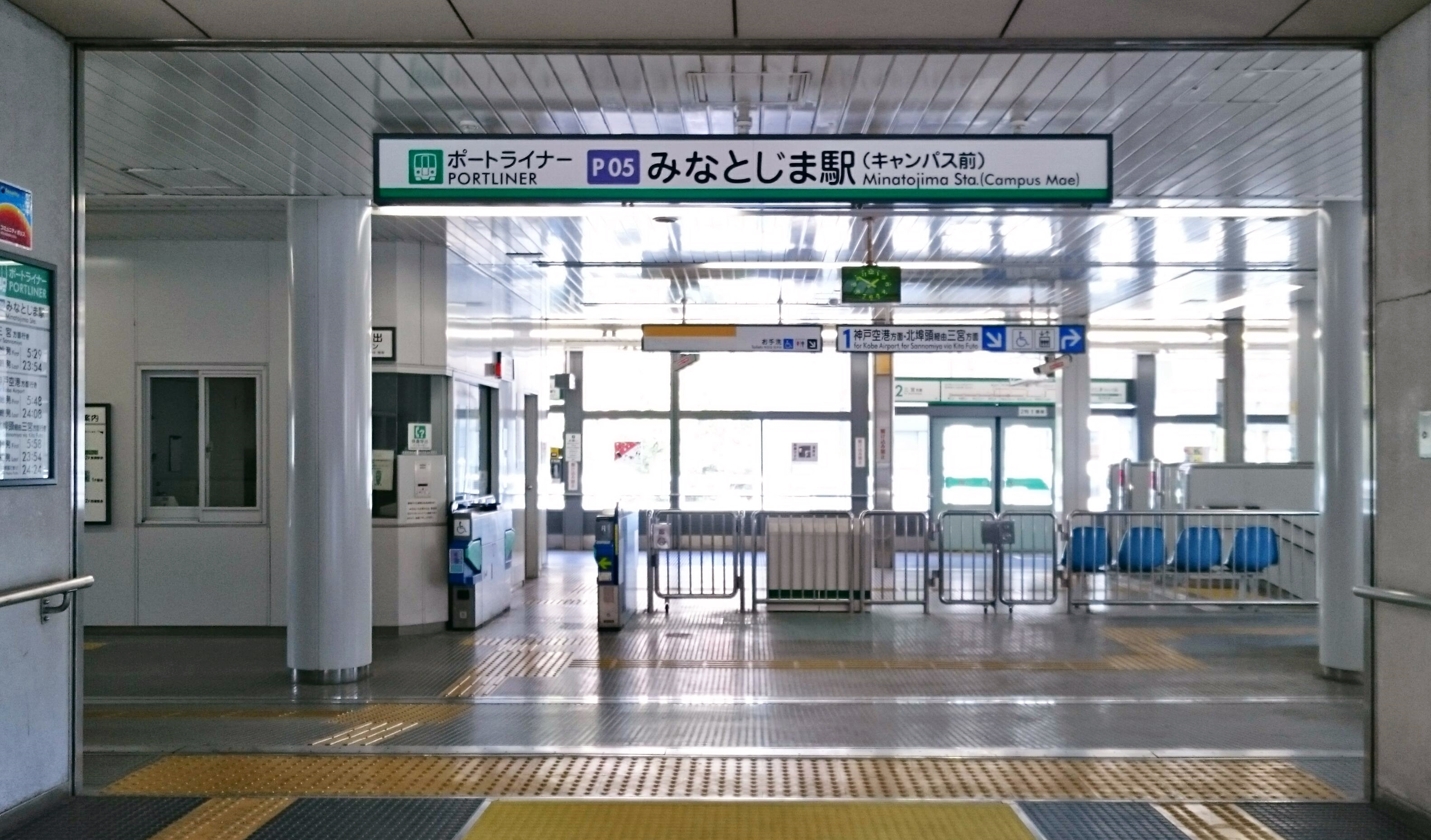
Fare gates

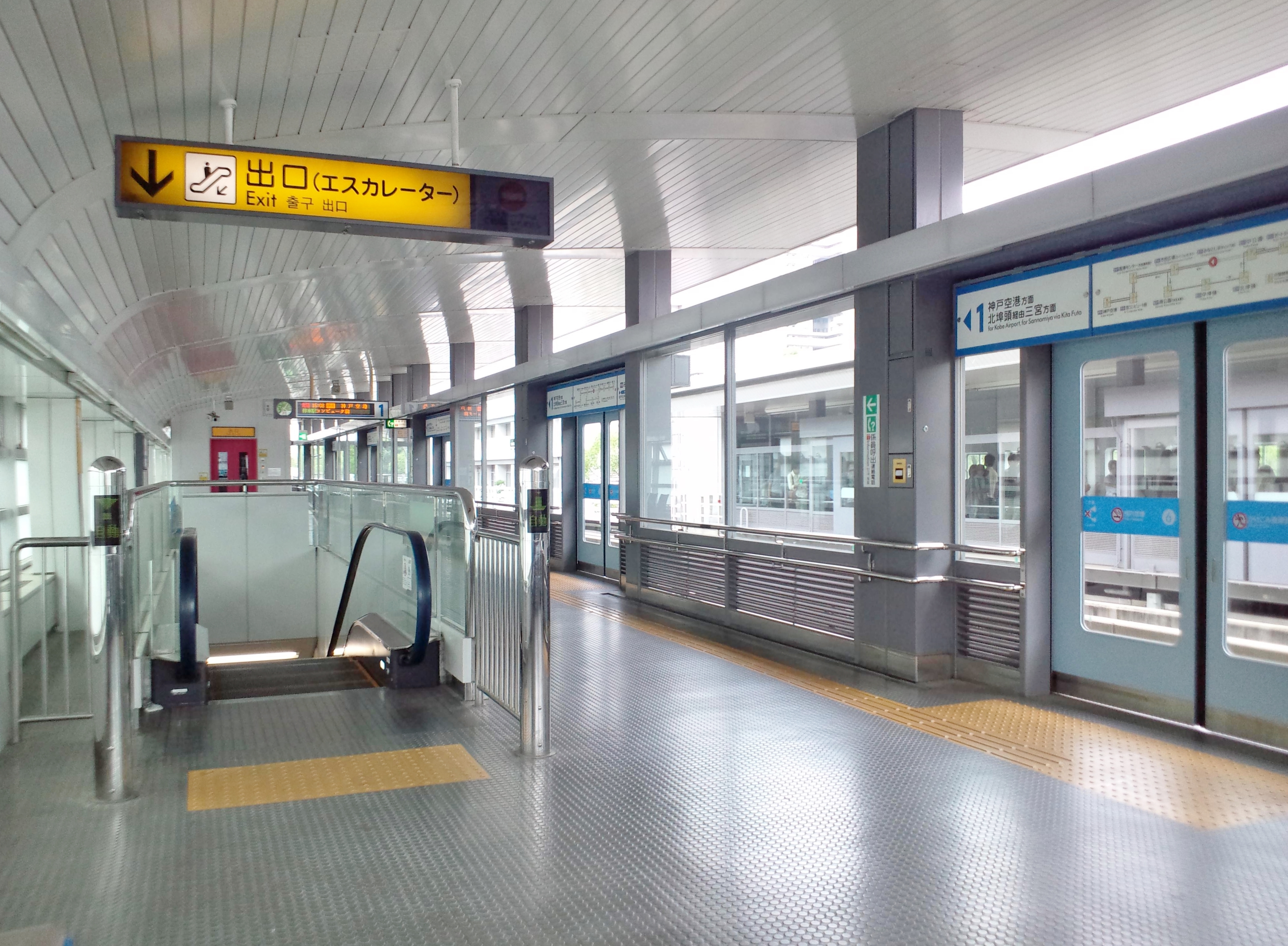
Platform 1

== Adjacent stations ==
| « | Service | » |
Main line (Sannomiya–Kobe Airport)
| Naka Koen | - | Shimin Hiroba |
Loop line (one-way only)
| Naka Koen | To Naka Futo | Shimin Hiroba |
