= Iryo Center Station =

Railway station in Kobe, Japan

Coordinates: 34.6585°N 134.2163°E

Iryo Center Station 医療センター駅
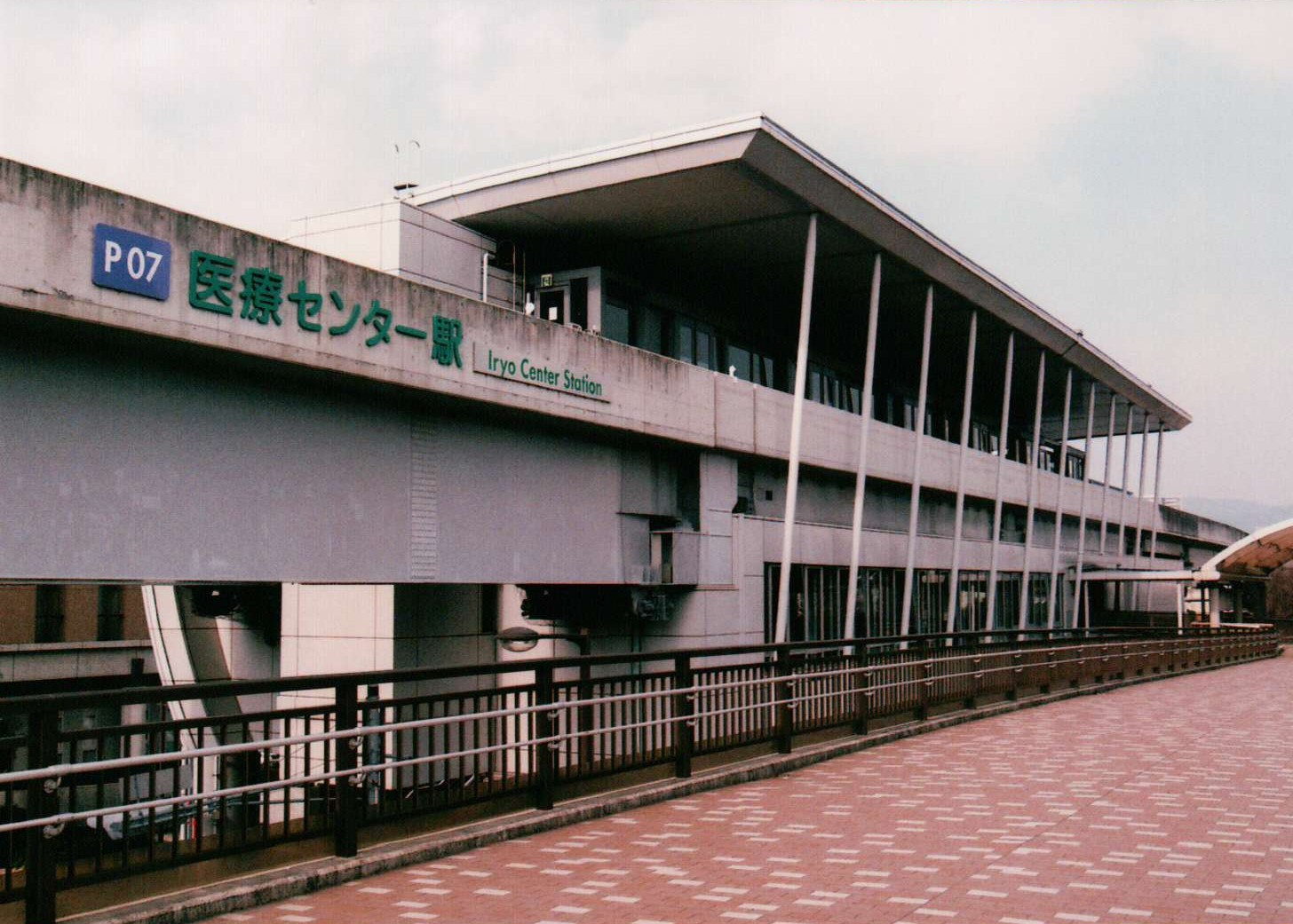
- Station exterior

General information
- Location: Chūō-ku, Kobe; Japan
- Operator: Kobe New Transit
- Line: Port Island Line
- Distance: 4.6 km from Sannomiya
- Platforms: 1 island platforms

Construction
- Structure type: Elevated

Other information
- Station code: P07

History
- Opened: February 2, 2006

Passengers
- 14,971 per day (2017)
Location

Iryo Center Station (医療センター駅, Iryō Sentā Eki) is a railway station operated by Kobe New Transit in Chūō-ku, Kobe, Japan. It is located on Port Island and is served by the Port Island Line. The station is alternatively known as Shimin Byoin Mae Station (市民病院前). The station name is derived from its location next to the Kobe City Medical Center General Hospital.

Prior to 1 July 2011, the station was named Sentan Iryo Center Station (先端医療センター).

== Ridership ==
Ridership per day
Year	Ridership
2011	10800
2012	12,189
2013	12,684
2014	13,447
2015	13,701
2016	14,158
2017	14,971

== Gallery ==
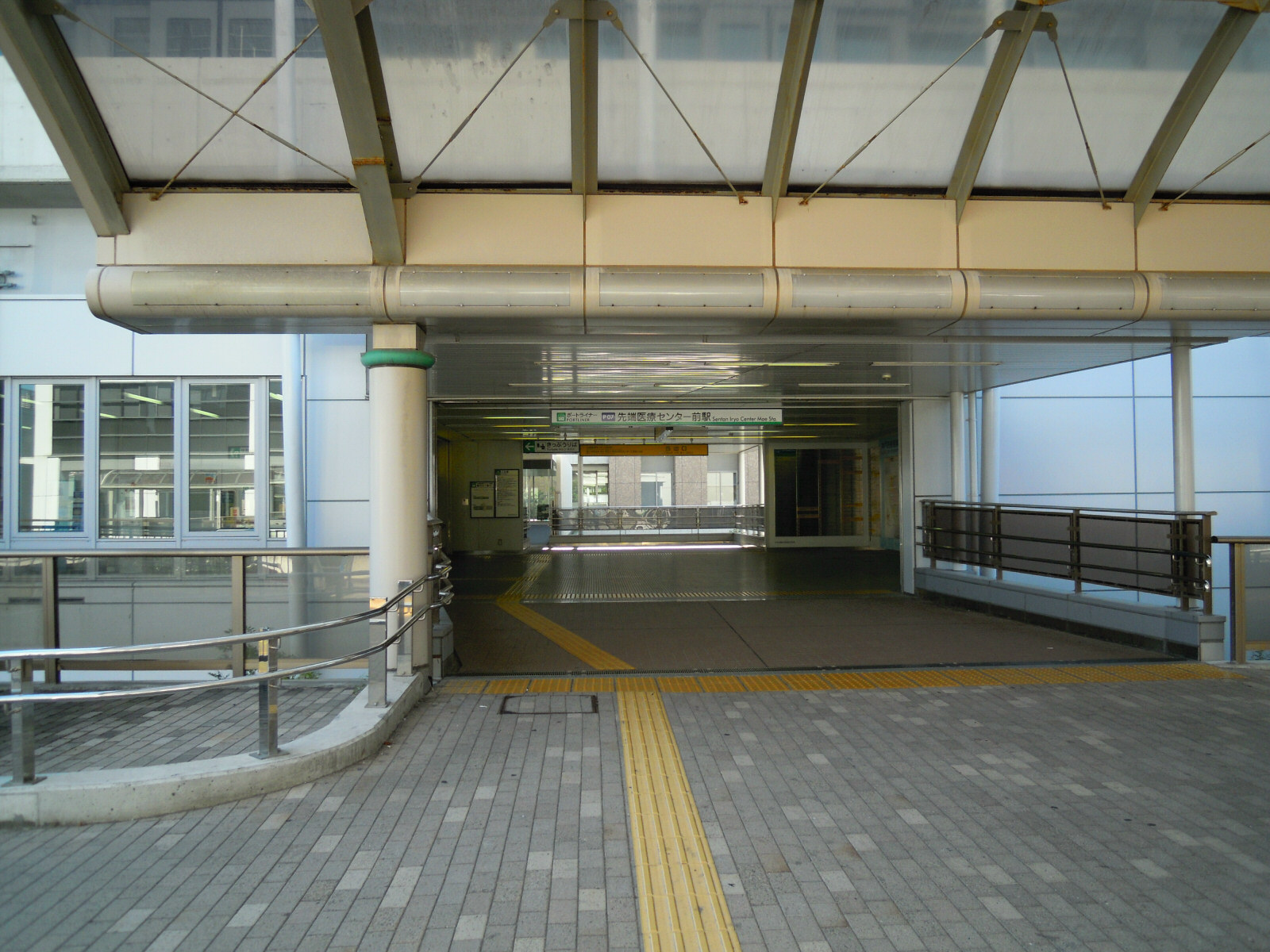
Station entrance

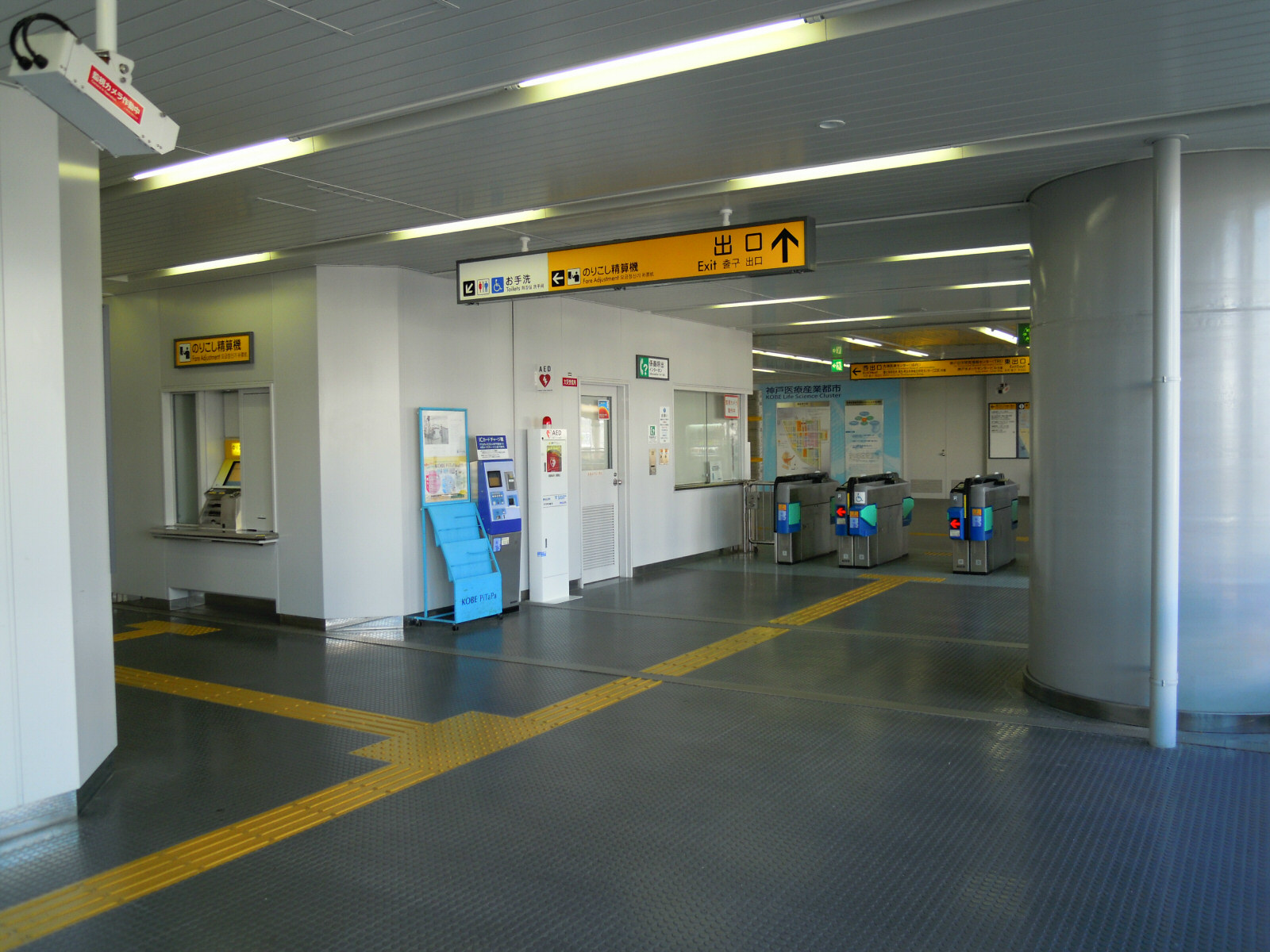
Fare gates

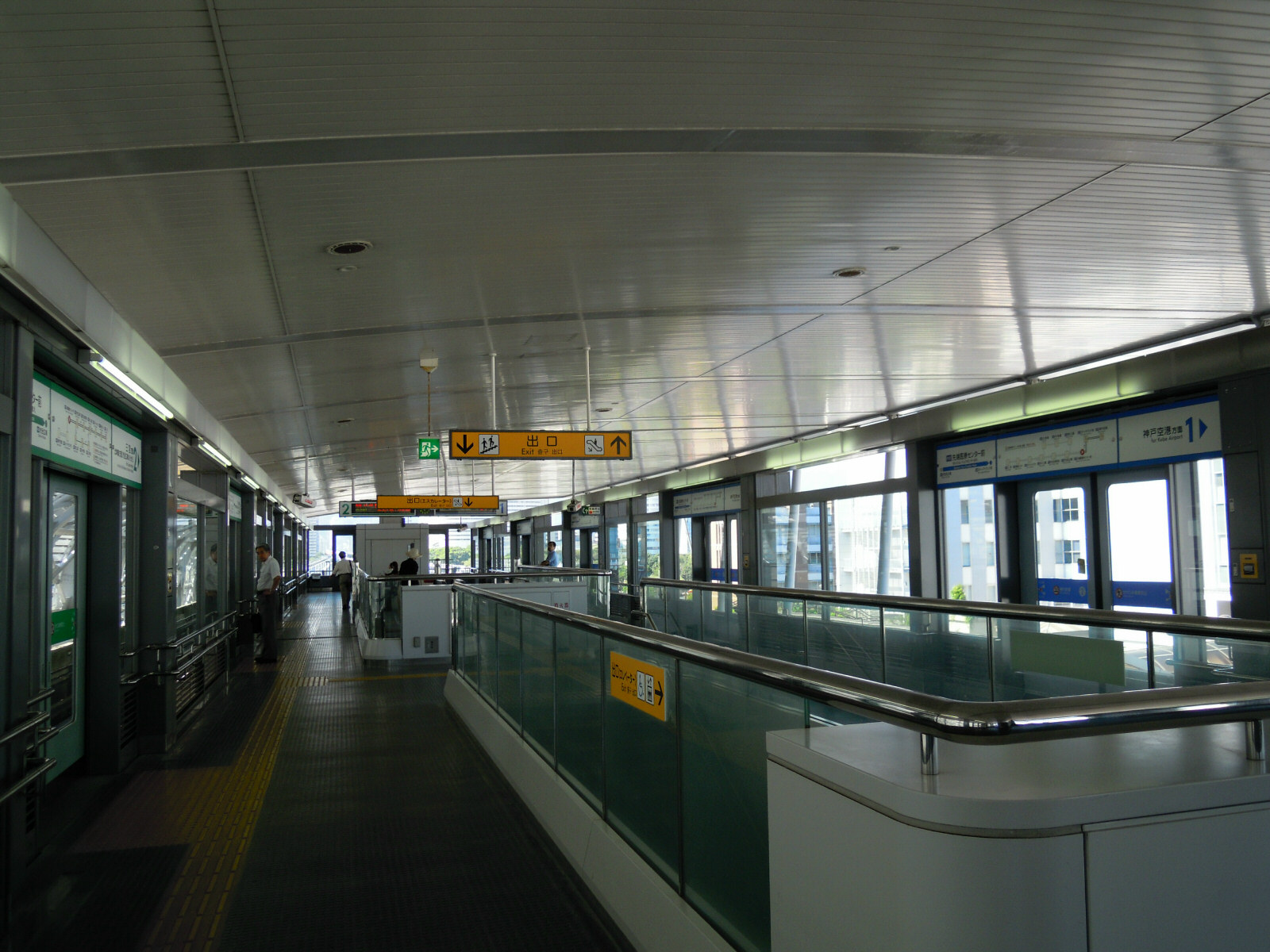
Station platform

== Adjacent stations ==
«	Service	»
Main line (Sannomiya–Kobe Airport)
Shimin Hiroba	-	Keisan Kagaku Center
