= Keisan Kagaku Center Station =

Railway station in Kobe, Japan

Keisan Kagaku Center Station 計算科学センター駅
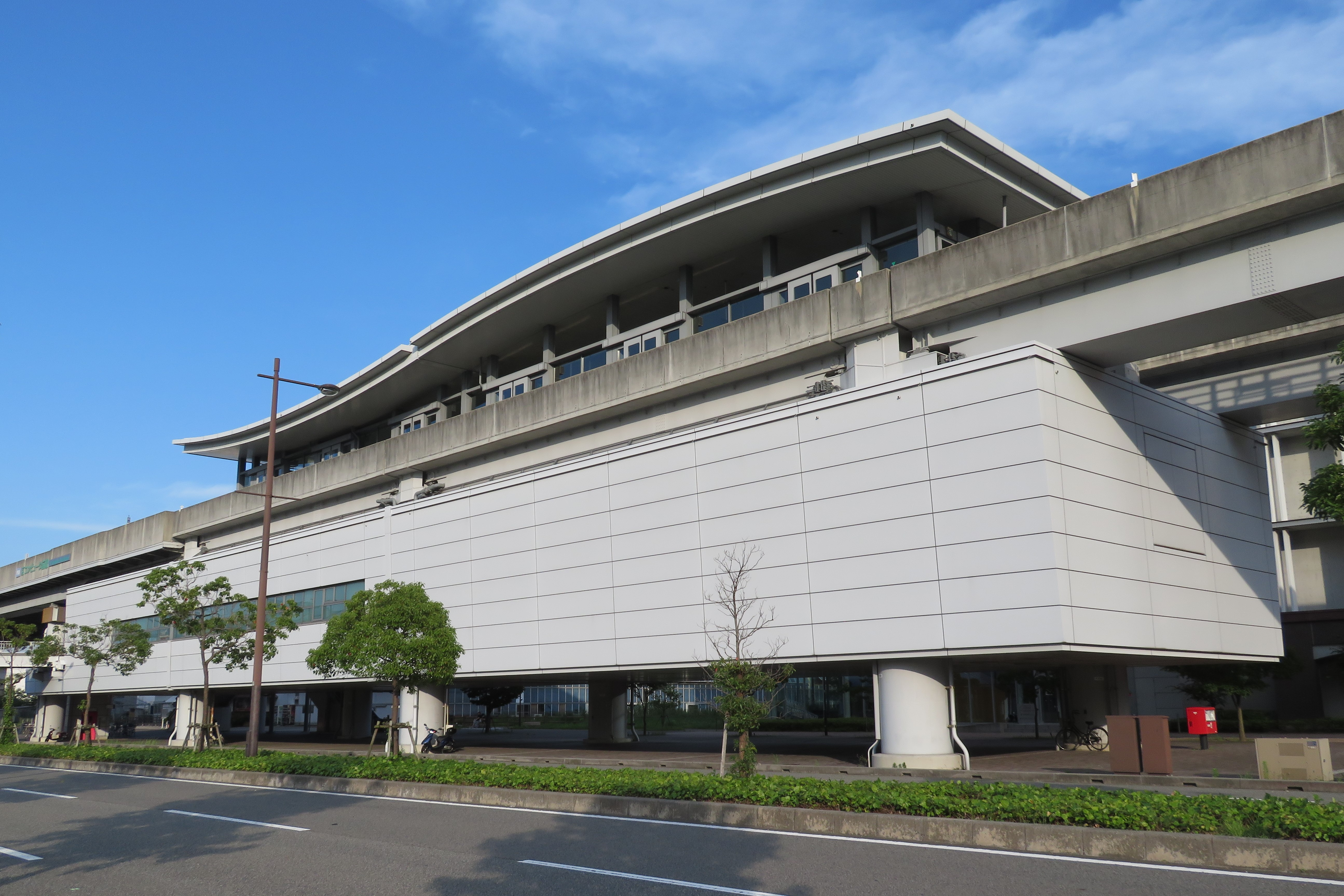
- Station exterior

General information
- Location: Chūō-ku, Kobe; Japan
- Coordinates: 34°39′17″N 135°13′17″E
- Operator: Kobe New Transit
- Line: Port Island Line
- Distance: 5.4 km from Sannomiya
- Platforms: 1 island platforms

Construction
- Structure type: Elevated

Other information
- Station code: P08

History
- Opened: February 2, 2006
- Former names: Port Island Minami (until 2011); K Computer Mae (until 2021)

Passengers
- 3,911 per day (2017)
Location

Keisan Kagaku Center Station (計算科学センター駅, Keisan Kagaku Sentā Eki) is a railway station operated by Kobe New Transit in Chūō-ku, Kobe, Japan. It is located on Port Island and is served by the Port Island Line. The station name is taken from the nearby Riken Advanced Institute for Computational Science. The station is subtitled as Kobe Animal Kingdom, Fugaku Mae (神戸どうぶつ王国・「富岳」前), named after the nearby theme park and the supercomputer located in the institute.

The station was originally named Port Island Minami Station (ポートアイランド南駅). On 1 July 2011, the station was renamed to K Computer Mae Station (京コンピュータ前駅, Kei Konpyūta Mae Eki) with the namesake of K computer, the supercomputer then being developed at the institute. Following the decommissioning of K computer, the station was renamed to the current name on 19 June 2021.

== Ridership ==
Ridership per day
Year	Ridership
2011	2,200
2012	2,230
2013	2,299
2014	2,845
2015	3,352
2016	3,545
2017	3,911

== Adjacent stations ==
«	Service	»
Main line (Sannomiya–Kobe Airport)
Iryo Center	-	Kobe Airport
