= Shimin Hiroba Station =

Railway station in Kobe, Japan

Shimin Hiroba Station 市民広場駅
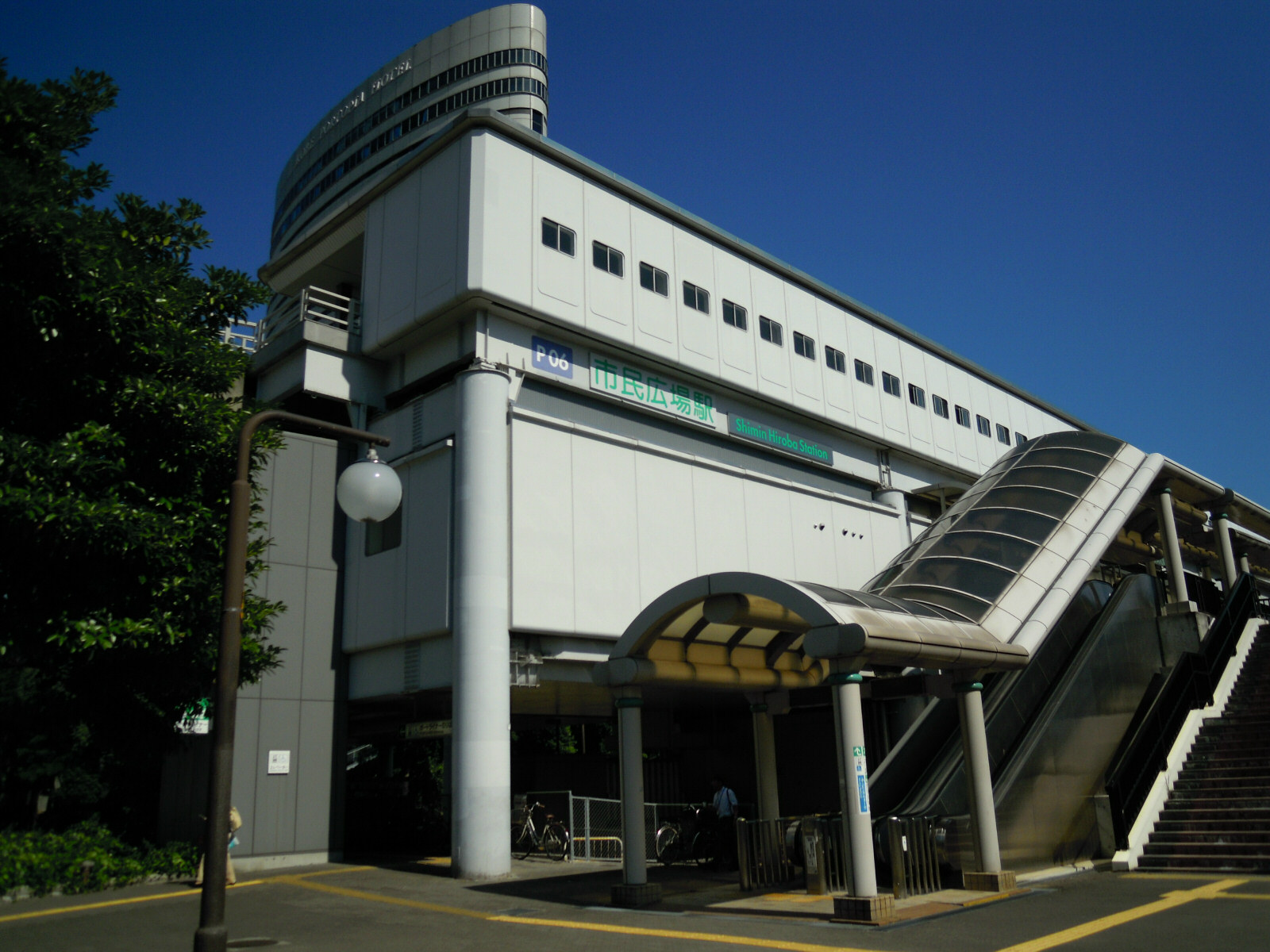
- Station exterior

General information
- Location: Chūō-ku, Kobe; Japan
- Coordinates: 34°39′53.64″N 135°12′44.86″E
- Operator: Kobe New Transit
- Line: Port Island Line
- Distance: 3.8 km from Sannomiya
- Platforms: 2 side platforms

Construction
- Structure type: Elevated

Other information
- Station code: P06

History
- Opened: February 5, 1981

Passengers
- 14,880 per day (2017)
Location

Shimin Hiroba Station (市民広場駅, Shimin Hiroba Eki) is a railway station operated by Kobe New Transit in Chūō-ku, Kobe, Japan. It is located on Port Island and is served by the Port Island Line. The station is alternatively known as Convention Center Station (コンベンションセンター駅).

== Ridership ==
Ridership per day
| Year | Ridership |
|---|---|
| 2011 | 12,100 |
| 2012 | 12,929 |
| 2013 | 13,317 |
| 2014 | 13,617 |
| 2015 | 14,864 |
| 2016 | 14,930 |
| 2017 | 14,880 |

== Gallery ==
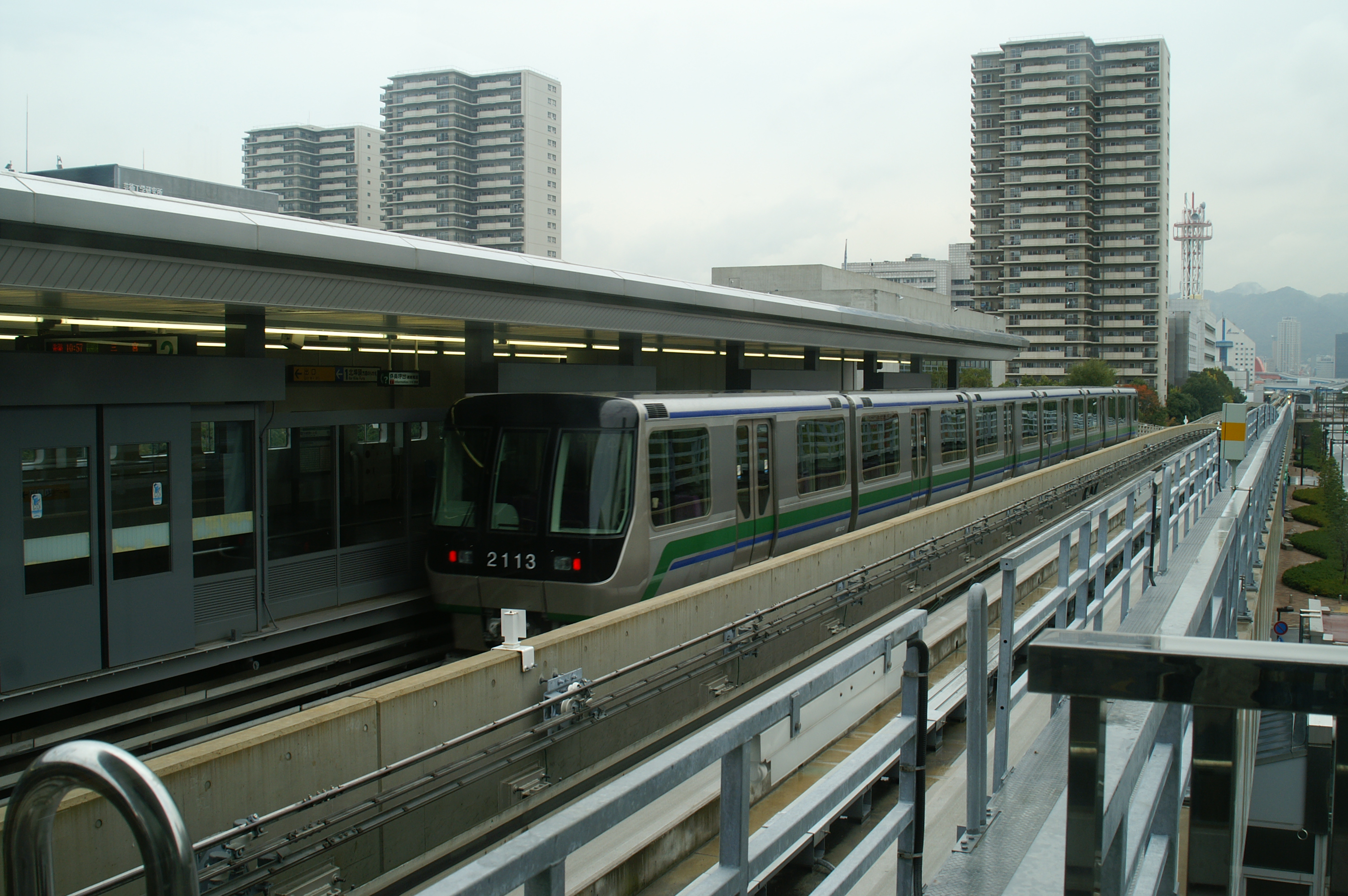
A Kobe New Transit 2000 series at Shimin Hiroba

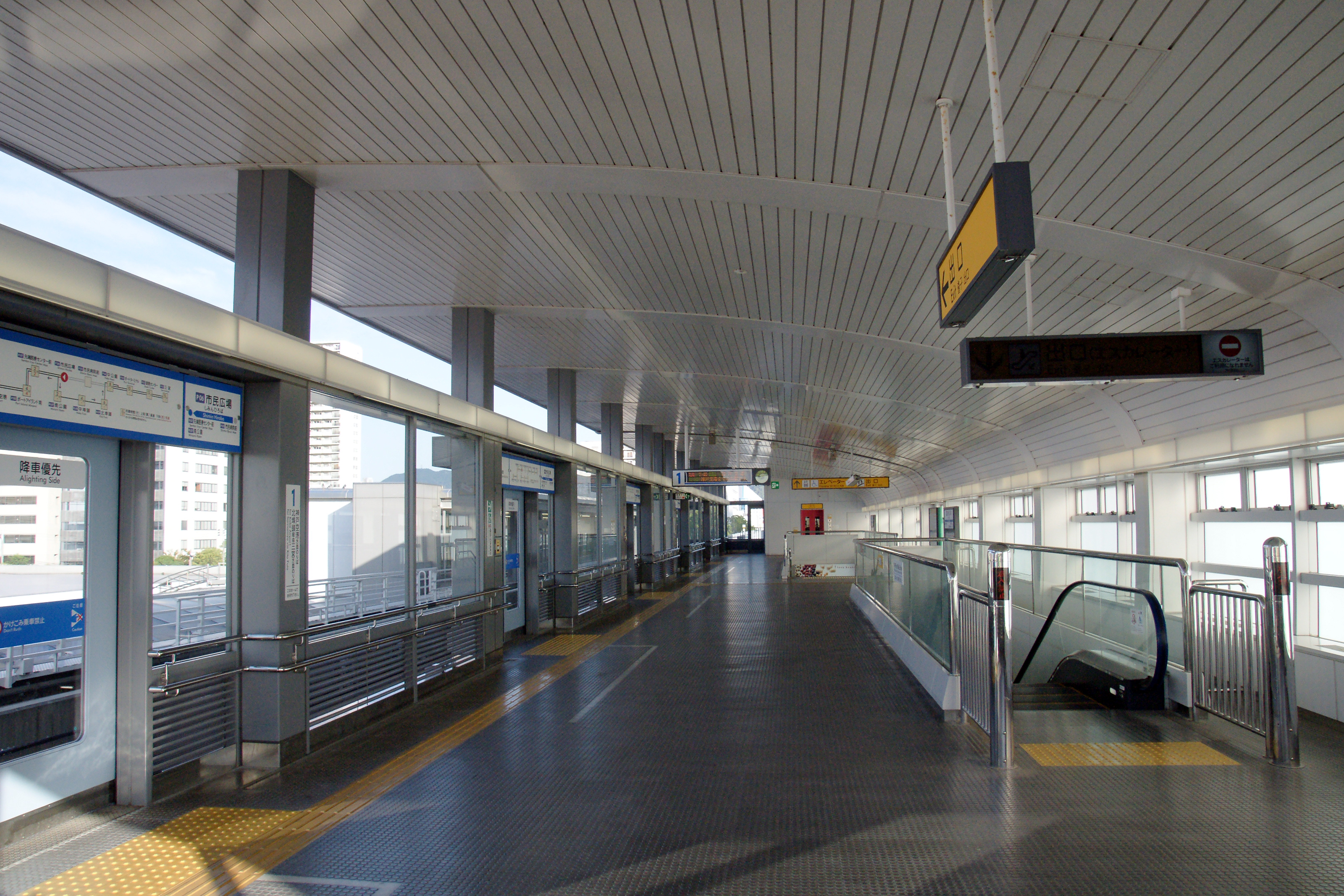
Platform 1

== Surrounding area ==
The surrounding area consists of the Kobe Exhibition hall complex. Among these facilities is the World Memorial Hall.

== Adjacent stations ==
| « | Service | » |
Main line (Sannomiya–Kobe Airport)
| Minatojima | - | Iryo Center |
Loop line (one-way only)
| Minatojima | To Naka Futo | Minami Koen |
