= Naka Koen Station =

Railway station in Kobe, Japan

Naka Koen Station 中公園駅
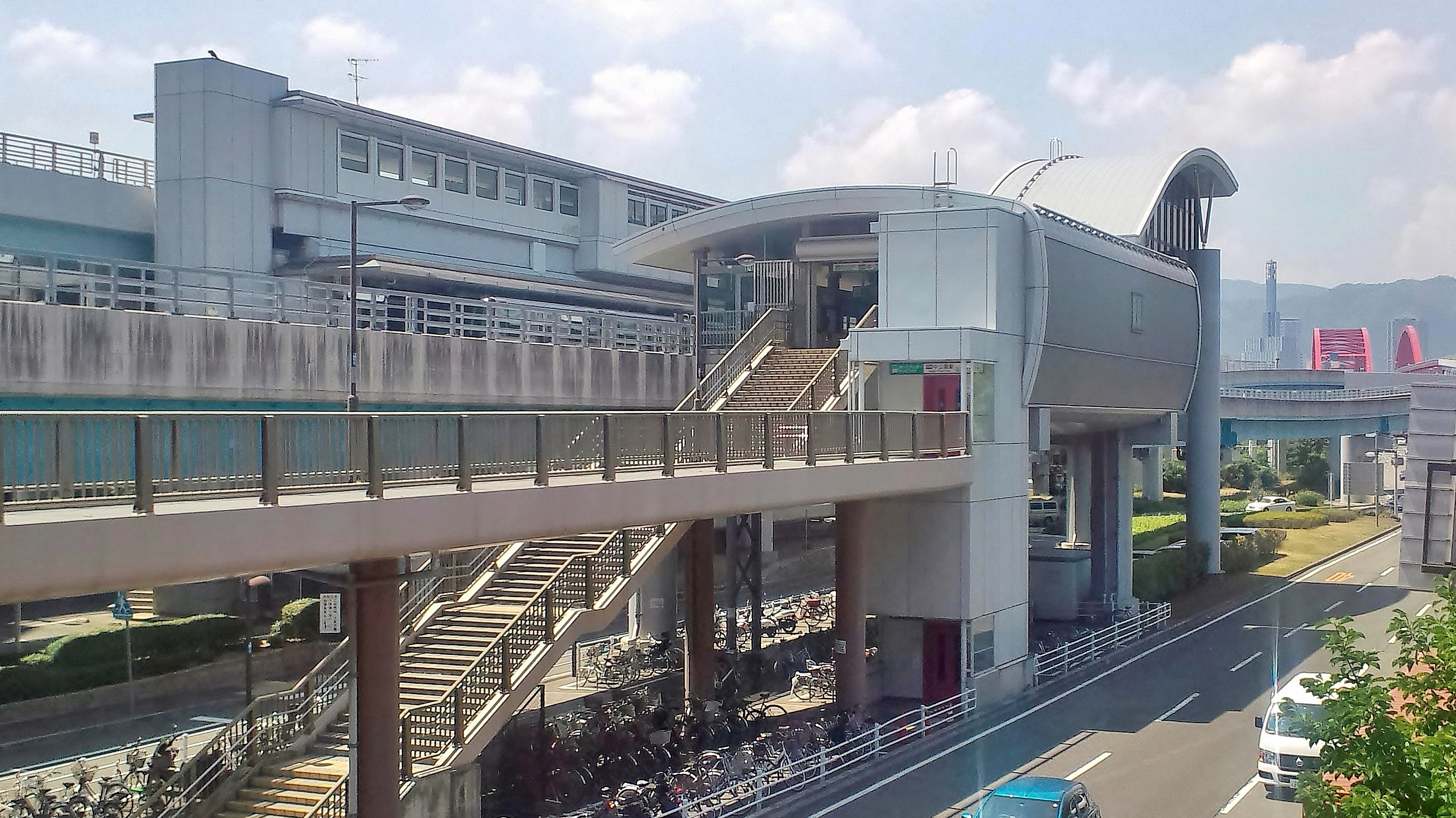
- Station exterior

General information
- Location: Chūō-ku, Kobe; Japan
- Coordinates: 34°40′23.70″N 135°12′26.62″E
- Operator: Kobe New Transit
- Line: Port Island Line
- Distance: 2.8 km from Sannomiya
- Platforms: 3 side platforms

Construction
- Structure type: Elevated

Other information
- Station code: P04

History
- Opened: February 5, 1981

Passengers
- 8,004 per day (2017)
Location

Naka Koen (中公園駅, Naka Kōen Eki) is a railway station operated by Kobe New Transit in Chūō-ku, Kobe, Japan. It is located on Port Island and is served by the Port Island Line.

== Ridership ==
Ridership per day
Year	Ridership
2011	7,500
2012	7,617
2013	7,511
2014	7,393
2015	7,765
2016	8,120
2017	8,004

== Gallery ==
Station entrance

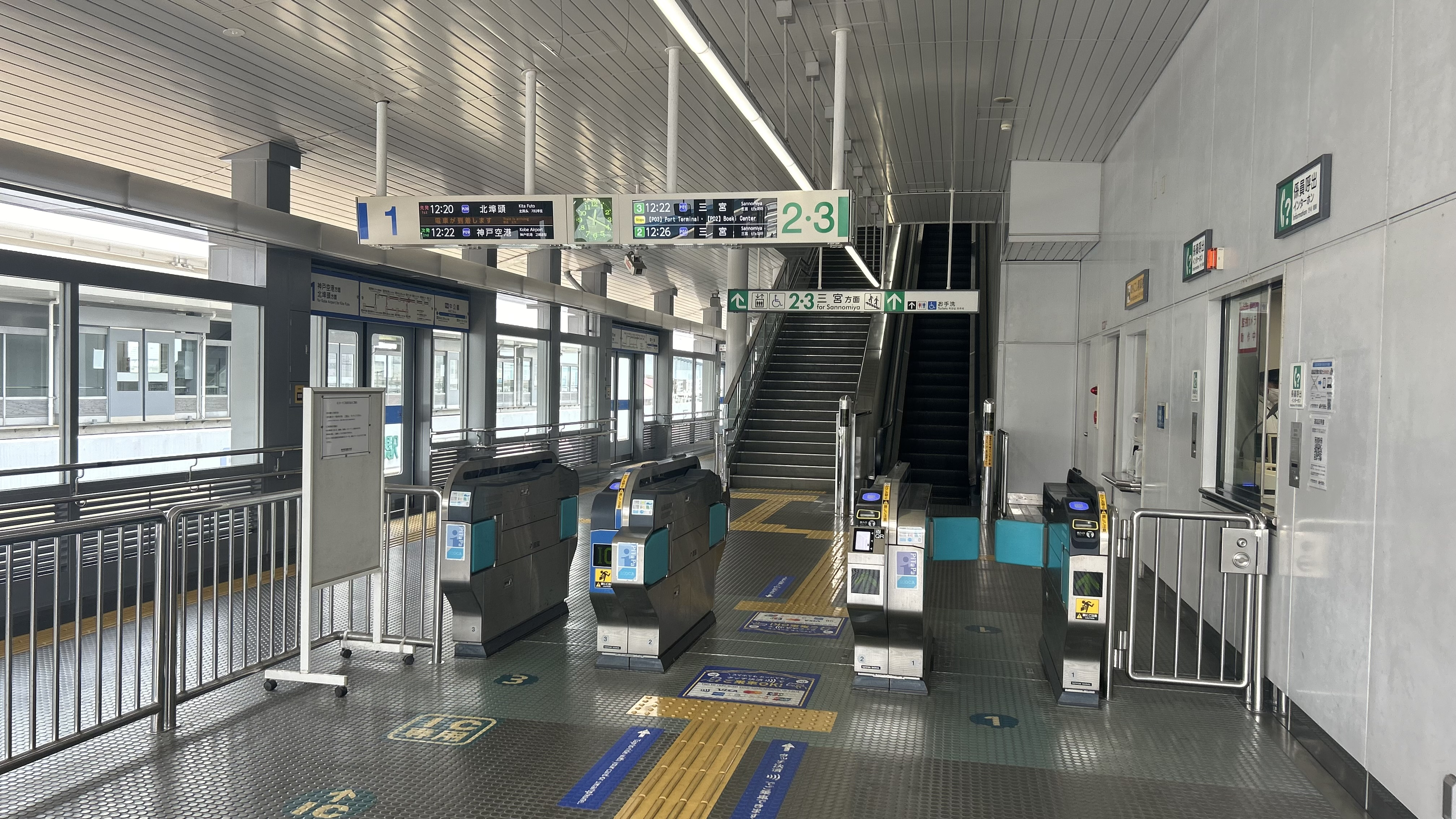
Station interior

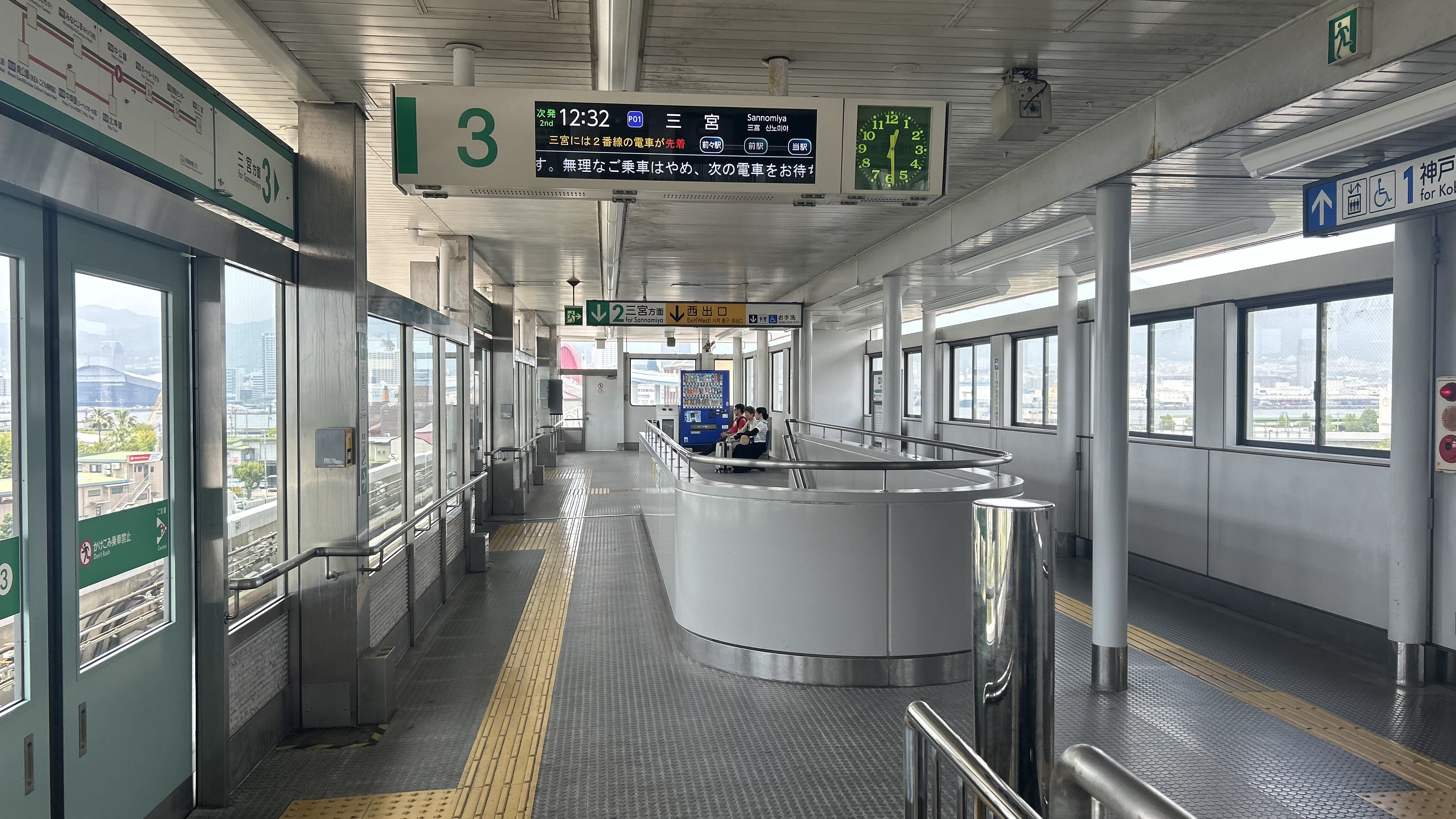
Station platform

== Adjacent stations ==
«	Service	»
Main line (Sannomiya–Kobe Airport)
Port Terminal	-	Minatojima
Loop line (one-way only)
Port Terminal	To Naka Futo	Minatojima
Kita Futo	To Sannomiya	Port Terminal
