= Osaka Airport =

Osaka Airport may refer to one of the following airports serving Osaka, Japan:

- Itami Airport, the domestic, and former international hub (IATA: ITM).
- Kansai International Airport, the international hub since September 1994, which also serves some domestic flights (IATA: KIX).
- Kobe Airport, (IATA: UKB).
