= Port Terminal Station =

Railway station in Kobe, Japan

Port Terminal Station ポートターミナル駅
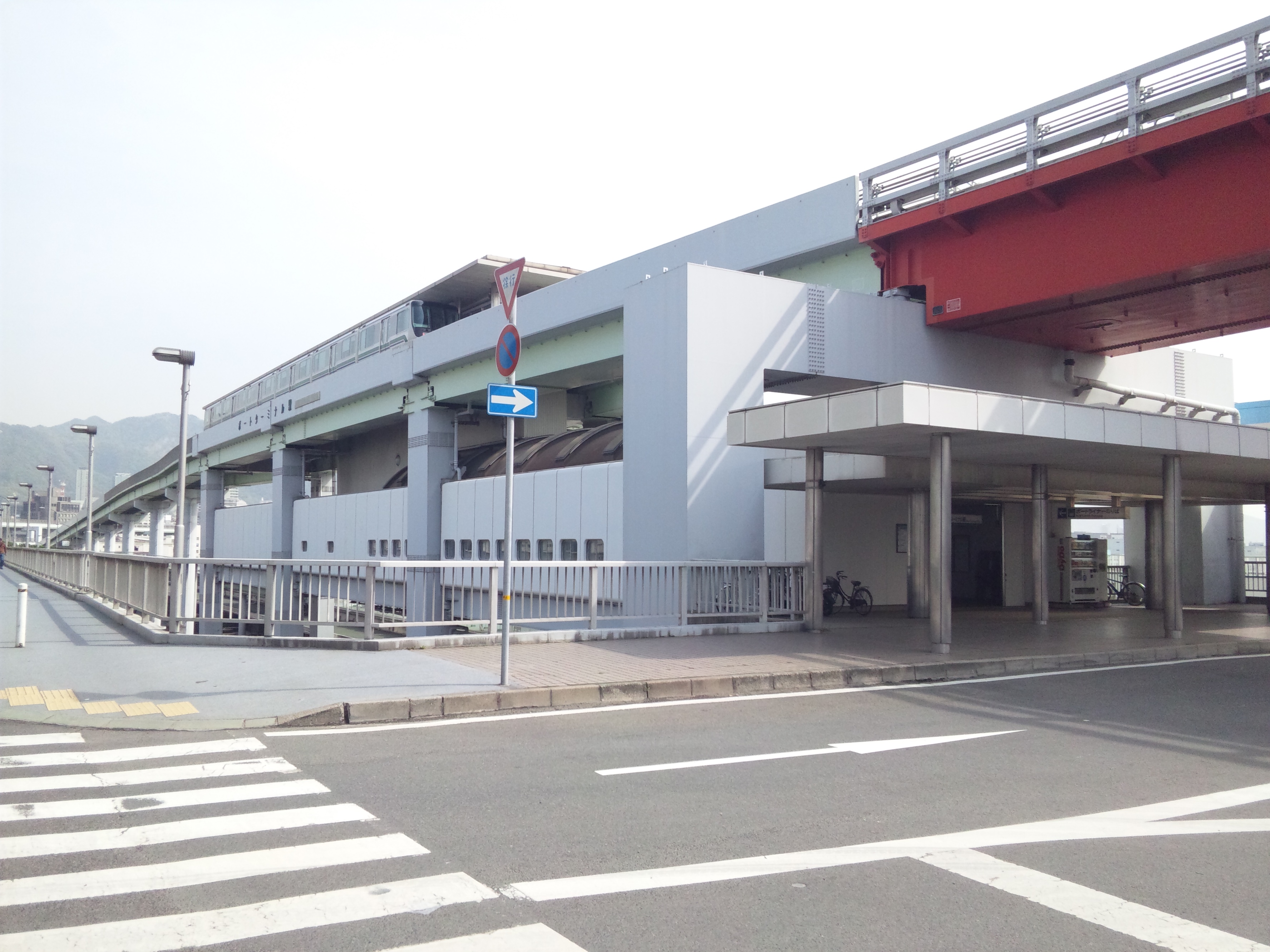
- Station entrance

General information
- Location: Chūō-ku, Kobe; Japan
- Coordinates: 34°40′52.99″N 135°12′8.29″E
- Operator: Kobe New Transit
- Line: Port Island Line
- Distance: 1.8 km from Sannomiya
- Platforms: 1 island platform

Construction
- Structure type: Elevated

Other information
- Station code: P03

History
- Opened: February 5, 1981

Passengers
- 879 per day (2017)
Location

Port Terminal Station (ポートターミナル駅, Pōto Tāminaru Eki) is a railway station operated by Kobe New Transit in Chūō-ku, Kobe, Japan. It is on the Port Island Line. The station serves the passenger terminal of the Port of Kobe, which is used by international ferry lines and cruise ships.

== Ridership ==
Ridership per day
Year	Ridership
2011	500
2012	574
2013	629
2014	705
2015	656
2016	890
2017	879

== Adjacent stations ==
«	Service	»
Main line (Sannomiya–Kobe Airport)
Boeki Center	-	Naka Koen
Loop line
Boeki Center	-	Naka Koen
