= UKB =

UKB may stand for:

- IATA airport code of Kobe Airport
- United Keetoowah Band of Cherokee Indians
- United Kingdom of Britain, an erroneous short name for the United Kingdom of Great Britain and Northern Ireland
