= Kobe Airport Station =

Railway station in Kobe, Hyogo prefecture, Japan

Kobe Airport Station 神戸空港駅
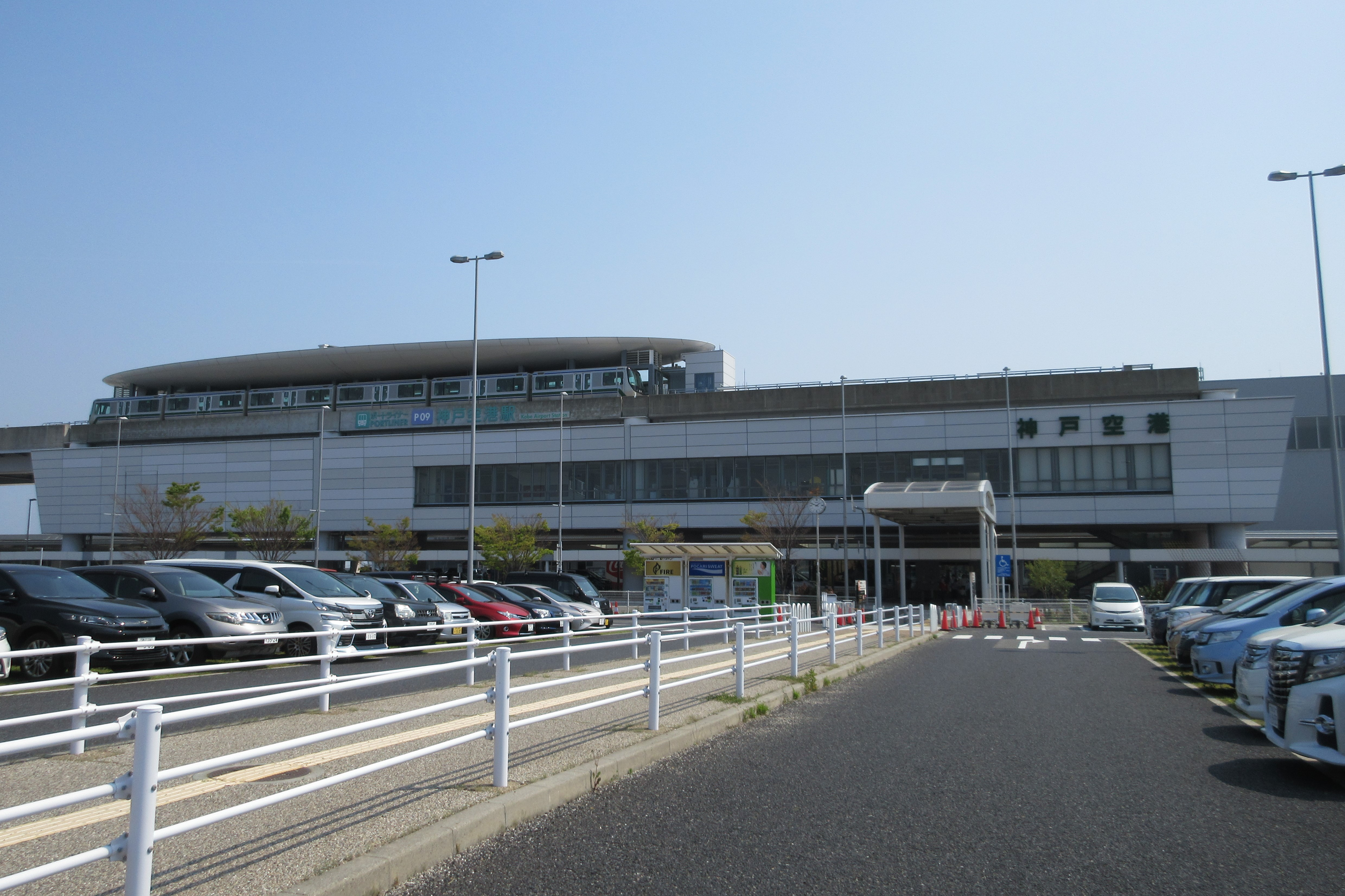

General information
- Location: Kobe Kūkō, Chūō-ku, Kobe-shi, Hyōgo-ken; Japan
- Coordinates: 34.6372°N 135.2290°E
- Operator: Kobe New Transit
- Line: Port Island Line
- Platforms: 1 island platform
- Tracks: 2

Other information
- Station code: P09

History
- Opened: 2 February 2006
Location
- Location within Japan

Kobe Airport Station (神戸空港駅, Kobe Kūkō eki) is a railway station on the Port Island Line in Kobe, Hyōgo Prefecture, Japan, operated by Kobe New Transit.

== Lines ==
Kobe Airport Station is served by the Port Island Line automated guideway transit.

== Station layout ==
Kobe Airport Station has a single island platform.

=== Platforms ===
1-2	■ Port Island Line	for Kobe-Sannomiya

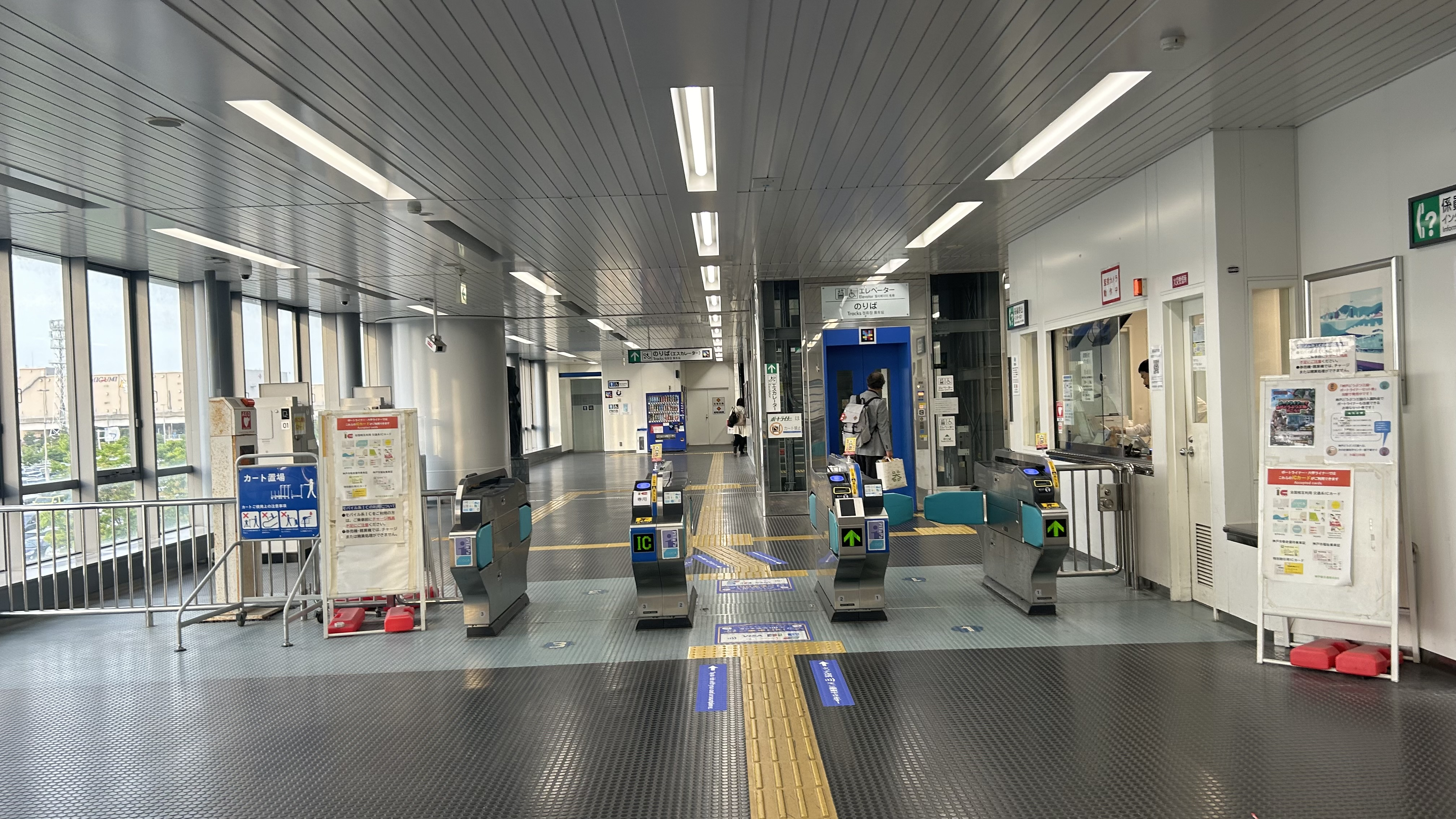
The ticket gate

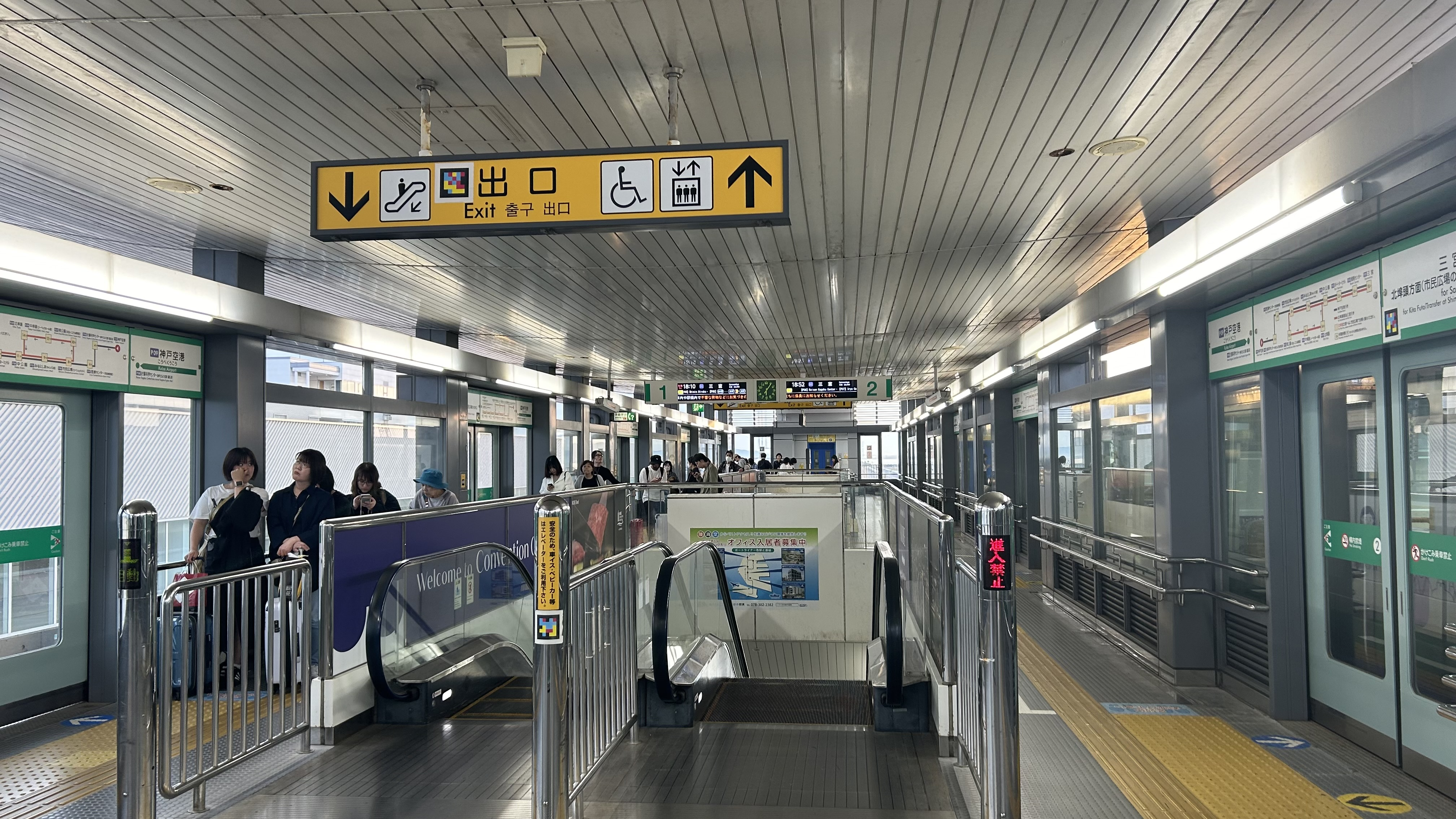
The train platform

== Adjacent stations ==
«	Service	»
Port Island Line (P09)
Keisan Kagaku Center (P08)	-	Terminus

== History ==
Kobe Airport Station opened on February 2, 2006.

== See also ==
- Kobe Airport
