= Nakafutō Station =

Nakafutō Station is the name of two train stations in Japan:

- Nakafutō Station (Hyōgo) (中埠頭駅)
- Nakafutō Station (Osaka) (中ふ頭駅)
