= Minami Kōen Station =

Railway station in Kobe, Hyogo prefecture, Japan

Coordinates: 34°39′52.66″N 135°13′1.10″E

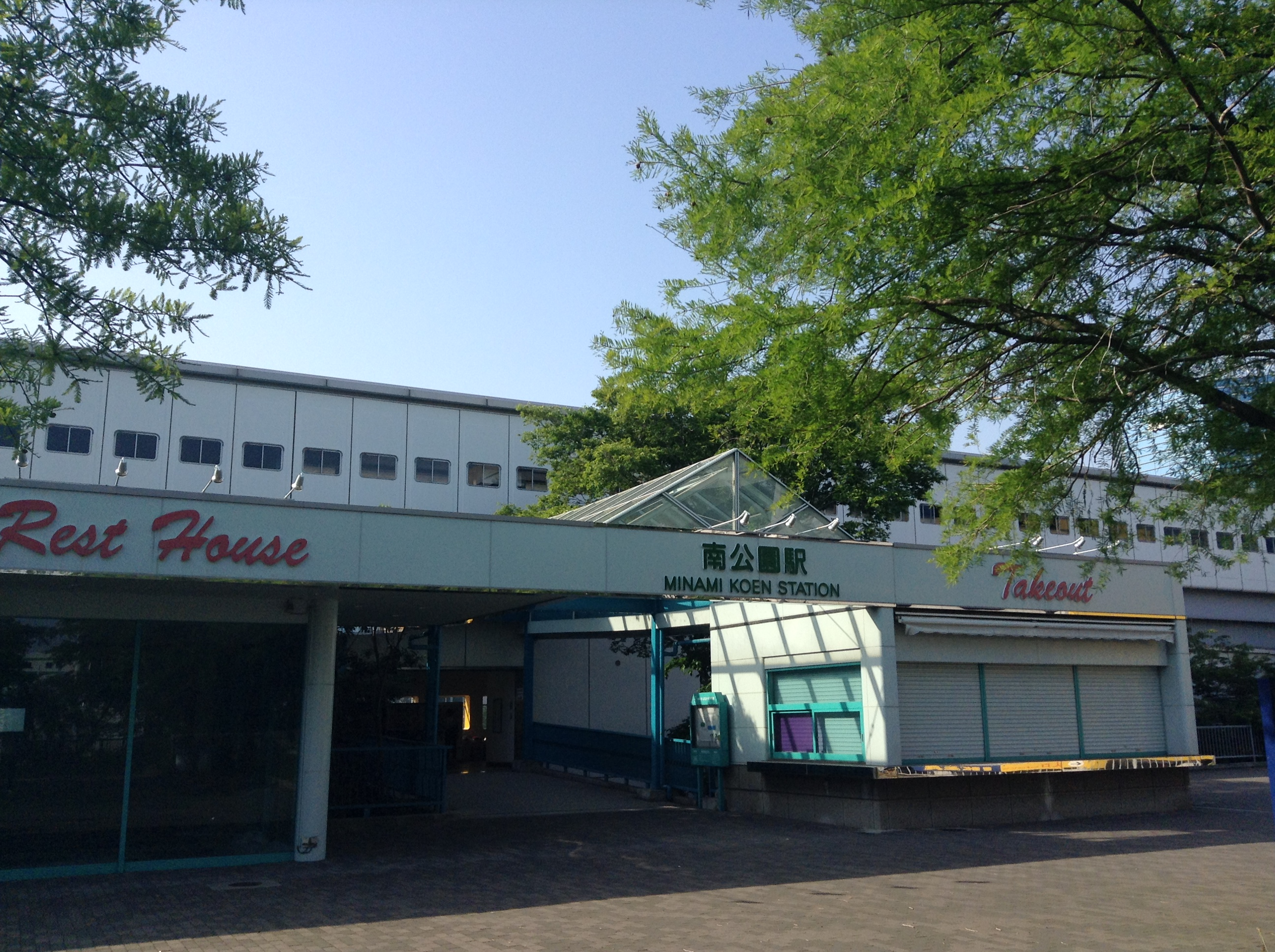
Minami Koen station 2014

Minami Kōen Station (南公園駅) is a railway station located in the Chuo Ward of Kobe. It is located on the Port Liner in Chūō-ku, Kobe, Japan. Minami Kōen directly translates to South Park in English. The station has also the nickname IKEA-mae (IKEA前) as it's close to an IKEA store.

The station has only one track as it's on the loop section of Port Liner with one-way traffic only.

== Stations next to Minami Kōen ==
Portliner
Local (普通)

Shimin-Hiroba (P06) → Minami Kōen (PL07) → Naka Futō (PL08)
