= Port Island Line =

Transit system in Kobe, Japan

Port Liner
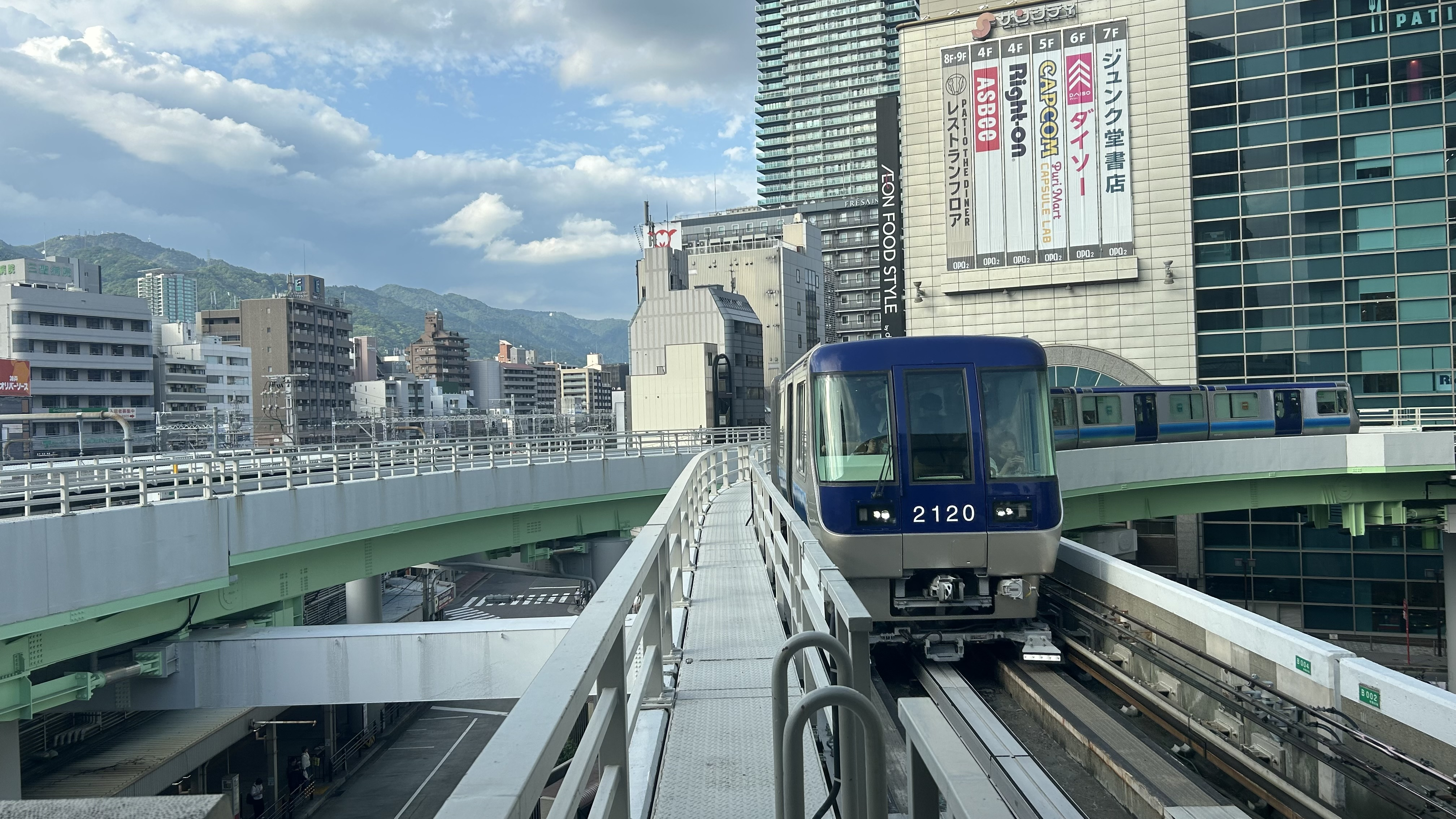
- Kobe New Transit 2020 series

Overview
- Owner: Kobe New Transit
- Locale: Kobe
- Termini: Sannomiya; Kobe Airport
- Stations: 12

Service
- Type: Automated guideway transit
- Rolling stock: 2000 series, 2020 series

History
- Opened: February 5, 1981

Technical
- Line length: 10.8 km (6.71 mi)
- Electrification: Conductor rails, 600 V 50 Hz 3φ AC
Route map
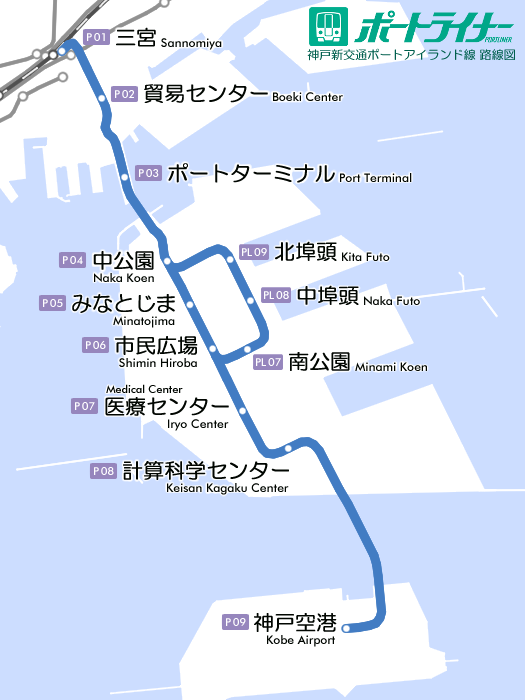

The Port Island Line (ポートアイランド線, Pōtoairando-sen), commonly known as Port Liner (ポートライナー, Pōtorainā) is an urban automated guideway transit (AGT) system in Kobe, Japan, operated by Kobe New Transit.

The initial system linked Sannomiya Station, Kobe's main transit hub, to the man-made Port Island, covering a distance of 6.4 km (4.0 mi) with 9 stations.

== Route ==
As the map indicates, the present system consists of one straight line, originating at Sannomiya Station and terminating at Kobe Airport Station, and a loop attached to the middle of the straight line. The stations on the former are numbered with prefix "P" and on the latter (except those shared with the former) are with prefix "PL".

The main section between Sannomiya and the airport is entirely double track, but the remaining of the loop has not been rebuilt so that the three stations with PL prefix still serve only one way.

== Stations ==
All stations are located in Chūō-ku, Kobe.

Station			km	Transfers
Double track section
P01	Sannomiya	三宮	0.0	Hankyu Kōbe Main Line/Kobe Kosoku Line (Kobe-Sannomiya Station, HK16); Hanshin Electric Railway Main Line (Kobe-Sannomiya, HS32); Kobe Municipal Subway Seishin-Yamate Line (Sannomiya, S03); Kobe Municipal Subway Kaigan Line (Sannomiya-Hanadokeimae Station, K01); JR West JR Kobe Line (Sannomiya, JR-A61)
P02	Bōeki Center	貿易センター	0.8	
P03	Port Terminal	ポートターミナル	1.8	
P04	Naka Kōen	中公園	2.8	for Naka-Futo
P05	Minatojima	みなとじま	3.3	
P06	Shimin Hiroba	市民広場	3.8	for Naka-Futo (through service to Sannomiya)
P07	Iryō Center	医療センター	4.6	
P08	Keisan Kagaku Center	計算科学センター	5.4	
P09	Kobe Airport	神戸空港	8.2	
Single Track Section
P06	Shimin-Hiroba	市民広場	0.0	for Kobe Airport/Sannomiya
PL07	Minami Kōen	南公園	0.6	
PL08	Naka Futō	中埠頭	1.2	
PL09	Kita Futō	北埠頭	1.7	
P04	Naka-Kōen	中公園	2.6	for Kobe Airport/Sannomiya (through service)

== History ==
Opened in 1981, the Port Liner was the world's first driverless urban transit system, more than two years ahead of the VAL system used on the Lille Metro, which opened in 1983.

Originally, before the 2006 extension to the airport, the loop section was single track and operated only counter-clockwise trains.

On 2 February 2006, the line was extended by 4.3 km (2.7 mi) to the new Kobe Airport, built on an artificial island near Port Island.

In an announcement in 2018, a proposal was made to extend the Port Island Line to 8-car operation following an increase in ridership.

Minatojima Station, Iryō Center Station and K Computer Mae Stations were renamed on July 1, 2011, from Shimin Byōin Mae Station, Sentan Iryō Center Mae Station and Port Island Minami Station respectively. Following the decommissioning of K computer, K Computer Mae station was again renamed as Keisan Kagaku Center station in June 2021.

== Rolling stock ==
- Kobe New Transit 2000/2020 series (since 2006)
- Kobe New Transit 8000 series (from 1981 until 2009)

== See also ==
- Rokkō Island Line
- Airport rail link
