= Kobe New Transit 2000 series =

Japanese train type

Kobe New Transit 2000 and 2020 series
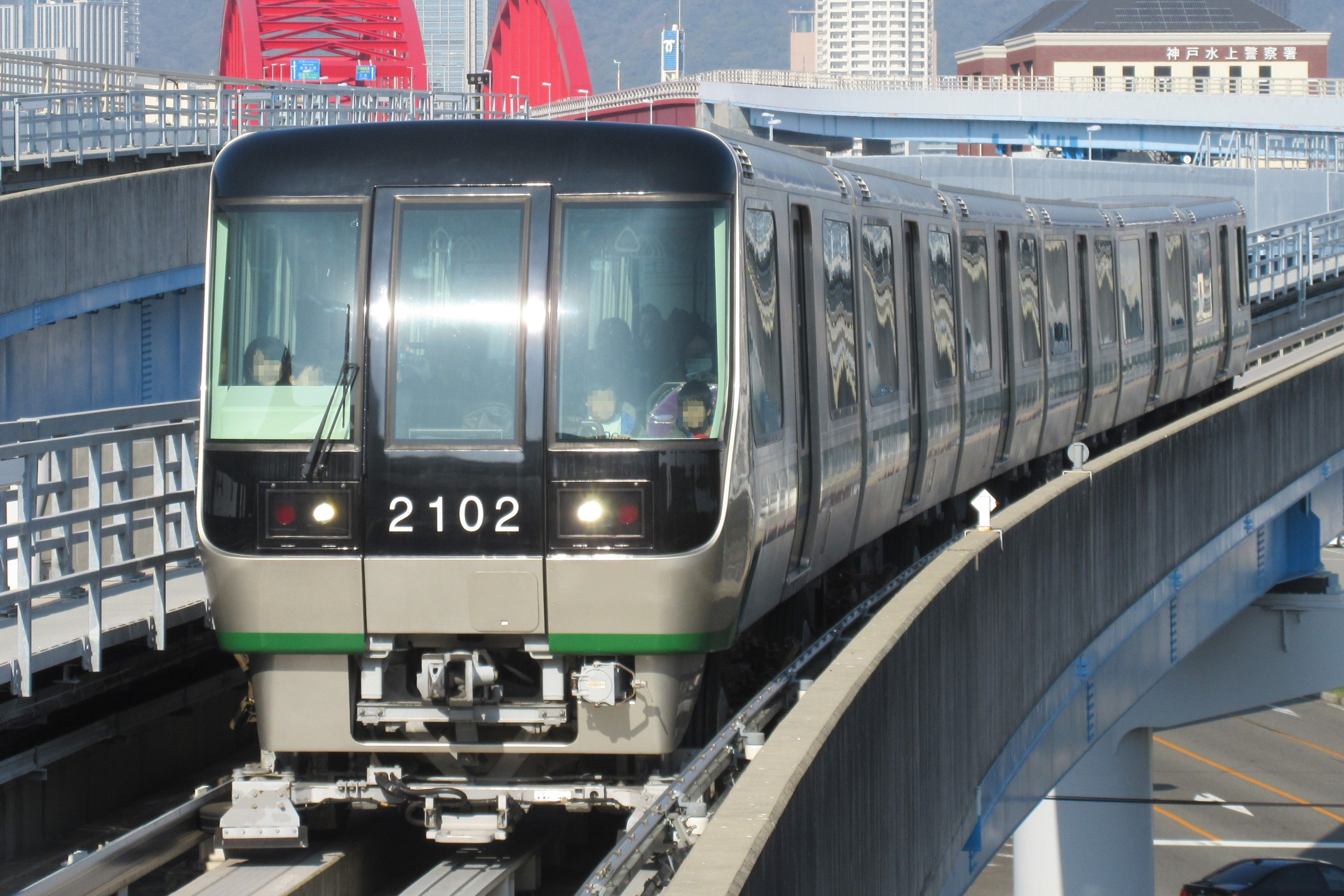
- 2000 series train on the Port Island Line
- In service: 2006 - Present
- Manufacturer: Kawasaki Heavy Industries
- Replaced: Kobe New Transit 8000 series
- Constructed: 2005 - 2009, 2015
- Entered service: 2 February 2006
- Number built: 114 vehicles (19 sets)
- Formation: 6 cars per trainset
- Fleet numbers: 2x01–2x17, 2x20, 2x21
- Operators: Kobe New Transit
- Lines served: Port Island Line

Specifications
- Car body construction: Stainless steel
- Train length: 50.4 m (165 ft 4 in)
- Car length: 8.4 m (27 ft 7 in)
- Width: 2,492 mm (8 ft 2.1 in)
- Height: 3.27 m (10 ft 9 in)
- Maximum speed: 60 km/h (37 mph)
- Traction system: PWM 3-level IGBT–VVVF
- Traction motors: 6 × 110 kW (148 hp) self-ventilated 3-phase AC induction motor
- Power output: 660 kW (885 hp)
- Acceleration: 0.97 m/s^{2} (2.2 mph/s)
- Deceleration: 0.97 m/s^{2} (2.2 mph/s) (service); 1.3 m/s^{2} (2.9 mph/s) (emergency)
- Electric system(s): 600 V 60 Hz 3-phase AC third rail
- Braking system(s): Regenerative brake, electronically controlled pneumatic brakes
- Safety system(s): ATC/ATO
- Track gauge: 1,740 mm (5 ft 9 in)

The Kobe New Transit 2000 series (神戸新交通2000型) is an automated guideway transit (AGT) vehicle used for passenger service on the Port Island Line (Port Liner) of the Kobe New Transit. The trains were introduced on February 2, 2006, to coincide with the extension of the Port Island Line to the newly opened Kobe Airport. The series is a successor to the 8000 series trains that ran on Port Liner from the line's opening in 1981 until November 2009.

== Background ==
Introduced on February 2, 2006, simultaneously with the extension of the Port Liner to Kobe Airport, the 2000 series is based on the Kawasaki Computer Control Vehicle (KCV) developed by Kawasaki Heavy Industries, the same company that manufactures the 8000 series rolling stock used for the Port Liner since service began. Therefore, it has guide wheels for floating switches installed on both sides of the cars. 2000 series and 8000 series are the only New Transit System rolling stock to handle this type. Since the last of the ageing 8000 series trains were withdrawn in 2009, additional 2000 series rolling stock may be manufactured in the future. Formation numbers are 13 through 15.

== Physical design ==
The exterior of the 2000 series is different from the 8000 series with the unpainted stainless steel body wrapped by lines in the corporate colors, green and blue. The logo mark next to the doors on the 8000 series is not present. The carriage has been changed to the same core-type pneumatic rubber tires used on the 1000 series. The interior is also different from the 8000 series with warm-colored box seats in a 2+1 arrangement. It is also equipped with overhead baggage racks and blinds. As in the 8000 series there is piping on the ceiling above the entry/exit doors to substitute for hand straps, but its shape is different. The communications device has been changed to intercom-form.

== Barrier-free (accessibility) conversion ==
Manufactured in accordance with the Transportation Accessibility Law, the 2000 series has from its beginning had wheelchair spaces and over-door LED information displays to indicate on which side the doors will open with multi-lingual support. 8000 series rolling stock was remodeled to include these features also. The intercom and emergency stop button were also moved close to the wheelchair space and their height adjusted to be usable from a wheelchair. Car body interior space was enlarged (by removing the baggage areas found in the 8000 series), and the elevation difference between platform and entry/exit doors reduced.
