= Portopia '81 =

Japanese exposition

Portopia '81 (Japanese: 神戸ポートアイランド博覧会), also abbreviated "Portopia", was an exhibition in Japan held at Port Island and March 20 - September 15, 1981.

Its theme was "Creation of a New Cultural City on the Sea". Portopia was organized to commemorate the opening of Port Island. It was visited by over 16 million people.

== Pavilions ==
- Theme Pavilion
- Hyogo Prefecture Pavilion
- Kobe Pavilion
- Kawasaki Steel Earth Pavilion
- Kobe Steel Portorama Pavilion
- Suntory Water Land
- Midori Pavilion - Sanwa Group.
- Kobe Planetarium Theater
- Daiei Pavilion Omnimax Theater
- Sumitomo Pavilion
- Mitsubishi Pavilion
- IBM Kentoshi Pavilion
- Sanyo Solarium
- KEPCO Future Energy Pavilion
- Osaka Gas Wonderland
- UCC Coffee Pavilion
- Fuyo Group Pavilion Green Air Dome
- Heartpia
- Mitsui Group Pavilion
- Solar Pyramid Matsushita Pavilion
- Fresh Life '81
- Fashion Live Theater
- Minami Galathee Pavilion
- Tobacco & Salt Paviion - Japan Tobacco and Salt Public Corporation.
- Port Oasis
- Amateur Radio Pavilion - Japan Amateur Radio League.
- International Pavilion No.1
  - United Arab Emirates
  - State of Paraná
  - State of Washington
  - Finland
  - United Nations
- International Pavilion No.2
  - West Germany
  - Bulgaria
  - Rotterdam
  - Marseille
  - Riga
  - UNESCO
  - South Pacific Pavilion - Australia, Solomon Islands, Tuvalu, Tonga, West Samoa, Vanuatu, Papua New Guinea, Fiji, Hawaii, Northern Mariana Islands, Guam, New Caledonia, and French Polynesia shared the same booth.
  - International Communication Pavilion - KDD.
  - EXPO'85
- International Pavilion No.3 - Saudi Ports Authority.
- Large exhibition hall - Using the Kobe International Exhibition Hall.
  - Tianjin Pavilion
  - Telecom Pavilion - NTT.
  - Local Government Pavilion
  - Toban-Yosui Irrigational Canal Pavilion
- International Pavilion No.4
  - Sri Lanka
  - Mexico
  - Limited time booth - Philippines, Thailand, Bhutan, Bolivia, and Chile shared the same booth.
- Indoor Event Venue - Using the Port Island Sports Center.
  - Rokko Flood Control Pavilion
- Panda Pavilion
