= Naka Futo Station =

Railway station in Kobe, Japan

Naka Futo Station 中埠頭駅
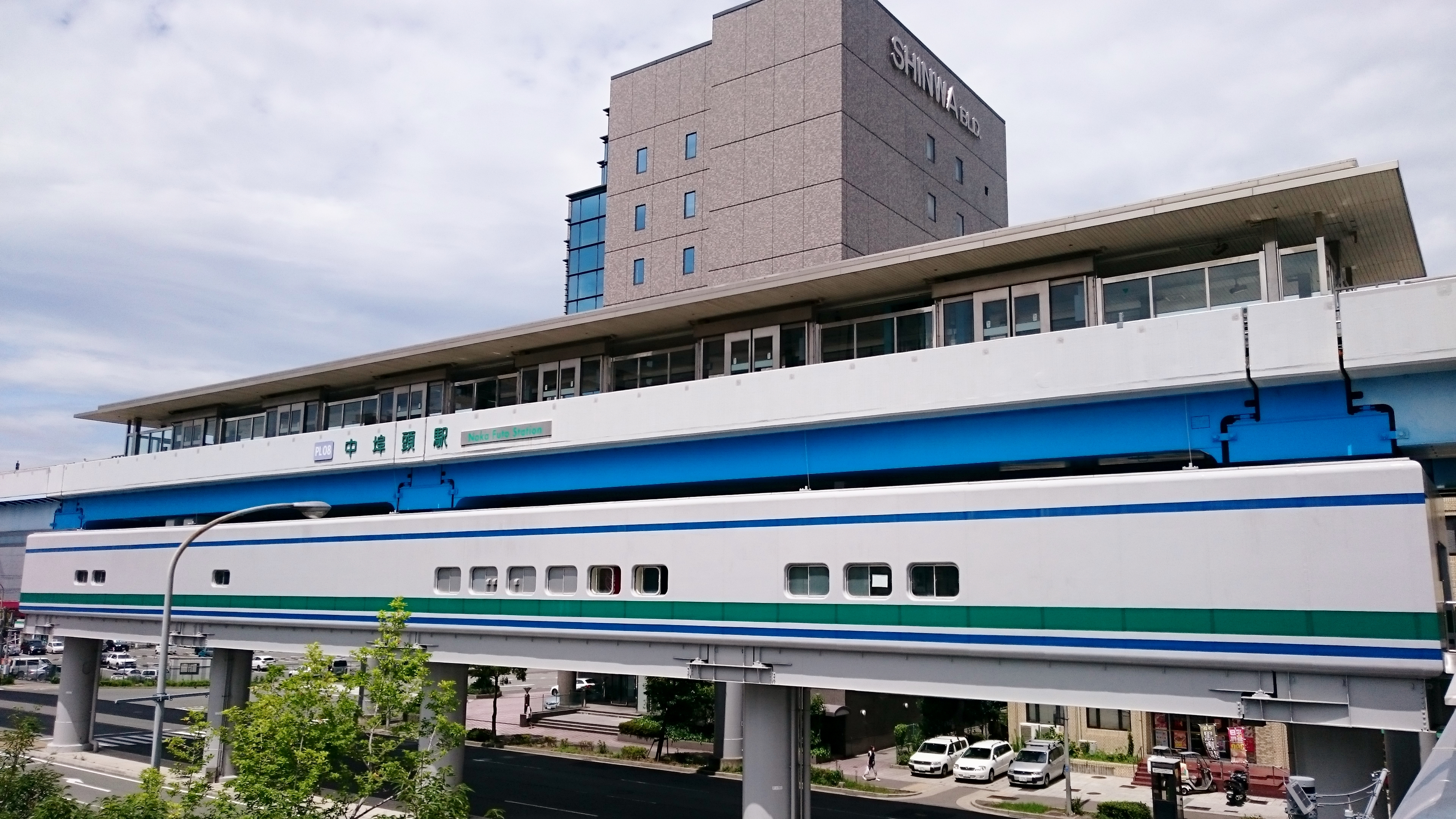
- Station exterior

General information
- Location: Chūō-ku, Kobe; Japan
- Coordinates: 34°40′9.96″N 135°13′1.80″E
- Operator: Kobe New Transit
- Line: Port Island Line
- Distance: 1.2 km from Shimin Hiroba
- Platforms: 1 island platform

Construction
- Structure type: Elevated

Other information
- Station code: PL08

History
- Opened: February 5, 1981

Passengers
- 2,961 per day (2017)
Location

Naka Futo Station (中埠頭駅, Naka Futō Eki) is a railway station operated by Kobe New Transit in Chūō-ku, Kobe, Japan. It is located on Port Island and is served by the loop portion of the Port Island Line, and trains only run northbound towards Sannomiya. The station is alternatively known as XEBEC HALL Station (ジーベックホール駅).

== Ridership ==
Ridership per day
Year	Ridership
2011	3,400
2012	3,519
2013	3,284
2014	3,119
2015	3,173
2016	2,948
2017	2,961

== Gallery ==
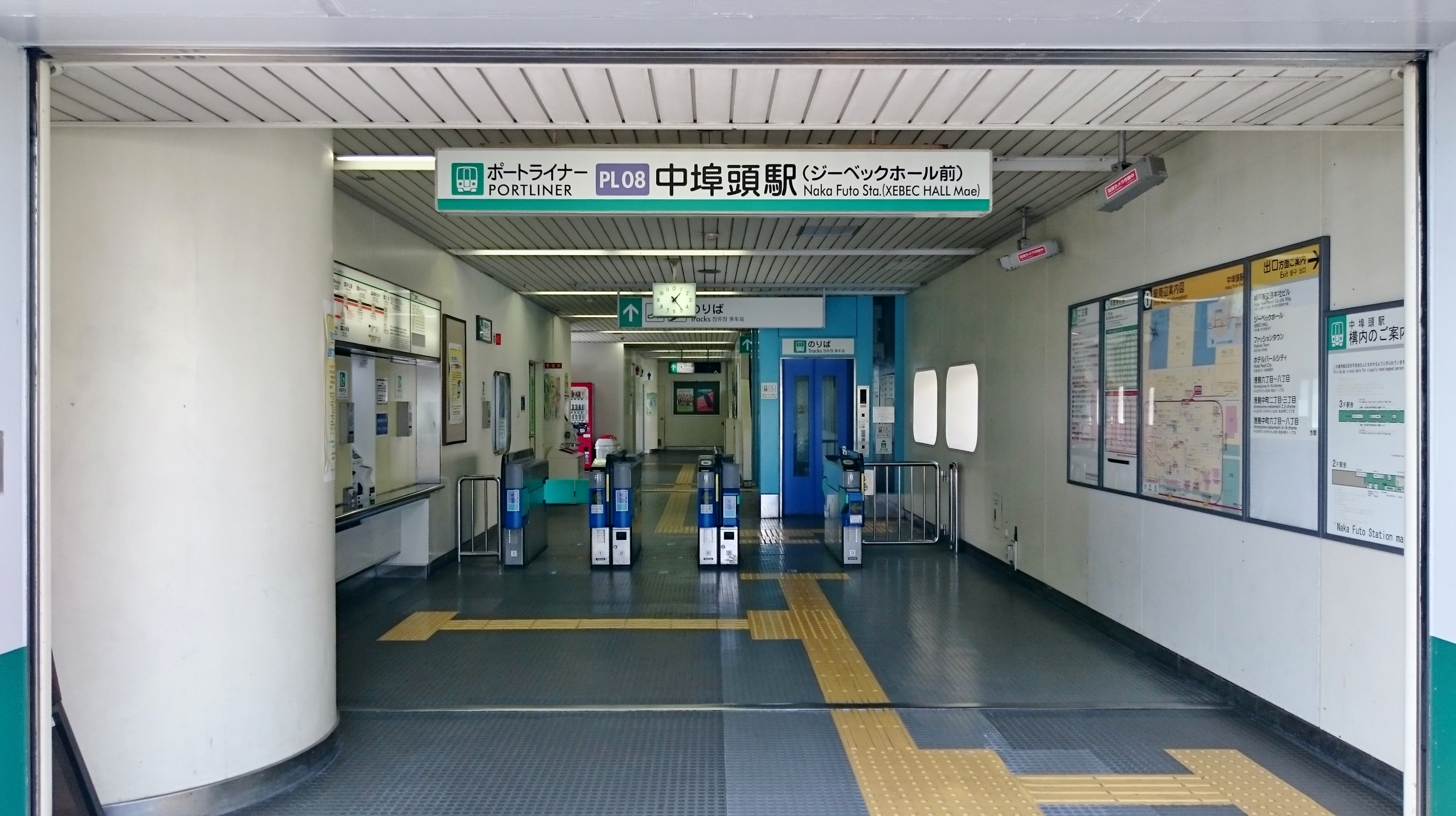
Station entrance

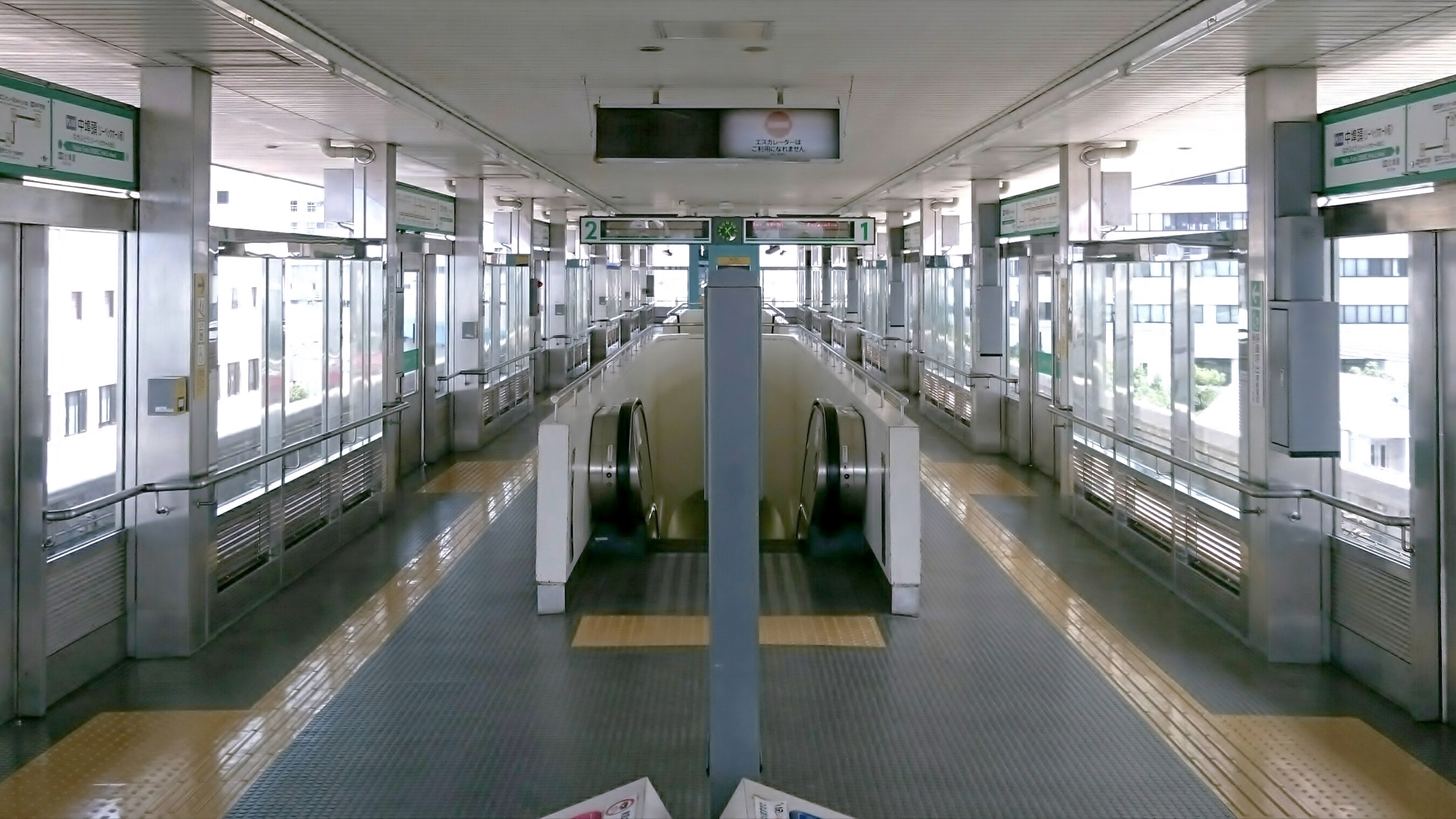
Station platform

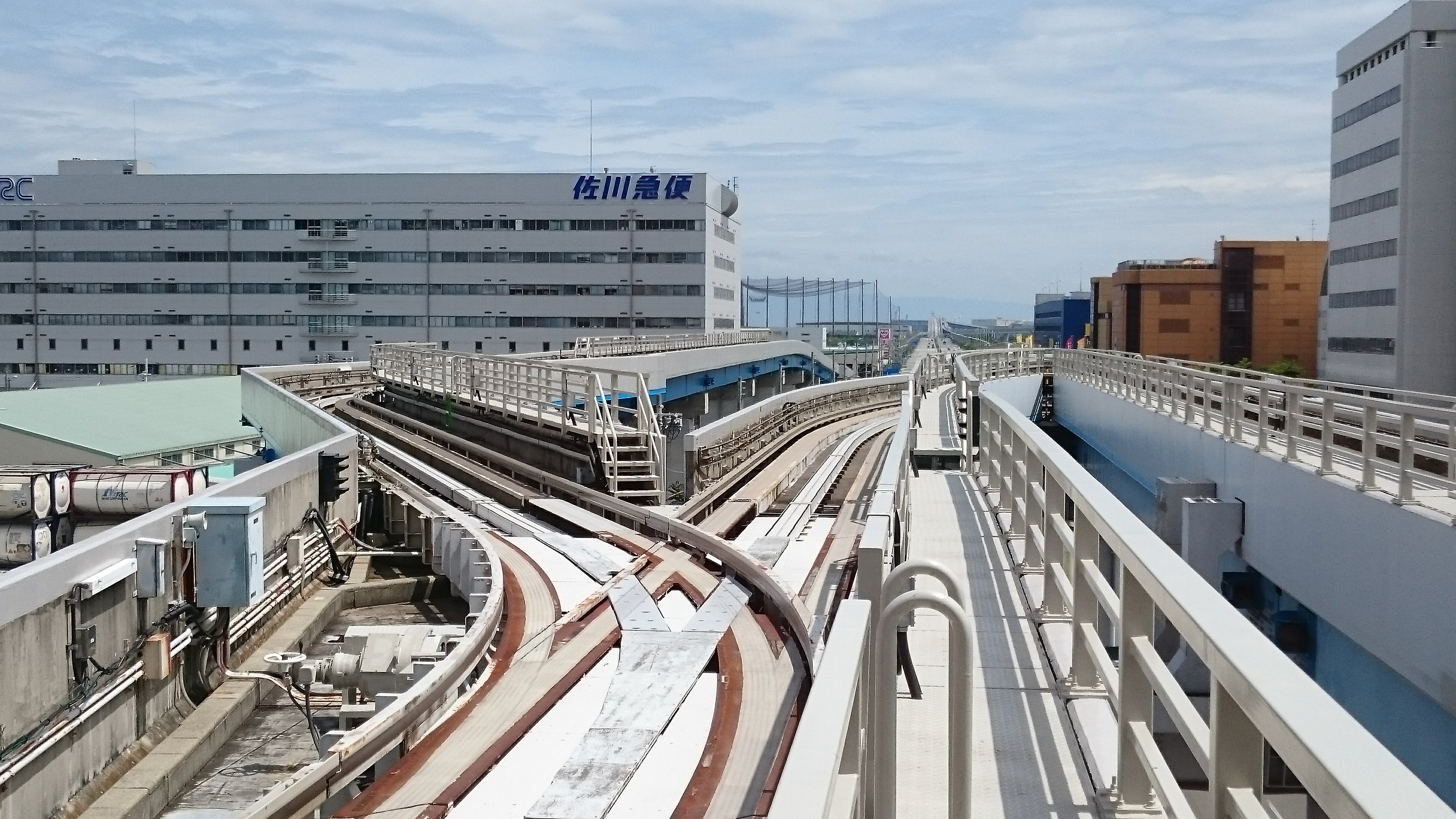
Spur line to the Port Island Line's rail yard to the south

== Adjacent stations ==
«	Service	»
Loop line (northbound only)
Minami Koen	To Sannomiya	Kita Futo
