= Kobe Airport =

Airport in Kobe, Hyōgo Prefecture, Japan

Kobe Airport 神戸空港

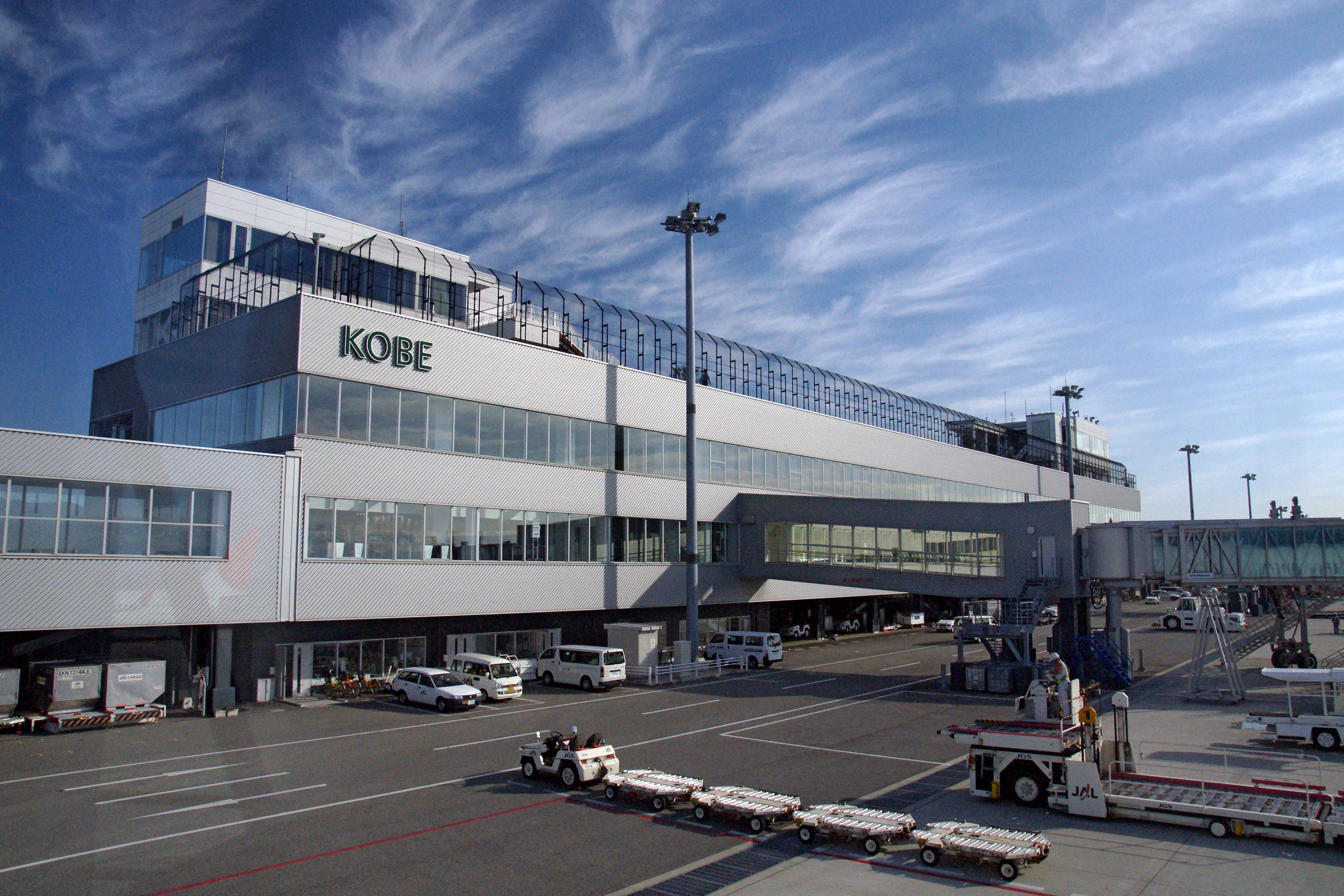
- IATA: UKB; ICAO: RJBE

Summary
- Airport type: Public
- Owner: Kobe City
- Operator: Kansai Airports (Orix-Vinci SA consortium)
- Serves: Keihanshin
- Location: Chūō-ku, Kobe, Hyōgo Prefecture, Japan
- Opened: February 16, 2006; 20 years ago
- Operating base for: Fuji Dream Airlines; Skymark Airlines
- Elevation AMSL: 22 ft (6.7 m)
- Coordinates: 34°37′58″N 135°13′26″E
- Website: www.kairport.co.jp/eng/

Map
- Location in Kobe Location in Hyōgo Prefecture Location in Japan

Runways
Direction	Length		Surface
Direction	m	ft	Surface
09/27	2,500	8,202	Asphalt concrete

Statistics (2024)
- Passengers (Calendar year): 3,576,118
- Cargo (metric tonnes): N/A
- Aircraft movement: 33,300
- Source: Japanese Ministry of Land, Infrastructure, Transport and Tourism

Kobe Airport (神戸空港, Kōbe Kūkō) (IATA: UKB, ICAO: RJBE) is a primarily domestic airport on an artificial island just off the coast of Kobe, 8 km (5.0 mi) south of Sannomiya Station, Japan. Opened on February 16, 2006, it primarily handles domestic flights. International flights to destinations within China, South Korea and Taiwan, started in April 2025. The airport can also accommodate international charter flights. In the first year of operation (2006), the airport handled 2,697,000 passengers with an average load factor of 61.1%. In 2017, it handled 3,071,974 passengers with an average load factor of 79.4%. In the fiscal year covering April 2022 to March 2023, UKB had a passenger throughput of 3,109,151. The island airport covers just 156 hectares (385 acres) of land.

== History ==
The city government of Kobe first proposed an airport adjacent to Port Island in 1971. At the time, government planners were seeking alternatives to the heavily congested Itami Airport: the original Kobe Airport plan called for six runways more than 3,000 m (9,843 ft) in length on a 1,100 ha (2,700 acres) facility. The mayor of Kobe, Tatsuo Miyazaki, declared his opposition to building such a large airport so close to the city, and was re-elected shortly afterward in 1973, defeating a competitor who supported the airport.

Kobe businesses were still interested in the plan, however, and pressed the city government to propose a smaller facility with one 3,000 m (9,843 ft) runway. This plan was submitted to the Transport Ministry in 1982 as a competitor for the Kansai International Airport plan, which was then being supported by the Osaka and Wakayama prefectural governments. After the national government voiced its displeasure with the Kobe proposal, Kobe officially switched its support to the Kansai Airport proposal in 1984, but in 1985 decided to independently fund the construction of another airport.

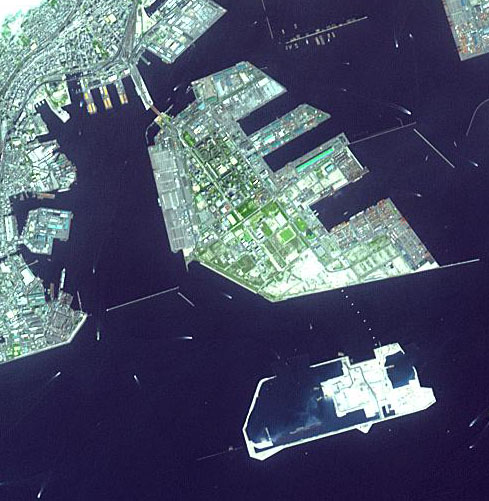
Kobe Airport (bottom) under construction in 2003

The construction of the airport was stalled for lack of funding until 1995, when it won national government support as a means for recovering the Kobe economy in the wake of the Great Hanshin earthquake. Despite ongoing controversy, locals continued to support the plan: in the 1997 mayoral election, the pro-airport coalition won a narrow victory over the anti-airport coalition. Construction began in September 1999 but political controversy continued: 87,000 signatures were collected in a petition to recall the mayor in 2000, and a citizen lawsuit to cancel the project was dismissed in 2004.

The airport finally opened on February 16, 2006, with Japan Airlines operating the first flight and All Nippon Airways operating the first scheduled flight. Both ANA and JAL announced plans to replace portions of their widebody fleet with a larger number of mid-size aircraft, in part because of a need to fill the excess number of flight slots created by Kobe Airport's construction. The airport handled its first international business jet flight in September 2006.

As part of its bankruptcy restructuring, JAL terminated all services out of Kobe and closed its office on June 1, 2010, in response to which Skymark Airlines announced a major expansion at the airport. ANA also cut back services following the airport's opening. Skymark is currently the dominant carrier at Kobe carrying approximately two-thirds of its passengers.

In 2013, Kobe mayor Tatsuo Yada endorsed a proposal to consolidate the management of the three Kansai region airports by adding Kobe Airport to the planned sale in 2014 of operating concessions at Itami and Kansai.

Kobe was already the most indebted municipality in Japan with debts of over ¥3 trillion after the Great Hanshin earthquake, and this project's cost (estimated at over ¥300 billion, or US$3 billion) has made it very controversial. Supporters argue that the third airport can mean increased competition and lower airfares. People in the surrounding regions (Shikoku, Awaji Island etc.) can now have a closer airport while access to Kansai may be limited. Since the ferry from Tokushima to Kansai International Airport was discontinued, travellers have had to rely on alternate means of transportation including a bus to Kansai Airport, which takes an hour longer, or to use the local Tokushima Airport, which is limited in schedules.

On April 1, 2018, Kansai Airports Kobe founded by Orix, Vinci Airports, and Kansai Airports took over the operation of Kobe Airport. April 18, 2025 marked the opening of the international terminal, with flights to international destinations being classified as charters as of that month. Korean Air, VietJet Air and Starlux Airlines have expressed interest to operate international flights to Kobe when the restriction is loosened.

== Airlines and destinations ==
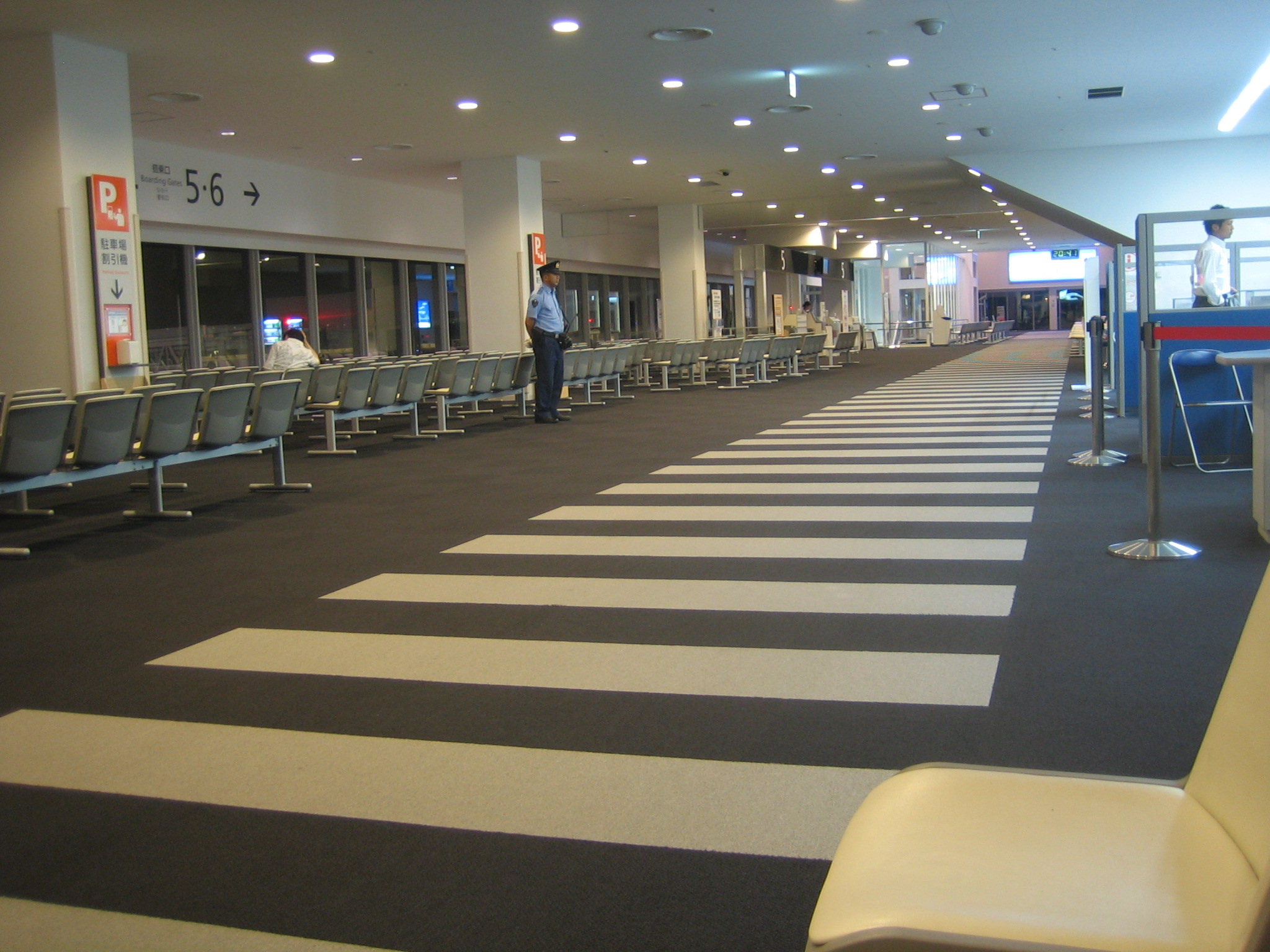
Passenger concourse

Kobe has two passenger terminals, with Terminal 1 serving domestic flights and Terminal 2 international flights.

Airlines	Destinations
Aero K	Seasonal charter: Cheongju
Air Do	Sapporo–Chitose
All Nippon Airways	Sapporo–Chitose, Tokyo–Haneda
Asiana Airlines	Seoul–Incheon
EVA Air	Taipei–Taoyuan
Fuji Dream Airlines	Matsumoto
Jeju Air	Seoul–Incheon
Jin Air	Seoul–Incheon
Korean Air	Seoul–Incheon
Skymark Airlines	Ibaraki, Kagoshima, Nagasaki, Naha, Sapporo–Chitose, Sendai, Shimojishima, Tokyo–Haneda
Solaseed Air	Naha
Starlux Airlines	Kaohsiung (begins 1 January 2027), Taichung, Taipei–Taoyuan
Toki Air	Niigata
Trinity Airways	Seoul–Incheon (begins 18 December 2026)

The Transport Ministry has capped scheduled domestic operations at 30 daily flights, and until 2025 banned international flights with the exception of private aircraft and "own use" charters, in order to prevent overcrowding in the area's airspace and to protect the growth of Kansai Airport. The flight caps have been a point of controversy with Kobe Airport supporters, who point out that the cap was calculated based on Kansai Airport operating twice as many frequencies as are currently offered: given the current traffic levels at Kansai, Kobe should be able to handle six or seven flights per hour.

In April 2025, the new international terminal was opened and scheduled international flights commenced, although they are still technically operated on a "charter" basis.

== Statistics ==
Traffic by fiscal year (from April to March)
	Passengers	Change	Aircraft operations	Load Factor
2005 (Opened in March)	353,673		1,237	72.5%
2006	2,743,004		10,629	60.4%
2007	2,974,983	▲8.5%	10,638	67.0%
2008	2,579,674	▼13.3%	9,859	67.8%
2009	2,337,480	▼9.4%	9,593	70.9%
2010	2,219,887	▼5.0%	9,971	69.2%
2011	2,568,084	▲15.7%	12,141	70.3%
2012	2,410,343	▼6.1%	13,551	64.2%
2013	2,356,327	▼2.2%	13,575	65.2%
2014	2,446,455	▲3.8%	14,020	64.9%
2015	2,546,591	▲4.1%	13,711	67.0%
2016	2,783,636	▲9.3%	12,513	77.4%
2017	3,136,194	▲12.7%	13,868	79.4%
2018	3,190,090	▲1.7%	14,817	80.7%
2019	3,292,298	▲3.2%	16,423	75.8%
2020	1,213,380	▼63.1%	11,614	46.4%
2021	1,752,629	▲44.4%	15,019	48.1%
2022	2,701,440	▲54.1%	16,635	
2023	3,434,858	▲27.1%	17,454	

== Ground and water transportation ==
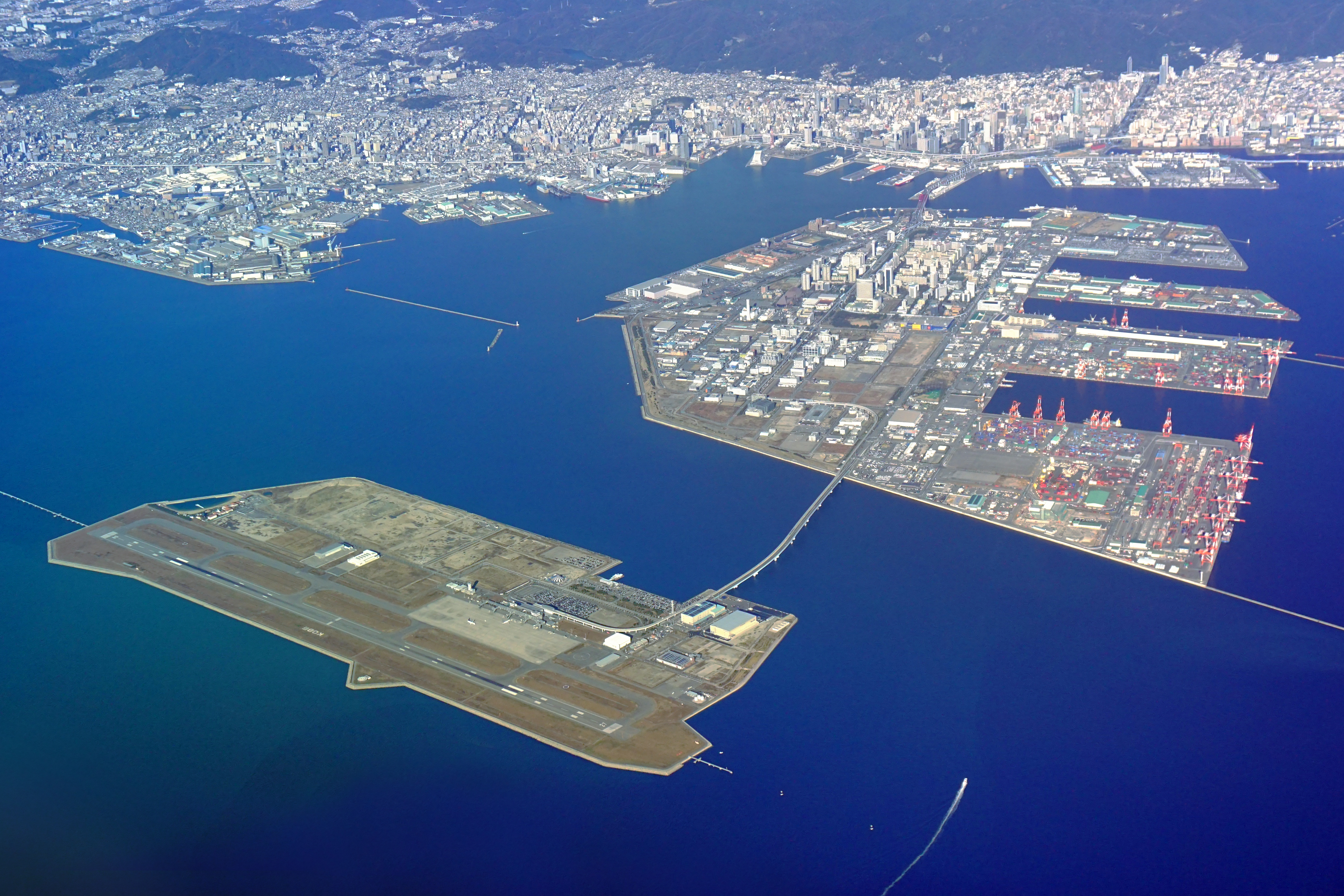
Kobe Airport and transportations to the downtown

On February 2, 2006, Kobe Airport Station was connected to Sannomiya Station in central Kobe by an extension of the existing Port Liner automated guideway transit system. Travel time to Sannomiya is 18 minutes. From Sannomiya, it is around 20 minutes to Ōsaka Station and around 50 minutes to Kyoto Station by the Special Rapid Service on the JR Kobe Line and JR Kyoto Line.

Kobe Airport is connected to Kansai Airport by the Kobe–Kanku Bay Shuttle (神戸-関空ベイ・シャトル), a high speed ferry that completes the airport-to-airport journey in around 30 minutes.

There are bus services to Shin-Kobe Station (on the San'yō Shinkansen), Sannomiya Station, and Kōbe Station every 25–40 minutes.

== Accidents and incidents ==
- At 14:30 on May 31, 2024, a light aircraft belonging to Hirata Gakuen aviation school landed on the airport runway without its wheels being extended during a touch-and-go landing, forcing the affected runway's closure and the cancellation of 34 flights. None of the three people aboard the plane were injured.

== See also ==
- Port of Kobe
- Port Island
- Hanshin Industrial Region
