= Kobe New Transit =

Railway company in Kobe, Japan

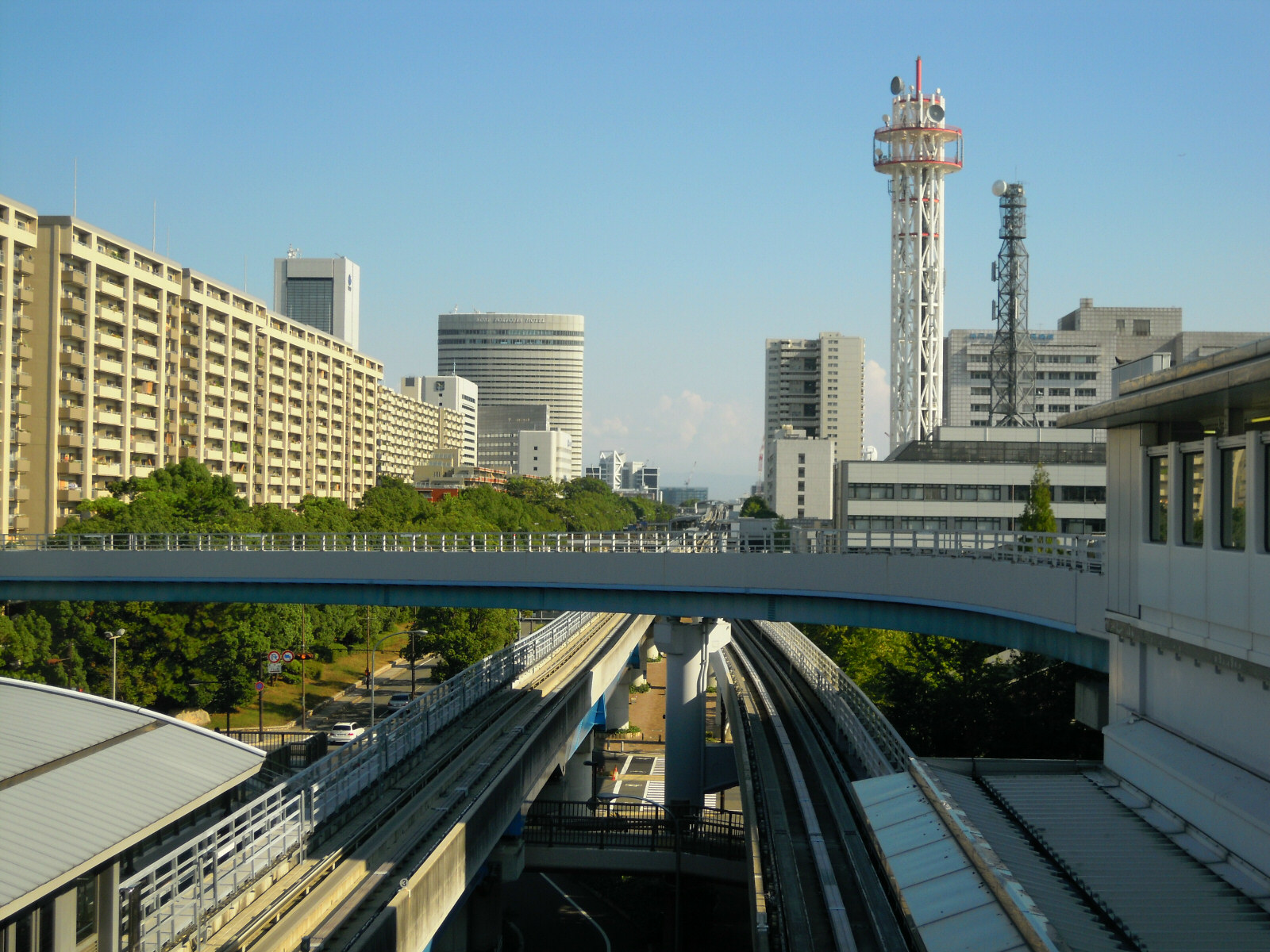
- Port Island Line around the Naka Koen Station
- Native name: 神戸新交通株式会社
- Romanized name: Kōbe Shinkōtsū Kabushiki Kaisha
- Company type: Third sector
- Industry: Transportation
- Founded: 18 July 1977; 48 years ago
- Headquarters: Minatojima, Chūō-ku, Kobe
- Website: Official website

Kōbe New Transit (神戸新交通株式会社, Kōbe Shinkōtsū Kabushiki Kaisha) is the third-sector semipublic company that runs Port Island Line ("Port Liner") and Rokkō Island Line ("Rokkō Liner") automated guideway transit (AGT) systems in Kobe, Japan. When opened in 1981, the Port Liner was the world's first fully automated transport system.

In the Surutto KANSAI stored-fare system, the company is represented by the mark KS on the back of farecards.

== Lines ==
Kōbe New Transit operates following two lines, which connect the artificial islands in the port of Kobe with the mainland:

- Port Island Line (Port Liner)
- Rokkō Island Line (Rokko Liner)

== History ==
- July 18, 1977: Company established
- February 5, 1981: Port Island Line (Port Liner) began operation. The first practical AGT in Japan.
- February 21, 1990: Rokkō Island Line (Rokkō Liner) began operation.
- February 2, 2006: Port Liner extended to Kobe Airport.

== Rolling stock ==
=== Current ===
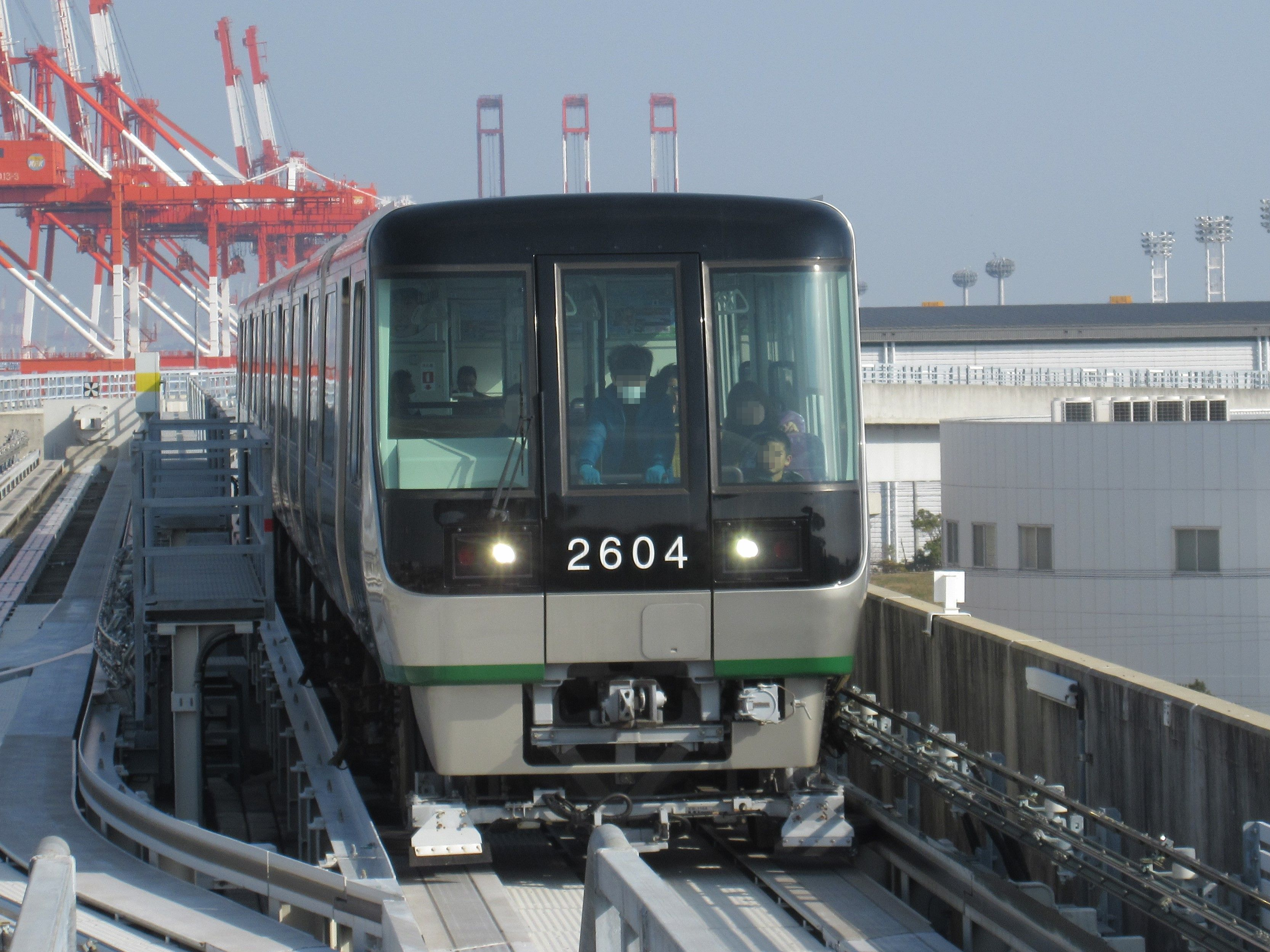
Kobe New Transit 2000 series trainset

- 1000 series
- 2000 series
- 2020 series
- 3000 series

=== Former ===
- 8000 series

== See also ==
- Monorails in Japan
- Transport in Keihanshin
- List of metro systems
