= Port Island =

Japanese man made island

Native name: ポートアイランド
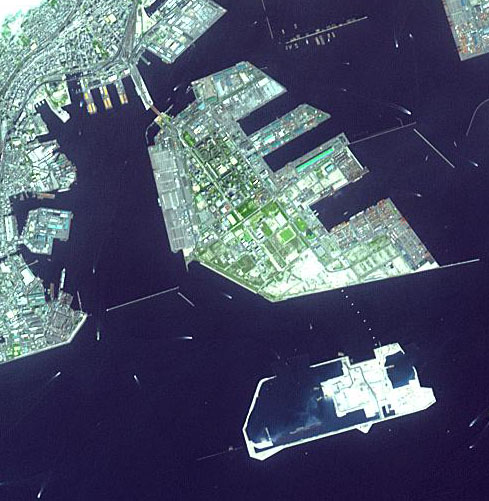
- Satellite image of Port Island in 2003, with Kobe Airport under construction to the south
- Interactive map of Port Island

Geography
- Location: Osaka Bay
- Coordinates: 34°40′N 135°13′E
- Type: Artificial island
- Area: 8.33 km^{2} (3.22 sq mi)

Administration
- Japan
- Prefecture: Hyōgo Prefecture
- City: Kobe

Demographics
- Population: 15,234 (2020)

Port Island (ポートアイランド, Pōto Airando) is an artificial island in Chuo-ku, Kobe, Japan. It was constructed between 1966 and 1980 (Phase 1) and between 1987 and 2009 (Phase 2) at the Port of Kobe, and officially opened with an exposition called "Portopia '81." It now houses a heliport, numerous hotels, a large convention center, the UCC Coffee Museum, Japan's third IKEA store, and several parks.

The Port Liner automated guideway transit system connects Port Island to Sannomiya Station and to Kobe Airport. Road access between the island and the mainland is provided by Kobe Bridge, completed in 1970, and the Minatojima Tunnel, which opened in 1999.

== Overview ==
- Area 8.33 km^{2}
- Facilities
  - Universities: Kobe Women's University and Kobe Gakuin University
  - Hospitals: Kobe City Medical Center General Hospital and Hyogo Prefectural Kobe Children's Hospital
  - Hotels
  - Kobe Convention Center
  - Heliport
  - Institutes, including Riken Kobe Center, where the Fugaku supercomputer is installed
  - Liner berths
  - Container ship berths
  - Kobe Animal Kingdom
  - World Memorial Hall

== See also ==
- Rokkō Island - another artificial island in Kobe, housing port facilities and residential and commercial buildings.
