= List of through trains in Japan =

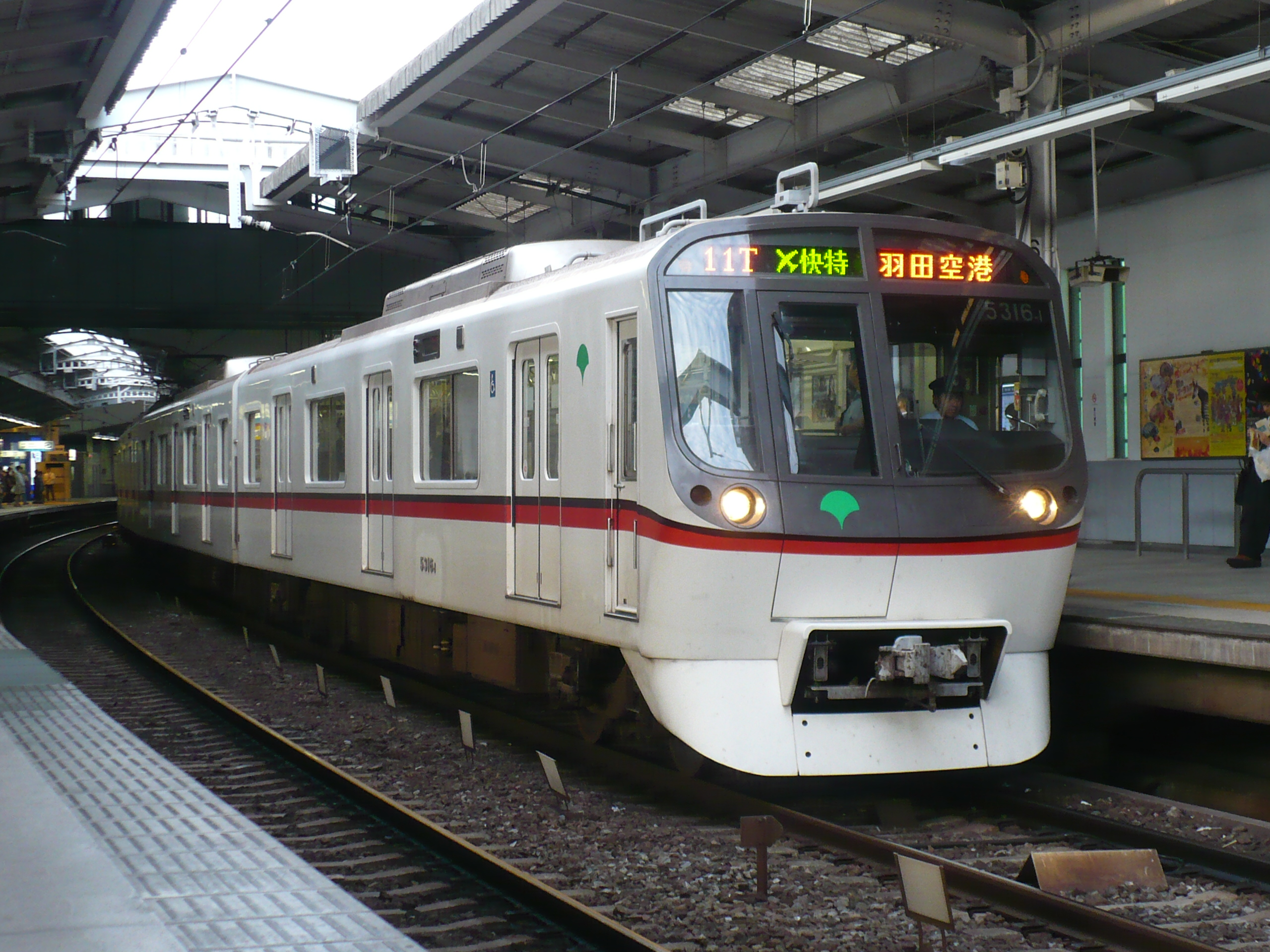
Toei Asakusa Line Airport Limited Express headed for Haneda Airport, on the Keikyu Main Line owned by private operator Keikyu. The line was the first subway line that offered through services in Tokyo.

Japan operates a variety of through-services (直通運転, chokutsu-unten) or nori-ire (乗り入れ) or through trains which are direct seamless connections between rail operators, using leased trackage rights and junctions, to cut cross metropolitan area commutes without having to change trains, wait, figure out connections, or cross platforms/stations. Most of these junctions have been constructed well after the lines have been operating. Some far-flung spur lines have been shortened (abandoned stations and track due to low patronage); through service is a frequently used method to integrate the surviving short stub lines into multiple rail operator's systems, enhancing convenience and ridership. Through-service proliferation is increasingly common phenomenon as the railway networks, urban density (and Japan's demographics) have matured and new line construction is minimal.

There are several dozen unique through service runs in Japan, the actual track usage details are complex (but as a seamless service offers an abstraction layer for the end user), the Japanese Wikipedia page has a complete list. Standardization is required for cross railway services, in terms of rolling stock dimensions, rail gauge, overhead power, not to mention coordinated scheduling between a mixture of separate companies and/or government agencies.

Through services in Japan are commonly of two types: unidirectional or bidirectional (unidirectional trains return empty on non-circular tracks). The first usage of through services was on the Tobu Kameido Line in 1904, but was suspended in 1910. Japan's first modern (postwar) through services began in 1960, from the Toei Asakusa Line to Keisei Oshiage Line.

There are also through services that have been discontinued (not listed here).

== List of existing services (passenger) ==
The Tokyo subway system and through-services map. Hibiya Line's through-service to Tōkyū Tōyoko Line had been abolished because Fukutoshin Line's through-service to Tōkyū Tōyoko Line had been started. But the north terminus of Hibiya Line's through-service had been extended to Minami-Kurihashi Station on the Tōbu Nikkō Line.

=== Greater Tokyo Area private railways ===
- Tokyo Metro
  - Hibiya Line : Naka-Meguro Station to Minami-Kurihashi Station (64.6 km)
    - Hibiya Line 20.3 km (Naka-Meguro to Kita-Senju)
    - Tobu Skytree Line 33.9 km (Kita-Senju to Tōbu-Dōbutsu-Kōen as local train)
    - Tōbu Nikkō Line 10.4 km (Tōbu-Dōbutsu-Kōen to Minami-Kurihashi as local train)
  - Tōzai Line : Mitaka Station to Tōyō-Katsutadai Station (56.4 km)
    - JR East Chūō-Sōbu Line 9.4 km (Mitaka to Nakano as local train)
    - Tōzai Line 30.8 km (Nakano to Nishi-Funabashi)
    - Tōyō Rapid Railway Line 16.2 km (Nishi-Funabashi to Tōyō-Katsutadai)
  - Tōzai Line : Mitaka Station to Tsudanuma Station (46.3 km)
    - JR East Chūō-Sōbu Line 9.4 km (Mitaka to Nakano as local train)
    - Tōzai Line 30.8 km (Nakano to Nishi-Funabashi)
    - JR East Chūō-Sōbu Line 6.1 km (Nishi-Funabashi to Tsudanuma as local train)
  - Chiyoda Line : Hakone-Yumoto Station, Hon-Atsugi Station to Kita-Senju Station (Metro Hakone, Metro Sagami and Metro Homeway Romancecar limited express) (104.4 km)
    - Hakone Tozan Line 6.1 km (Hakone-Yumoto to Odawara)
    - Odakyu Odawara Line 79.0 km (Odawara to Yoyogi-Uehara via Hon-Atsugi and Shin-Yurigaoka)
    - Chiyoda Line 19.3 km (Yoyogi-Uehara to Kita-Senju)
  - Chiyoda Line : Hon-Atsugi Station to Kita-Ayase Station (65.9 km)
    - Odakyu Odawara Line 41.9 km (Hon-Atsugi to Yoyogi-Uehara)
    - Chiyoda Line 24.0 km (Yoyogi-Uehara to Kita-Ayase)
  - Chiyoda Line : Hon-Atsugi Station to Toride Station (93.5 km)
    - Odakyu Odawara Line 41.9 km (Hon-Atsugi to Yoyogi-Uehara)
    - Chiyoda Line 21.9 km (Yoyogi-Uehara to Ayase)
    - Jōban Line 29.7 km (Ayase to Toride as local train)
  - Yūrakuchō Line : Shinrinkōen Station to Shin-Kiba Station (68.4 km)
    - Tōbu Tōjō Line 40.1 km (Shinrinkōen to Wakōshi as local train)
    - Yūrakuchō Line 28.3 km (Wakōshi to Shin-Kiba via Kotake-Mukaihara)
  - Yūrakuchō Line : Hannō Station to Shin-Kiba Station (60.3 km)
    - Seibu Ikebukuro Line 37.7 km (Hannō to Nerima as local train, Semi-Express, Rapid or Rapid Express)
    - Seibu Yūrakuchō Line 2.6 km (Nerima to Kotake-Mukaihara)
    - Yūrakuchō Line 20.0 km (Kotake-Mukaihara to Shin-Kiba)
  - Hanzōmon Line : Chūō-Rinkan Station to Kuki Station (94.9 km)
    - Tōkyū Den-en-toshi Line 31.5 km (Chūō-Rinkan to Shibuya)
    - Hanzōmon Line 16.8 km (Shibuya to Oshiage)
    - Tōbu Skytree Line 39.9 km (Oshiage to Tōbu-Dōbutsu-Kōen as Semi-Express or Express)
    - Tōbu Isesaki Line 6.7 km (Tōbu-Dōbutsu-Kōen to Kuki as Semi-Express or Express)
  - Hanzōmon Line : Chūō-Rinkan Station to Minami-Kurihashi Station (98.6 km)
    - Tōkyū Den-en-toshi Line 31.5 km (Chūō-Rinkan to Shibuya)
    - Hanzōmon Line 16.8 km (Shibuya to Oshiage)
    - Tōbu Skytree Line 39.9 km (Oshiage to Tōbu-Dōbutsu-Kōen as Semi-Express or Express)
    - Tōbu Nikkō Line 10.4 km (Tōbu-Dōbutsu-Kōen to Minami-Kurihashi as Semi-Express or Express)
  - Namboku Line : Ebina Station to Urawa-Misono Station (90.1 km)
    - Sōtetsu Main Line 17.7 km (Ebina to Nishiya)
    - Sōtetsu Shin-yokohama Line 6.3 km (Nishiya to Shin-Yokohama)
    - Tōkyū Shin-yokohama Line 5.8 km (Shin-Yokohama to Hiyoshi)
    - Tōkyū Meguro Line 11.9 km (Hiyoshi to Meguro via Den-en-chōfu)
    - Namboku Line 21.3 km (Meguro to Akabane-Iwabuchi via Shirokane-Takanawa)
    - Saitama Rapid Railway Line 14.6 km (Akabane-Iwabuchi to Urawa-Misono)
  - Namboku Line : Shōnandai Station to Urawa-Misono Station (87.3 km)
    - Sōtetsu Izumino Line 11.3 km (Shōnandai to Futamatagawa)
    - Sōtetsu Main Line 3.6 km (Futamatagawa to Nishiya)
    - Sōtetsu Shin-yokohama Line 6.3 km (Nishiya to Shin-Yokohama)
    - Tōkyū Shin-yokohama Line 5.8 km (Shin-Yokohama to Hiyoshi)
    - Tōkyū Meguro Line 11.9 km (Hiyoshi to Meguro via Den-en-chōfu)
    - Namboku Line 21.3 km (Meguro to Akabane-Iwabuchi via Shirokane-Takanawa)
    - Saitama Rapid Railway Line 14.6 km (Akabane-Iwabuchi to Urawa-Misono)
  - Fukutoshin Line : Shinrinkōen Station to Motomachi-Chūkagai Station (88.6 km)
    - Tōbu Tōjō Line 40.1 km (Shinrinkōen to Wakōshi as local train)
    - Fukutoshin Line 20.2 km (Wakōshi to Shibuya via Kotake-Mukaihara)
    - Tōkyū Tōyoko Line 24.2 km (Shibuya to Yokohama via Den-en-chōfu and Hiyoshi)
    - Minatomirai Line 4.1 km (Yokohama to Motomachi-Chūkagai)
  - Fukutoshin Line : Hannō Station to Motomachi-Chūkagai Station (80.5 km)
    - Seibu Ikebukuro Line 37.7 km (Hannō to Nerima as local train, Semi-Express, Rapid or Rapid Express)
    - Seibu Yūrakuchō Line 2.6 km (Nerima to Kotake-Mukaihara)
    - Fukutoshin Line 11.9 km (Kotake-Mukaihara to Shibuya)
    - Tōkyū Tōyoko Line 24.2 km (Shibuya to Yokohama via Den-en-chōfu and Hiyoshi)
    - Minatomirai Line 4.1 km (Yokohama to Motomachi-Chūkagai)
- Tokyo Metropolitan Bureau of Transportation (Toei Subway)
    - Asakusa Line : Misakiguchi Station, Uraga Station, Zushi·Hayama Station, Haneda Airport Domestic Terminal Station or Nishi-magome Station to Narita Airport Terminal 1 Station(via Keisei Narita Airport Line or Keisei Main Line) or Shibayama-Chiyoda Station (e.g., 85.4 km from Haneda Airport Domestic Terminal to Narita Airport Terminal 1 via Keisei Narita Airport Line)
      - 1.Keikyū Kurihama Line 13.4 km (Misakiguchi to Horinouchi)
      - 2.Keikyū Main Line 4.4 km (Uraga to Horinouchi)
      - —=1. and 2. merged at Horinouchi Station—=
      - 2.Keikyū Main Line 11.4 km (Horinouchi to Kanazawa-hakkei)
      - 3.Keikyū Zushi Line 5.9 km (Zushi·Hayama to Kanazawa-hakkei)
      - —=2. and 3. merged at Kanazawa-hakkei Station—=
      - 2.Keikyū Main Line 32.9 km (Kanazawa-hakkei to Keikyū Kamata)
      - 4.Keikyū Airport Line 6.5 km (Haneda Airport Domestic Terminal to Keikyū Kamata)
      - —=2. and 4. merged at Keikyū Kamata Station—=
      - 2.Keikyū Main Line 9.2 km (Keikyū Kamata to Sengakuji)
      - 5.Toei Asakusa Line 6.9 km (Nishi-magome to Sengakuji)
      - —=2. and 5. merged at Sengakuji Station—=
      - 5.Toei Asakusa Line 11.4 km (Sengakuji to Oshiage)
      - 6.Keisei Oshiage Line 5.7 km (Oshiage to Aoto)
      - —=5. and 6. connected at Oshiage Station—=
      - —=6. and 7. connected at Aoto Station—=
      - 7.Keisei Main Line (from Keisei Ueno Station) 1.2 km (Aoto to Keisei-Takasago)
      - —=8. branched from 7. at Keisei-Takasago Station—=
      - 8.Keisei Narita Airport Line 51.4 km (Keisei-Takasago to Narita Airport Terminal 1)**** 7.Keisei Main Line 48.5 km (Keisei-Takasago to Keisei Narita)
      - —=9. branched from 7. at Keisei Narita Station—=
      - 7.Keisei Main Line 8.1 km (Keisei Narita to Narita Airport Terminal 1)
      - 9.Keisei Higashi-Narita Line 7.1 km (Keisei Narita to Higashi-Narita)
      - —=9. and 10. connected at Higashi-Narita Station—=
      - 10.Shibayama Railway Line 2.2 km (Higashi-Narita to Shibayama-Chiyoda)
    - Mita Line : Ebina Station to Nishi-Takashimadaira Station (67.7 km)
      - Sōtetsu Main Line 17.7 km (Ebina to Nishiya)
      - Sōtetsu Shin-yokohama Line 6.3 km (Nishiya to Shin-Yokohama)
      - Tōkyū Shin-yokohama Line 5.8 km (Shin-Yokohama to Hiyoshi)
      - Tōkyū Meguro Line 11.9 km (Hiyoshi to Meguro via Den-en-chōfu)
      - Toei Mita Line 26.5 km (Meguro to Nishi-Takashimadaira via Shirokane-Takanawa)
    - Mita Line : Shōnandai Station to Nishi-Takashimadaira Station (64.9 km)
      - Sōtetsu Izumino Line 11.3 km (Shōnandai to Futamatagawa)
      - Sōtetsu Main Line 3.6 km (Futamatagawa to Nishiya)
      - Sōtetsu Shin-yokohama Line 6.3 km (Nishiya to Shin-Yokohama)
      - Tōkyū Shin-yokohama Line 5.8 km (Shin-Yokohama to Hiyoshi)
      - Tōkyū Meguro Line 11.9 km (Hiyoshi to Meguro via Den-en-chōfu)
      - Toei Mita Line 26.5 km (Meguro to Nishi-Takashimadaira via Shirokane-Takanawa)
    - Shinjuku Line : Takaosanguchi Station to Motoyawata Station (68.2 km)
      - Keiō Takao Line 8.6 km (Takaosanguchi to Kitano as local train or Express)
      - Keiō Line 32.5 km (Kitano to Sasazuka via Chōfu as local train, Rapid, Semi-Express or Express)
      - Keiō New Line 3.6 km (Sasazuka to Shinjuku)
      - Toei Shinjuku Line 23.5 km (Shinjuku to Motoyawata)
    - Shinjuku Line : Hashimoto Station to Motoyawata Station (61.6 km)
      - Keiō Sagamihara Line 22.6 km (Hashimoto to Chōfu as local train, Rapid, Semi-Express or Express)
      - Keiō Line 11.9 km (Chōfu to Sasazuka as local train, Rapid, Semi-Express or Express)
      - Keiō New Line 3.6 km (Sasazuka to Shinjuku)
      - Toei Shinjuku Line 23.5 km (Shinjuku to Motoyawata)
- Tobu Railway
  - Nikkō Line : Shinjuku Station to Tōbu-Nikkō Station (Nikkō and Spacia Nikkō limited express) (140.7 km)
    - JR East Yamanote Freight Line 10.0 km (Shinjuku to Tabata)
    - JR East Tōhoku Main Line 50.1 km (Tabata to Kurihashi)
    - Tōbu Nikkō Line 80.6 km (Kurihashi to Tōbu-Nikkō via Shimo-Imaichi)
  - Nikkō Line : Shinjuku Station to Kinugawa-Onsen Station (Kinugawa and Spacia Kinugawa limited express) (146.0 km)
    - JR East Yamanote Freight Line 10.0 km (Shinjuku to Tabata)
    - JR East Tōhoku Main Line 50.1 km (Tabata to Kurihashi)
    - Tōbu Nikkō Line 73.5 km (Kurihashi to Shimo-Imaichi)
    - Tōbu Kinugawa Line 12.4 km (Shimo-Imaichi to Kinugawa-Onsen)
  - Nikkō Line : Asakusa Station to Aizu-Tajima Station (Section-Rapid or Rapid) (146.0 km)
    - Tōbu Skytree Line 41.0 km (Asakusa to Tōbu-Dōbutsu-Kōen)
    - Tōbu Nikkō Line 87.4 km (Tōbu-Dōbutsu-Kōen to Shimo-Imaichi)
    - Tōbu Kinugawa Line 16.2 km (Shimo-Imaichi to Shin-Fujiwara via Kinugawa-Onsen)
    - Yagan Railway Aizu Kinugawa Line 30.7 km (Shin-Fujiwara to Aizukōgen-Ozeguchi)
    - Aizu Railway Aizu Line 15.4 km (Aizukōgen-Ozeguchi to Aizu-Tajima)
- Odakyu Electric Railway
  - Odawara Line : Shinjuku Station to Hakone-Yumoto Station (Homeway, Sagami, Hakone and Super Hakone Romancecar limited express) (104.4 km)
    - Odakyu Odawara Line (Shinjuku to Odawara) 82.5 km
    - Hakone Tozan Line 6.1 km (Odawara to Hakone-Yumoto)
  - Odawara Line : Shinjuku Station to Gotemba Station (Asagiri Romancecar limited express) (96.8 km)
    - Odakyu Odawara Line (Shinjuku to Matsuda) 71.8 km
    - JR Central Gotemba Line (Matsuda to Gotemba) 25.0 km
- Sagami Railway
  - Sōtetsu-JR Direct Line : Ebina Station to Shinjuku Station (57 km)
    - Sōtetsu Main Line (Ebina to Futamata-gawa)
    - Sōtetsu Shin-Yokohama Line (Futamata-gawa to Nishiya)
    - Sōtetsu-JR Direct Line (Nishiya to Musashi-Kosugi)
    - JR Tōkaidō Main Line (Musashi-Kosugi to Ōsaki)
    - JR Yamanote Line (Ōsaki to Shinjuku)
- Fuji Kyuko
  - Fujikyuko Line : Tōkyō Station to Kawaguchiko Station (114.4 km)
    - JR East Chūō Main Line (Tōkyō to Ōtsuki) 87.8 km
    - Fujikyuko Line (Ōtsuki to Kawaguchiko) 26.6 km

=== Keihanshin private railways ===
  - Osaka Metro
    - Midōsuji Line : Minoh-kayano Station to Nakamozu Station (32.9 km)
      - Kita-Osaka Kyuko Railway Namboku Line (Minoh-kayano to Esaka) 8.4 km
      - Osaka Municipal Subway Midōsuji Line (Esaka to Nakamozu) 24.5 km
    - Chūō Line : Cosmosquare Station to Gakken Nara-Tomigaoka (36.7 km)
      - Osaka Municipal Subway Chūō Line (Cosmosquare to Nagata) 17.9 km
      - Kintetsu Keihanna Line (Nagata to Gakken Nara-Tomigaoka) 18.8 km
    - Sakaisuji Line : Kawaramachi Station to Tengachaya Station (52.7 km)
      - Hankyu Kyoto Main Line (Kawaramachi to Awaji as local train or Semi-Express) 41.1 km
      - Hankyu Senri Line (Awaji to Tenjimbashisuji 6-chome) 3.5 km
      - Osaka Municipal Subway Sakaisuji Line (Tenjimbashisuji 6-chome to Tengachaya) 8.1 km
    - Sakaisuji Line : Kita-Senri Station to Tengachaya Station (21.7 km)
      - Hankyu Senri Line (Kita-Senri to Tenjimbashisuji 6-chome via Awaji as local train) 13.6 km
      - Osaka Municipal Subway Sakaisuji Line (Tenjimbashisuji 6-chome to Tengachaya) 8.1 km
  - Hankyu and Nose Electric Railway : Hankyū Umeda Station to Nissei-chuo Station (28.0 km)
      - Hankyu Takarazuka Main Line (Hankyū Umeda to Kawanishi-Noseguchi as Limited Express) 17.2 km
      - Nose Electric Railway Myōken Line (Kawanishi-Noseguchi to Yamashita as Limited Express) 8.2 km
      - Nose Electric Railway Nissei Line (Yamashita to Nissei-chuo as Limited Express) 2.6 km
  - Kintetsu and Hanshin Electric Railway : Kintetsu Nara Station to Kobe-sannomiya Station (65.2 km)
      - Nara Line (Kintetsu Nara to Fuse) 26.7 km
      - Osaka Line (Fuse to Ōsaka Uehommachi) 4.1 km
      - Kintetsu Namba Line (Ōsaka Uehommachi to Ōsaka Namba) 2.0 km
      - Hanshin Namba Line (Ōsaka Namba to Amagasaki) 10.1 km
      - Hanshin Main Line (Amagasaki to Kobe-sannomiya as Rapid-Express) 22.3 km
  - Kōbe Rapid Transit Railway
    - Tōzai Line : Hanshin Umeda Station to Sanyo Himeji Station (91.8 km)
      - Hanshin Main Line (Hanshin Umeda to Motomachi via Amagasaki and Kobe-sannomiya) 32.1 km
      - Kōbe Rapid Transit Railway Tōzai Line (Motomachi to Nishidai via Kōsoku Kōbe and Shinkaichi) 5.0 km
      - Sanyo Electric Railway Main Line (Nishidai to Sanyo Himeji) 54.7 km
    - Tōzai Line : Hankyū Umeda Station to Shinkaichi Station (35.1 km)
      - Hankyū Kōbe Main Line (Hankyū Umeda to Kōbe Sannomiya) 32.3 km
      - Kōbe Rapid Transit Railway Tōzai Line (Kōbe Sannomiya to Shinkaichi via Kōsoku Kōbe) 2.8 km
    - Namboku Line : Shinkaichi Station to Ao Station (37.1 km)
      - Kōbe Rapid Transit Railway Namboku Line (Shinkaichi to Minatogawa) 0.4 km
      - Kobe Electric Railway Arima Line (Minatogawa to Suzurandai) 7.5 km
      - Kobe Electric Railway Ao Line (Suzurandai to Ao) 29.2 km
    - Namboku Line : Shinkaichi Station to Sanda Station (32.4 km)
      - Kōbe Rapid Transit Railway Namboku Line (Shinkaichi to Minatogawa) 0.4 km
      - Kobe Electric Railway Arima Line (Minatogawa to Arimaguchi via Suzurandai) 20.0 km
      - Kobe Electric Railway Sanda Line (Arimaguchi to Sanda) 12.0 km
    - Namboku Line : Shinkaichi Station to Arima Onsen Station (22.9 km)
      - Kōbe Rapid Transit Railway Namboku Line (Shinkaichi to Minatogawa) 0.4 km
      - Kobe Electric Railway Arima Line (Minatogawa to Arima Onsen via Suzurandai and Arimaguchi) 22.5 km
  - Kyoto Municipal Subway
    - Karasuma Line : Kokusaikaikan Station to Kintetsu Nara Station (49.1 km)
      - Kyoto Municipal Subway Karasuma Line (Kokusaikaikan to Takeda) 13.7 km
      - Kyoto Line (Takeda to Yamato-Saidaiji as local train or Express) 31.0 km
      - Nara Line (Yamato-Saidaiji to Kintetsu Nara) 4.4 km
    - Tōzai Line : Uzumasa Tenjingawa Station to Hamaōtsu Station (16.3 km)
      - Kyoto Municipal Subway Tozai Line (Uzumasa Tenjingawa to Misasagi) 8.8 km
      - Keihan Keishin Line (Misasagi to Hamaōtsu) 7.5 km

=== Chukyo ===
  - Nagoya Municipal Subway
    - Tsurumai Line : Inuyama Station to Toyotashi Station (58.4 km)
      - Meitetsu Inuyama Line (Inuyama to Kami-Otai as local train or Express) 21.4 km
      - Nagoya Municipal Subway Tsurumai Line (Kami-Otai to Akaike) 20.4 km
      - Meitetsu Toyota Line (Akaike to Umetsubo) 15.2 km
      - Meitetsu Mikawa Line (Umetsubo to Toyotashi) 1.4 km
    - Kamiiida Line : Inuyama Station to Heian-dōri Station (21.4 km)
      - Meitetsu Komaki Line (Inuyama to Kamiiida) 20.6 km
      - Nagoya Municipal Subway Kamiiida Line (Kamiiida to Heian-dōri) 0.8 km

=== Kyushu (Fukuoka) ===
- JR Kyushu Chikuhi Line via Meinohama Station to Fukuoka City Subway Airport Line

=== Through services between JR companies ===
- JR Hokkaido Hokkaido Shinkansen via Shin-Aomori Station to JR East Tohoku Shinkansen
- JR East Tokaido Main Line via Atami Station to JR Central Tokaido Main Line
- JR East Shinonoi Line and Chuo Main Line via Tatsuno Station to JR Central Iida Line
- JR East Shinonoi Line via Shiojiri Station to JR Central Chuo Main Line
- JR East Hokuriku Shinkansen via Jōetsumyōkō Station to JR West Hokuriku Shinkansen
- JR Central Tokaido Shinkansen via Shin-Osaka Station to JR West Sanyo Shinkansen
- JR Central Tokaido Main Line via Maibara Station to JR West Tokaido Main Line
- JR West Uno Line to Honshi-Bisan Line via Kojima Station to JR Shikoku Honshi-Bisan Line to Yosan Line, Dosan Line and Kōtoku Line (Seto-Ōhashi Line)
- JR West Sanyo Shinkansen via Hakata Station to JR Kyushu Kyushu Shinkansen

=== Services between JR railway lines and third-sector lines ===
- JR East Ōminato Line via Noheji Station to Aoimori Railway Line
- JR East Tohoku Main Line via Morioka Station to Iwate Galaxy Railway Line
- JR East Hanawa Line via Kōma Station to Iwate Galaxy Railway Line
- Abukuma Express Line via Tsukinoki Station to JR East Tohoku Main Line
- Aizu Railway Aizu Line via Nishi-Wakamatsu Station to JR East Tadami Line
- Tokyo Waterfront Area Rapid Transit Rinkai Line via Ōsaki Station to JR East Saikyō Line and Kawagoe Line
- Hokuetsu Express Hokuhoku Line via Muikamachi Station to JR East Jōetsu Line and via Saigata Station to JR East Shin'etsu Main Line
- JR East Iiyama Line via Toyono Station to Shinano Railway Kita-Shinano Line
- Shinano Railway Shinano Line via Shinonoi Station to JR East Shinonoi Line
- JR East Shin'etsu Main Line via Naoetsu Station to Echigo Tokimeki Myōkō Haneuma Line
- Aichi Loop Line via Kōzōji Station to JR Central Chūō Main Line
- Ise Railway via Yokkaichi Station to JR Central Kansai Main Line and via Tsu Station to JR Central Kisei Main Line
- JR West Nanao Line via Tsubata Station to IR Ishikawa Railway
- JR West San'in Main Line and Fukuchiyama Line via Fukuchiyama Station to Kyoto Tango Railway Miyafuku and Miyazu Lines
- Chizu Express via Kamigōri Station to JR West San'yo Main line and via Chizu Station to JR West Inbi Line
- Wakasa Line via Kōge Station to JR West Inbi Line
- Ibara Line via Kannabe Station to JR West Fukuen Line
- Nishikigawa Seiryū Line via Kawanishi Station to JR West Gantoku Line
- JR Shikoku Dosan Line via Gomen Station to Tosa Kuroshio Railway Gomen-Nahari Line and via Kubokawa Station to Tosa Kuroshio Railway Nakamura Line and Sukumo Line
- JR Shikoku Yodo Line via Wakai Station to Tosa Kuroshio Railway Nakamura Line
- Hisatsu Orange Railway via Yatsushiro Station and Sendai Station to JR Kyushu Kagoshima Main Line

=== Services between third-sector railways ===
- Aoimori Railway and Iwate Galaxy Railway at Metoki Station
- Yagan Railway and Aizu Railway at Aizukōgen-Ozeguchi Station
- Echigo Tokimeki Railway and Ainokaze Toyama Railway at Ichiburi Station
- Ainokaze Toyama Railway and IR Ishikawa Railway at Kurikara Station
