= Nishi-Motomachi Station =

Railway station in Kobe, Japan

Coordinates: 34°41′2.04″N 135°10′46.52″E

Nishi-Motomachi 西元町駅
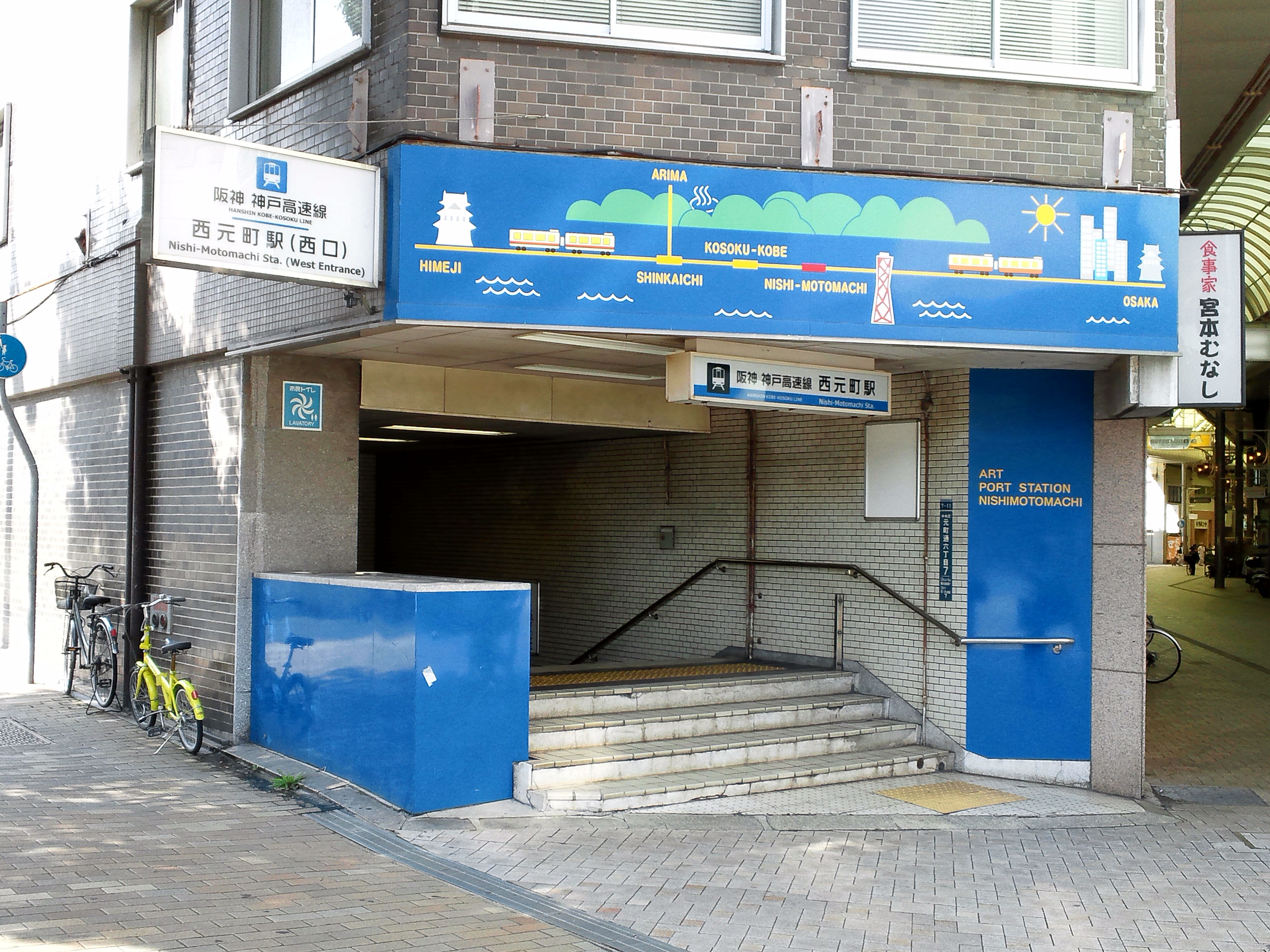
- West exit to Nishi-Motomachi station

General information
- Owner: Kobe Rapid Transit Railway
- Operator: Hanshin Electric Railway
- Line: Kobe Kosoku Line
- Platforms: 2 side platforms
- Tracks: 2

Other information
- Station code: HS34

History
- Opened: April 7, 1968
- Rebuilt: January 18, 1995 – January 17, 1996

Services
Hanshin Railway Kōbe Kōsoku Line (HS 34)
Motomachi (HS 33)	Hanshin Local	Kōsoku Kōbe (HS 35)
Motomachi (HS 33)	Sanyo Local	Kōsoku Kōbe (HS 35)
Motomachi (HS 33)	Rapid Express (3 eastbound trains only, on weekends and holidays)	Kōsoku Kōbe (HS 35)
Motomachi (HS 33)	Hanshin Limited Express	Kōsoku Kōbe (HS 35)
Motomachi (HS 33)	Through Limited Express (yellow marking)	Kōsoku Kōbe (HS 35)
Through Limited Express (red marking): Does not stop at this station
S Limited Express: Does not stop at this station
Location

Nishi-Motomachi Station (西元町駅, Nishi-Motomachi-eki; station number: HS 34) is a train station on the Hanshin Railway Kōbe Kōsoku Line in Chūō-ku, Kobe, Hyōgo Prefecture, Japan.

== Layout ==
The station has two tracks with two side platforms. Elevator access is only available at the east exit.

1	■ ■Kōbe Kōsoku Line	for Sannomiya, Koshien, Amagasaki and Osaka (Umeda); Change trains at Sannomiya or Amagasaki for Ōsaka Namba and Nara
2	■ ■Kōbe Kōsoku Line	for Kosoku Kobe, Shinkaichi, Akashi and Himeji; Change trains at Shinkaichi for the Shintetsu Line

== History ==
The station opened on 7 April 1968.

Damage to the station was caused by the Great Hanshin earthquake in January 1995.

Station numbering was introduced on 1 April 2014.
