= Daikai Station =

Railway station in Kobe, Japan

Coordinates: 34.6713°N 135.1615°E

Daikai Station 大開
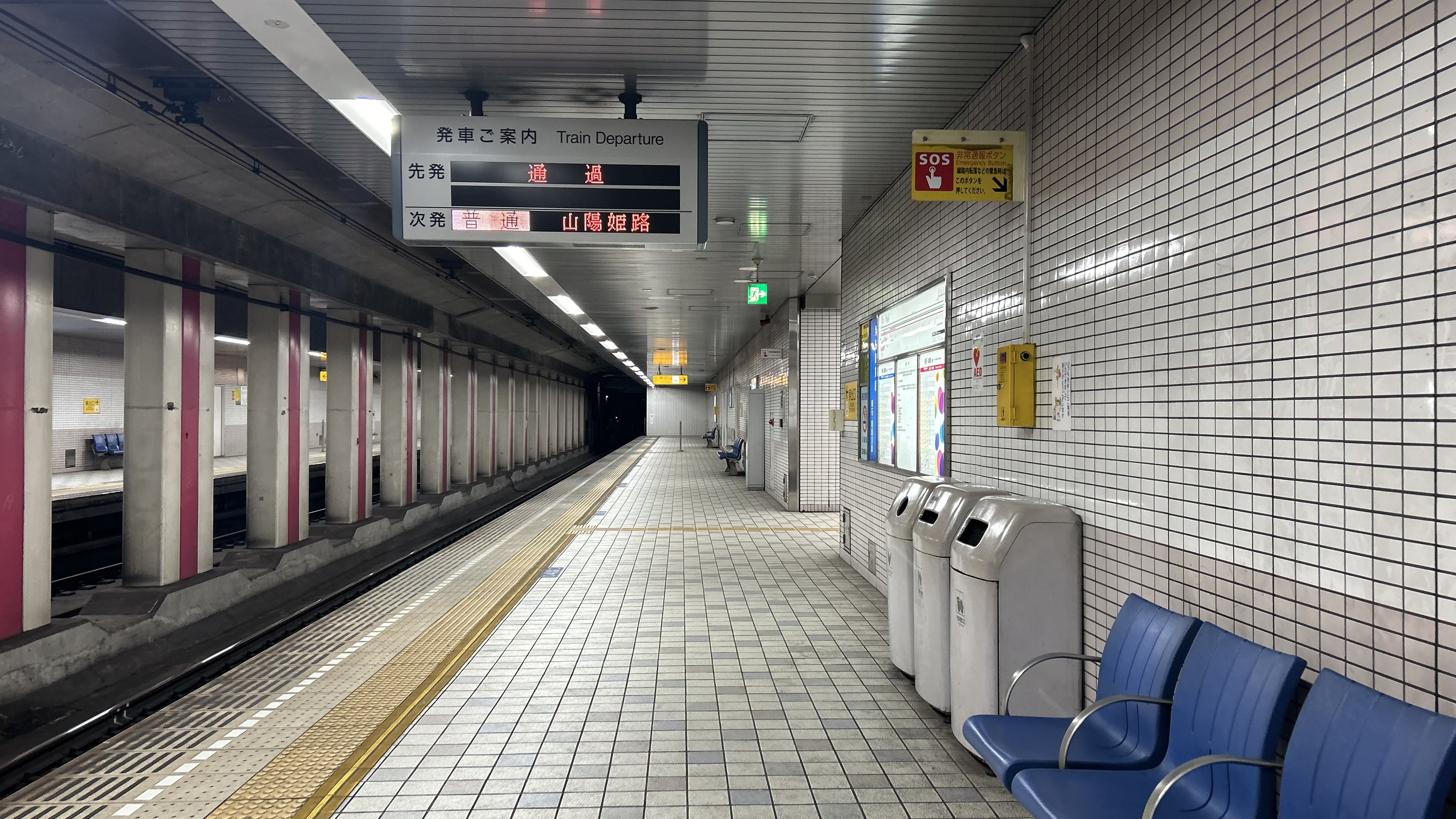
- Hanshin Kobe Kosoku Line Daikai Station platforms

General information
- Owner: Kobe Rapid Transit Railway
- Operator: Hanshin Electric Railway
- Line: Kobe Kosoku Line
- Platforms: 2 side platforms
- Tracks: 2

Other information
- Station code: HS37

History
- Opened: April 7, 1968
- Rebuilt: January 18, 1995 – January 17, 1996
Location

Daikai Station (大開駅, Daikai-eki; station number: HS 37) is a train station on the Hanshin Railway Kobe Kosoku Line in Hyōgo-ku, Kobe, Hyōgo Prefecture, Japan. It was the first underground structure not crossing an active fault that has completely collapsed during an earthquake without liquefaction of the surrounding soil and was well-documented.

== Layout ==
The Daikai Station consists of three main sections: the main section of the station, the subway tunnels section and the station access section. The location of the station is made up of 2 meter thick man made fill, around 5 meter thick Holocene alluvial deposits, and several kilometers of Pleistocene deposits.

== History ==
The station opened on 7 April 1968.

Damage to the station was caused by the Great Hanshin earthquake in 1995 in which the station collapsed.

Station numbering was introduced on 1 April 2014.

== Adjacent stations ==
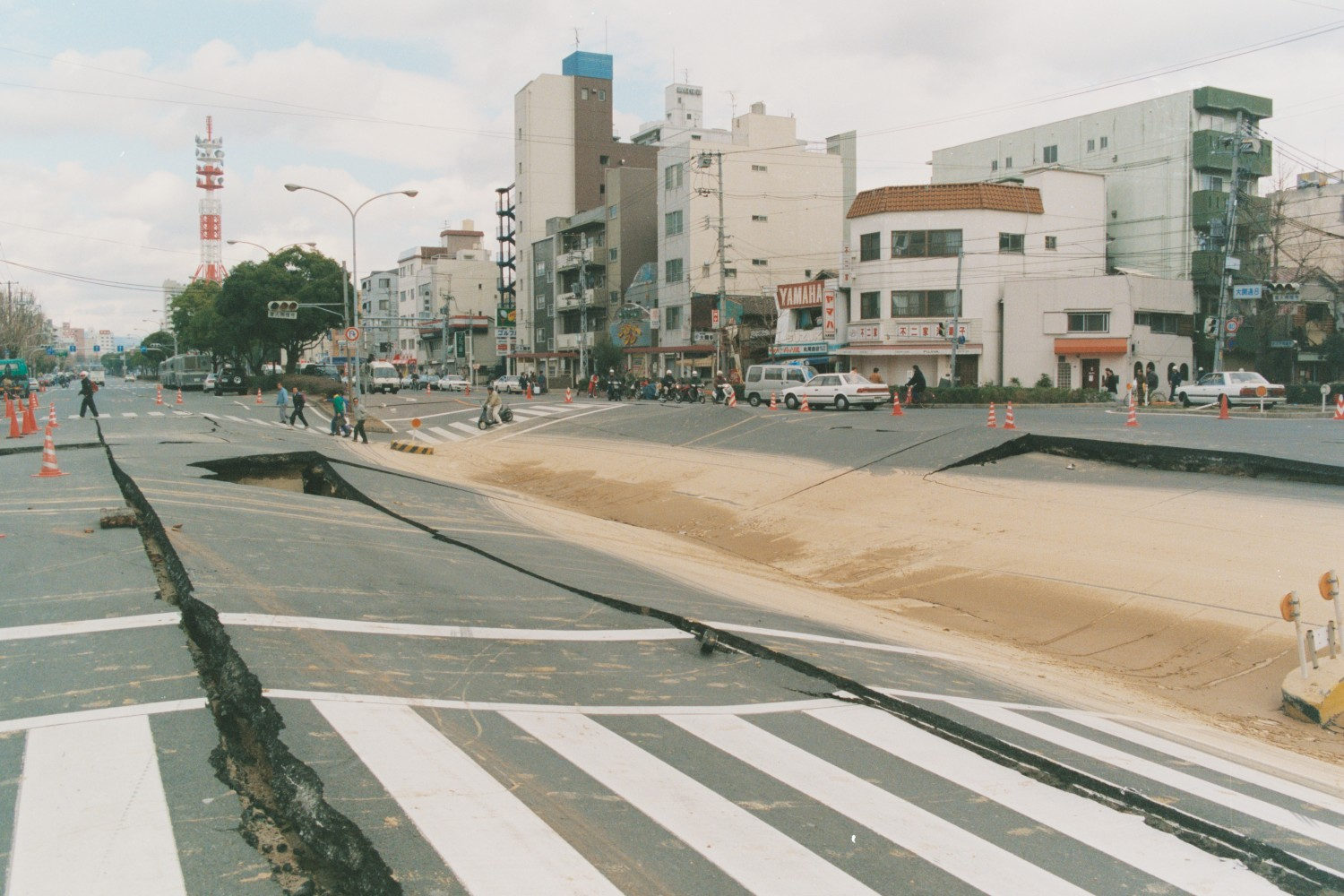
Above-ground view of the damage caused to Daikai Station following the 1995 Kobe earthquake

«	Service	»
Hanshin Railway Kobe Kosoku Line (HS 37)
Shinkaichi (HS 36)	Sanyo Local	Kōsoku Nagata (HS 38)
Shinkaichi (HS 36)	Hanshin Local	Kōsoku Nagata (HS 38)
Shinkaichi (HS 36)	Hanshin Limited Express	Kōsoku Nagata (HS 38)
Shinkaichi (HS 36)	S Limited Express	Kōsoku Nagata (HS 38)
Shinkaichi (HS 36)	Through Limited Express (yellow marking)	Kōsoku Nagata (HS 38)
Through Limited Express (red marking): Does not stop at this station
