= Kōsoku Kōbe Station =

Railway station in Kobe, Japan

Coordinates: 34°40′45.7″N 135°10′27.98″E

Kōsoku Kōbe 高速神戸
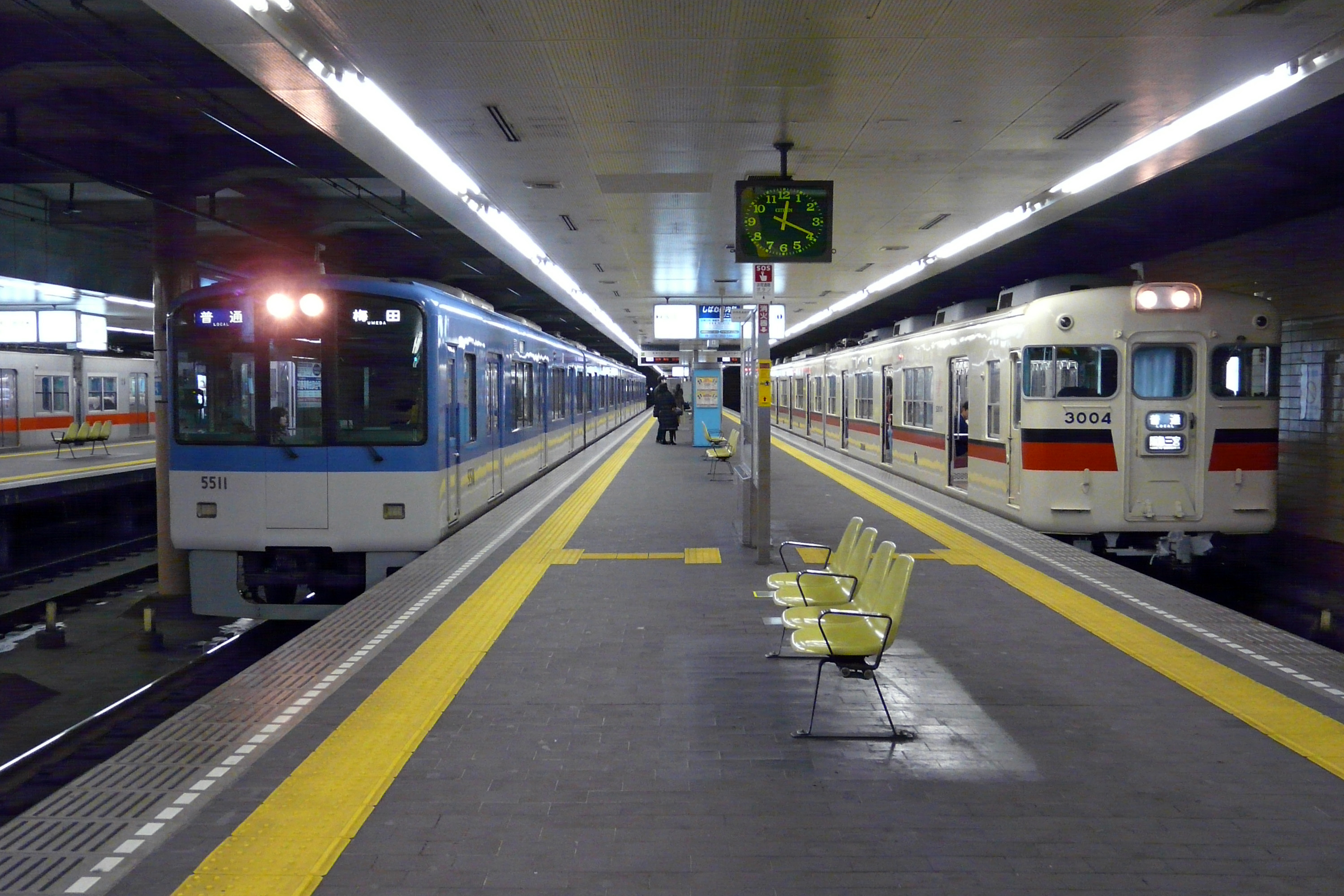
- Trains at Kōsoku Kōbe Station

General information
- Location: Chūō-ku, Kobe, Hyōgo Prefecture; Japan
- Owner: Kobe Rapid Transit Railway
- Manager: Hanshin Railway, Hankyu Railway
- Line: Kobe Kosoku Line
- Platforms: Island platforms
- Connections: West Japan Railway Company JR Kobe Line (Kobe Station); Kobe Municipal Subway Kaigan Line (Harborland Station)

History
- Opened: 7 April 1968
Services
Hanshin Railway Kobe Kosoku Line (HS 35)
Nishi-Motomachi (HS 34)	Hanshin Local	Shinkaichi (HS 36)
Nishi-Motomachi (HS 34)	Sanyo Local	Shinkaichi (HS 36)
Nishi-Motomachi (HS 34)	Rapid Express (3 eastbound trains only, on weekends and holidays)	Shinkaichi (HS 36)
Nishi-Motomachi (HS 34)	Hanshin Limited Express	Shinkaichi (HS 36)
Nishi-Motomachi (HS 34)	Through Limited Express (yellow marking)	Shinkaichi (HS 36)
Motomachi (HS 33)	S Limited Express	Shinkaichi (HS 36)
Motomachi (HS 33)	Through Limited Express (red marking)	Shinkaichi (HS 36)
Hankyū Railway Kobe Kosoku Line (HS 35)
Hanakuma (HK-17)	Hankyu Local	Shinkaichi (HS 36)
Hanakuma (HK-17)	Sanyo Local	Shinkaichi (HS 36)
Hanakuma (HK-17)	Express (only running for Shinkaichi)	Shinkaichi (HS 36)
Hanakuma (HK-17)	Rapid Express	Shinkaichi (HS 36)
Hanakuma (HK-17)	Limited Express; Morning Commutation Limited Express	Shinkaichi (HS 36)
Hanakuma (HK-17)	Limited Express "Atago" (operated during crowded season)	Terminus
Location

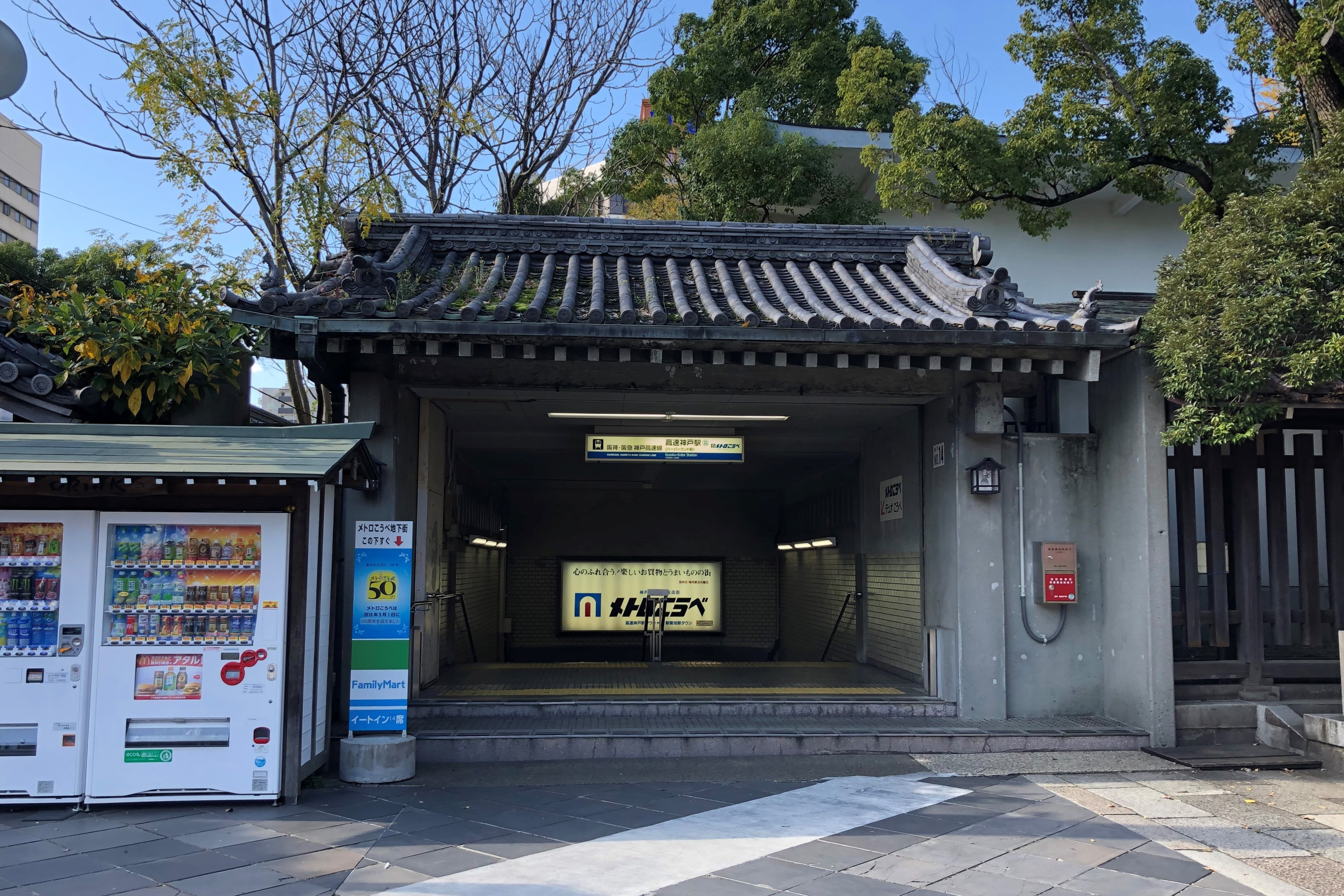
East entrance

Kōsoku Kōbe Station (高速神戸駅, Kōsoku Kōbe-eki; station number: HS 35) is a train station on the Hanshin Railway Kobe Kosoku Line and the Hankyu Railway Kobe Kosoku Line in Chūō-ku, Kobe, Hyōgo Prefecture, Japan.

== Lines ==
- Hanshin Railway Kobe Kosoku Line
- Hankyu Railway Kobe Kosoku Line

Kobe Rapid Transit Railway Co., Ltd. owns the tracks and facilities of those railway lines as "the Tozai Line" of the Category-3 operator, and Hanshin and Hankyu operates trains running on the line as Category-2 operators.

The station is also connected to the following stations via the Duo Kobe underground shopping mall.

- West Japan Railway Company
  - Tokaido Line, Sanyo Line (JR Kobe Line) – Kobe Station
- Kobe Municipal Subway
  - Kaigan Line – Harborland Station

== Layout ==
The station has two island platforms with four tracks underground.

1	■ Hankyu Railway Kobe Kosoku Line	for Kobe-sannomiya, Nishinomiya-kitaguchi and Osaka-umeda; Change to the Imazu Line at Nishinomiya-kitaguchi for Takarazuka and to the Kyoto Line at Juso for Kyoto-kawaramachi
2	■ ■ Hanshin Railway Kobe Kosoku Line	for Sannomiya, Koshien, Amagasaki and Osaka-Umeda; Change to the Hanshin Namba Line at Amagasaki for Osaka Namba and Nara
3	■ ■ Kobe Kosoku Line	from the Hankyu Railway Kobe Line for Shinkaichi from the Hankyu Railway Kobe Kosoku Line for Suma, Akashi and Himeji starting Kosoku Kobe for Suma, Akashi and Himeji; Change to the Shintetsu Line at Shinkaichi for Arima, Sanda and Ao
4	■ ■ Kobe Kosoku Line	from the Hanshin Railway Main Line for Shinkaichi, Suma, Akashi and Himeji; Change to the Shintetsu Line at Shinkaichi for Arima, Sanda and Ao

== History ==
The station opened on 7 April 1968.

Damage to the station was caused by the Great Hanshin earthquake in 1995.

Station numbering was introduced on 1 April 2014.
