= Hanakuma Station =

Railway station in Kobe, Japan

Coordinates: 34°41′10.02″N 135°10′53.5″E

Hanakuma Station 花隈
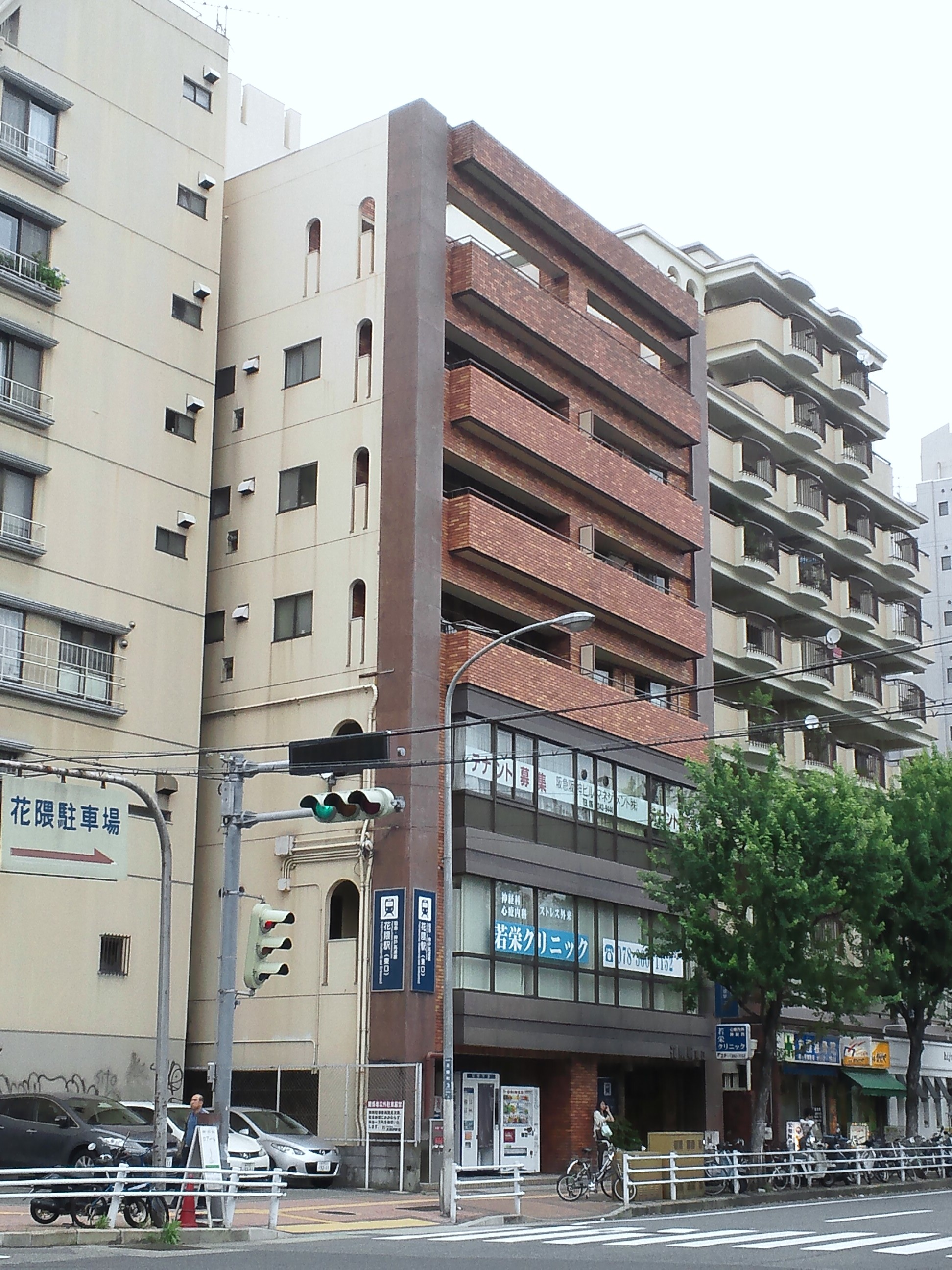
- Apartment building over the station entrance

General information
- Location: 3 Motomachikōkadōri, Chuo, Kobe, Hyōgo （神戸市灘区宮山町三丁目） Japan
- Operator: Hankyu Corporation
- Line: Kobe Main Line
- Connections: Bus terminal

Other information
- Station code: HK-17

History
- Opened: 7 April 1968

Services
Preceding station	Hankyu Railway	Following station
Kobe-Sannomiya HK-16 Terminus	Kobe Kosoku Line	Kōsoku Kōbe HS 35 towards Shinkaichi
Location

Hanakuma Station (花隈駅, Hanakuma-eki; station number: HK-17) is a train station on the Hankyu Railway Kobe Kosoku Line in Chūō-ku, Kobe, Japan.

== Overview ==
=== Layout ===
There are two eight-car-long side platforms at 2nd basement level serving two tracks.

1	■ Kōbe Kōsoku Line	for Kosoku Kobe, Shinkaichi and the Sanyo Railway Main Line (Akashi, Himeji); Change trains at Shinkaichi for the Shintetsu Line
2	■ Kōbe Kōsoku Line	for Kobe-sannomiya, Nishinomiya-kitaguchi and Osaka-umeda; Change to the Imazu Line at Nishinomiya-kitaguchi for Takarazuka, and to the Kyoto Line at Juso for Kyoto-kawaramachi

=== Services ===
Trains run 0455-0020 every day. The typical hourly off-peak weekday service is:

- 8 trains to Kobe-sannomiya, of which:
  - 6 continue to Umeda as limited expresses (Kobe-sannomiya, Okamoto, Shukugawa, Nishinomiya-Kitaguchi, Jūsō, Umeda)
- 8 trains to Shinkaichi, of which:
  - 2 continue to Himeji as locals (alternatively passengers can change at Kōsoku-Kōbe).

== History ==
Hanakuma Station opened on 7 April 1968.

The station was damaged by the Great Hanshin earthquake in January 1995. Restoration work on the Kobe Line took 7 months to complete.

Station numbering was introduced on 21 December 2013, with Hanakuma being designated as station number HK-17.
