= Tōzai Line (Kobe) =

Railway line in Kobe, Hyogo prefecture, Japan

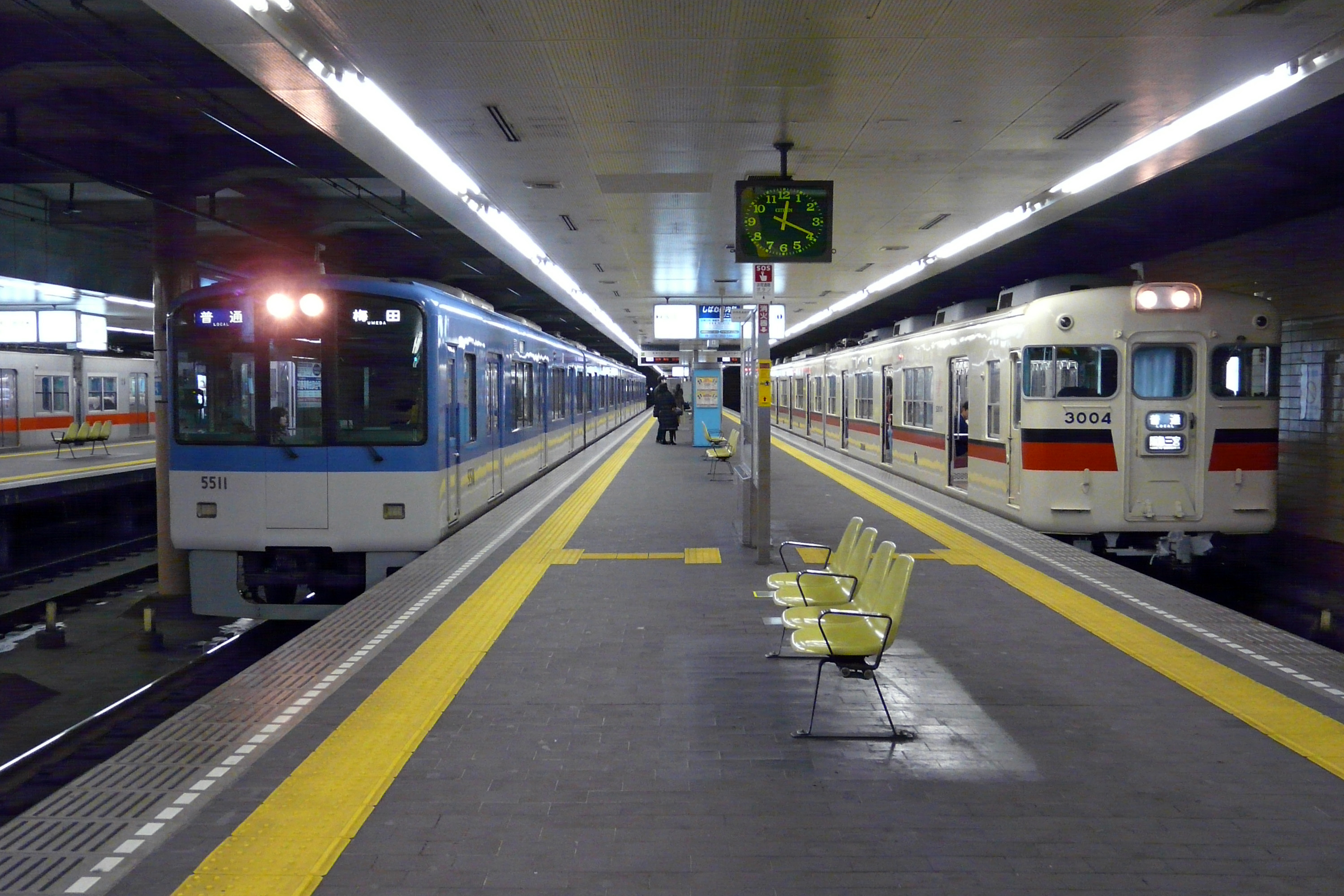

Overview
- Other name: Hanshin Kobe Kosoku Line
- Native name: 阪神神戸高速線
- Owner: Kobe Rapid Transit Railway
- Locale: Kobe, Hyogo Prefecture, Japan
- Termini: Nishidai; Sannomiya Motomachi
- Stations: 7

Service
- Operator(s): Hanshin Electric Railway; Hankyu Electric Railway

History
- Opened: 7 April 1968

Technical
- Line length: 5.0 km (3.1 mi)
- Number of tracks: 2
- Track gauge: 1,435 mm (4 ft 8 1/2 in) standard gauge

The Tozai Line (東西線 Tozai-sen), formally the Hanshin Kobe Kosoku Line (阪神神戸高速線 Hanshin Kōbe Kōsoku sen), is one of three lines of the Kobe Rapid Transit Railway, operated by Hanshin Railway and Hankyu Railway. Trains from Hanshin, Hankyu and Sanyo railways enter this line.

Since the Tozai Line connects three lines, it has three termini: Nishidai in the west, Hankyu Sannomiya and Motomachi in the east. All three were opened in 1968. Tracks from the three termini meet at Kosoku-Kobe. Unlike the Namboku Line, it has standard gauge tracks, 1,435 mm (4 ft 8 1/2 in).

== Stations ==
Legend
- ● : Stops
- ∥ : Does not run through here

Station	Station No.	Japanese	Hankyū Line system	Hanshin Line system	Sanyo Line system	Transfers	Location
From Kobe-Sannomiya: ↑ Through-running to/from Hankyū Kōbe Line ↑ From Motomachi: ↑ Through-running to/from Hanshin Namba Line, Hanshin Main Line, Kintetsu Nara Line ↑
Kobe-Sannomiya	HS 32 HK 16	神戸三宮	●	●	●	Kobe New Transit Port Island Line (P01: Sannomiya Station) Kobe Municipal Subway Seishin-Yamate Line (S03: Kobe-Sannomiya Station) Kobe Municipal Subway Kaigan Line (K01: Sannomiya-Hanadokeimae Station) JR Kobe Line (JR-A61: Sannomiya Station)	
Motomachi	HS 33	元町	∥	●	●	JR Kobe Line (JR-A62: Motomachi Station)	
Nishi-Motomachi	HS 34	西元町	∥	●	●		
Hanakuma	HK 17	花隈	●	∥	∥		
Kōsoku Kōbe	HS 35	高速神戸	●	●	●	Hankyu Kobe Kosoku Line JR Kobe Line (JR-A63: Kobe Station) Kobe Municipal Subway Kaigan Line (K04: Harborland Station)	
Shinkaichi	HS 36	新開地	●	●	●	Kobe Electric Railway Kobe Kosoku Line	
Daikai	HS 37	大開	∥	●	●		
Kōsoku Nagata	HS 38	高速長田	∥	●	●	Kobe Municipal Subway Seishin-Yamate Line (S08: Nagata Station)	
Nishidai	HS 39 SY 01	西代	∥	●	●		
From Nishidai: ↓ Through-running to/from Sanyo Electric Railway Main Line ↓
