= Kōbe Rapid Transit Railway =

Railway company in Kobe, Japan

Kōbe Rapid Transit Railway Co., Ltd.

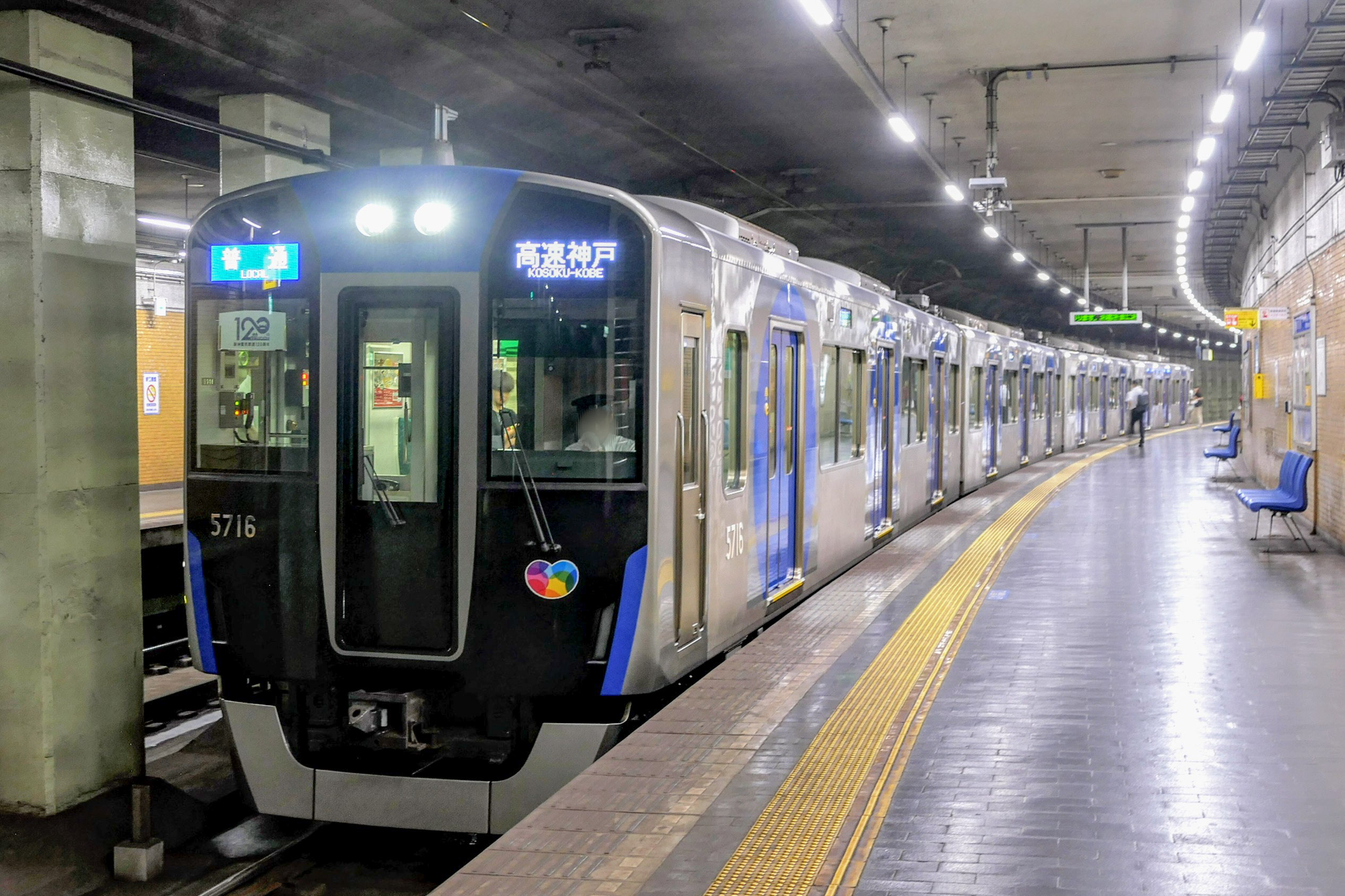
- A Hanshin 5700 series train
- Native name: 神戸高速鉄道株式会社
- Romanized name: Kōbe kōsoku-tetsudō
- Type: Subsidiary (Kabushiki gaisha)
- Industry: Transportation
- Founded: 2 October 1958
- Parent: Hankyu and Hanshin Electric Railway (25.86% each) (Hankyu Hanshin Toho Group)
- Website: Official website

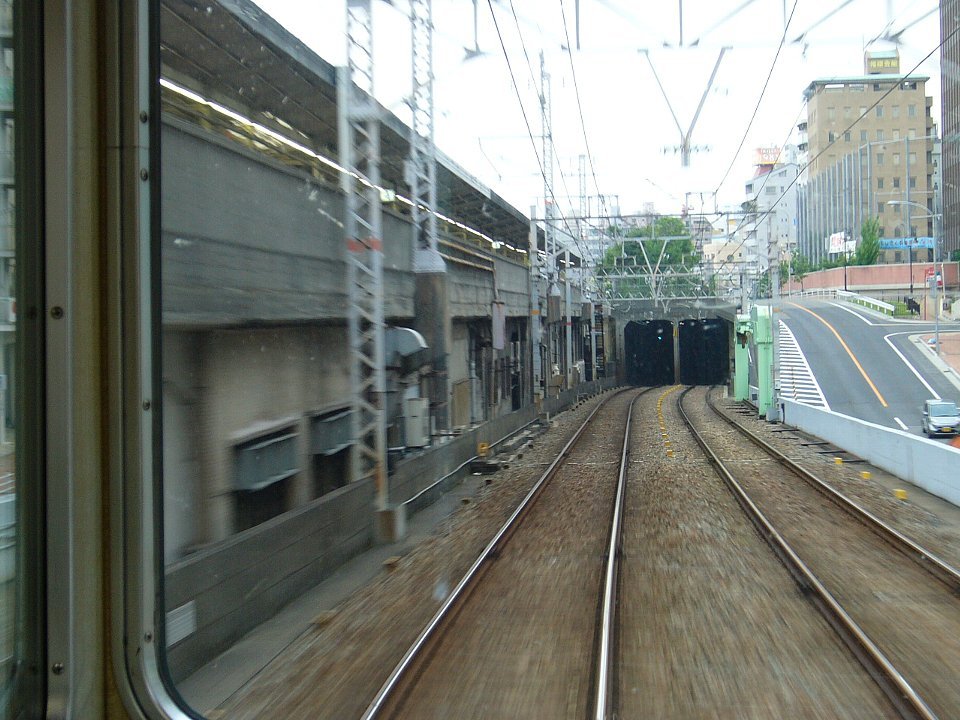
The only overground segment of Kobe Rapid Railway, right after Hankyū-Sannomiya Station.

Kōbe Rapid Transit Railway Company, Limited (Japanese: 神戸高速鉄道株式会社, Hepburn: Kōbe kōsoku-tetsudō) is a railway infrastructure company in central Kobe, Japan.

== Lines ==
Kobe Rapid Railway owns two lines.

- Tozai Line (east-west)
- Namboku Line (north-south)

The Tozai and Namboku lines have been operated since the founding of the railway company while the Hokushin Line is a recent addition to its business. The company is a Category-3 Operator (第三種鉄道事業者, dai-sanshu-tetsudō-jigyōsha) under the 1986 Railway Business Act of Japan in respect to all three lines.

=== Tozai Line and Namboku Line ===
The company does not run its own services on these lines, but provides the necessary infrastructure for four private railway lines (Hankyu Kobe Line (Hankyu), Hanshin Main Line (Hanshin), Shintetsu Arima Line (Shintetsu) and Sanyo Electric Railway Main Line (Sanyo) to be able to run trains through Kobe.

The company operated and administered the stations on the Tozai Line and the Namboku Line (except for Sannomiya Station operated by Hankyu, Motomachi Station operated by Hanshin, Nishidai Station operated by Sanyo and Minatogawa Station operated by Shintetsu) until September 2010, when the operation of the stations on the Tozai Line were transferred to Hanshin and Hankyu, and Shinkaichi Station on the Namboku Line to Shintetsu.

=== Hokushin Line ===
The Hokushin Line was formerly owned by the operator Hokushin Kyuko Electric Railway. When Hokushin Kyuko suffered financial difficulties in 2002, Kobe Rapid Railway purchased the assets of the railway trackage from Hokushin Kyuko.

Unlike the Tozai Line and the Namboku Line stations, the stations of the Hokushin Line are operated and administrated by Hokushin Kyuko (Tanigami Station) and Kobe Municipal Subway (Shin-Kobe Station). On 1 June 2020, the operation of the line was transferred to Kobe Municipal Subway.
