= Motomachi Station (Hyōgo) =

Railway station in Kobe, Japan

Motomachi Station 元町駅
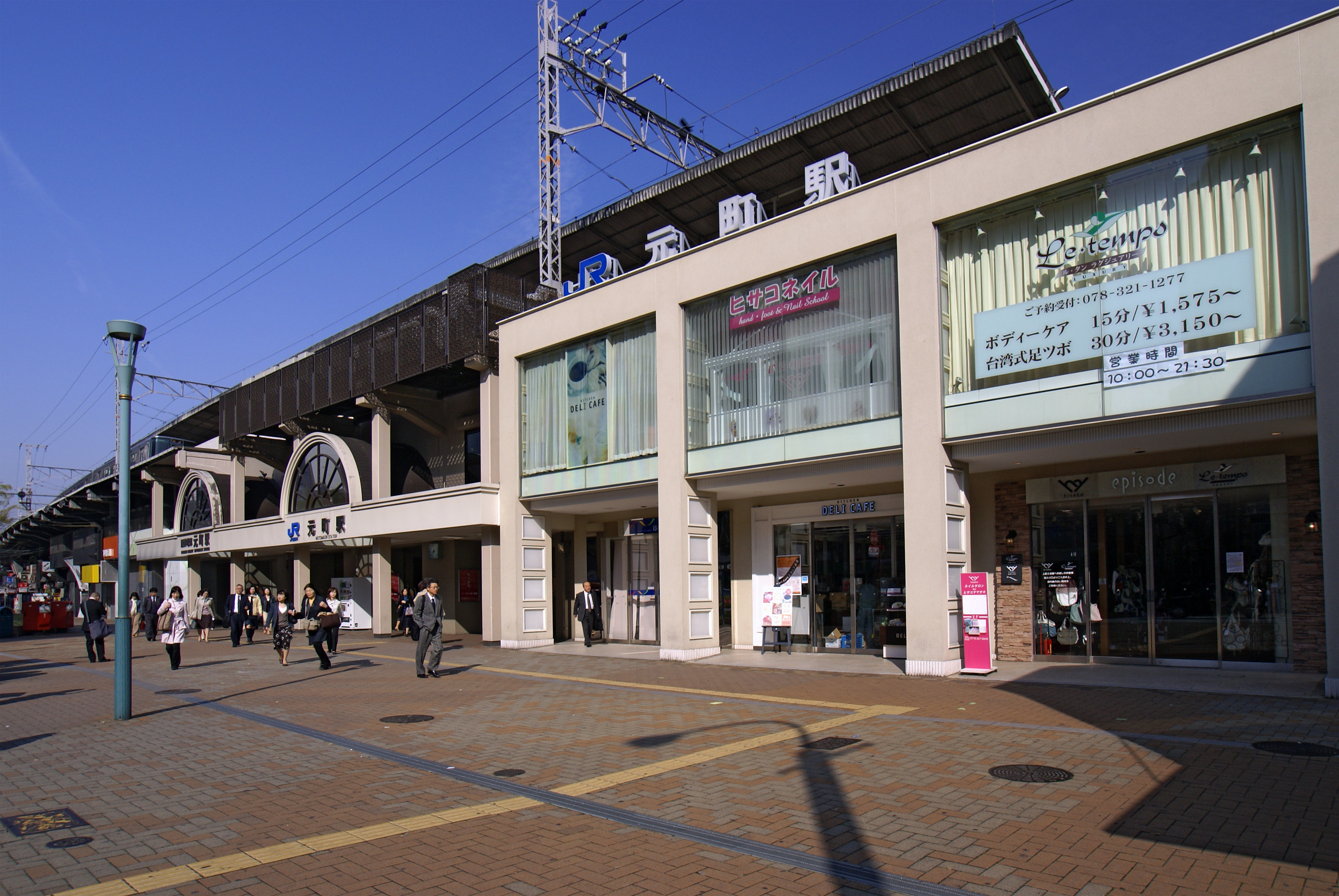
- Facade of the station

General information
- Location: 1-100, Motomachi Kōka-Dōri (JR); 10-2, Motomachi-Dōri 2-chōme (Hanshin); Chūō, Kobe, Hyōgo （神戸市中央区元町高架通1-100 (JR) 神戸市中央区元町通二丁目10-2 (阪神)） Japan
- Coordinates: 34°41′23″N 135°11′15″E
- Operator: JR West; Hanshin Electric Railway
- Lines: JR Kōbe Line (Tōkaidō Main Line); Main Line; Kōbe Kōsoku Line
- Connections: Bus stop

Construction
- Structure type: Elevated (JR West); Underground (Hanshin)
- Accessible: Yes

Other information
- Station code: JR-A62 (JR West); HS 33 (Hanshin)

History
- Opened: 1905

Passengers
- FY 2023: 62,708 daily (JR West); 27,100 daily (Hanshin)
Services
Preceding station	JR West	Following station
Kōbe JR-A63 towards Himeji	JR Kōbe Line Local Rapid Service	Sannomiya JR-A61 towards Ōsaka
Preceding station	Hanshin	Following station
Kobe-Sannomiya HS 32 towards Osaka-Umeda	Main Line Hanshin Local Sanyo Local Rapid Express Hanshin Limited Express Through Limited Express Sanyo S Limited Express Through Limited Express	through to Kobe Kosoku Line
through to Main Line	Kobe Kosoku Line Hanshin Local Sanyo Local Rapid Express Hanshin Limited Express Through Limited Express	Nishi-Motomachi HS 34 towards Nishidai
through to Main Line	Kobe Kosoku Line Sanyo S Limited Express Through Limited Express	Kosoku Kobe HS 35 towards Nishidai
Location

Motomachi Station (元町駅, Motomachi-eki) is a railway station in Motomachi, Chūō-ku, Kobe, Hyōgo Prefecture, Japan.

It is one of the main stations serving the central business district of Kobe. The station is the closest access point to the Motomachi shopping district and to Nanking Town, one of Japan's three largest Chinatown districts.

== Lines ==
- JR West JR Kōbe Line (Tōkaidō Main Line)
- Hanshin Electric Railway Main Line, Kōbe Kōsoku Line

The JR and Hanshin platforms are separated and no interchange is possible without completely leaving one building and entering another; therefore there are technically two separate Motomachi stations, although they are often treated as one.

The JR station is served by local and rapid trains.

The Hanshin station is the western terminus of the Main Line, although service continues west on the Kobe Rapid Railway.

== JR West ==
=== Overview ===
There are 2 elevated island platforms serving 2 tracks each.

1	■ JR Kobe Line	rapid service for Nishi-Akashi and Himeji in the morning and the evening on weekdays
2	■ JR Kobe Line	local trains and rapid service for Nishi-Akashi and Himeji
3	■ JR Kobe Line	local trains and rapid service for Sannomiya, Amagasaki and Osaka local trains for Kitashinchi (JR Tozai Line)
4	■ JR Kobe Line	rapid service for Sannomiya, Amagasaki and Osaka in the morning

== Hanshin Railway ==
=== Overview ===
There is an underground island platform serving 2 tracks.

1	■ ■Main Line	for Koshien, Amagasaki, Osaka-Umeda, Osaka Namba and Nara
2	■ ■Kōbe Kōsoku Line	for Kosoku Kobe, Suma, Akashi, and Himeji

== Gallery ==
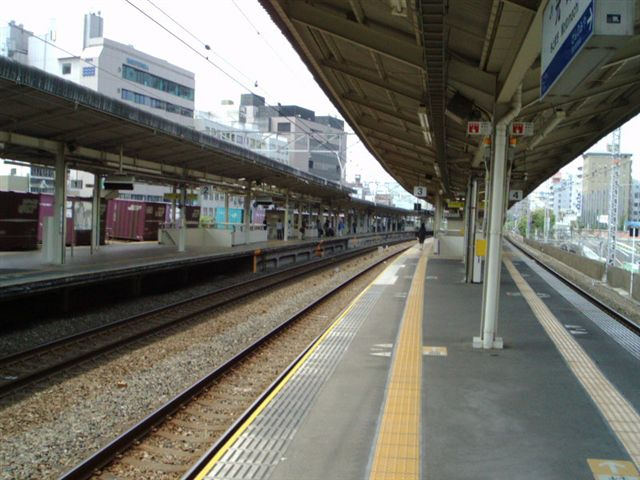
JR platforms at Motomachi; a freight train passes by in the background

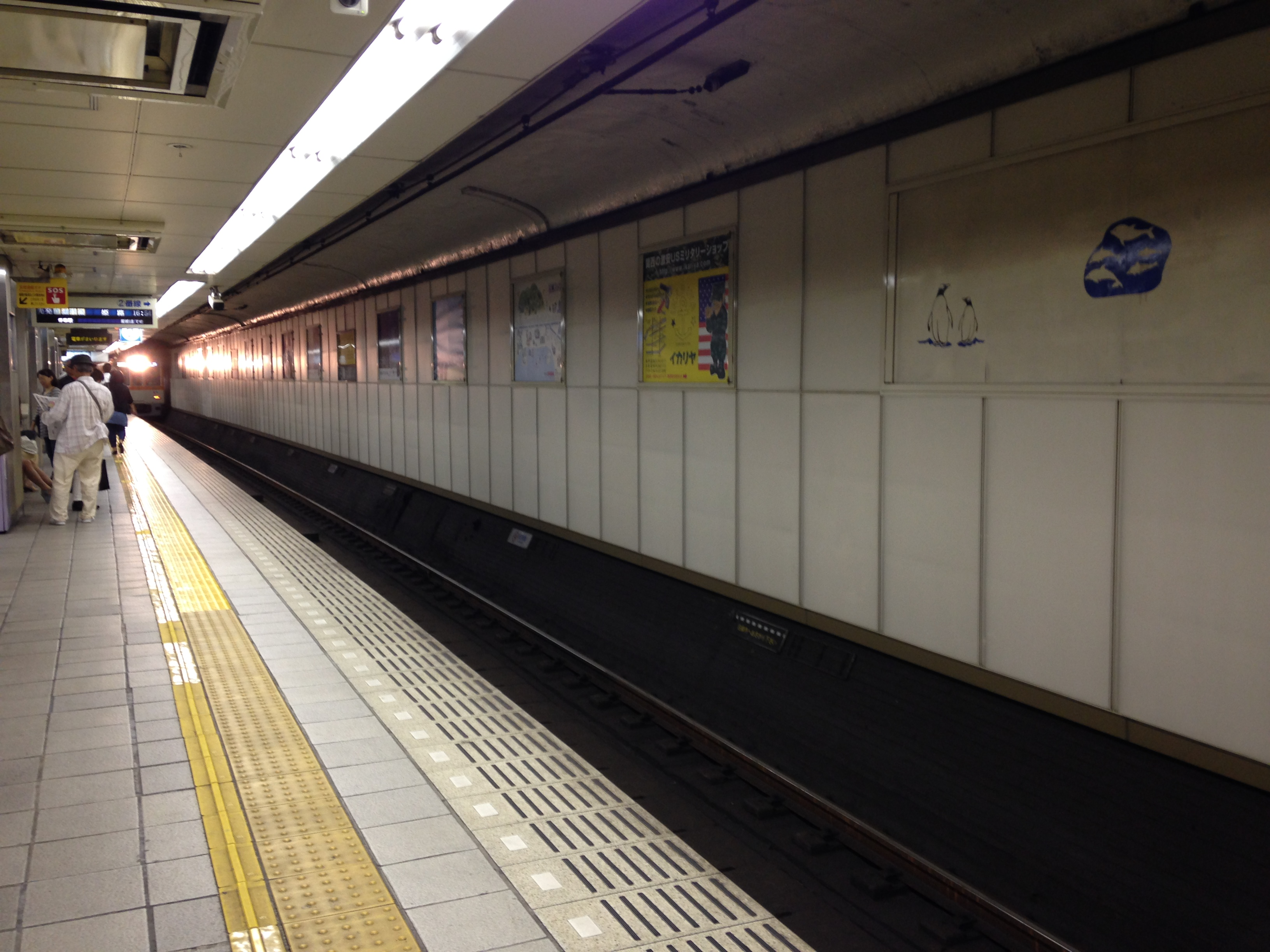
The Hanshin Line platforms are underground

== History ==
Station numbering was introduced to the JR platforms in March 2018 with Motomachi being assigned station number JR-A62.

== Surroundings ==
- Kyūkyoryūchi-Daimarumae Station
- Kenchōmae Station on the Seishin-Yamate Line
