= Kobe-Sannomiya Station =

Railway and metro station in Kobe, Japan

Kobe-Sannomiya Station Sannomiya Station 神戸三宮駅/三宮駅
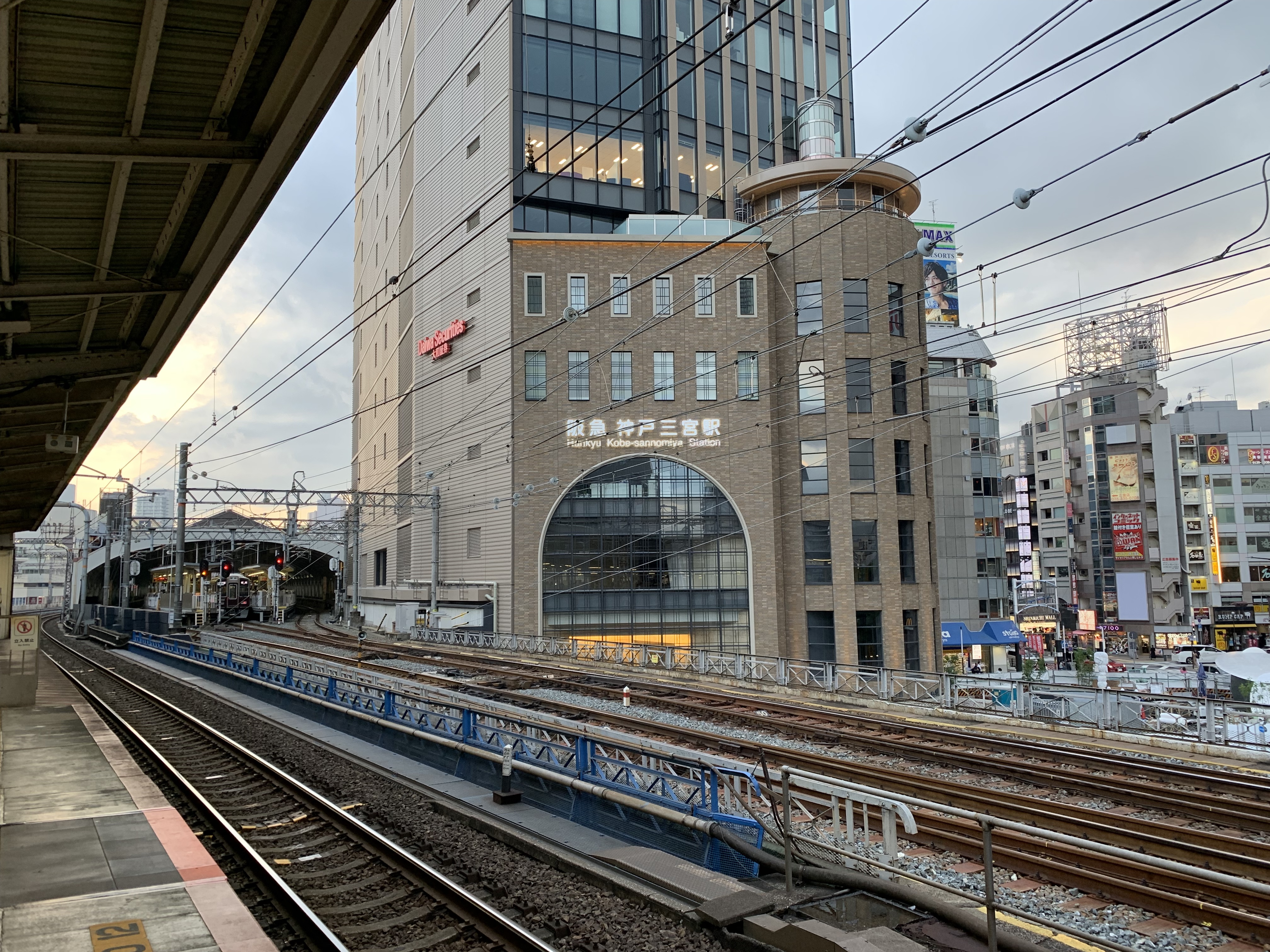
- Hankyu station building and train shed in 2021

General information
- Location: Chūō-ku, Kobe, Hyōgo Prefecture; Japan
- Operator: Hanshin Electric Railway; Hankyu Corporation; Kobe New Transit; Kobe Municipal Subway
- Connections: Bus terminal; Kaigan Line (Sannomiya-Hanadokeimae Station)

Services
Preceding station	Kobe Municipal Subway	Following station
Kenchōmae towards Seishin-Chuo	Seishin-Yamate Line	Shin-Kobe Terminus
Location
- Location within Kobe Location within Hyōgo Prefecture Location within Japan

Kobe-Sannomiya Station (Japanese: 神戸三宮駅, romanized: Kōbe-Sannomiya-eki), or simply Sannomiya Station (三宮駅, Sannomiya-eki), is a major interchange station located in the Sannomiya area in the heart of Kobe, Japan. This station is the main transport hub of Kobe.

== Lines ==
Sannomiya is served by the following railway lines and stations:

- Hanshin Electric Railway (Main Line) - Kobe-Sannomiya Station (Hanshin)
- Hankyu Railway (Kobe Line, Kobe Kosoku Line) - Kobe-Sannomiya Station (Hankyu)
- Kobe New Transit (Port Island Line, K01) - Sannomiya Station (Port Liner)
- Kobe Municipal Subway (Seishin-Yamate Line, S03) - Sannomiya Station (Kobe Municipal Subway)
- Kobe Municipal Subway (Kaigan Line, S03) - Sannomiya-Hanadokeimae Station
- JR West - Sannomiya Station

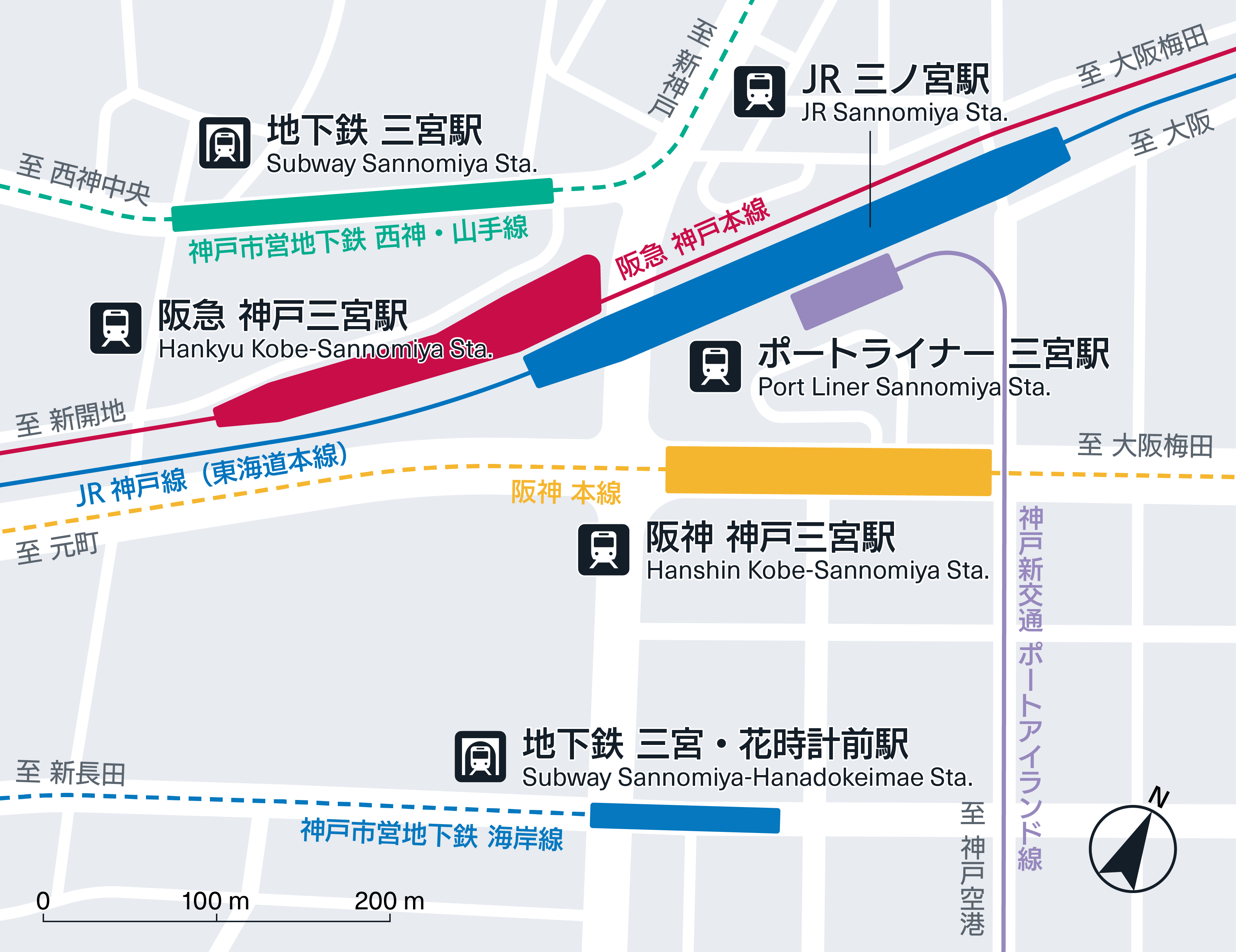
Location of the six stations at Sannomiya

== Hanshin Railway Main Line ==
Kobe-Sannomiya Station 神戸三宮駅
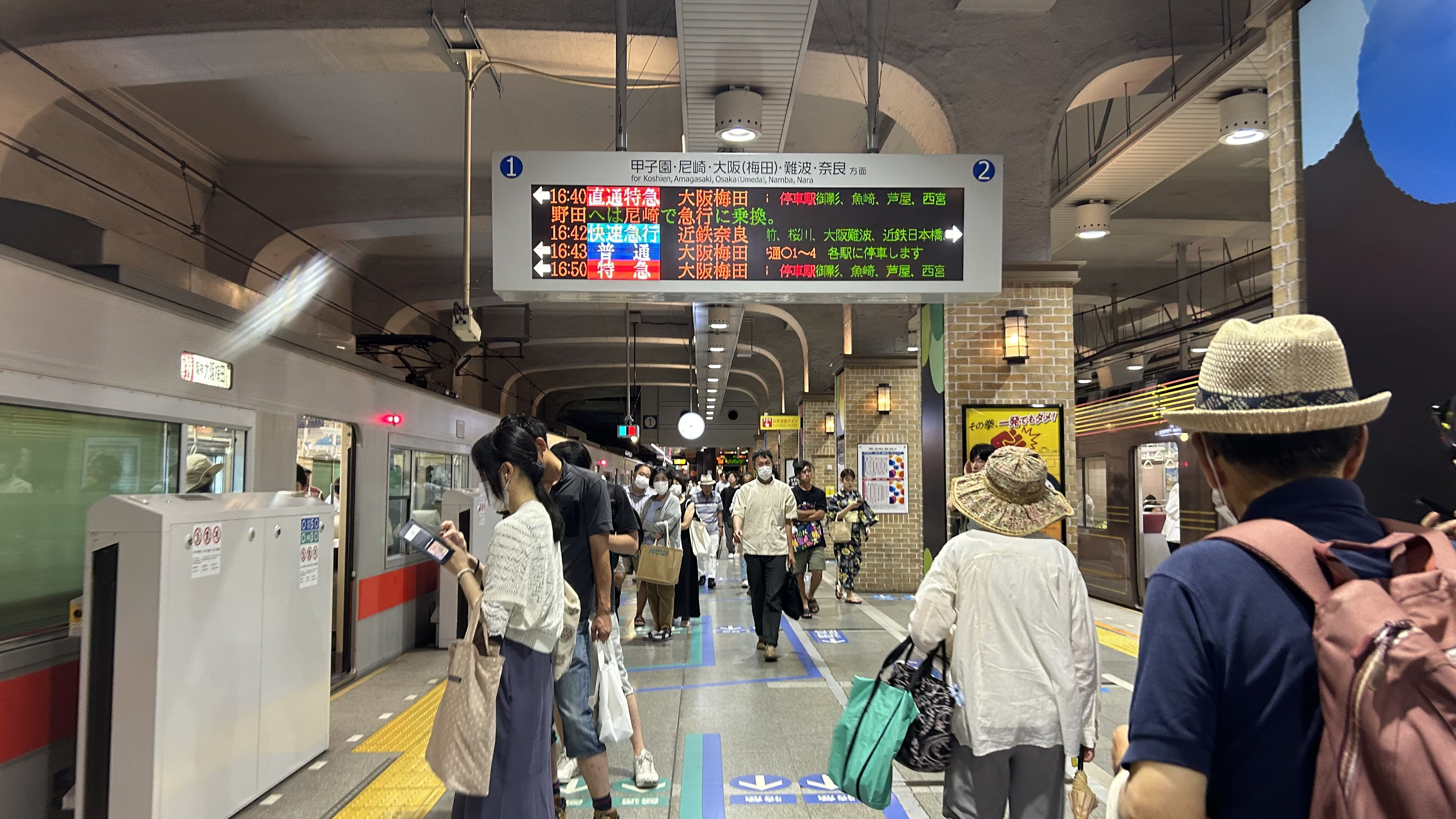
- Platforms 1 and 2 in August 2024

General information
- Location: 1-8, Onoe-dōri Hatchōme, Chūō-ku, Kobe, Hyōgo Prefecture; Japan
- Coordinates: 34°41′35.42″N 135°11′43.98″E
- System: Hanshin Railway station
- Operator: Hanshin Electric Railway
- Line: Hanshin Main Line

Other information
- Station code: HS 32

History
- Opened: 12 April 1905
- Former names: Kōbe Kumoi-dōri; Kōbe (until 1936)
Services
Hanshin Electric Railway Main Line (HS 32)
Kasuganomichi (HS 31)	Hanshin Local	Motomachi (HS 33)
Terminus	Sanyo Local	Motomachi (HS 33)
Uozaki (HS 23)	Rapid Express	Motomachi (HS 33) (3 eastbound trains only, on weedends and holidays)
Mikage (HS 25)	Limited Express	Motomachi (HS 33)
Terminus	Sanyo S Limited Express	Motomachi (HS 33)
Location

=== Overview ===
The current station opened as Kobe Station on 12 April 1905. The station would undergo several name changes until the current name was introduced in 2013 along with the station number (HS 32).

In 1987, platform 3 was extended and a new ticket gate was opened on the north side.

The station was damaged by the Great Hanshin earthquake on 17 January 1995 and all services were suspended. Service was temporarily restored between this station and Kōsoku Kōbe on 1 February 1995, and full restoration of Hanshin Line services would be achieved on 26 June 1995.

=== Layout ===
This station has a combination bay/island platform serving three tracks below ground level. Tracks 1 and 3 are for through-trains running between Umeda and Sanyo-Himeji, while track 2 is for trains headed to Ōsaka Namba and Kintetsu Nara.

1	■ ■Main Line	for Koshien, Amagasaki and Osaka (Umeda) from Shinkaichi for Osaka (Namba) and Nara (weekends and holidays)
2	■ ■Main Line	returning for Koshien, Amagasaki, Osaka (Umeda, Namba) and Nara
(2)	■ ■Main Line	for getting off
3	■ ■Main Line	for Motomachi, Kosoku Kobe, Shinkaichi, Suma, Akashi and Himeji

=== Gallery ===
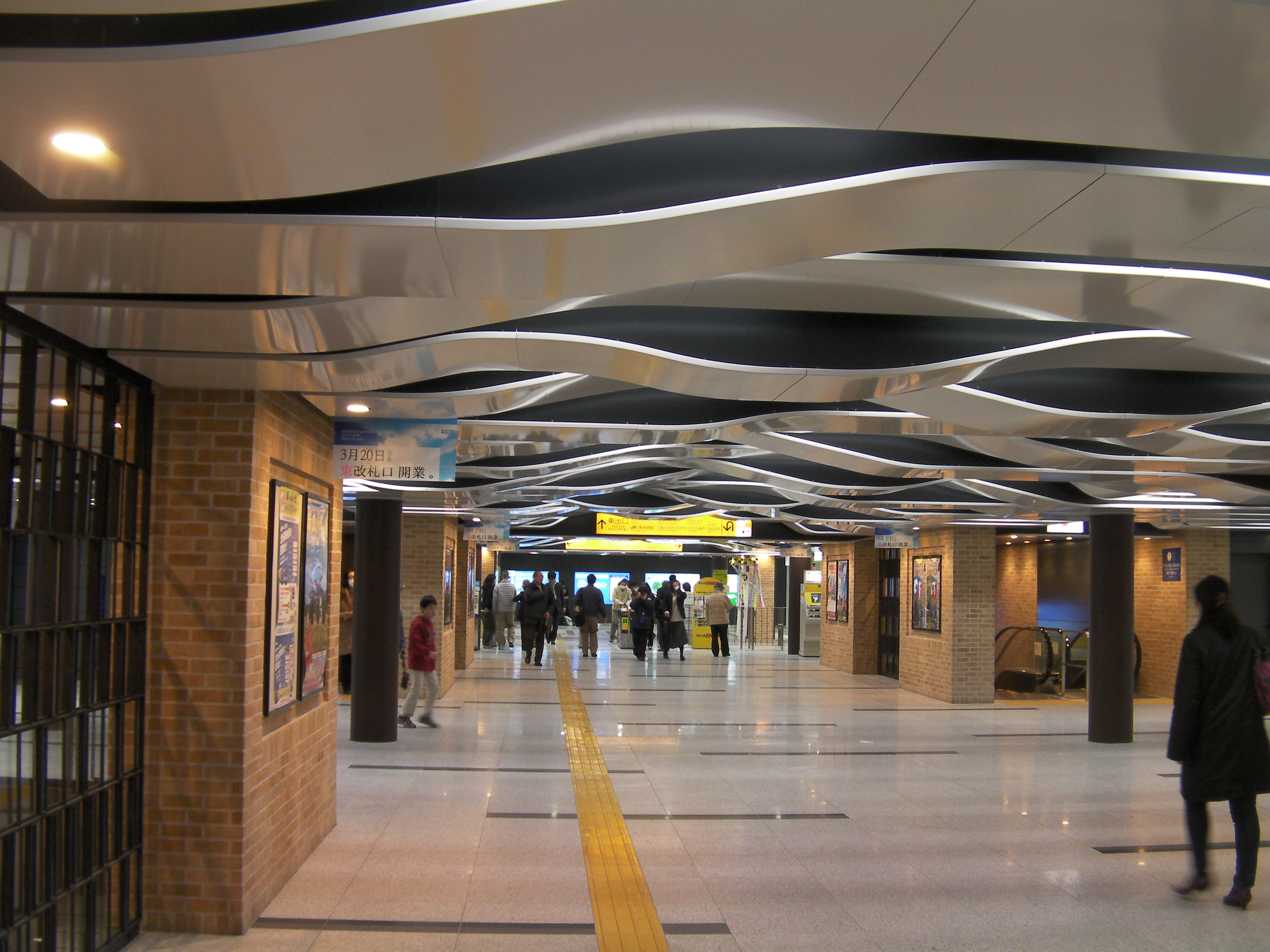
East concourse, in 2012

== Hankyu Railway Kobe Line, Kobe Kosoku Line ==
Kobe Sannomiya Station 神戸三宮駅
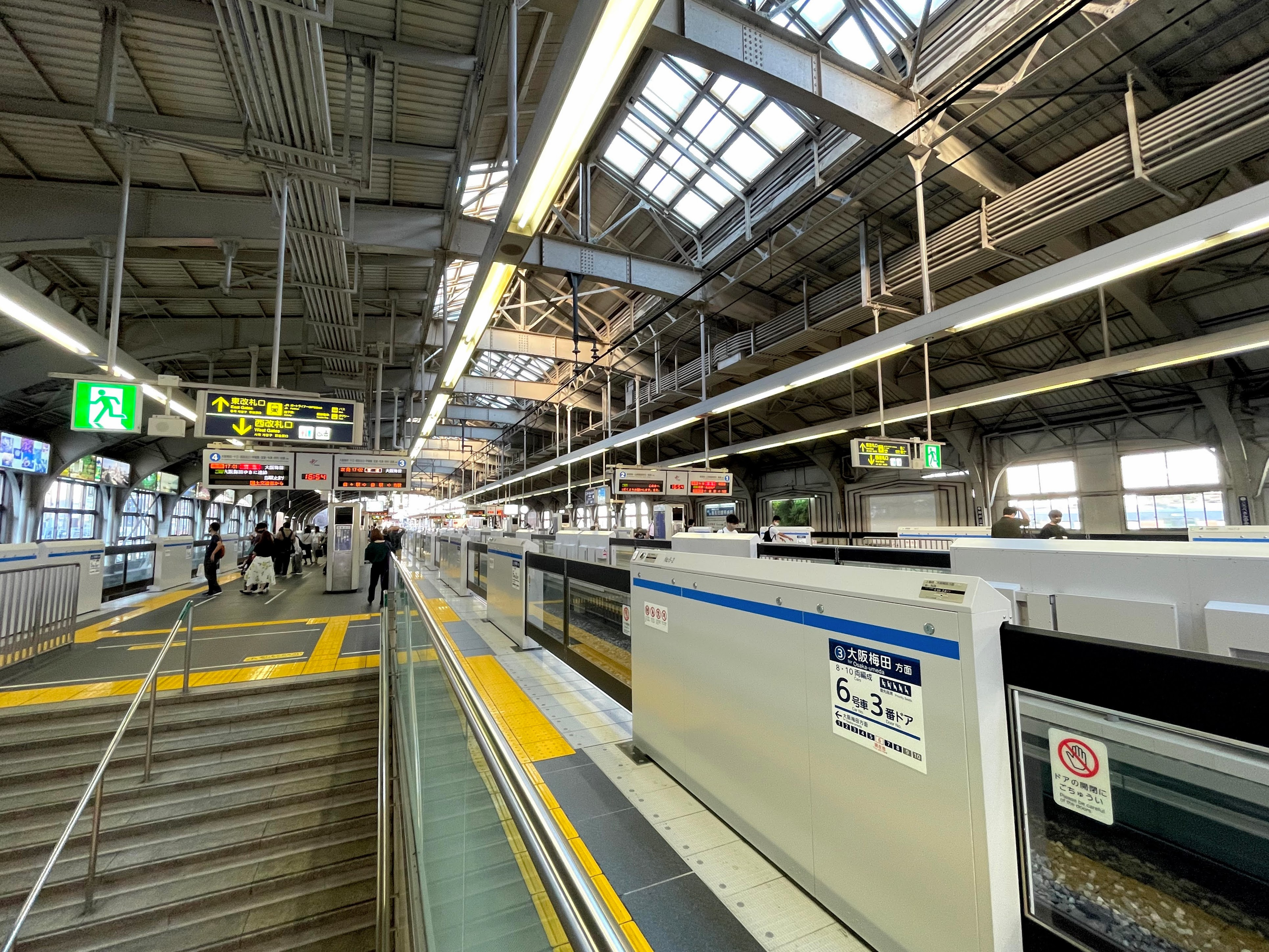

General information
- Location: Kanōchō Yonchōme, Chūō-ku, Kobe, Hyōgo Prefecture; Japan
- Coordinates: 34°41′35.41″N 135°11′34.37″E
- System: Hankyu Railway station
- Operator: Hankyu Corporation
- Lines: Hankyu Kobe Main Line; Kobe Kosoku Line

Other information
- Station code: HK-16

History
- Opened: 1936
- Former names: Kōbe; Sannomiya (until 2013)
Services
Hankyu Railway Kobe Line, Kobe Kosoku Line (HK-16)
Kasuganomichi (Kobe Line, HK-15)	Hankyu Local	Hanakuma (Kobe Kosoku Line, HK-17)
Terminus	Sanyo Local	Hanakuma (Kobe Kosoku Line, HK-17)
Kasuganomichi (Kobe Line, HK-15)	Commutation Express	Terminus
Kasuganomichi (Kobe Line, HK-15)	Express	Hanakuma (Kobe Kosoku Line, HK-17)
Rokkō (Kobe Line, HK-13)	Rapid Express	Hanakuma (Kobe Kosoku Line, HK-17)
Rokkō (Kobe Line, HK-13)	Limited Express "Atago" (Kosoku Kobe - Arashiyama) (operated during crowded season)	Hanakuma (Kobe Kosoku Line, HK-17)
Okamoto (Kobe Line, HK-11)	Limited Express; Commutation Limited Express	Hanakuma (Kobe Kosoku Line, HK-17)
Location

=== Overview ===
Hankyu Railway’s station was established in 1936, and as its terminal within the city, was initially referred to as “Kobe”.

The original station building was noted for its Art Deco architecture and a grand arch through which trains passed on their approach to the station; this was damaged beyond repair in the 1995 Hanshin-Awaji Earthquake and was replaced by a temporary structure, which remained in use until 2020. A new high-rise building is now under construction, mimicking the design of the original station building, but lacking the arch over the tracks.

=== Layout ===
This station has two island platforms with three tracks elevated close to JR Sannomiya Station.

1	■ Kobe Kosoku Line	(Line 1) for Shinkaichi and the Sanyo Railway Main Line (Akashi, Himeji)
2	■ Kobe Kosoku Line	(Line 2) for Shinkaichi and the Sanyo Railway Main Line (Akashi, Himeji) only used for terminating trains
3	■ Kobe Line	(Line 2) for Nishinomiya-Kitaguchi, Osaka (Umeda), Takarazuka, Imazu, Kyoto and Kita-Senri
4	■ Kobe Line	(Line 3) for Nishinomiya-Kitaguchi, Osaka (Umeda), Takarazuka, Imazu, Kyoto and Kita-Senri

=== Gallery ===
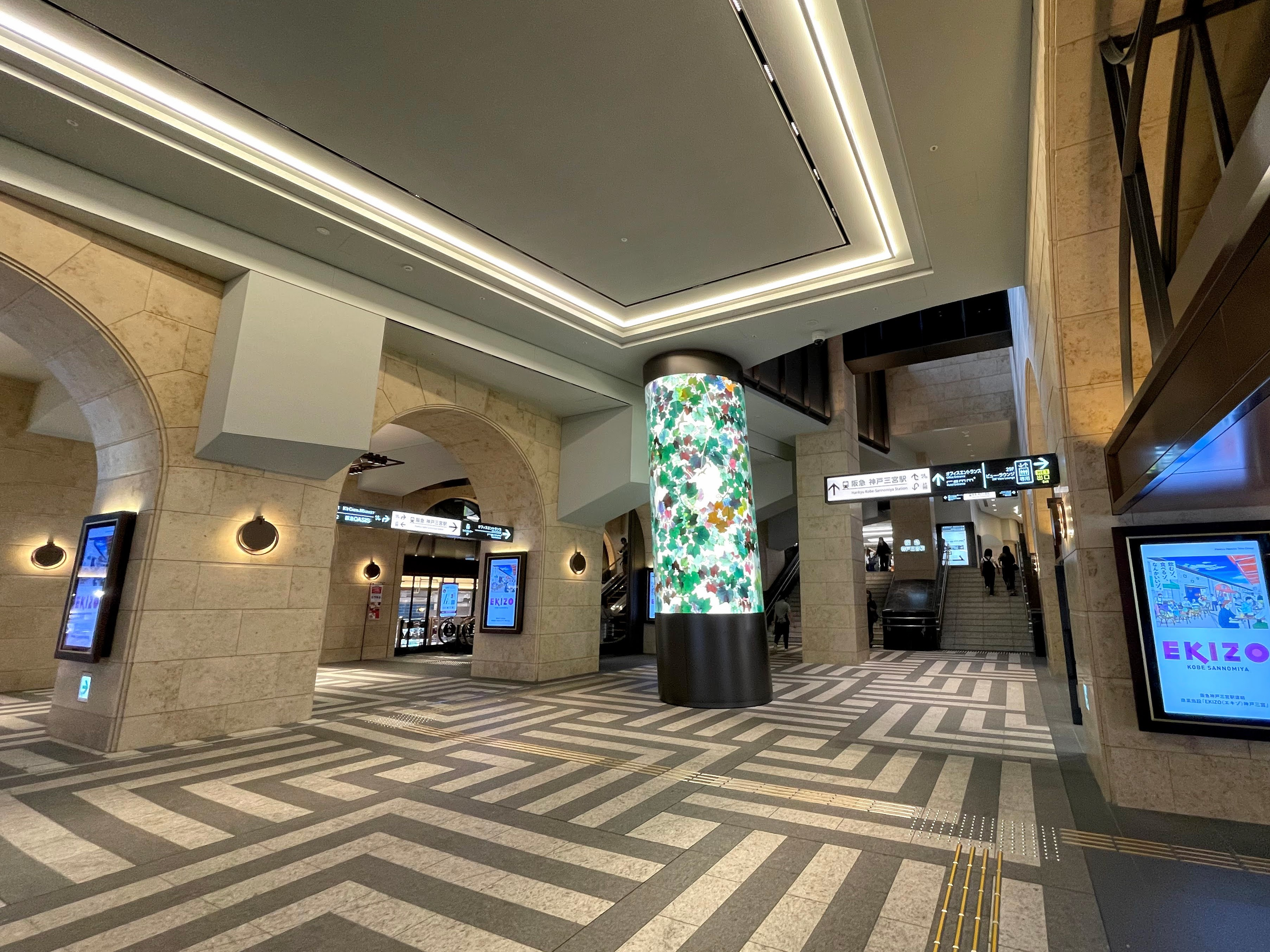
East concourse, in 2021

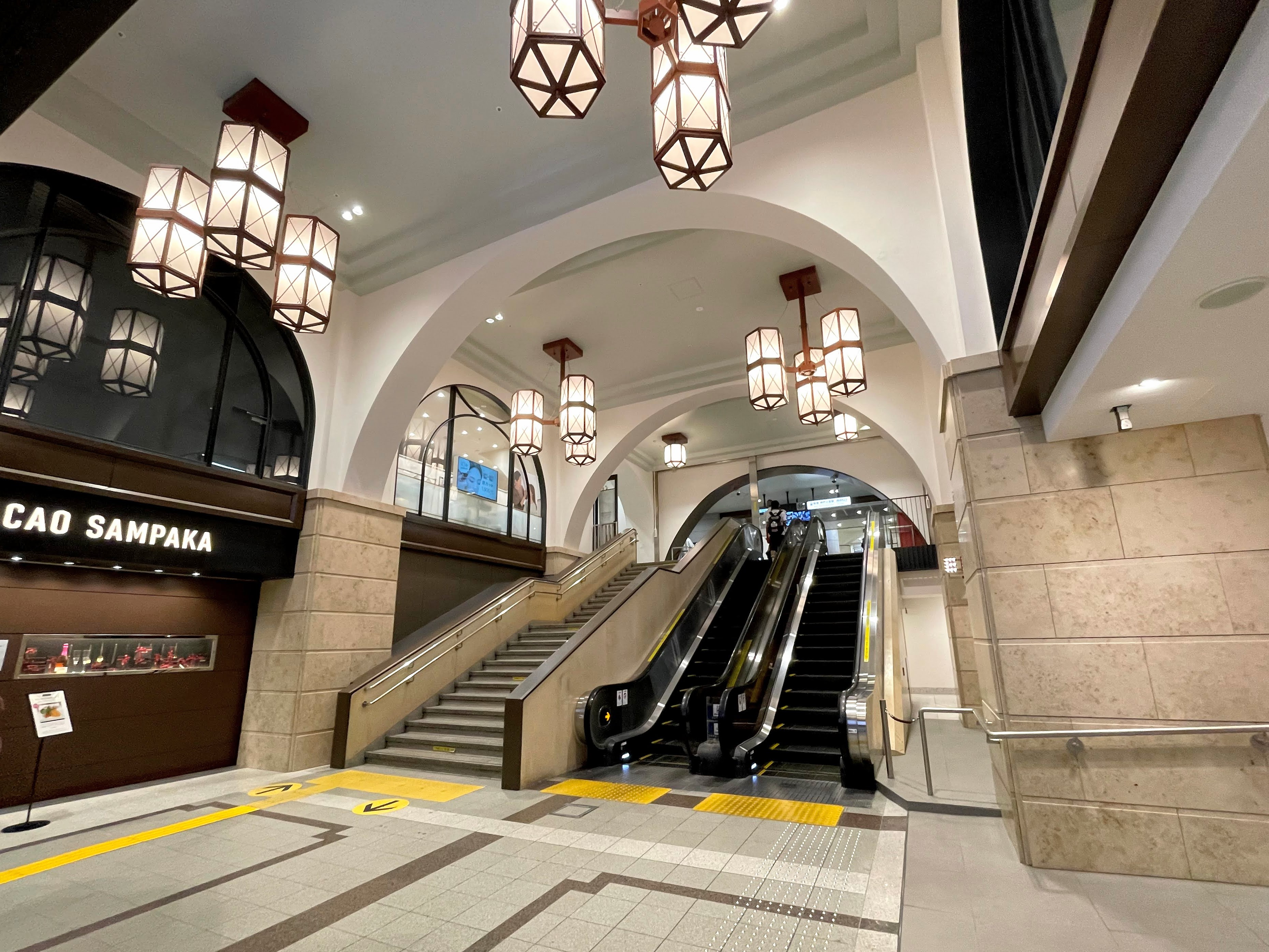
West concourse, in 2021

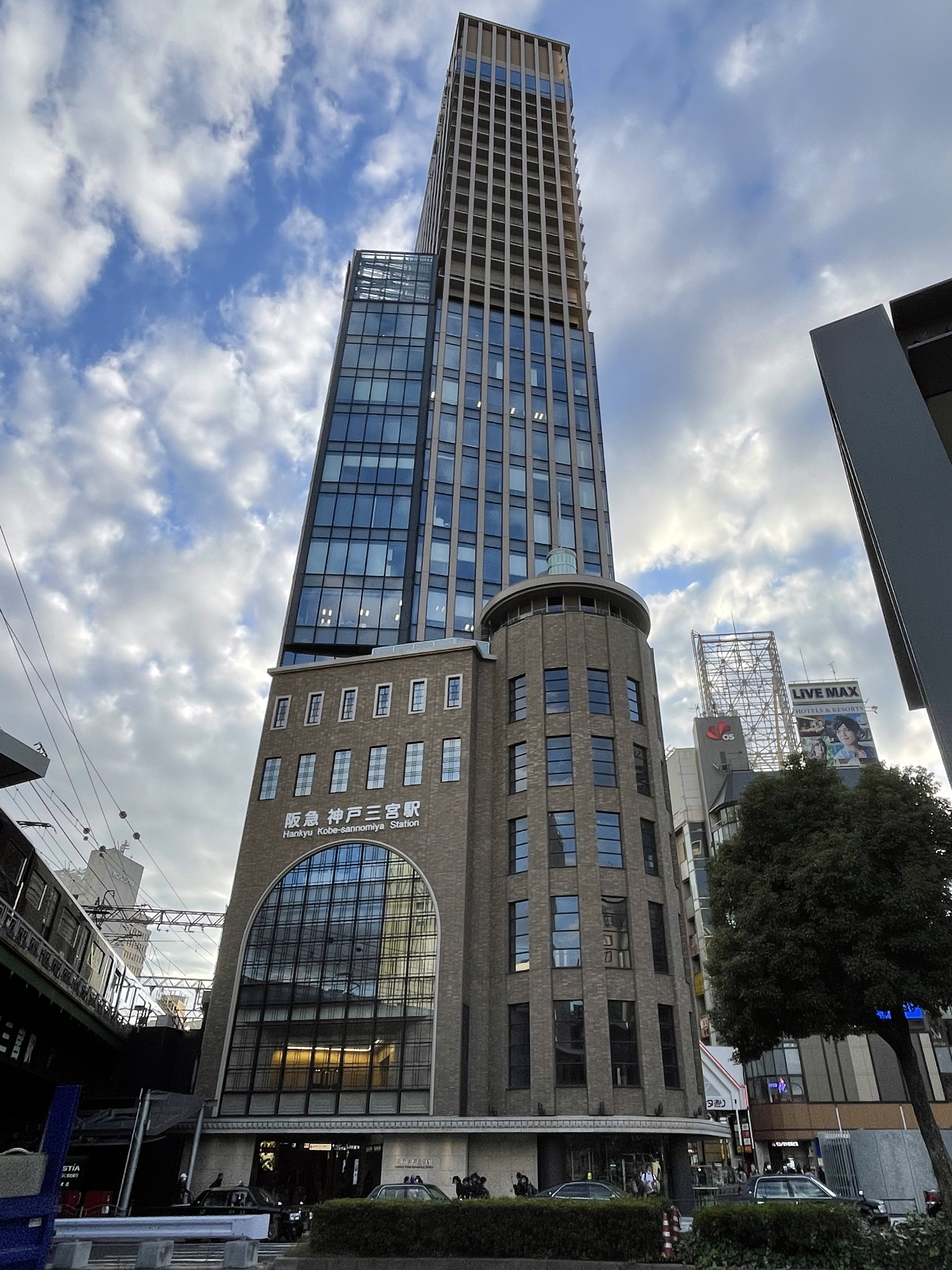
Station building, in 2022

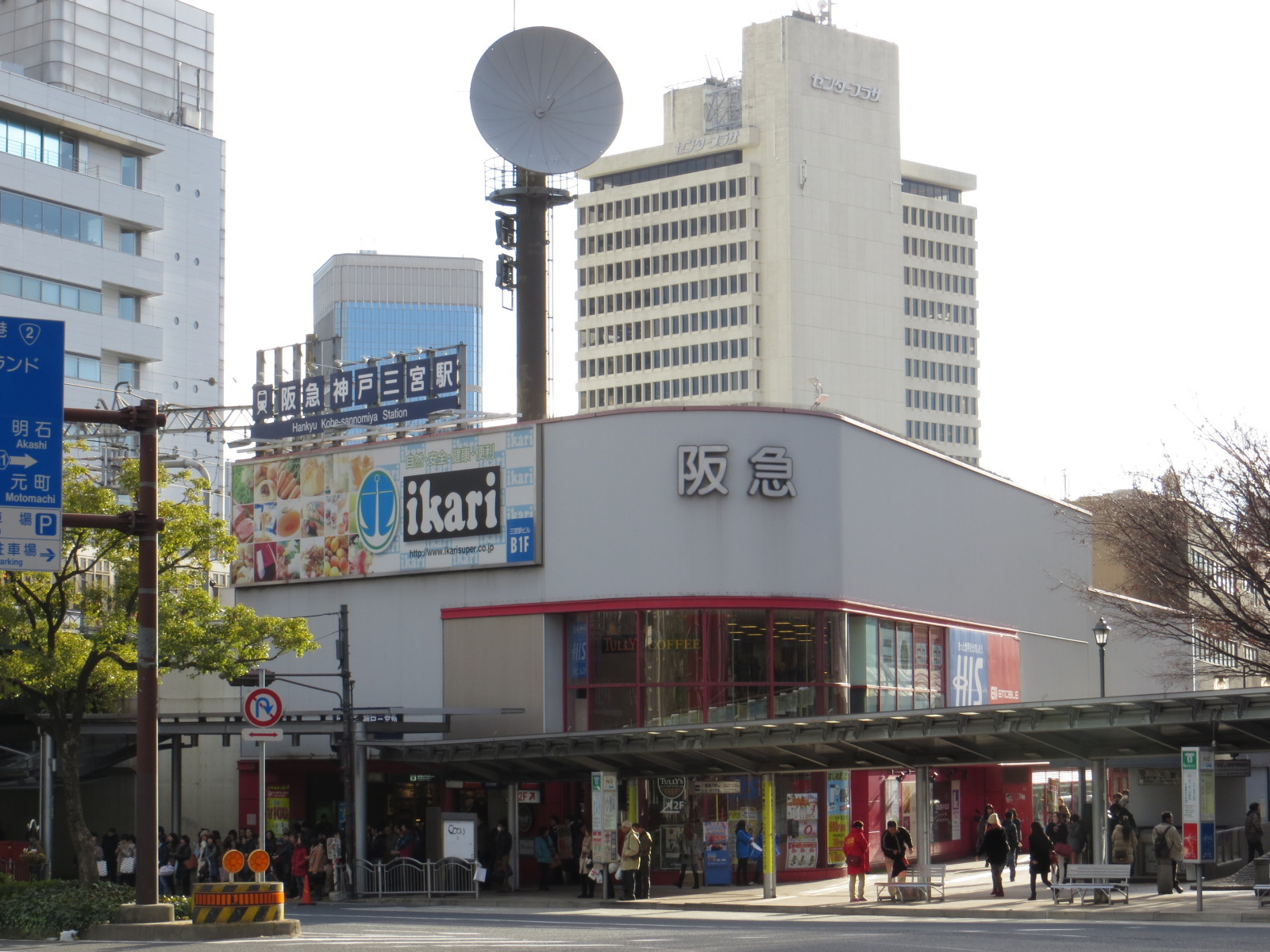
Temporary building (1995–2016), in 2014

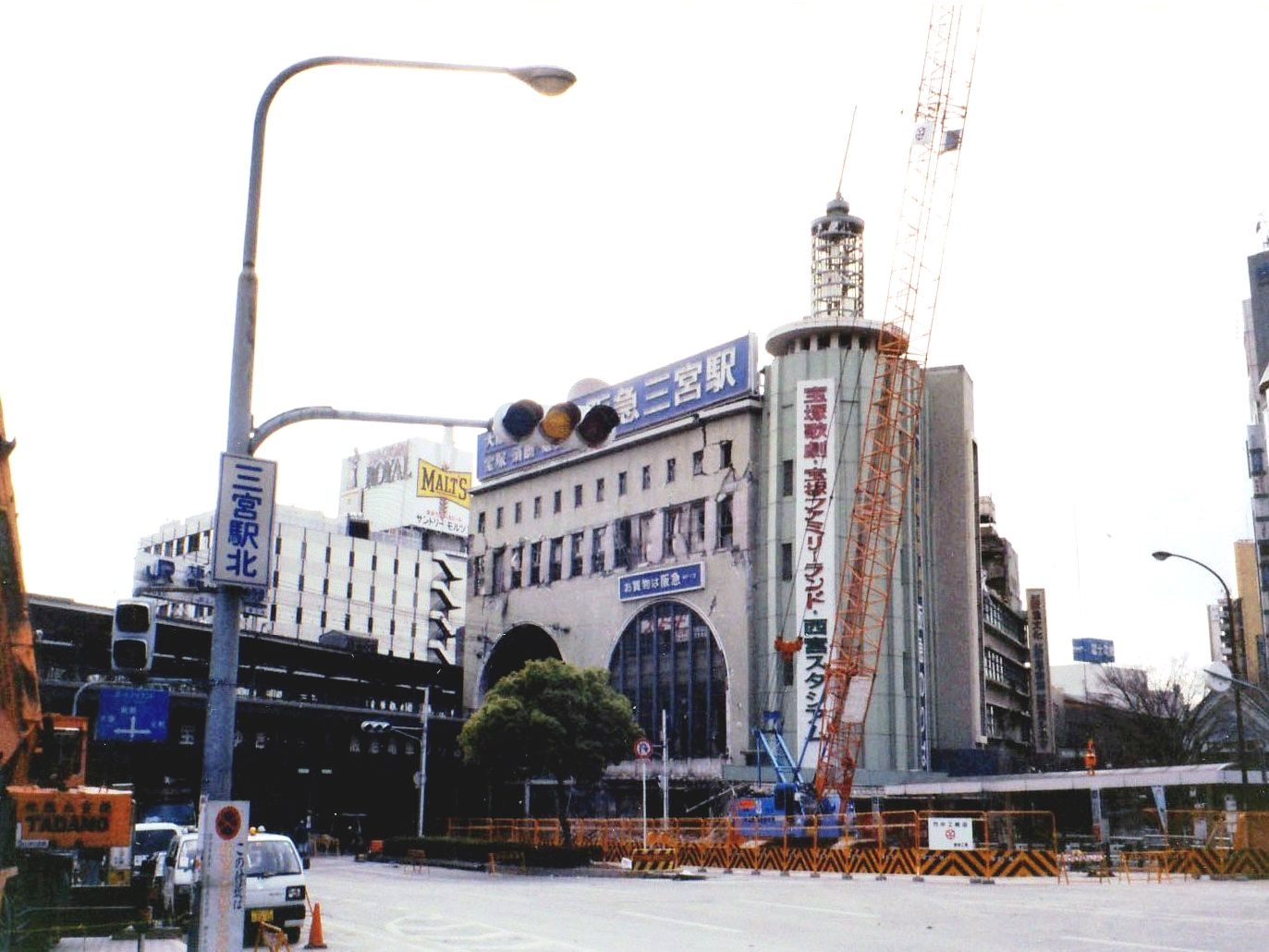
Original building damaged by earthquake, in 1995

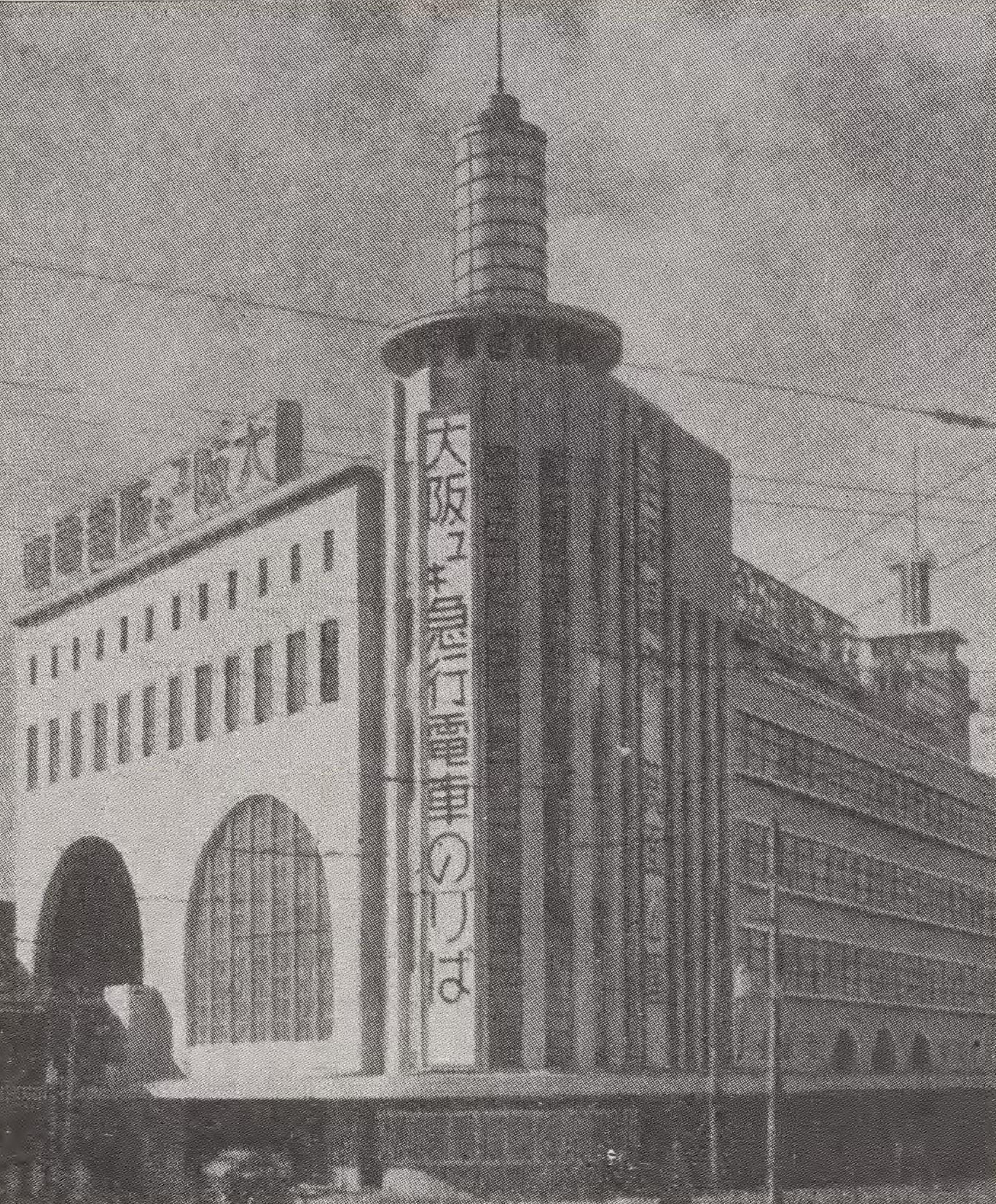
Original building

== Kobe Municipal Subway Seishin-Yamate Line ==
Sannomiya Station 三宮駅
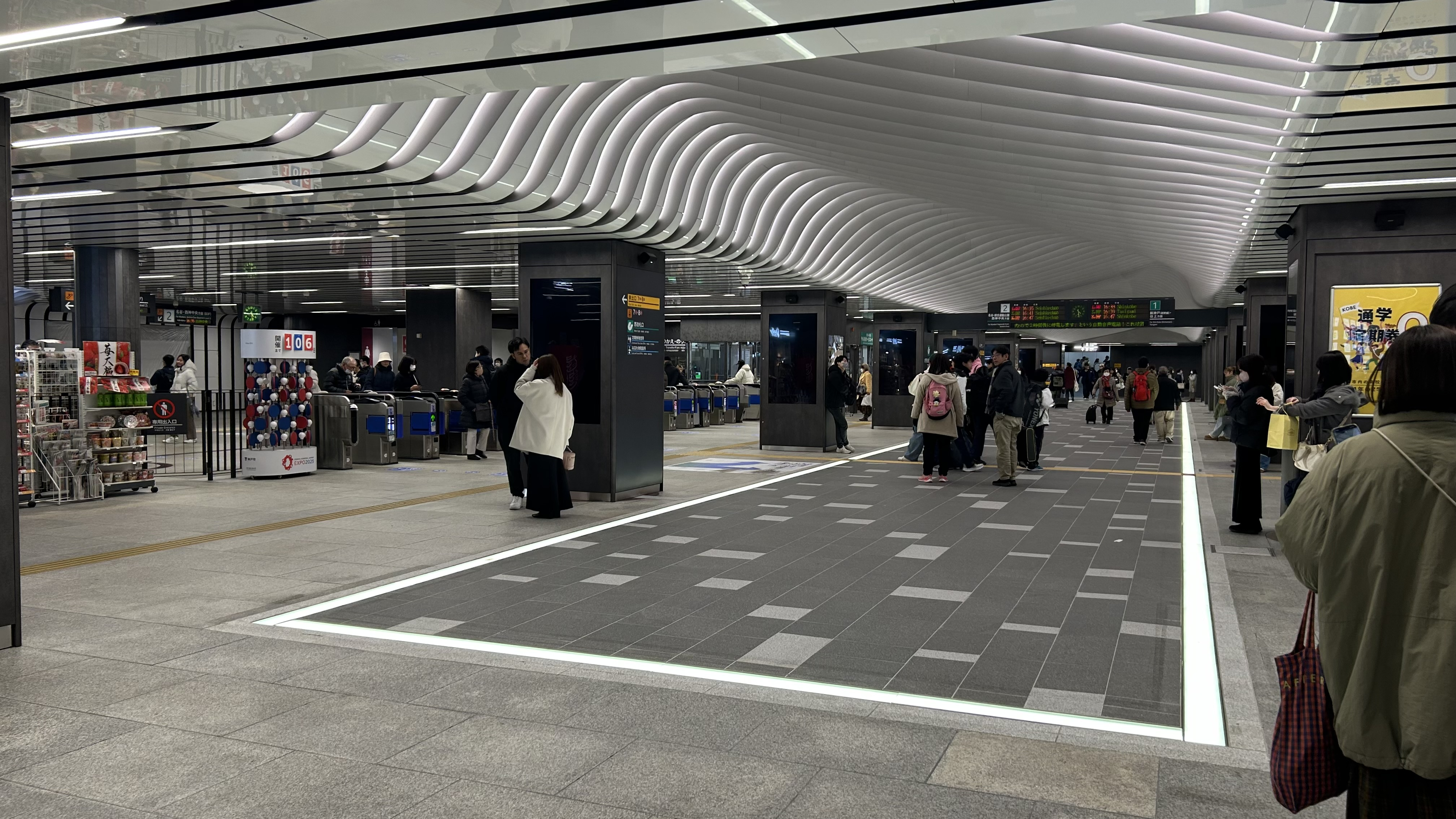
- East concourse (December 2024)

General information
- Location: Kitanagasa-dōri Itchōme, Chūō-ku, Kobe, Hyōgo Prefecture; Japan
- Coordinates: 34°41′40.5″N 135°11′37.51″E
- System: Kobe Municipal Subway station
- Operator: Kobe Municipal Transportation Bureau
- Line: Seishin-Yamate Line
- Platforms: 2 side platforms (1 on each level)
- Tracks: 2 (1 on each level)
- Connections: Kaigan Line at Sannomiya-Hanadokeimae

Other information
- Station code: S03

History
- Opened: 1985

Services
Preceding station	Kobe Municipal Subway	Following station
Kenchōmae towards Seishin-Chuo	Seishin-Yamate Line	Shin-Kobe Terminus
Location

=== Layout ===
This station has a side platform serving a track on the second basement and the third basement.

1	■ Seishin-Yamate Line	(second basement) for Shin-Kobe and Tanigami
2	■ Seishin-Yamate Line	(third basement) for Shin-Nagata, Myōdani and Seishin-Chuo

=== Gallery ===
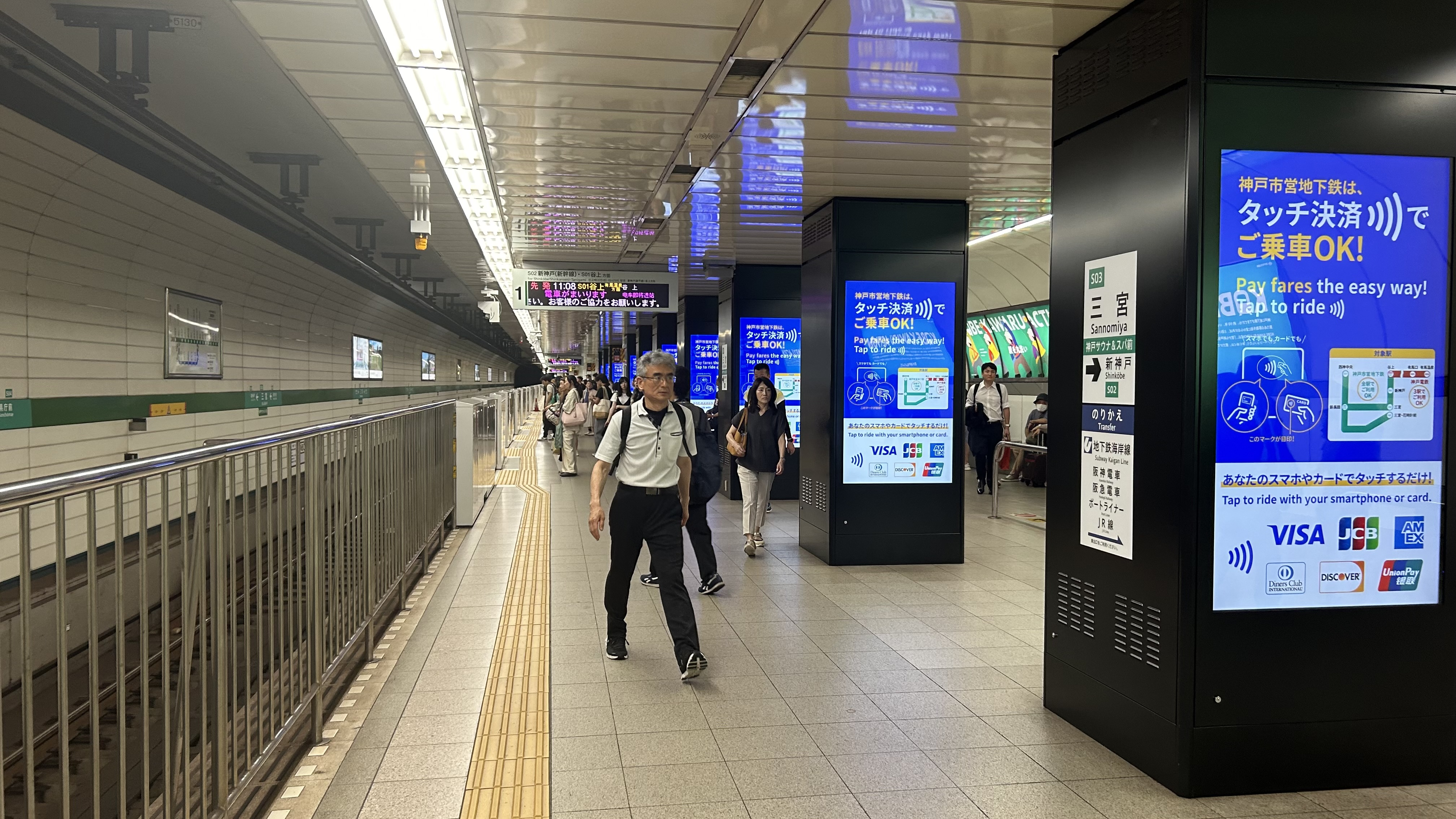
Platform 1 (July 2024)

== Port Liner ==
Sannomiya Station 三宮駅
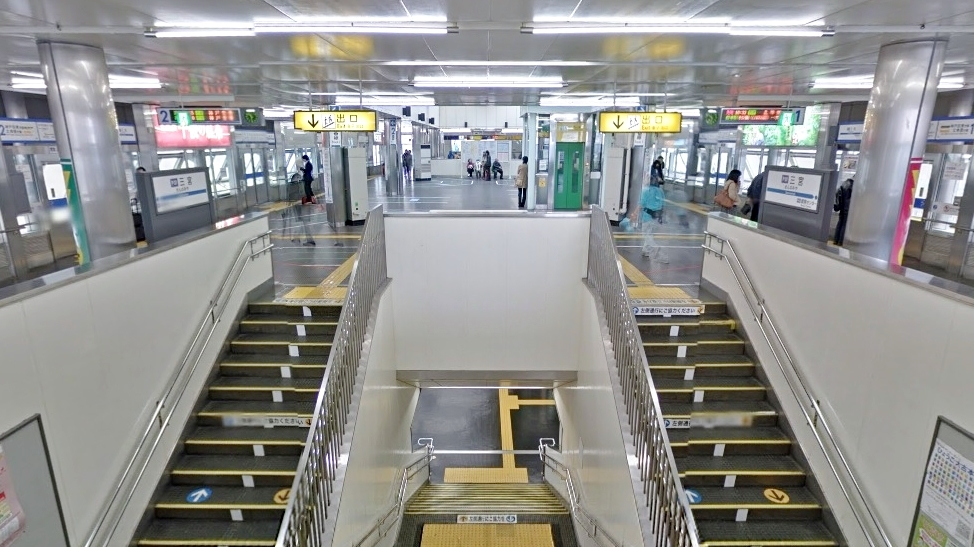

General information
- Location: Kumoi-dōri Hatchōme, Chūō-ku, Kobe, Hyōgo Prefecture; Japan
- Coordinates: 34°41′40.23″N 135°11′42.9″E
- System: Port Liner station
- Operator: Kobe New Transit
- Line: Port Island Line

Other information
- Station code: P01

History
- Opened: 5 February 1981

Services
Kobe New Transit Port Island Line (Port Liner, P01)
Terminus	Local	Bōeki Center (P02)
Location

=== Overview ===
The platforms for the Port Island Line opened on 5 February 1981. Platform screen doors have been installed since opening day.

=== Layout ===
This station has an island platform serving two elevated tracks.

1, 2	■ Port Liner	for Kobe Airport for Kita Futō

== Surroundings ==
East side (East entrance of Kobe New Transit and JR West)
- Kobe Shimbun Kaikan (M-INT Kobe)
  - Sannomiya Bus Terminal (M1 - M11)
- Daiei
- Chuo Ward Office, Kobe
- Shinki Bus Sannomiya Bus Terminal (M15)
South side (East of Flower Road, Center entrance of Hanshin Railway, Kobe New Transit and JR West)
- The Chuo Mitsui Trust and Banking Company, Limited Kobe Branch
  - Hanshin Bus expressway bus (Kobe Sannomiya), Transit buses (Sannomiya-ekimae) (Y1, Y2)
- Kobe Sanyo Bus expressway bus (Kobe Sannomiya), Transit buses (Sannomiya-ekimae) (M12 - M14)
- Sannomiya OPA
- Sogo Kobe
  - Shinki Bus expressway bus (Kobe Sannomiya), Transit buses (Sannomiya-ekimae) (Y3 - Y5)
- Kobe Loft
  - Transit buses (Hanshin-mae) (Y6, Y7)
- Kobe International House
- Joshin
South side (West of Flower Road, Entrances of Hankyu Railway, West entrance of Hanshin Railway and JR West)
- Kobe Kotsu Center Building
  - Airport limousine for Osaka International Airport and Kansai International Airport (S1)
- Sannomiyacho Itchome (Kobe City Bus) (S2)
- Kobe Marui
  - Transit buses (Hanshin-mae) (S3, S4)
- Sannomiya Center-gai
  - Transit buses (Hanshin-mae) (S5, S6)
- Sumitomo Mitsui Banking Corporation Sannomiya Branch
- Kobe City Hall
North side (East of Flower Road, East entrance of JR West and Kobe Subway)
- Sundai
- Transit buses (Subway Sannomiya) (N4 - N8)
North side (West of Flower Road, East entrance of Hankyu Railway and Kobe Subway)
- Yoyogi Seminar
- Transit buses (Subway Sannomiya) (N1 - N3)
West side (West entrance of Hankyu Railway and Kobe Subway)
- Tokyu Hands Sannomiya - connected with the west entrance of Kobe Subway
- Ikuta Shrine
- Ikuta Police Station (Hyogo Prefecture)
- Kobe Mosque a Kobe Islamic Community Center
- Kobe Tax Office
- NHK Kobe Broadcasting Station

== In popular culture ==
- Grave of the Fireflies (1988) depicts the arrival of the first Americans at the station after the end of World War II.

== See also ==
- List of railway stations in Japan
