= 8000 series =

8000 series or 8000 class may refer to:

== Computing and electronics ==
- PC-8000 Series Japanese model of consumer personal computers
- Radeon HD 8000 series graphics processing units manufactured by AMD
- Nokia 8000 series cellphone

== Train types ==
- Fujikyu 8000 series electric multiple unit train
- Hankyu 8000 series electric multiple unit train
- Hanshin 8000 series electric multiple unit train
- JR Shikoku 8000 series electric multiple unit train
- Keihan 8000 series electric multiple unit train
- Keio 8000 series electric multiple unit train
- Kita-Osaka Kyuko 8000 series electric multiple unit train
- Kobe New Transit 8000 series electric multiple unit train
- Meitetsu KiHa 8000 series diesel multiple unit train
- Nankai 8000 series electric multiple unit train
- Odakyu 8000 series electric multiple unit train, operated by Odakyu Electric Railway
- Sapporo Municipal Subway 8000 series subway cars
- Seibu 8000 series electric multiple unit train
- Shin-Keisei 8000 series electric multiple unit
- Sotetsu 8000 series electric multiple unit
- Tobu 8000 series electric multiple unit train
- Tokyo Metro 8000 series electric multiple unit train
- Tokyu 8000 series electric multiple unit train, operated by Tokyu Corporation
- Korail Class 8000 electric locomotive class
- PNR 8000 class diesel multiple unit train
- Washington Metro 8000-Series

== Other uses ==
- International 8000 series class 8 truck

== See also ==
- 8000 (disambiguation)
