= 8000 =

8000 may refer to:

== In general ==
- 8000 (number)
- A.D. 8000, a year in the 8th millennium CE
- 8000 BCE, a year in the 8th millennium BC
- A.D. 8000s, a decade, century, millennium of the 9th millennium CE
- 8000s BCE, a decade, century, millennium of the 9th millennium BC

== Products ==
- Beretta 8000, a handgun
- Delta 8000, space launch rocket
- Enfield 8000, an electric city car
- IBM 8000 mainframe computer

== Other uses ==
- 8000 Isaac Newton, an asteroid in the Asteroid Belt, the 8000th asteroid registered
- 8000 (District of Mat), one of the postal codes in Albania
- Eight-thousander, a mountain over 8000 meters high

== See also ==
- T-8000, a fictional character played by Arnold Schwarzenegger
- 8000 Plus, a British microcomputer magazine
- 8000 series (disambiguation) and 8000 class
- 800 (disambiguation)
- 80 (disambiguation)
