= Fujikyu 8500 series =

Japanese train type

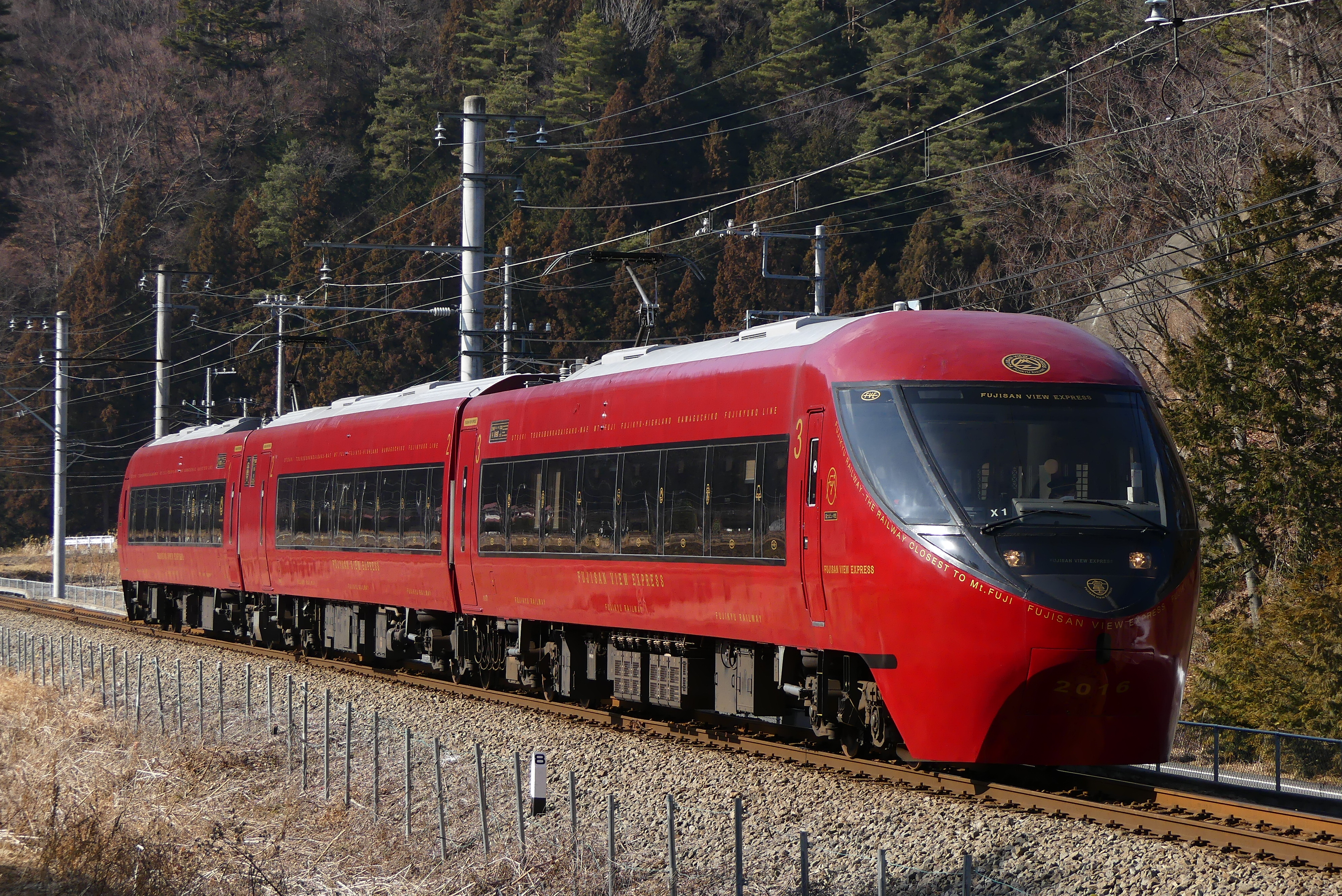
- The 8500 series train in January 2018
- In service: April 2016 – present
- Replaced: 2000 series
- Entered service: 23 April 2016
- Number in service: 3 cars (1 set)
- Formation: 3 cars per set
- Operator: Fujikyu
- Line served: Fujikyuko Line

Specifications
- Car body construction: Steel
- Car length: 21,000 mm (68 ft 11 in) (end cars); 19,500 mm (64 ft 0 in) (intermediate car)
- Width: 2,890 mm (9 ft 6 in)
- Height: 3,940 mm (12 ft 11 in)
- Floor height: 1,180 mm (3 ft 10 in)
- Doors: 1 per side
- Maximum speed: 120 km/h (75 mph)
- Electric system: 1,500 V DC overhead wire
- Track gauge: 1,067 mm (3 ft 6 in)

The Fujikyu 8500 series (富士急行8500系, Fuji Kyūkō 8000-kei) is a DC electric multiple unit (EMU) train operated by the private railway operator Fuji Kyuko (Fujikyu) on Fujisan View Express (富士山ビュー特急, Fujisan Byū Tokkyū) limited-stop services on the Fujikyuko Line in Yamanashi Prefecture, Japan, since 23 April 2016.

== Design ==
The three-car train was converted from the former 371 series seven-car EMU operated by JR Central from 1991 until November 2014. The design of the rebuilt train was overseen by industrial designer Eiji Mitooka.

== Operations ==
The 8500 series train operates on Fujisan View Express limited-stop services on the 26.6 km (16.5 mi) Fujikyuko Line in Yamanashi Prefecture, which runs between Ōtsuki and Kawaguchiko.

== Formation ==
The sole three-car set is formed as shown below, with two motored cars and one non-powered trailer car, and car 1 at the Fujisan end.

Car No.	1	2	3
Designation	Tsc1	Ms	Msc
Numbering	KuRo 8551	MoHa 8601	KuMoHa 8501
Weight (t)	36.8	39.5	41.0
Capacity (total/seated)	26/26	92/57	88/60

- KuRo 8551 was converted from former KuMoHa 371-1, MoHa 8601 was converted from former MoHa 370-101, and KuMoHa 8501 was converted from former KuMoHa 371–101.
- Cars 1 and 3 are each fitted with an FPS33E single-arm pantograph.

== Interior ==
Car 1 has an observation lounge area with 2+1 abreast seating bays and some loose seating. Cars 2 and 3 have rotating unidirectional reclining seating arranged 2+2 abreast with a seat pitch of 1,000 mm (39 in). Car 2 has a wheelchair-accessible seating area and a universal access toilet.

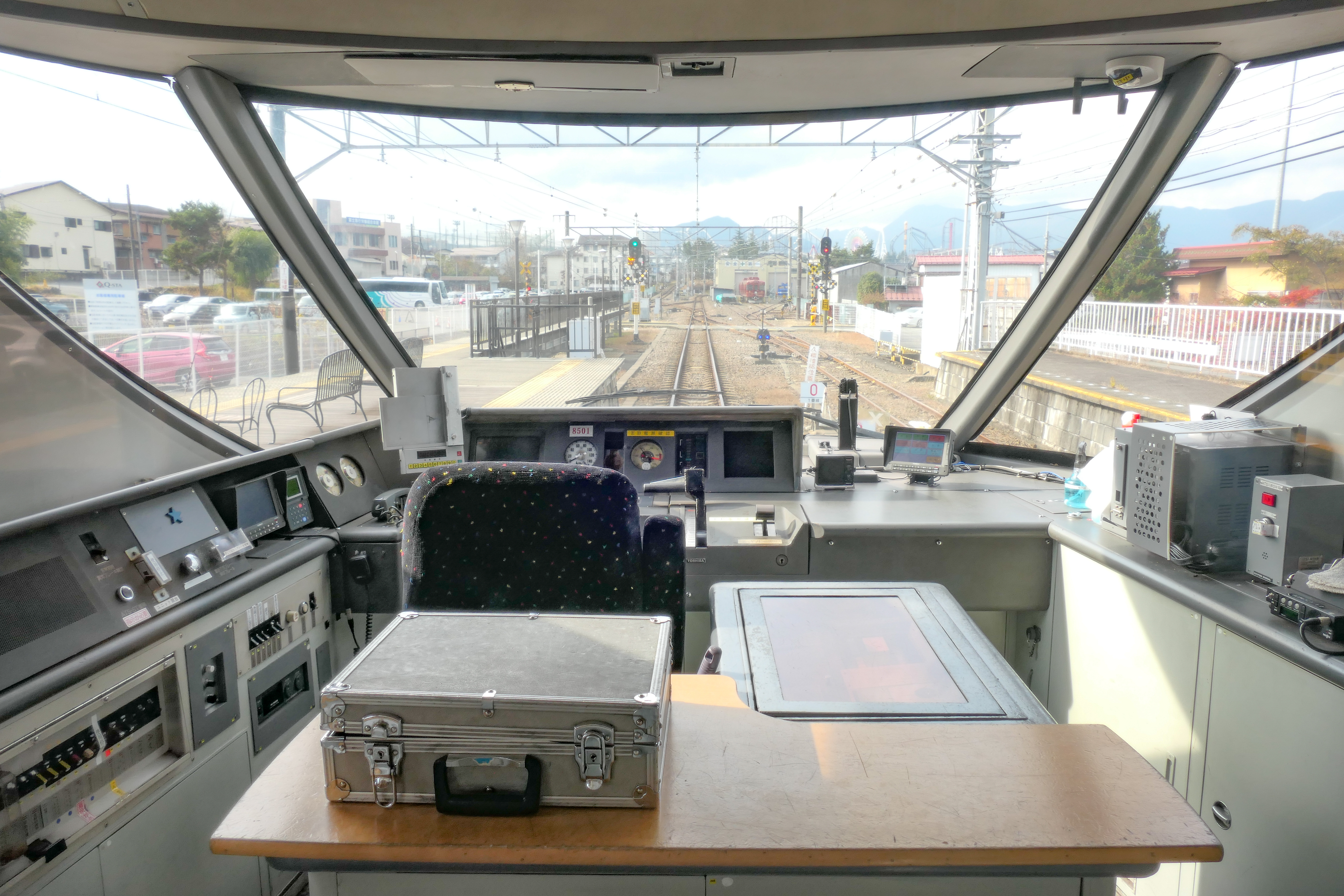
Inside the cab in November 2021

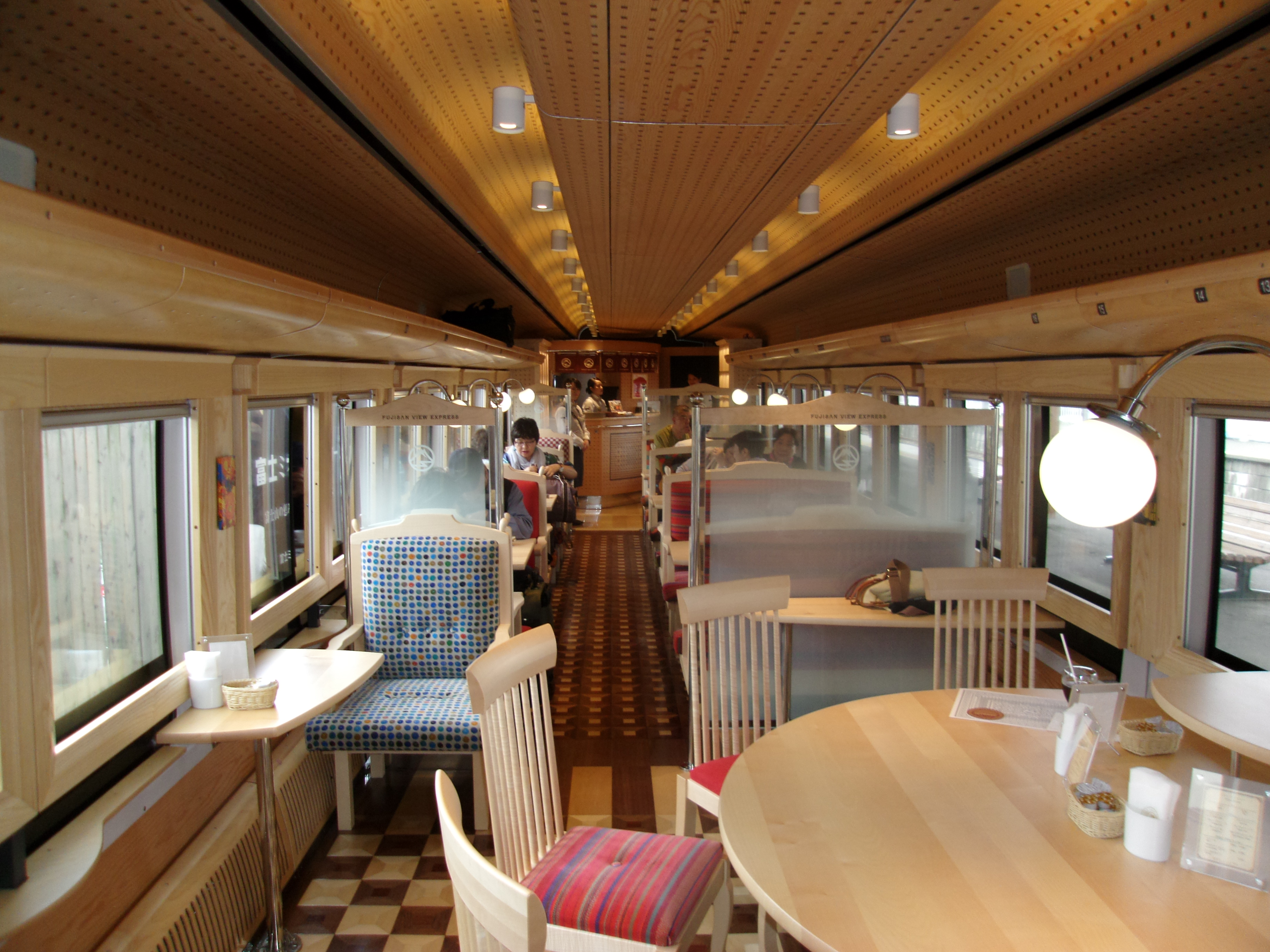
The interior of car 1 in June 2016

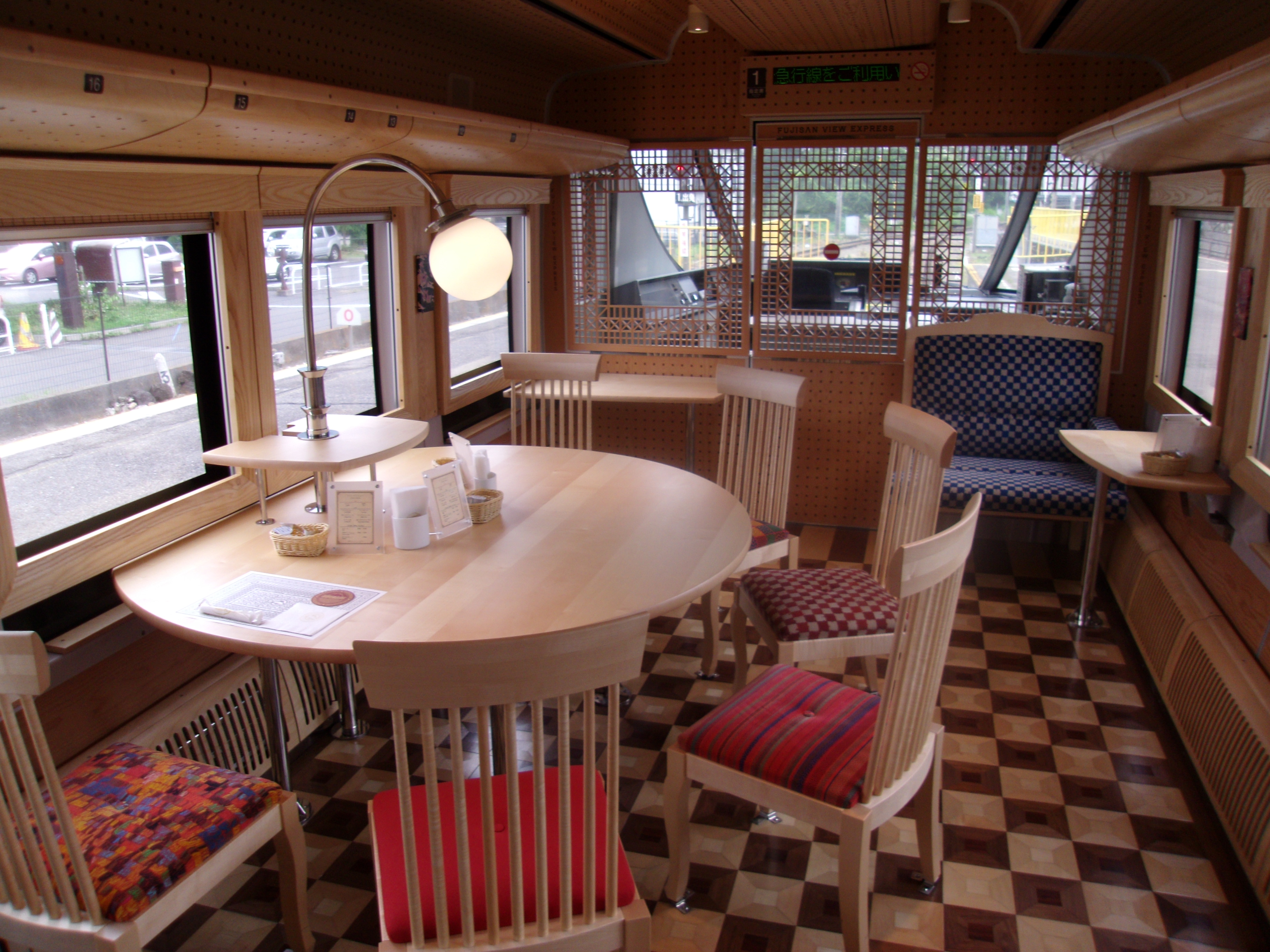
The lounge area in car 1

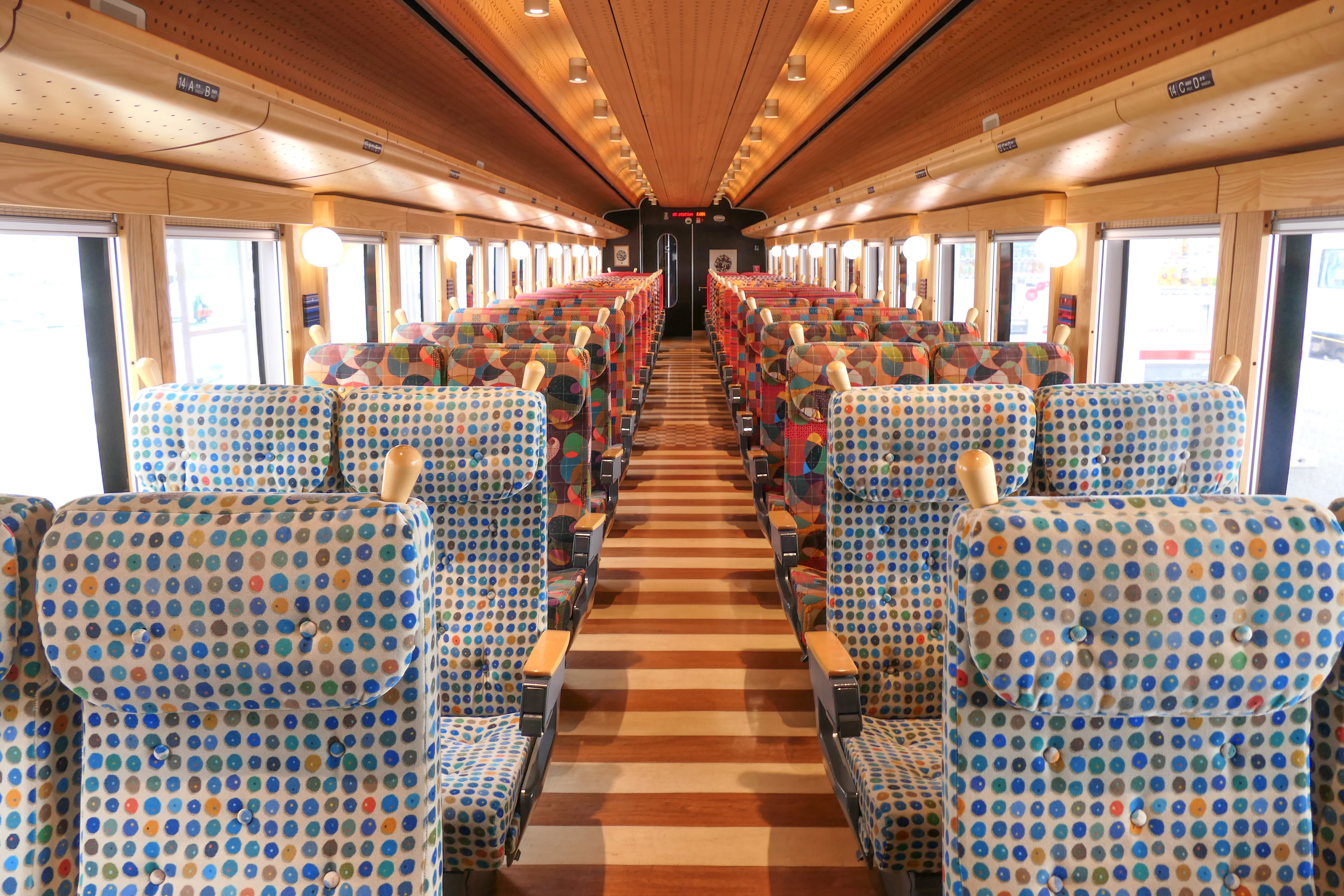
The interior of car 2 in November 2021

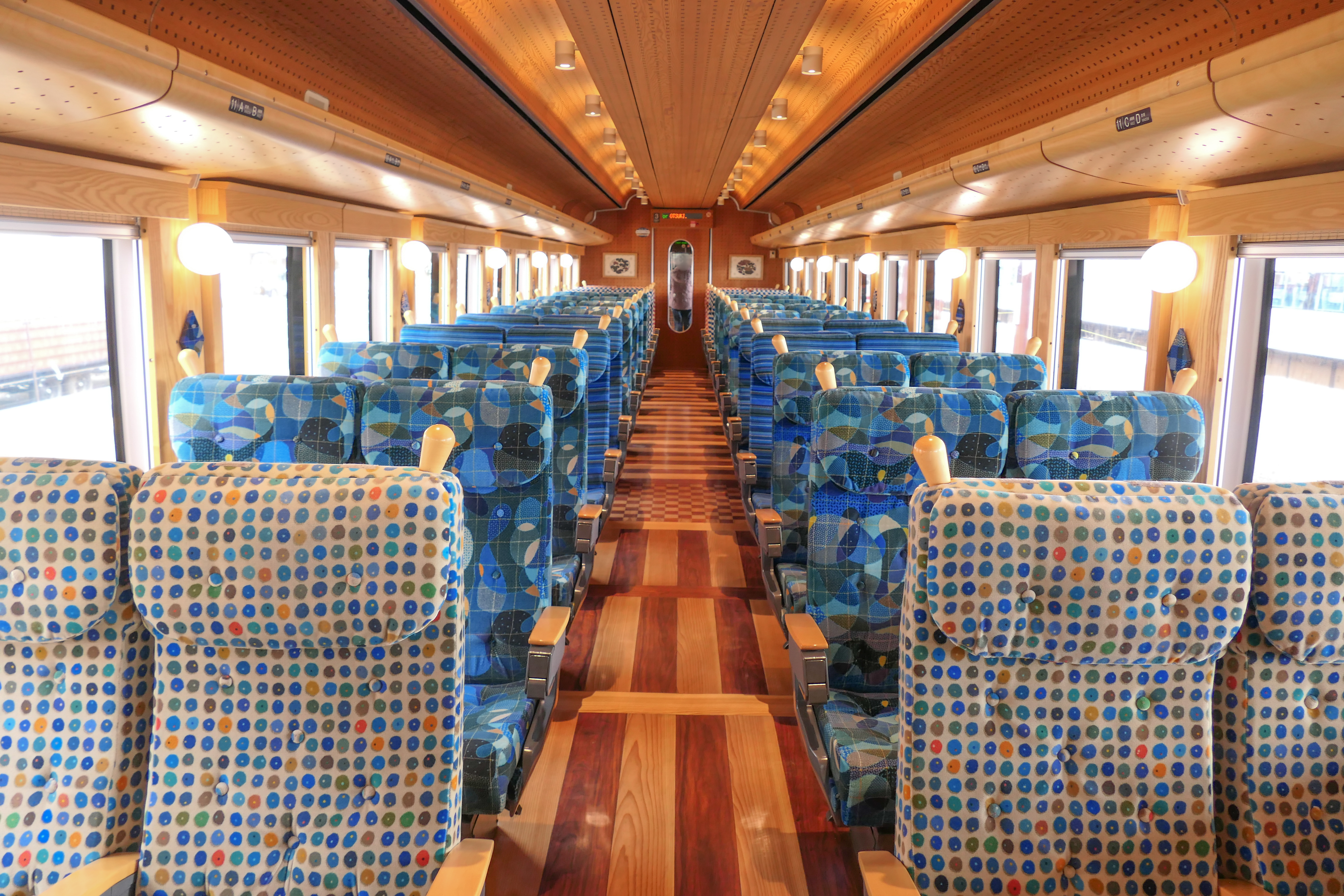
The interior of car 3 in November 2021

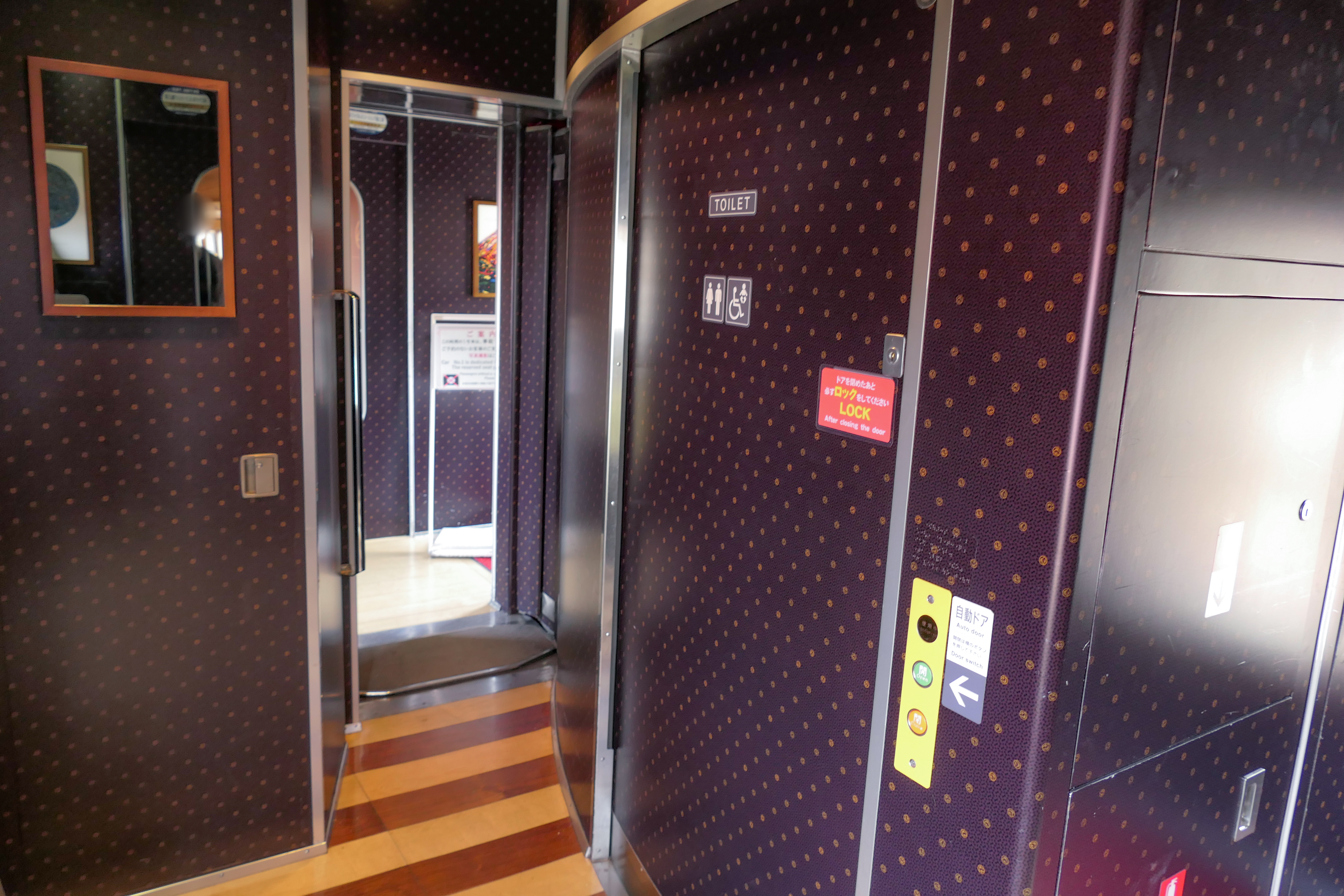
Interior near the deck and toilet in November 2021

== History ==
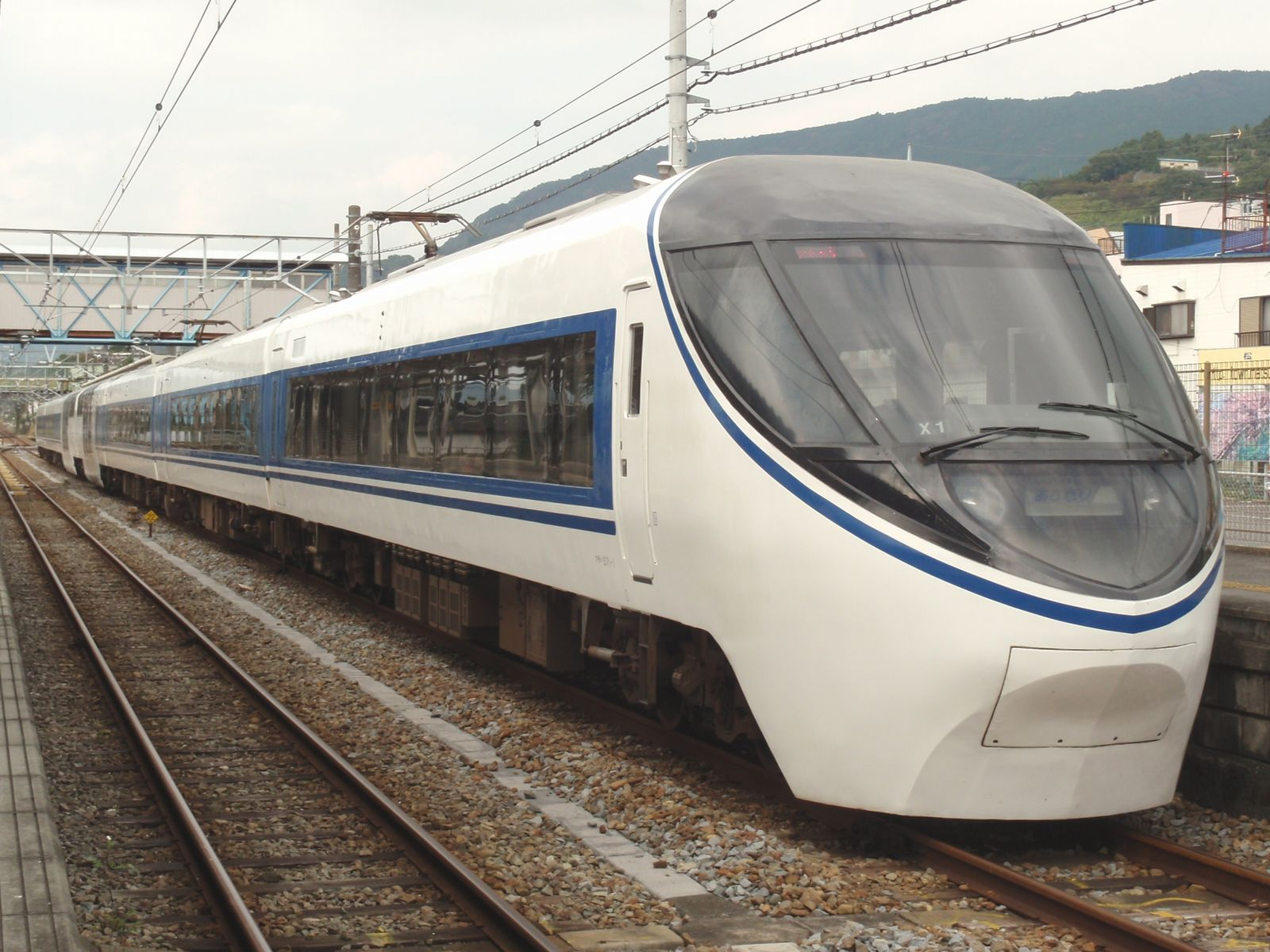
The JR Central 371 series train in October 2009

Fuji Kyuko announced in December 2014 that it planned to purchase the 371 series trainset from JR Central, and reform it as a three-car set for use during fiscal 2015. The withdrawn 371 series train was moved from Shizuoka to JR East's Nagano Works for rebuilding work in March 2015.

The train entered service on Fujisan View Express limited-stop services from 23 April 2016.
