= Fujikyu 2000 series =

Japanese DC electric multiple unit train type

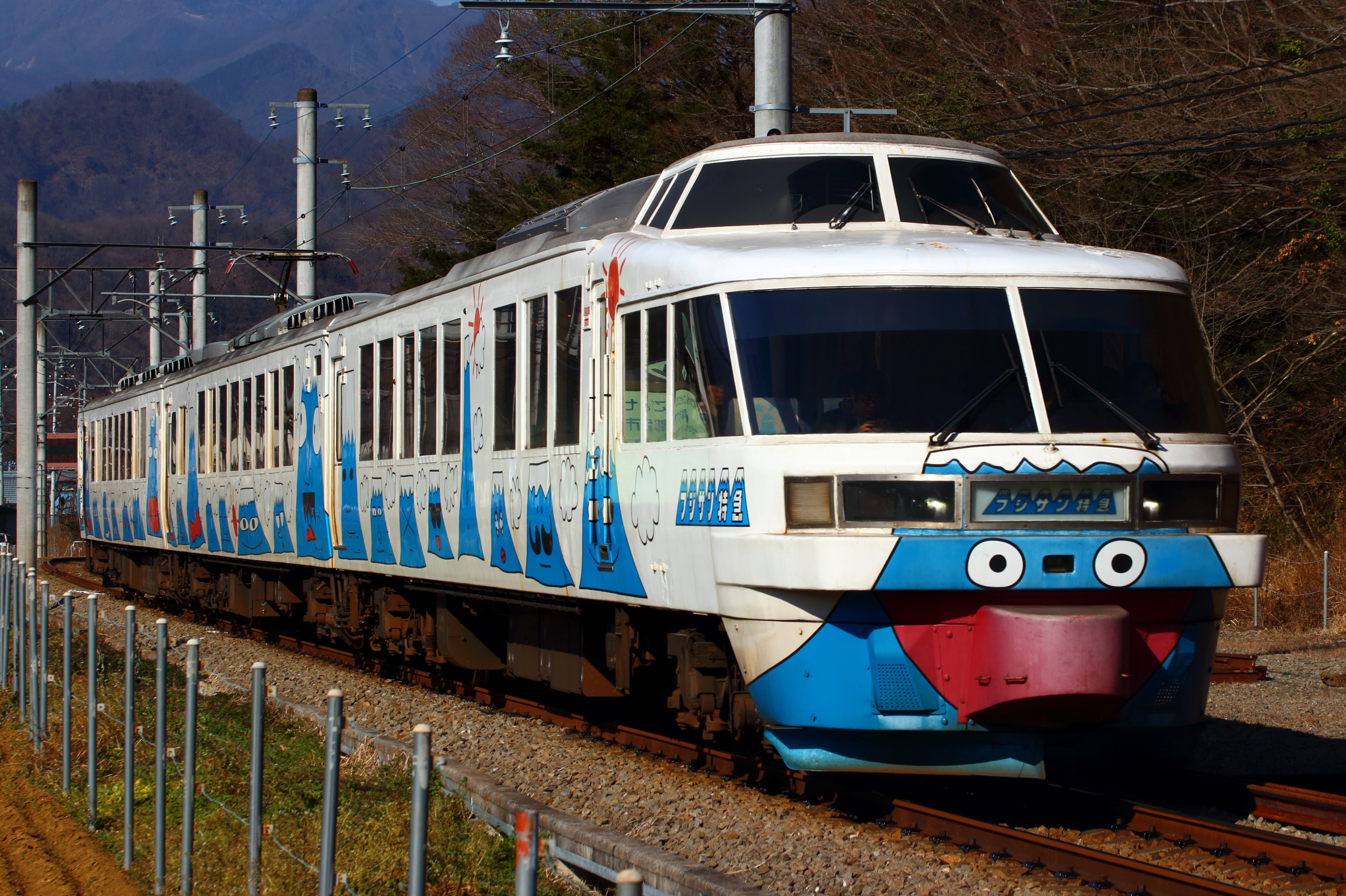
- Set 2001 in January 2016
- In service: February 2002 – February 2016 (14 years)
- Entered service: 28 February 2002
- Number built: 6 cars (2 sets)
- Number in service: None
- Number preserved: 4 cars
- Successor: Fujikyu 8000 series, Fujikyu 8500 series
- Formation: 3 cars per set
- Operator: Fujikyu
- Line served: Fujikyuko Line

Specifications
- Car body construction: Steel
- Car length: 20 m (65 ft 7 in)
- Height: 4,088 mm (13 ft 4.9 in)
- Doors: 1 per side
- Maximum speed: 60 km/h (37 mph)
- Electric system: 1,500 V DC overhead wire
- Track gauge: 1,067 mm (3 ft 6 in)

The Fujikyu 2000 series (富士急行2000系, Fuji Kyūkō 2000-kei) was a DC electric multiple unit (EMU) train type operated by the private railway operator Fuji Kyuko (Fujikyu) on Fujisan Limited Express (フジサン特急, Fujisan Tokkyū) limited-stop services on the Fujikyuko Line in Yamanashi Prefecture, Japan, from February 2002 until February 2016.

== Design ==
The two three-car trains was converted from the former JR East 165 series Panorama Express Alps Joyful Train excursion set purchased by Fujikyu in 2001 following its withdrawal by JR East.

== Operations ==
The 2000 series trains operated on Fujisan Limited Express limited-stop services on the 26.6 km Fujikyuko Line in Yamanashi Prefecture, which runs between Ōtsuki and Kawaguchiko alongside the operator's 8000 series set introduced in July 2014, which replaced one of the original two 2000 series sets.

== Formation ==
The three-car sets were formed as shown below, with car 1 at the Fujisan end.

Car No.	1	2	3
Designation	Tsc	M's	Msc
Numbering	200x	210x	210x

- Car 2 had a single-arm pantograph.
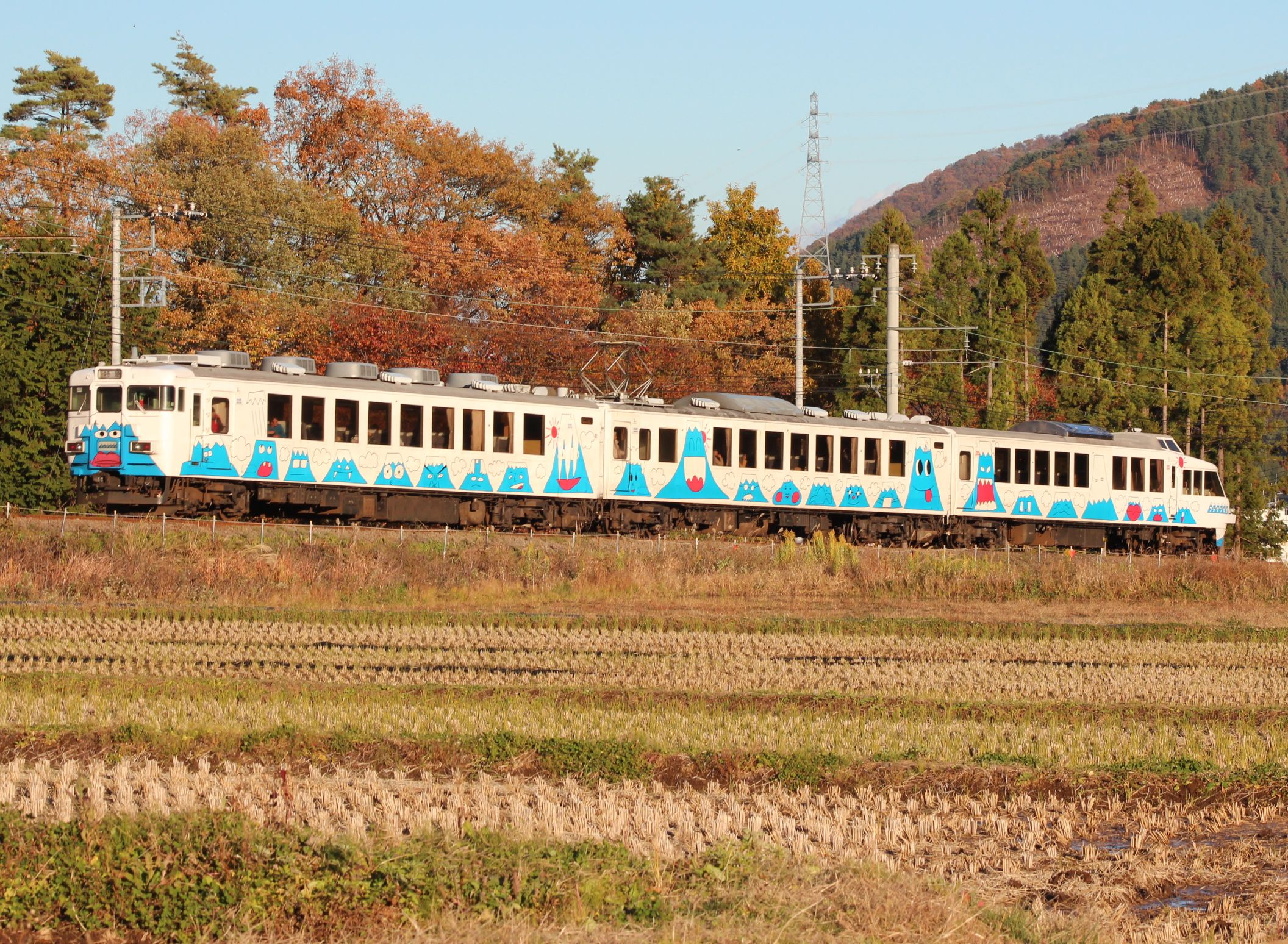
The train with the non-observation car leading in November 2012

== Interior ==
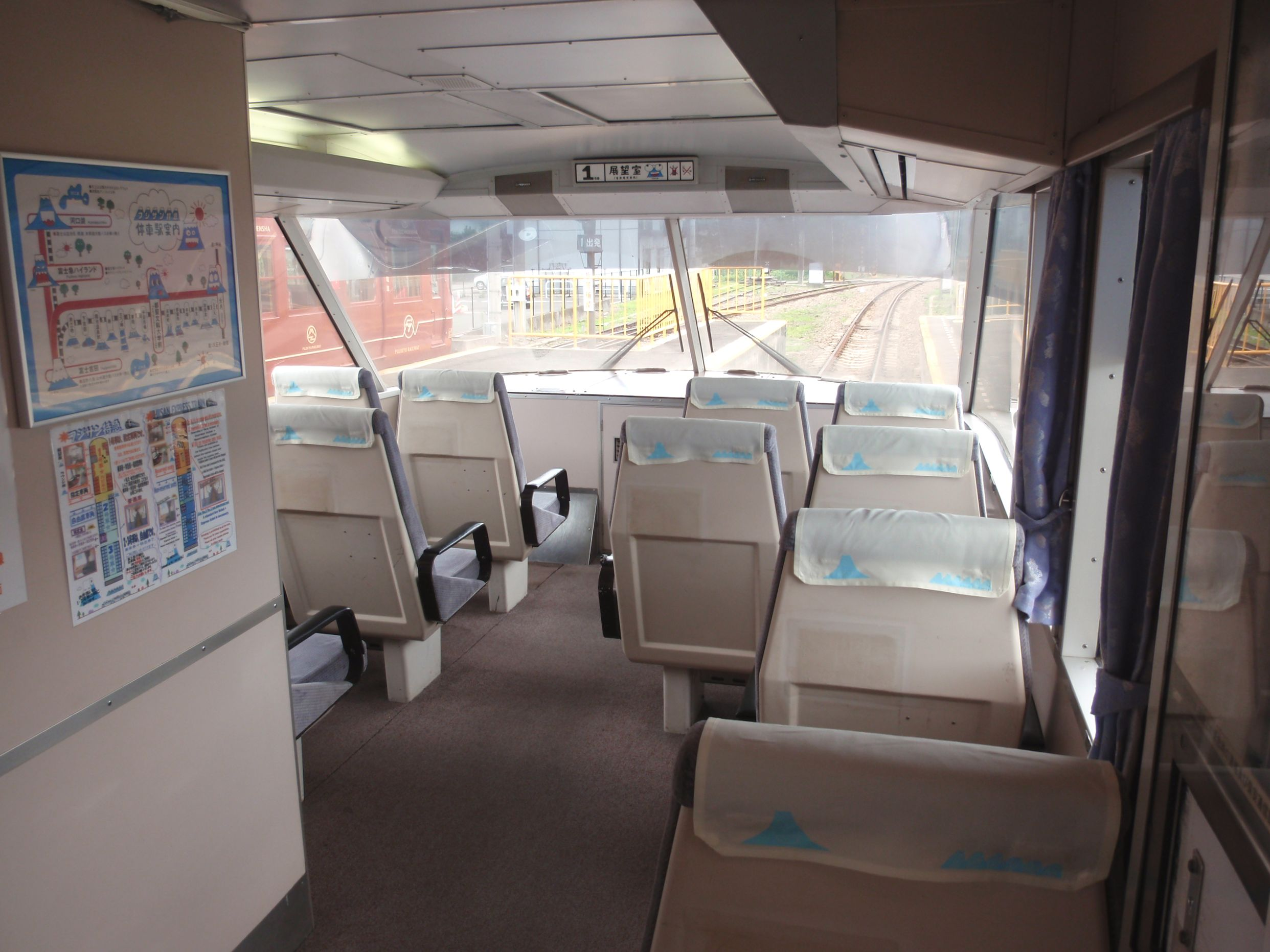
Interior of observation car 1 in August 2009

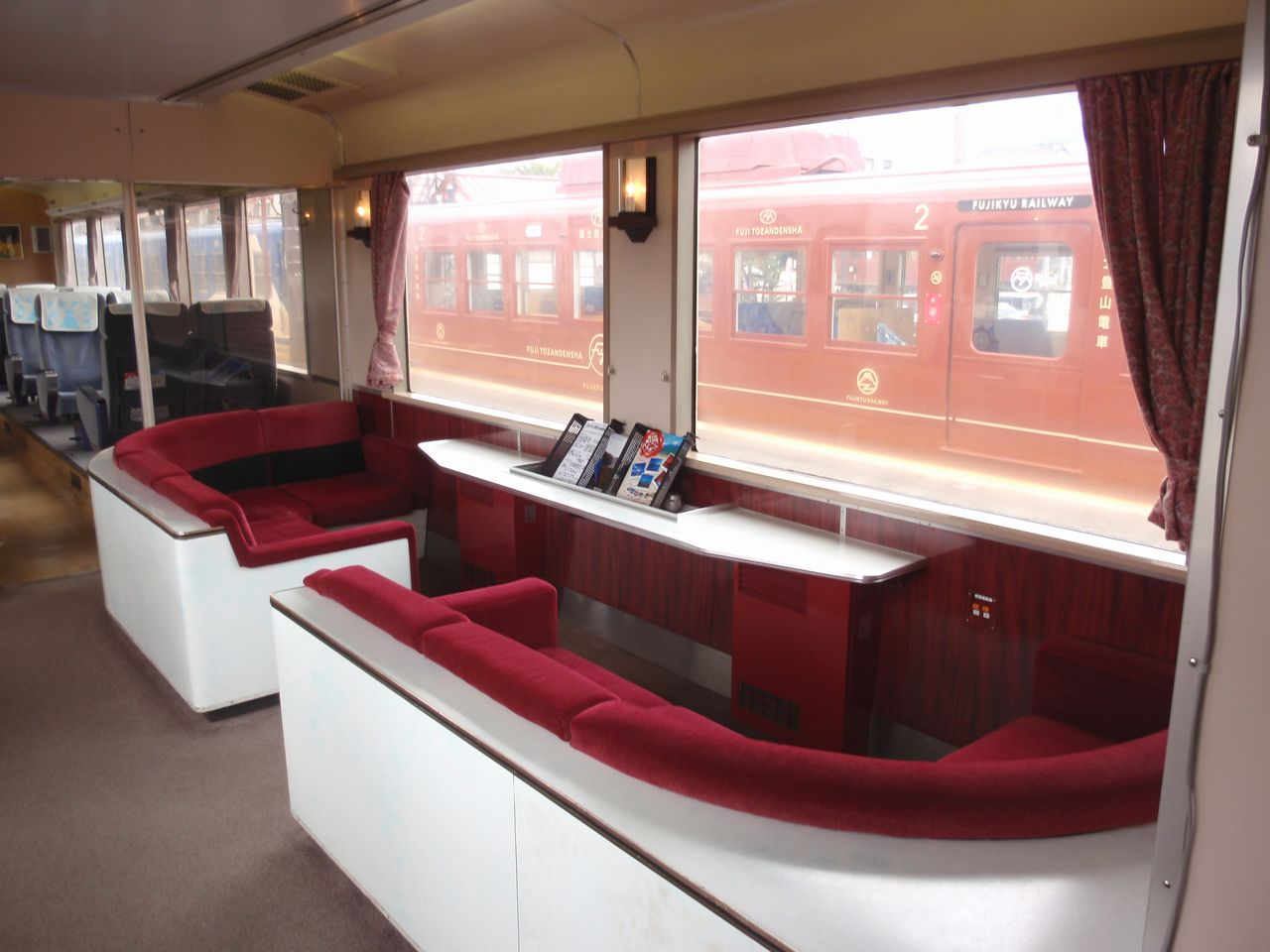
Lounge seating area in car 1 in August 2009

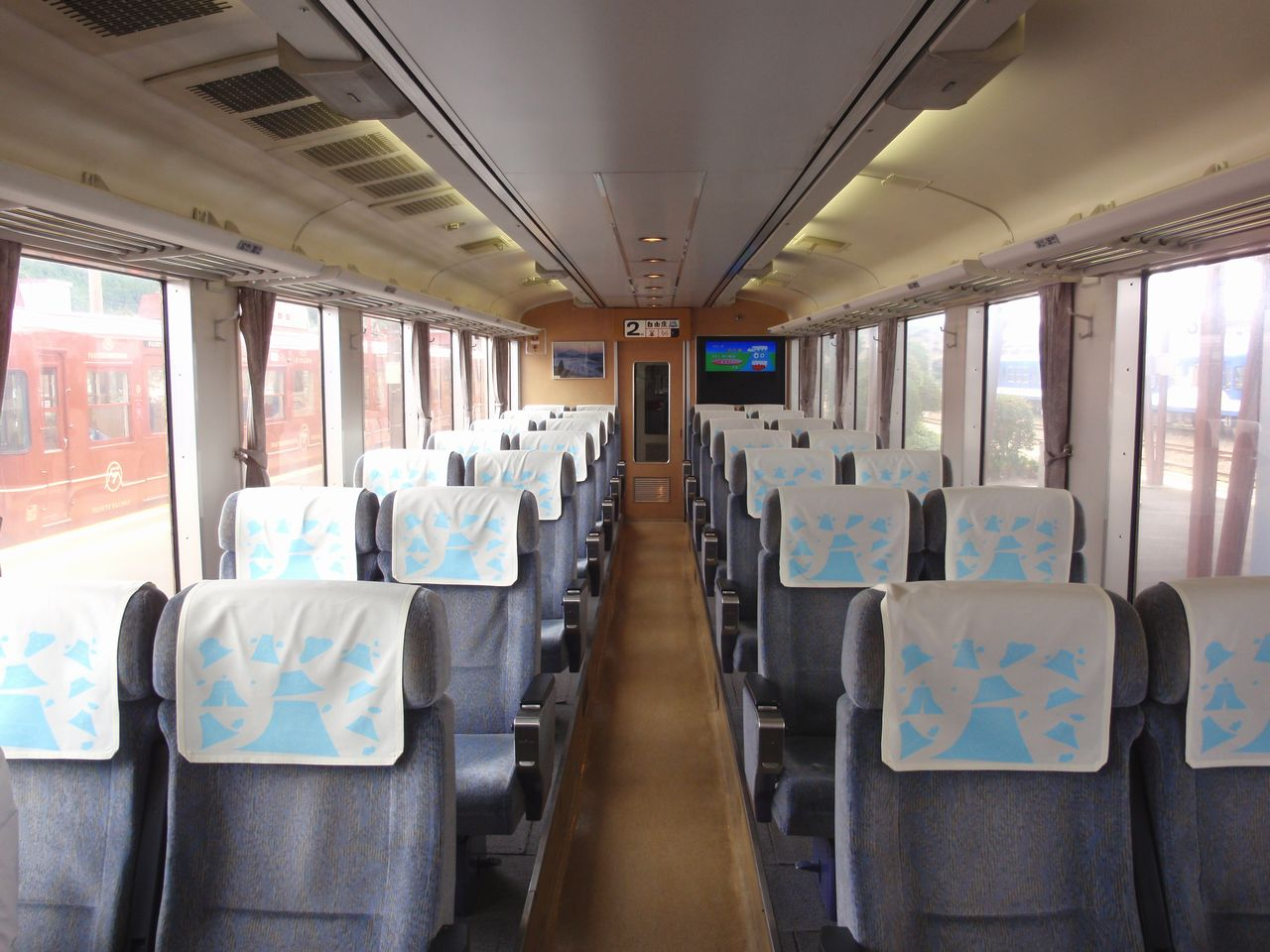
Interior of car 2 in August 2009

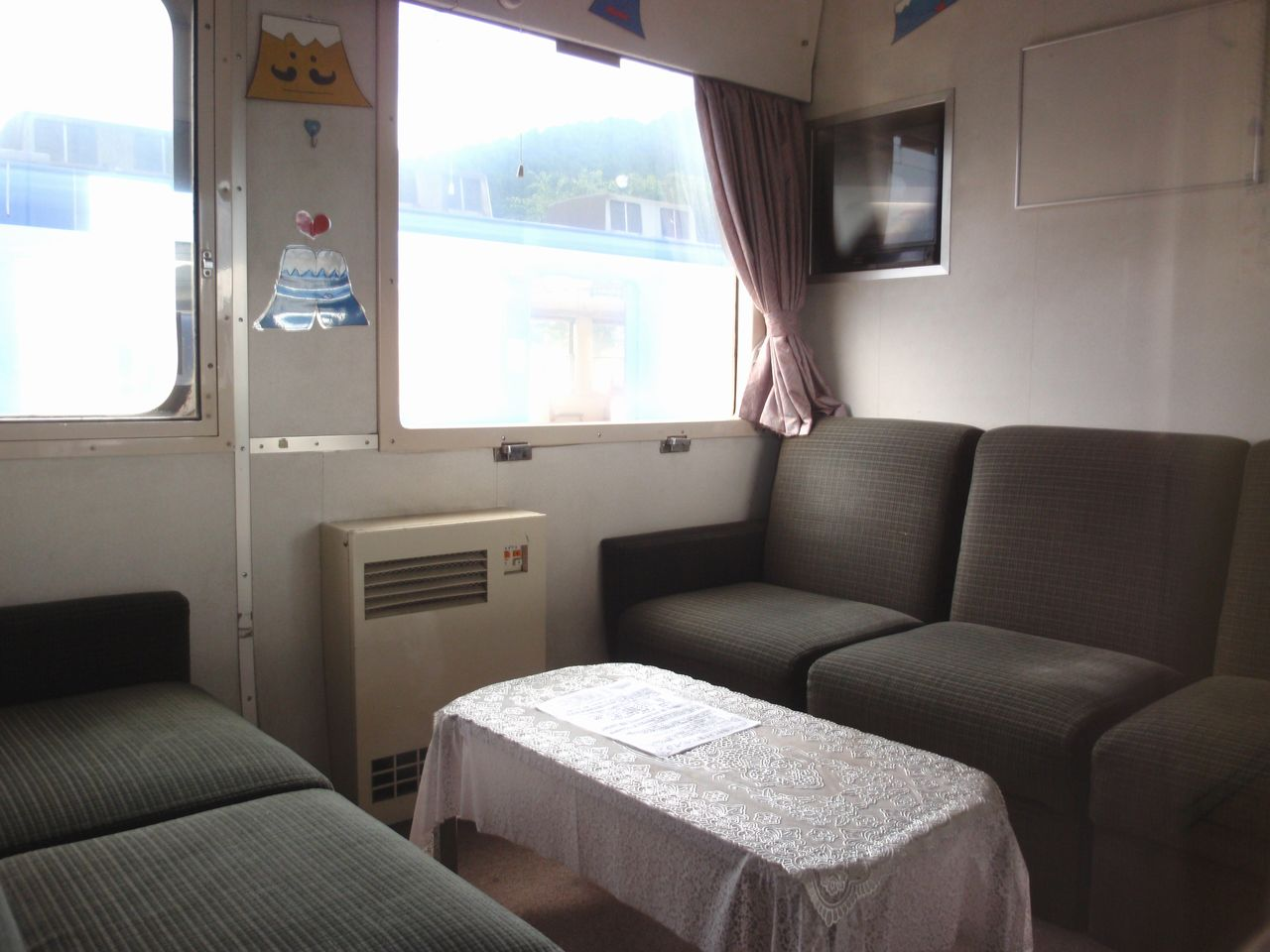
6-seat compartment in car 2 in August 2009

== History ==
Set 2002 was repainted into its original JR East Panorama Express Alps livery in 2013 ahead of its withdrawal.

The last remaining 2000 series set, 2001, was withdrawn after its final run on 7 February 2016. It was replaced by a new three-car Fujikyu 8500 series EMU introduced on Fujisan View Express (富士山ビュー特急) services.

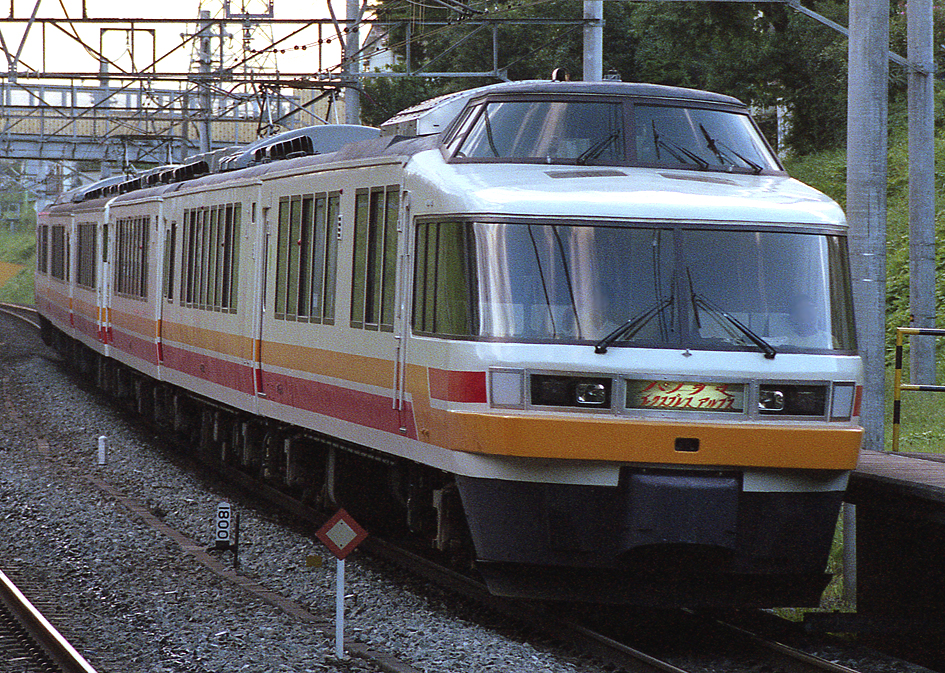
The 165 series Panorama Express Alps trainset in JR East days

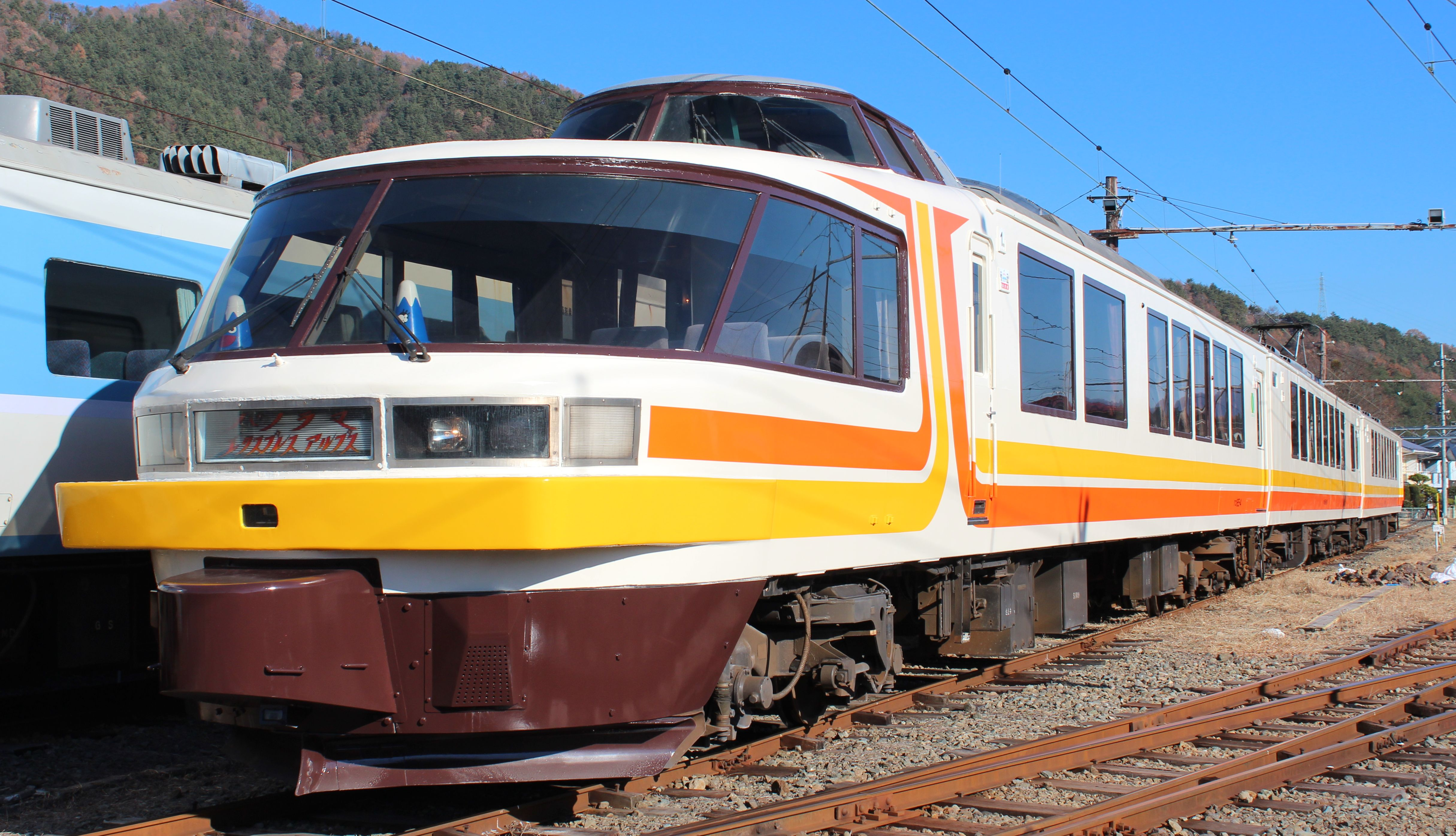
Set 2002 repainted in Panorama Express Alps livery in November 2013

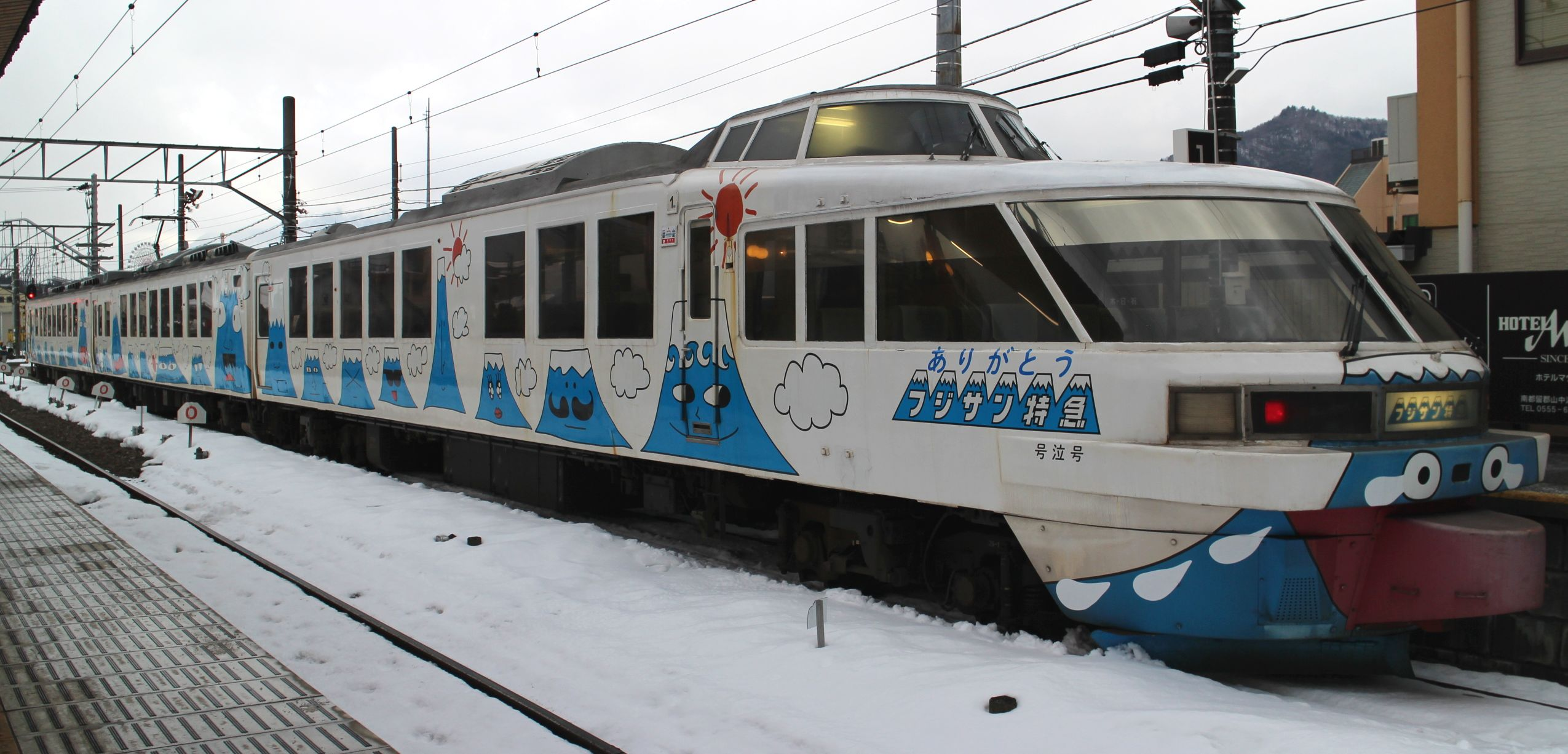
Set 2001 on its last day in service on 7 February 2016

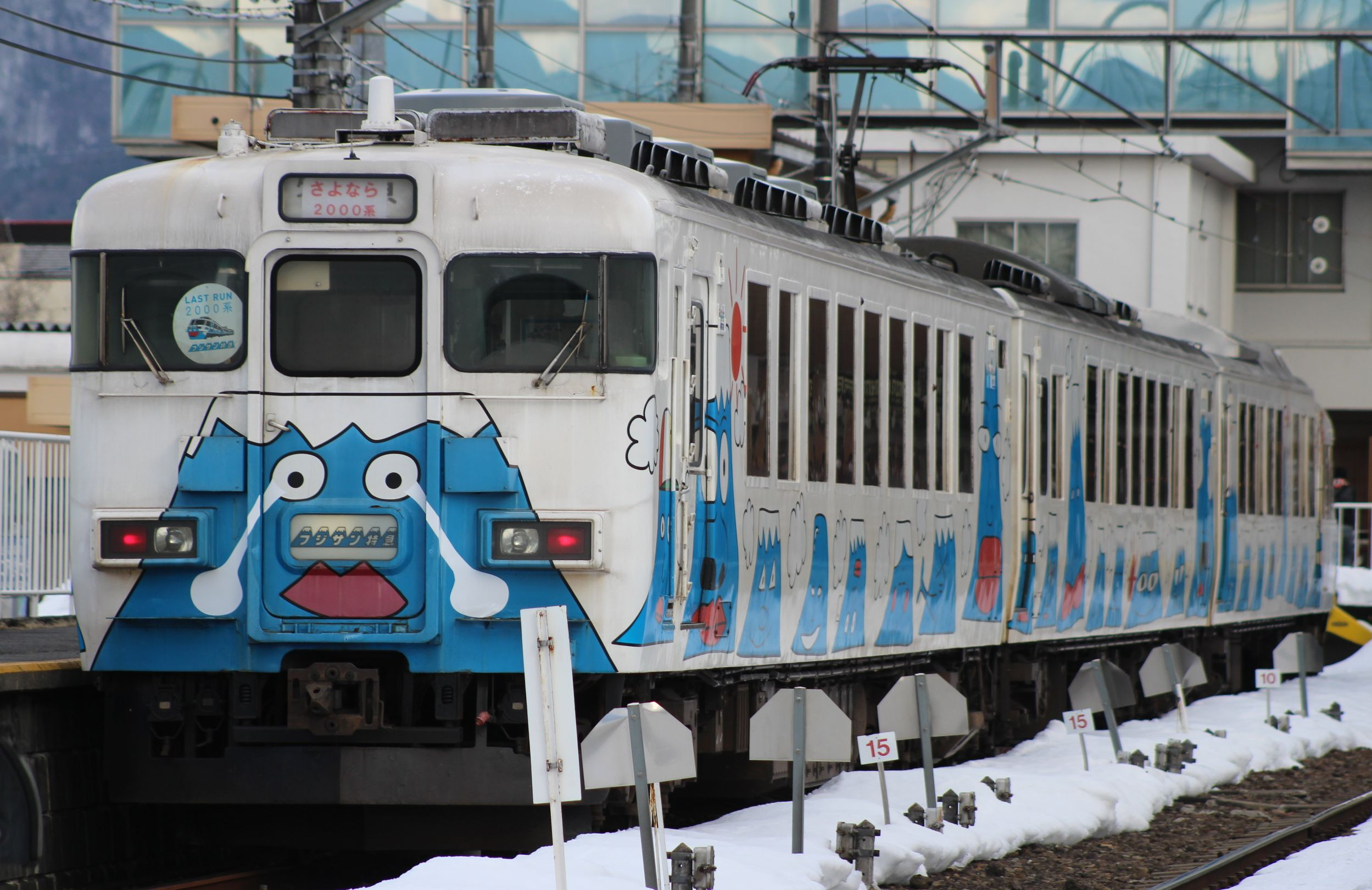
Set 2001 on its last day in service on 7 February 2016

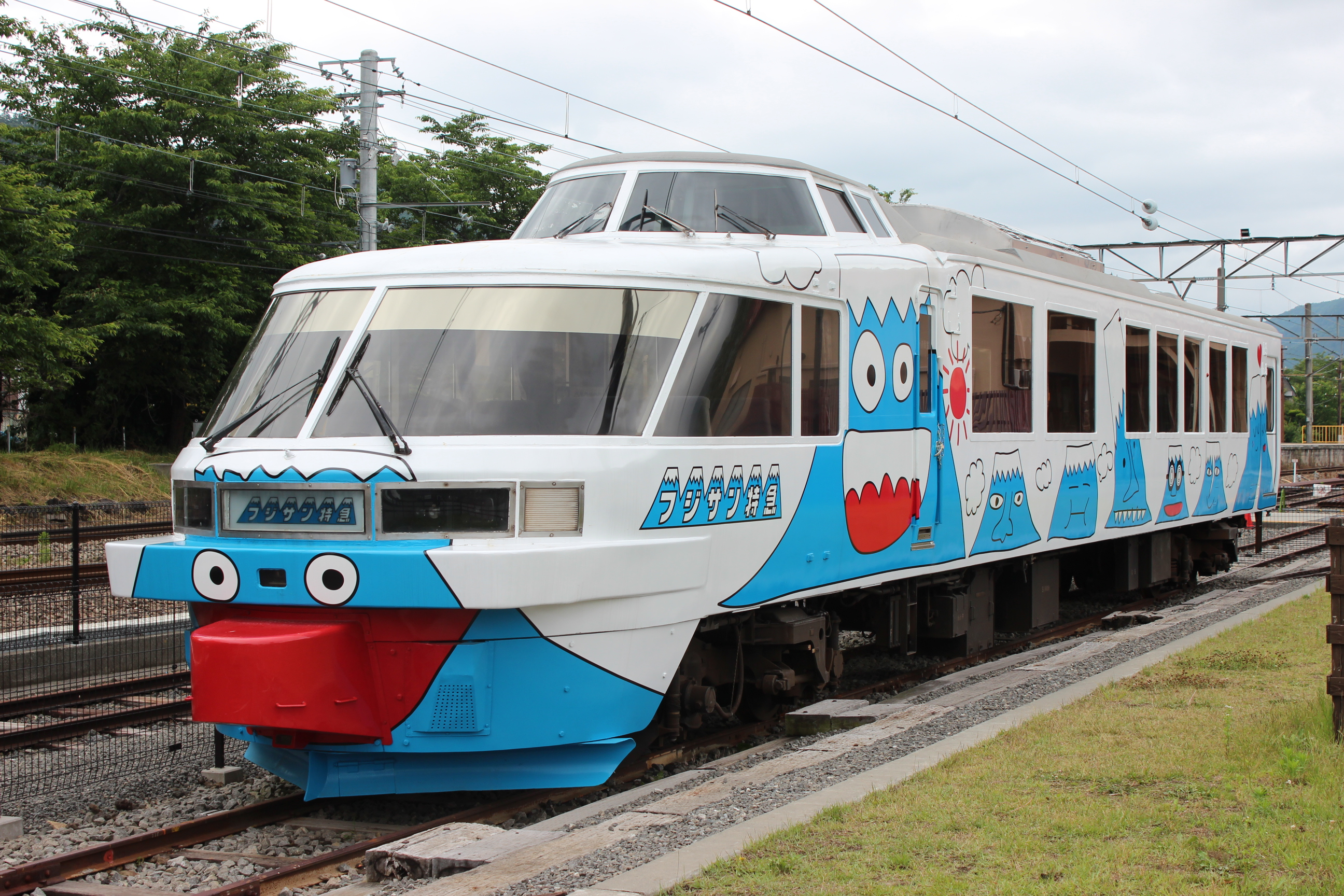
Car KuRo 2001 preserved next to Shimoyoshida Station in June 2017
