= 800 (disambiguation) =

Year 800 was a leap year starting on Wednesday of the Julian calendar.

800 may also refer to:

- 800 (number), the number
- 800 BC, a year
- The original toll-free area code for telephone calls in the North American Numbering Plan and some other countries
- The international direct dial code for toll-free international phone calls
- ISO 800, a common film speed for photographic films
- 800 AM, an AM radio station frequency
- TWA Flight 800, the flight number of an airplane disaster
- Atari 800, a home computer
- A perfect score on an individual section of the SAT test or on one of the SAT Subject Tests
- 800 metres, the name and distance in metres of an athletic event
- "800", a song by Saliva from their album Saliva (album)
- Nokia Lumia 800, a smartphone running Windows Phone operating system
- 800 (film), 2023 Indian Tamil-language biographical sports film

== Vehicles ==
=== Aircraft ===
- Hawker 800, a British aircraft

=== Automobiles ===
- SEAT 800, a 4-door variant of the SEAT 600
- Rover 800, an executive car
- Maruti Suzuki 800, a hatchback

== See also ==
- List of highways numbered 800
- The Eight Hundred
