= Kobe New Transit 8000 series =

Japanese train type

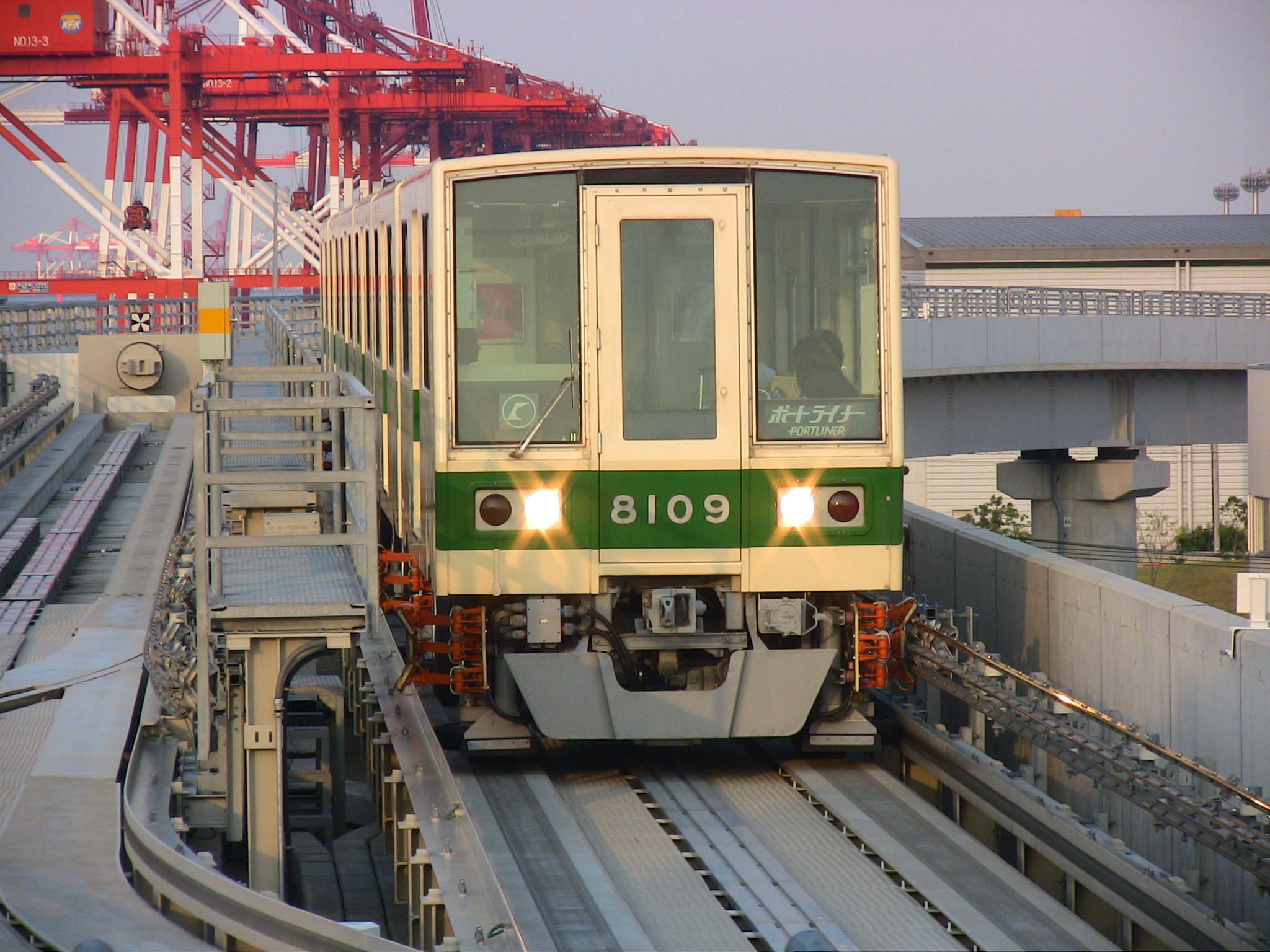
- Kobe New Transit 8000 series, September 2006
- In service: 1981–2009
- Manufacturer: Kawasaki Heavy Industries
- Number built: 72 vehicles (12 sets)
- Number in service: None
- Number preserved: 2 vehicles
- Number scrapped: 70 vehicles
- Formation: 6 cars per trainset
- Operators: Kobe New Transit
- Lines served: Port Island Line

Specifications
- Car body construction: Aluminium
- Maximum speed: 60 km/h (37 mph)
- Traction system: Thyristor drive
- Electric system(s): 600 V 60 Hz 3-phase AC Third rail
- Safety system(s): ATC

The Kobe New Transit 8000 series (神戸新交通8000型) was an automated guideway transit (AGT) vehicle used for passenger service on the Port Island Line (Port Liner) of the Kobe New Transit. Entering service in February 1981, the last 8000 series train was withdrawn in November 2009 being replaced by 2000 series trains.

== Preservation ==
Cars KNT-8101 and KNT-8201 have been preserved.

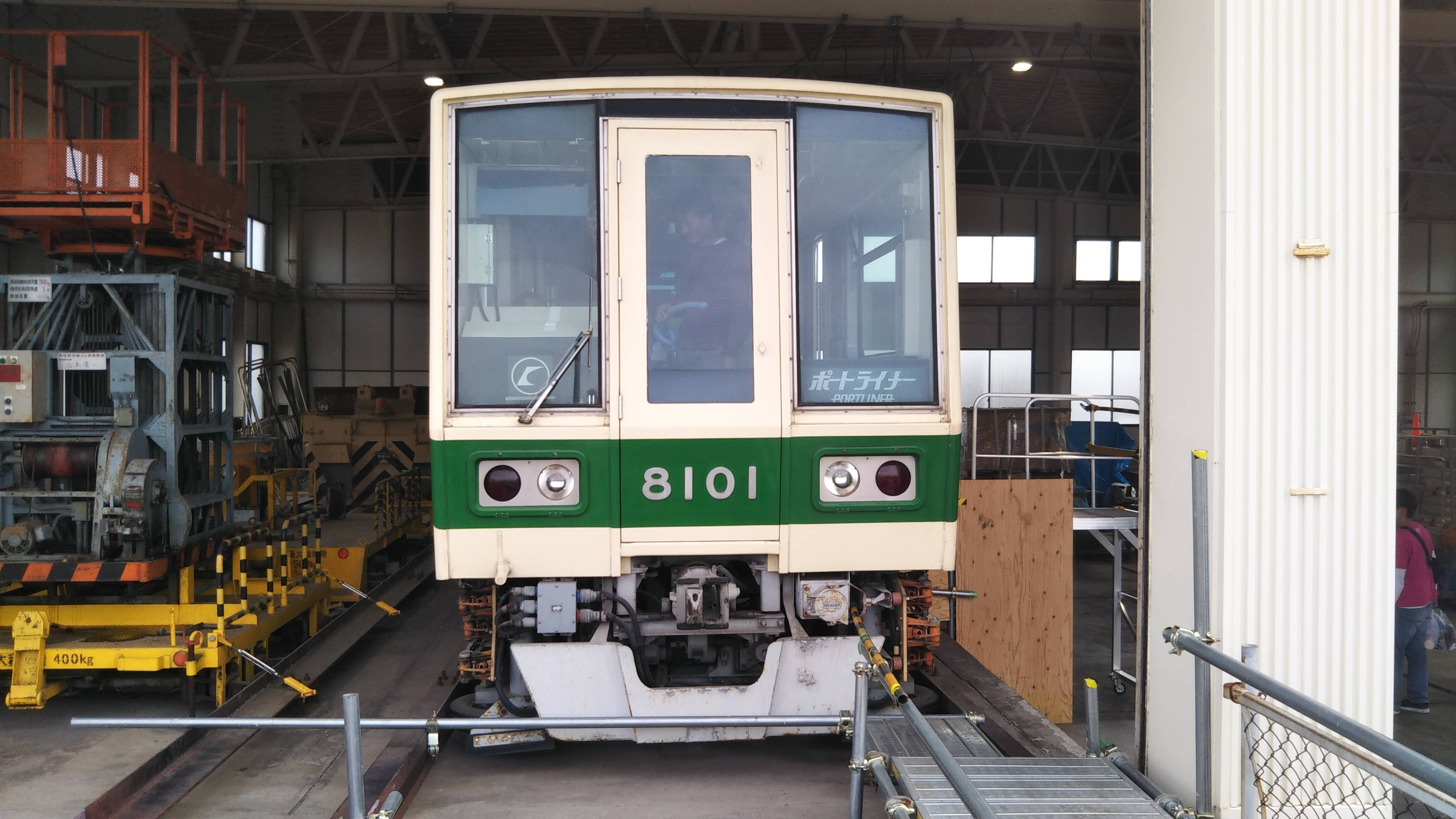
Preserved car 8101 in October 2019
