= Keio 8000 series =

Japanese electric multiple unit train type

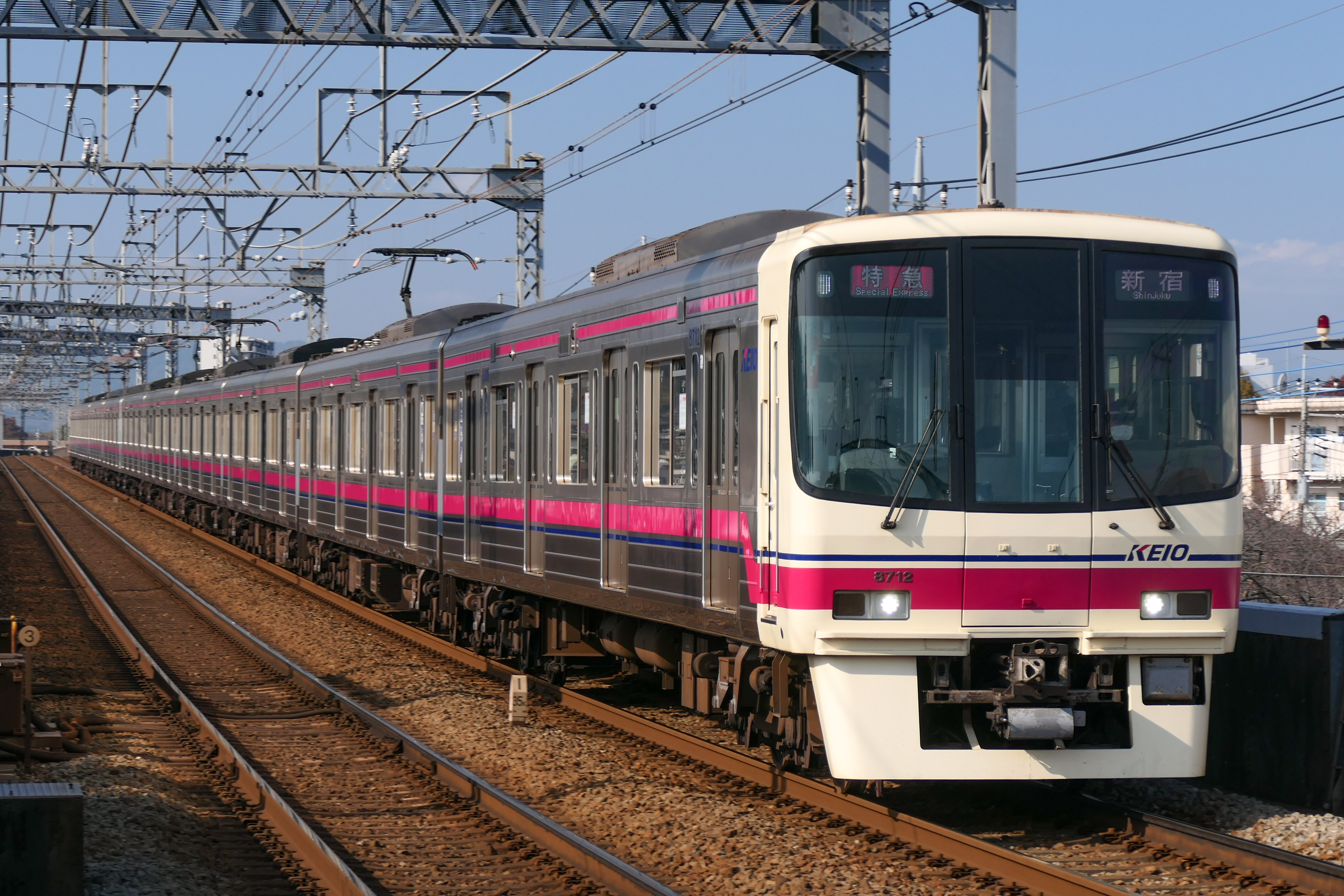
- 10-car set 8712 in November 2021
- In service: 1992 – Present
- Manufacturers: Nippon Sharyo, Tokyu Car Corporation
- Replaced: 5000 series
- Constructed: 1992 – 1999, 2009
- Entered service: 11 May 1992
- Refurbished: 2013 – 2019 (merging of 4-car and 6-car sets); 2013 – Present (traction system replacement)
- Number built: 245 cars (41 sets + 1 car)
- Number in service: 244 cars (27 sets)
- Number scrapped: 1 car (8728(I), accident damage)
- Formation: 8/10 cars per trainset (present); 4/6/8 cars per trainset (as built)
- Fleet numbers: 8701 – 8714 (10-car sets); 8721 – 8733 (8-car sets); Previously: 8701 – 8714 (6-car sets); 8801 – 8814 (4-car sets)
- Capacity: 143 (end cars); 154/155 (intermediate cars)
- Operator: Keio Corporation
- Depots: Wakabadai, Takahatafudō
- Line served: Keio Line

Specifications
- Car body construction: Ivory painted steel (cab ends); Stainless steel (body)
- Car length: 20,000 mm (65 ft 7 in) (full length); 19,500 mm (64 ft 0 in) (body length)
- Width: 2,845 mm (9 ft 4.0 in) (full width); 2,770 mm (9 ft 1 in) (body width)
- Height: 4,055 mm (13 ft 3.6 in) (car without pantograph); 4,100 mm (13 ft 5 in) (car with pantograph)
- Entry: Level
- Doors: 4 pairs of sliding doors per side
- Wheel diameter: 860 mm (34 in)
- Wheelbase: 2,200 mm (87 in) (motored bogie); 2,100 mm (83 in) (trailer bogie)
- Maximum speed: 110 km/h (68 mph) (service); 120 km/h (75 mph) (design)
- Weight: 131 t (129 long tons; 144 short tons)(4-car sets); 204 t (201 long tons; 225 short tons) (6-car sets); 259 t (255 long tons; 285 short tons) (8-car sets)
- Traction system: GTO-VVVF
- Power output: 150 kW (200 hp) per motor
- Acceleration: 3.3 km/(h⋅s) (2.1 mph/s) (after high acceleration modification); 2.5 km/(h⋅s) (1.6 mph/s) (as built)
- Deceleration: 3.5 km/(h⋅s) (2.2 mph/s) (full-service braking); 4.0 km/(h⋅s) (2.5 mph/s) (emergency braking)
- Electric system: 1,500 V DC overhead catenary
- Current collection: Pantograph
- Bogies: TS-823A/TS-824; TS-1017/TS-1018 (sets 8732 and 8733 only)
- Braking system: Electronically controlled pneumatic brakes with regenerative braking
- Safety system: Keio ATC
- Coupling system: Shibata
- Headlight type: Sealed beam
- Seating: Longitudinal
- Track gauge: 1,372 mm (4 ft 6 in)

The Keio 8000 series (京王8000系) is an electric multiple unit (EMU) train type operated by the private railway operator Keio Corporation on commuter services in the Tokyo area of Japan since 1992.

== Technical details ==
- MT ratio
  - 0 subseries: 10-car set: 6M4T (six motor cars and four trailer cars; each motor car has four motors)
  - 20 subseries: eight-car set: 4M4T
- Motor output: 150 kilowatts (200 hp)
- Gear ratio: 6.07
- Drive mechanism: Parallel cardan
- Traction control system: GTO-VVVF
- Headlights: Sealed beam
- Destination indicators: roller-blind or 3-color LED
- Passenger information displays: 3-color LED (4 per car)
- Seating arrangement (intermediate cars): 4-7-7-7-4 on longitudinal bench seats

=== Body ===
The body is stainless steel. The front is steel.

=== Driver's cab ===
"T" shape one handle master-controller system. Analog (formerly digital) speedometer. TNS (Train Navigation System).

- Acceleration: 4 notch
- Deceleration: 7 notch + emergency

== Formations ==
As of 1 April 2015, the fleet consists of 14 ten-car sets and 13 eight-car sets (244 vehicles in total), formed as follows.

- c=Driver's cab; T=trailer, M=motor

=== 0-subseries ten-car sets ===
	← Shinjuku Keio-Hachiōji →										
Designation	Tc	M	M	M	M	T		T	M	M	Tc
Numbering	8701 : 8713	8001 : 8013	8051 : 8063	8101 : 8113	8151 : 8163	8751 : 8763	+	8801 : 8813	8201 : 8213	8251 : 8263	8851 : 8863
Numbering	8714	8014	8064	8114	8164	8514	+	8564	8214	8264	8864

=== 20-subseries eight-car sets ===
	← Shinjuku Keio-Hachiōji →							
Designation	Tc	M	M	T	T	M	M	Tc
Capacity (total)	143	155	154					143
Numbering	8721 : 8733	8021 : 8033	8071 : 8083	8521 : 8533	8571 : 8583	8121 : 8133	8171 : 8183	8771 : 8783

== Interior ==
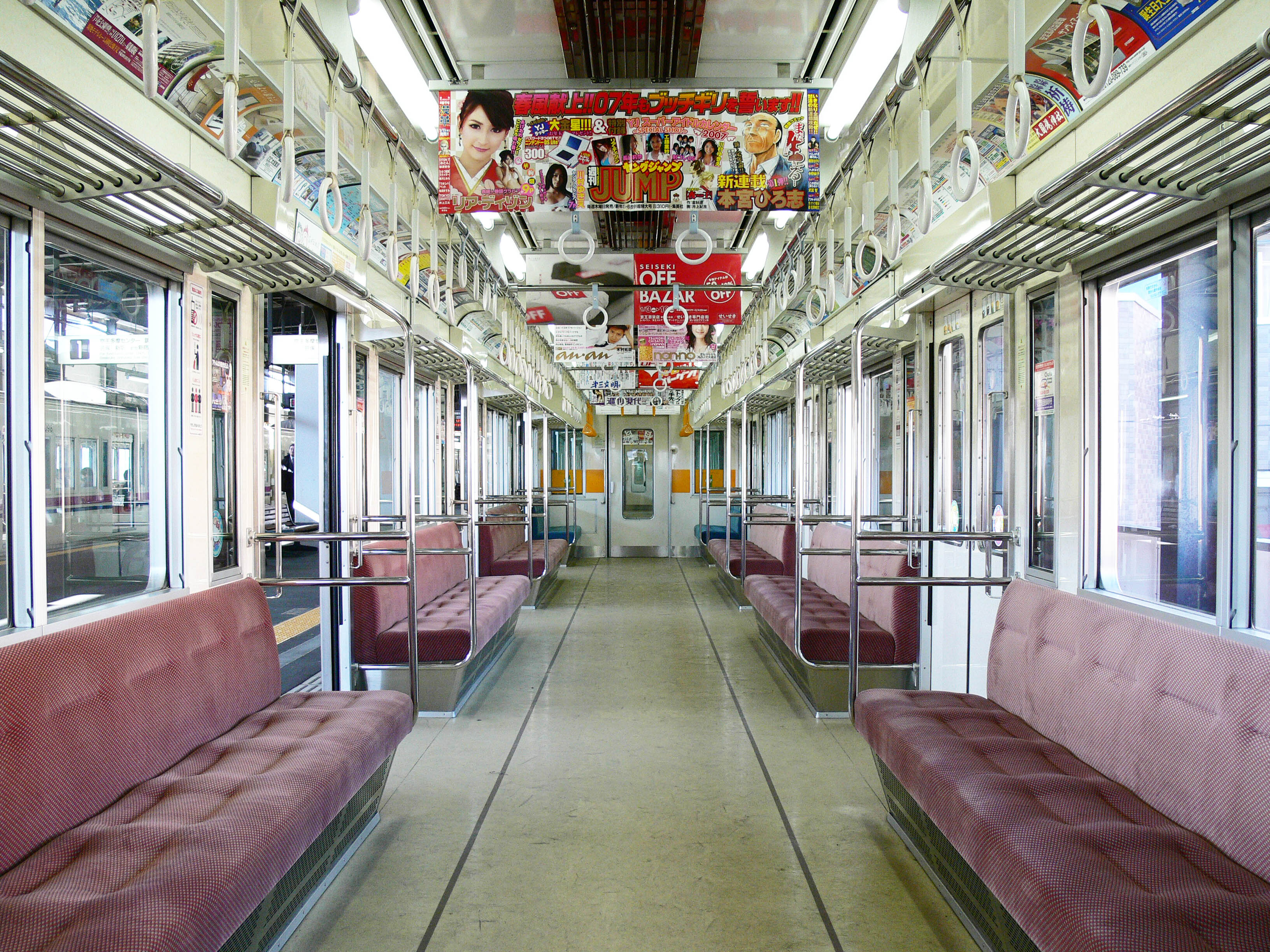
Interior of car in original condition

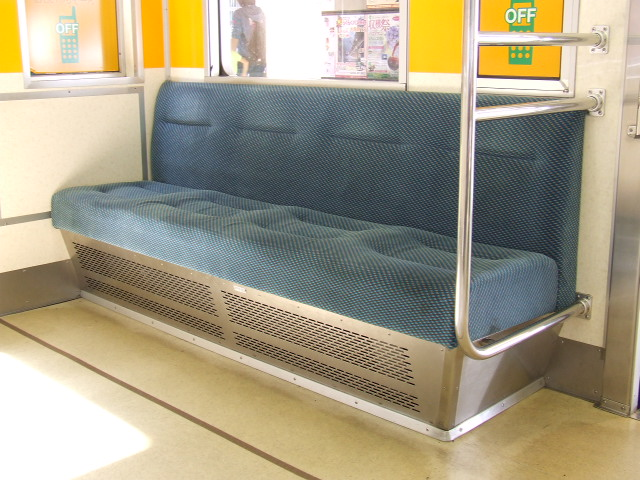
Priority seats of car in original condition

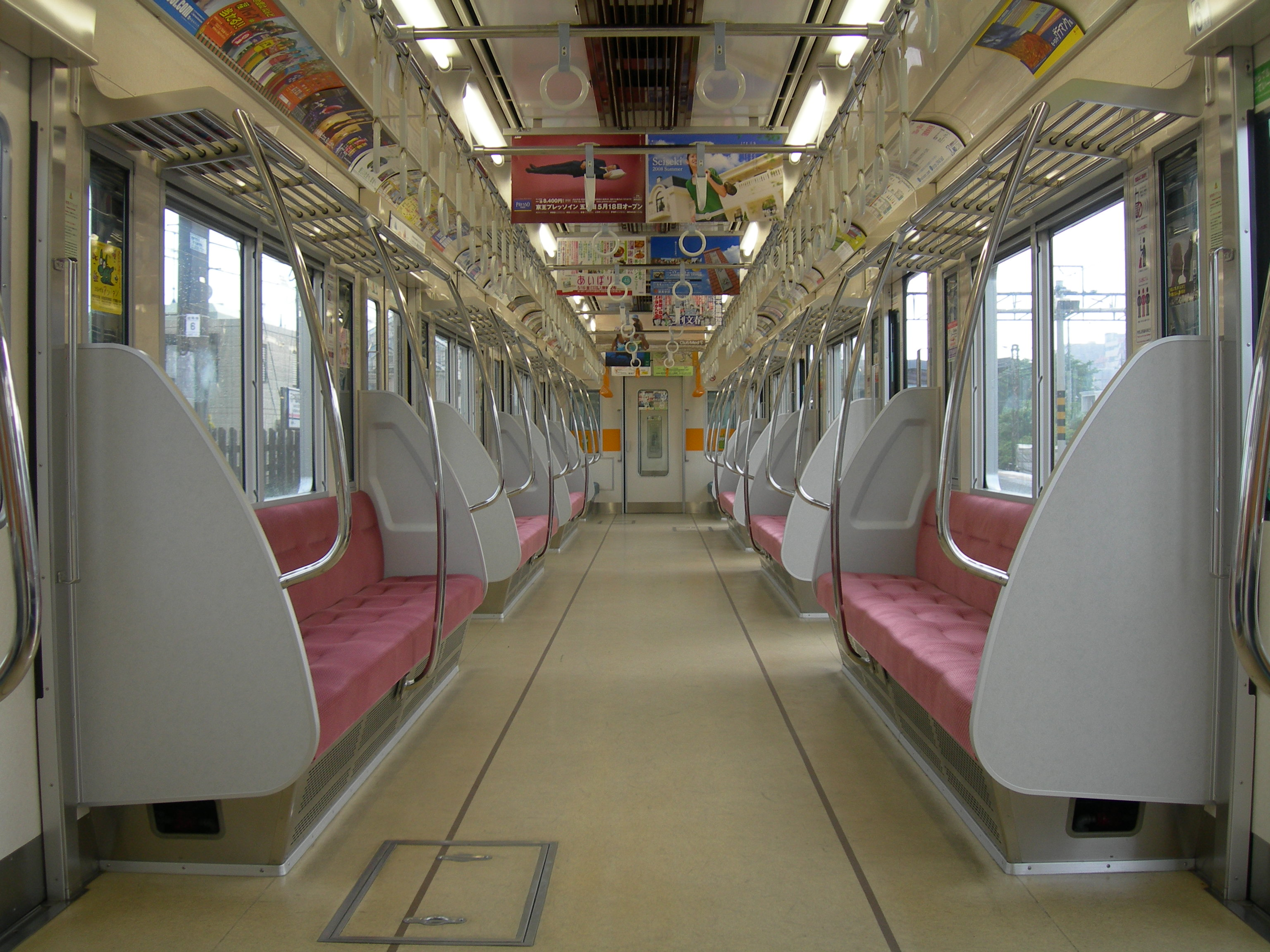
Interior of a refurbished car

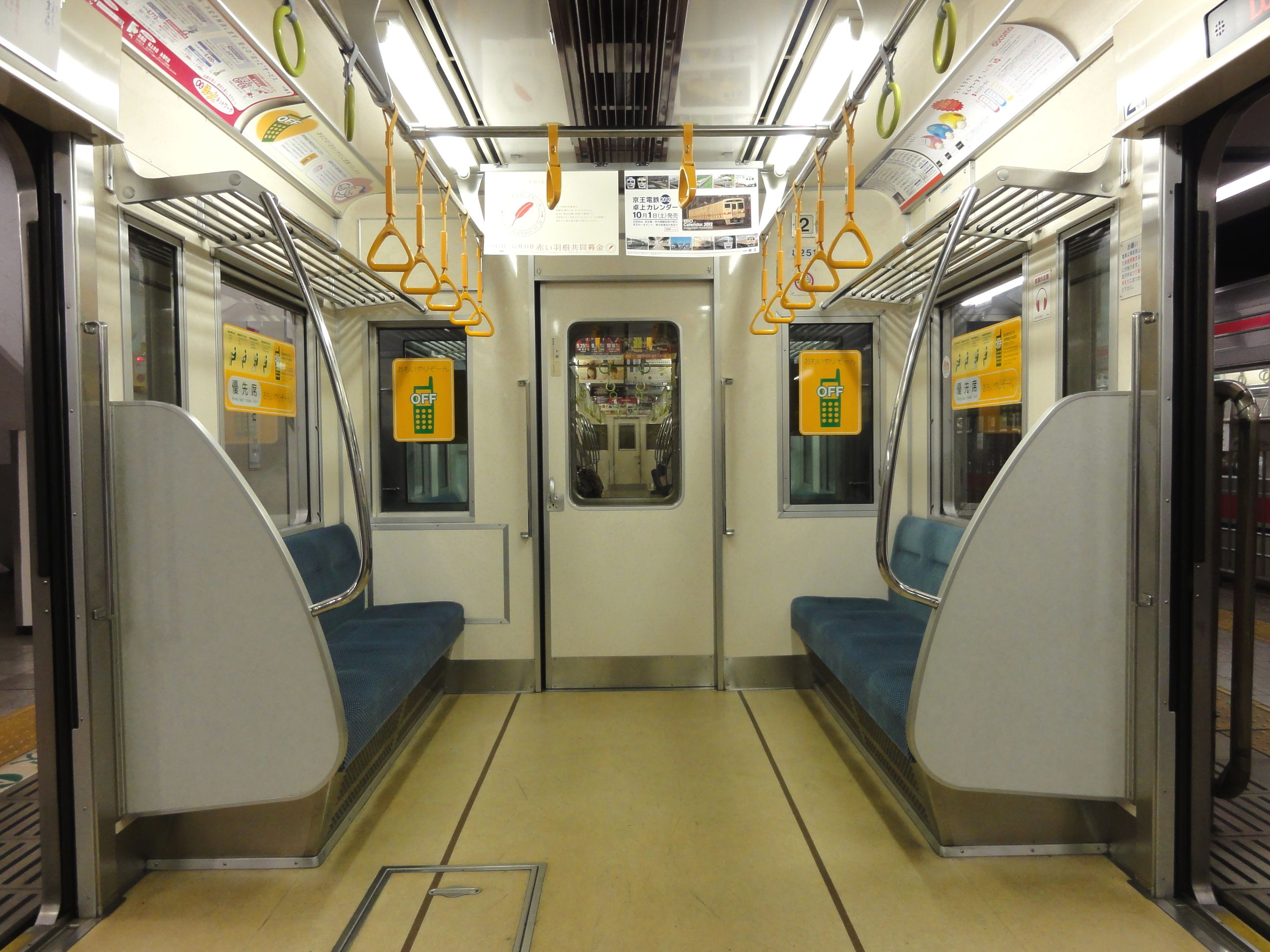
Priority seats of a refurbished car

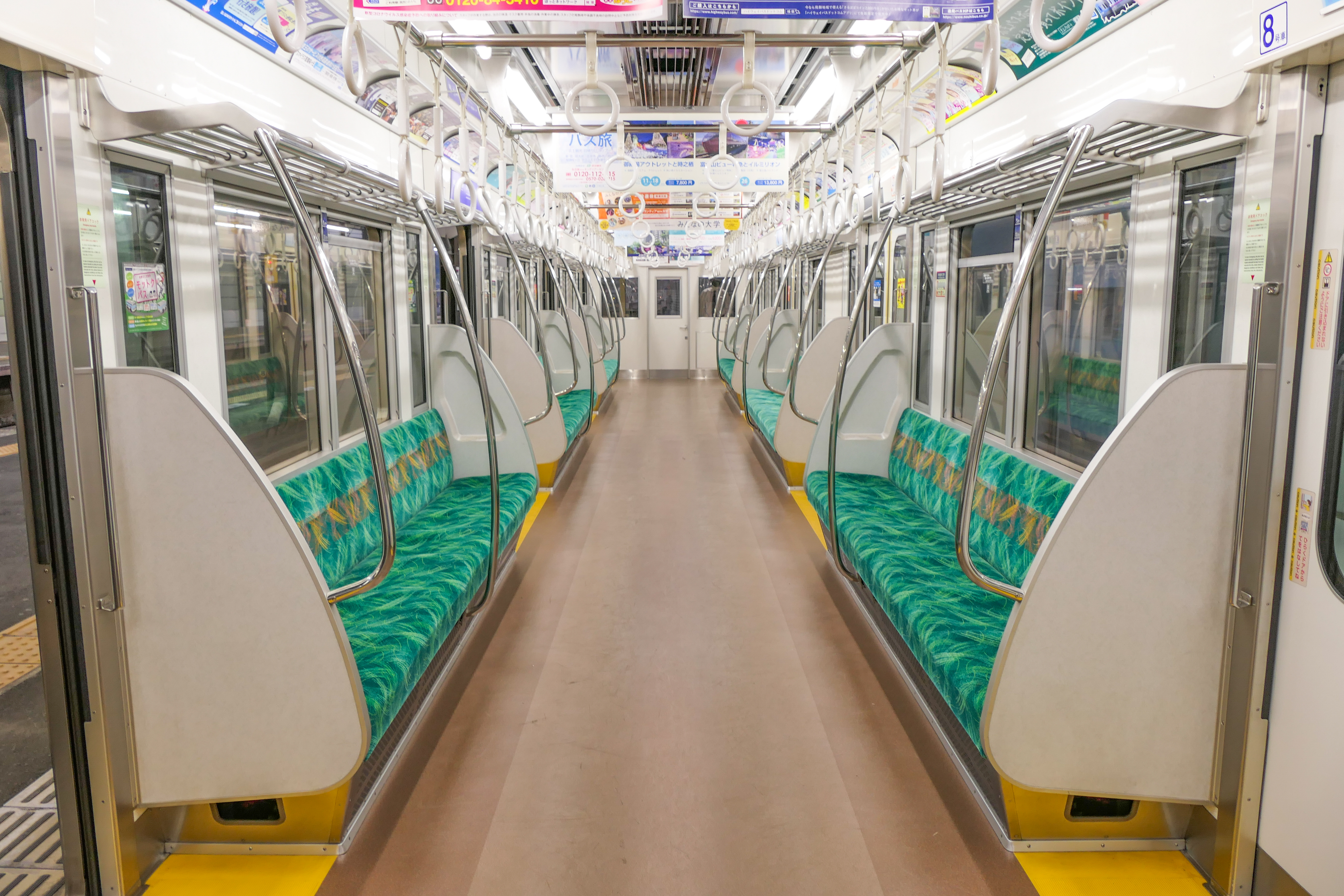
Interior of a renewal car

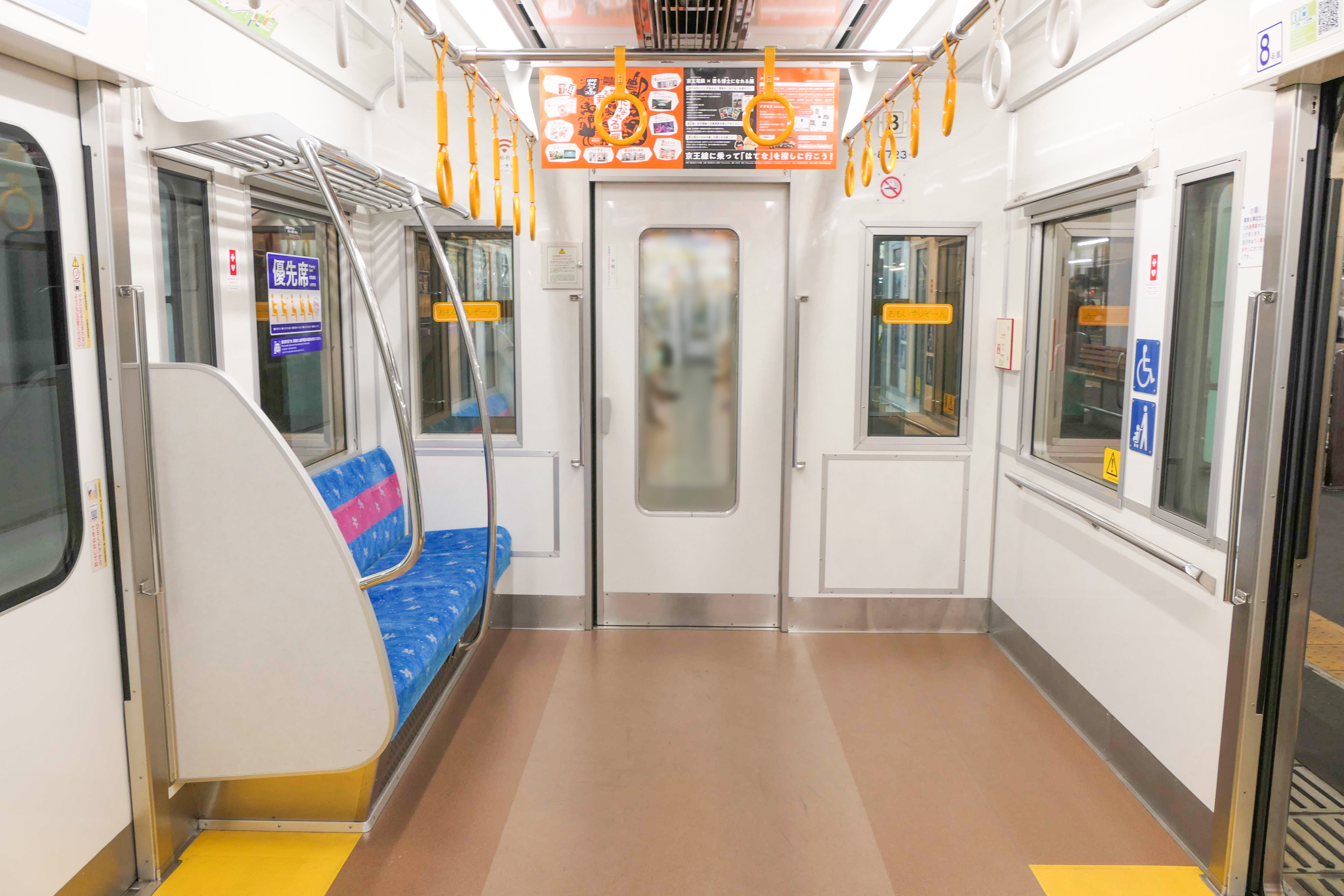
Priority seats of a renewal car

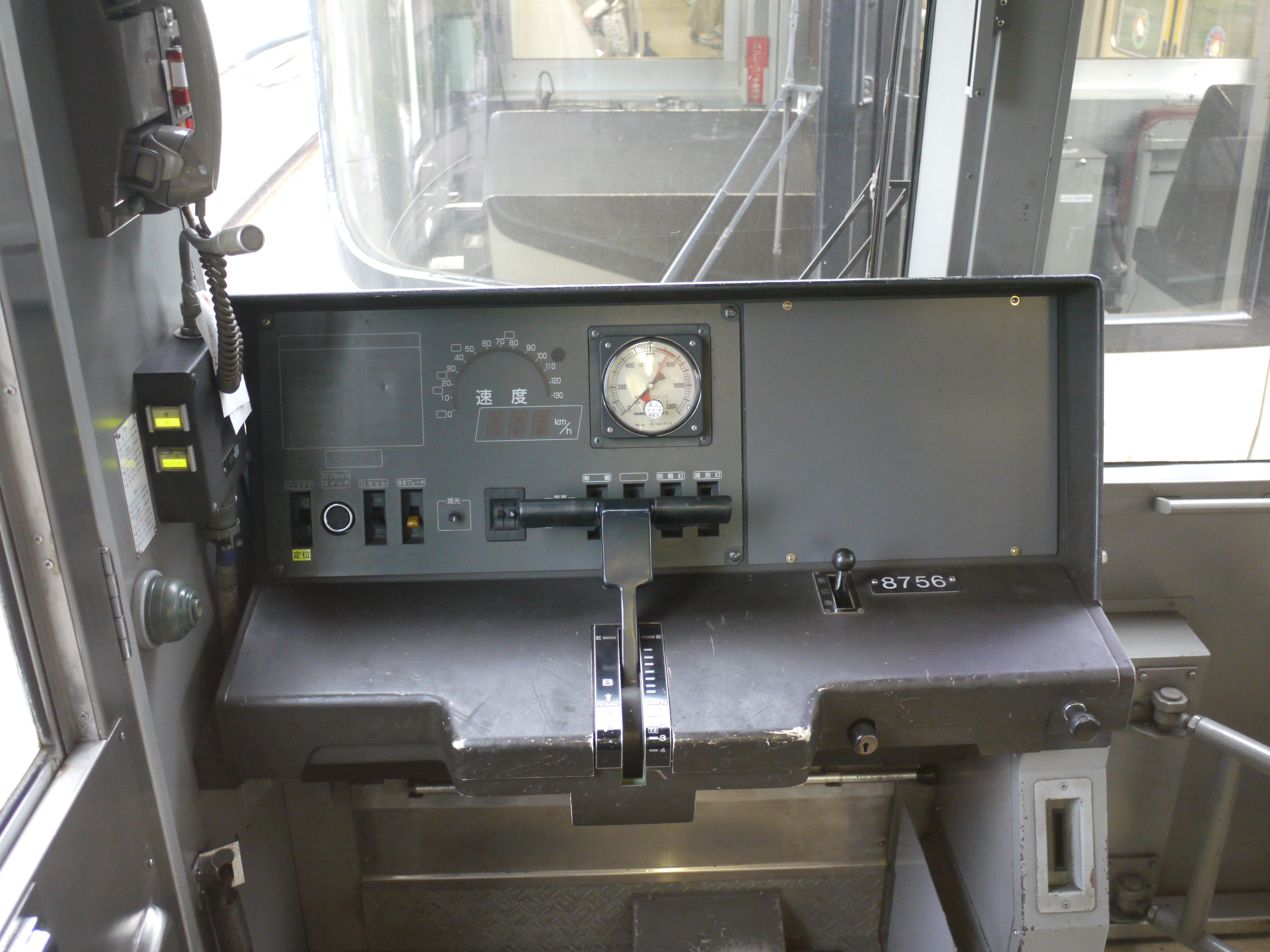
Driver's cab

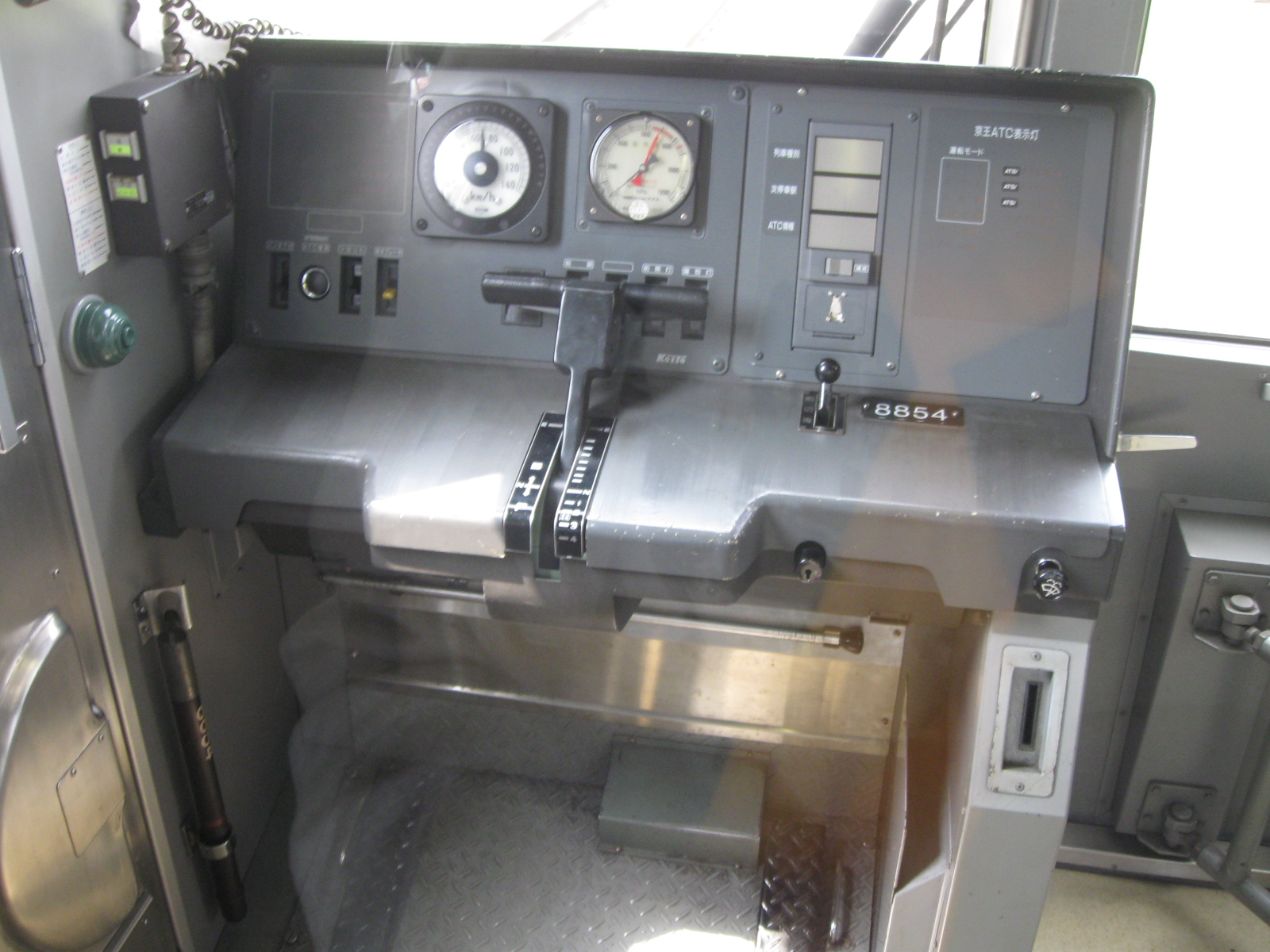
Driver's cab with analog speedometer

== History ==
The first 8000 series trains were introduced in 1992.

Six-car and four-cars sets (and occasionally a pair of four-car sets) used to be operated on splitting services which separated and re-joined at Takahatafudō Station until 2006. From 2013 to 2019, all six- and four-car 0-subseries sets underwent a refurbishment program. Among several technical upgrades, the cabs of the two inner ends were removed to form 10-car sets.

The 8000 series trains are used exclusively on Keio Corporation lines. Thus, unlike some other Keio trains, they do not continue past Shinjuku on to the Toei Shinjuku Line.

Set 8705F was involved on the October 2021 Tokyo attack.

== Special liveries ==
Set 8713 received a special all-over green livery in September 2009 evoking the livery carried by the former 2000 series trains.

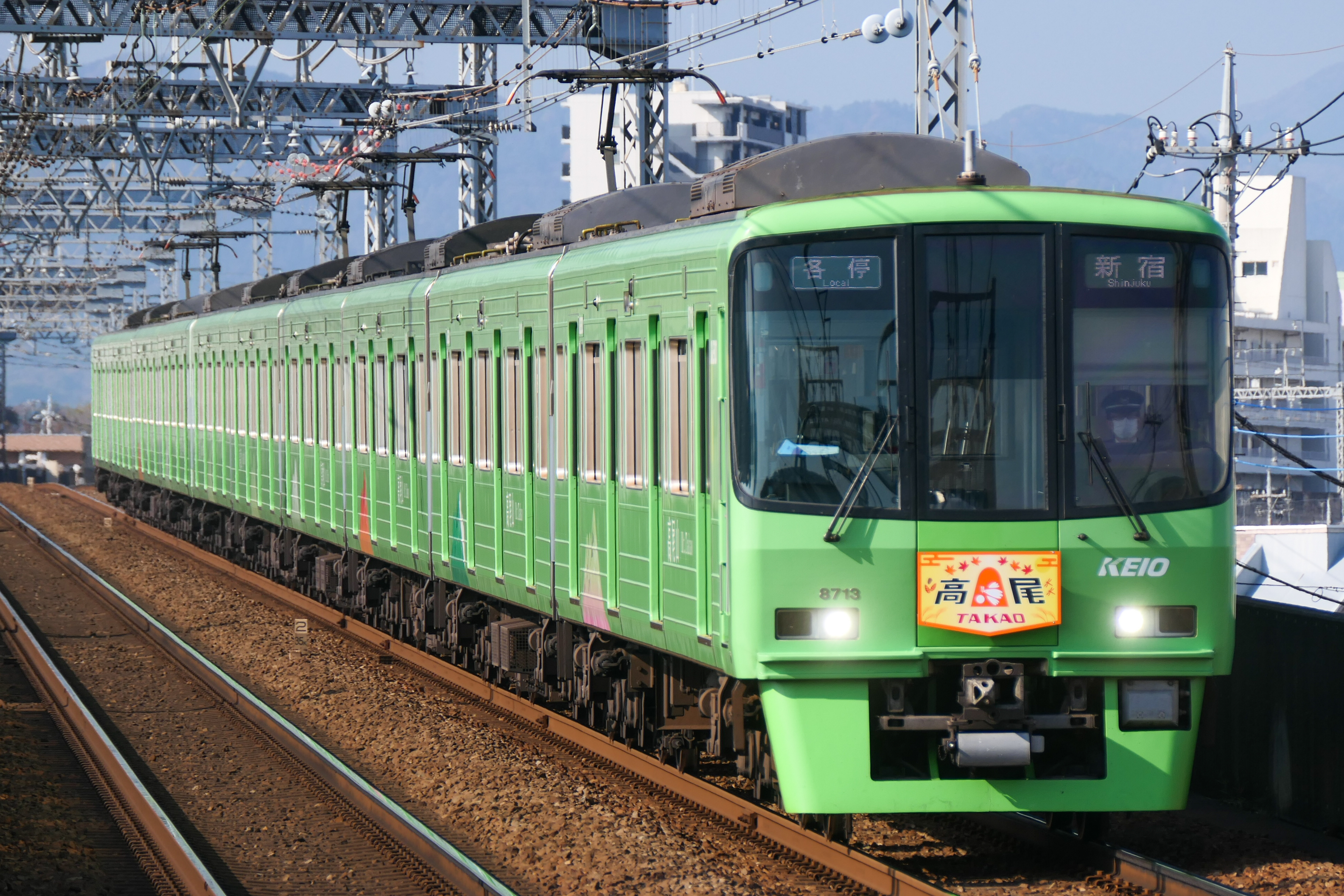
Set 8713 in special all-over green livery in November 2021
