= Fujikyu 8000 series =

Japanese train type

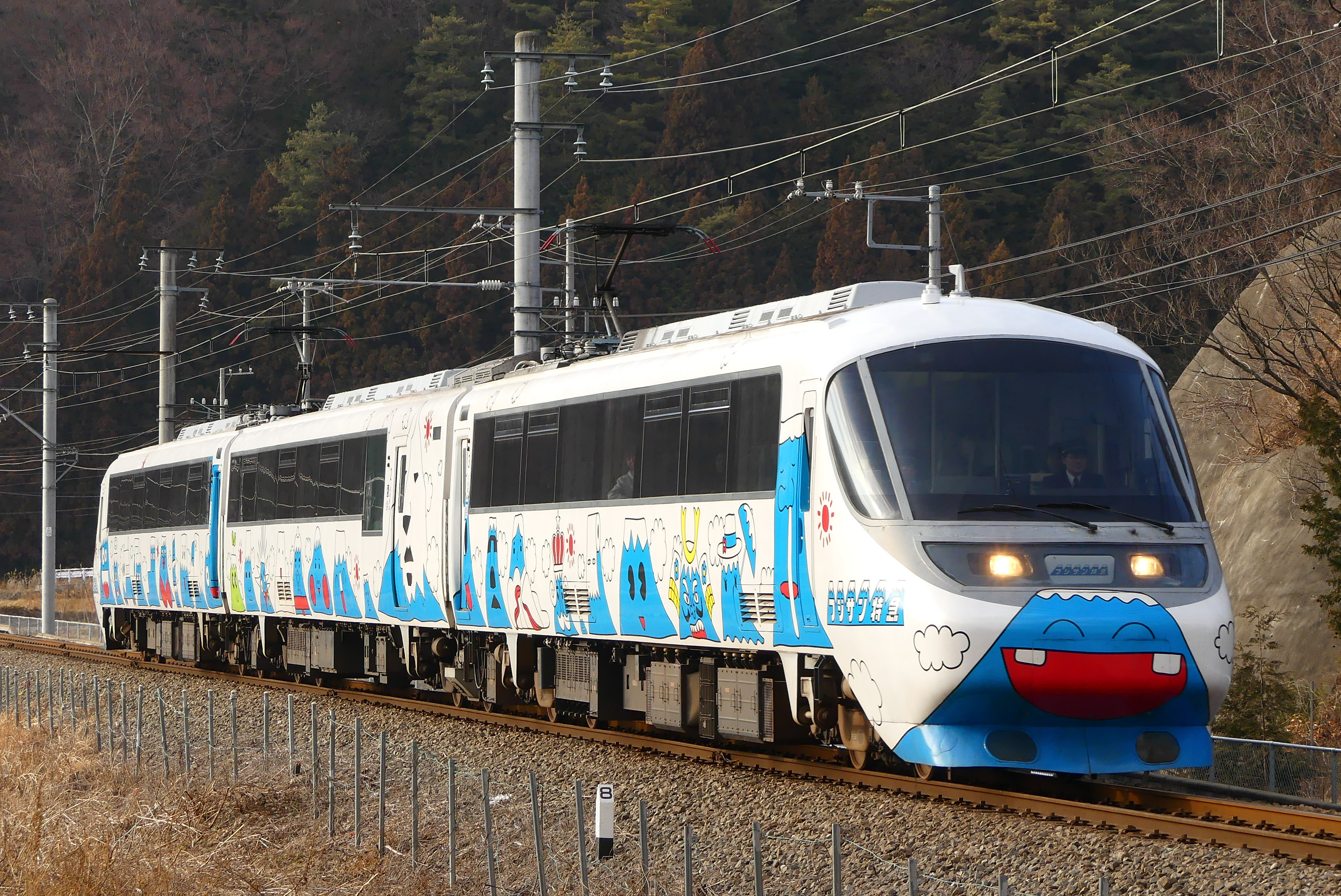
- The 8000 series train in January 2018
- In service: July 2014 – present
- Replaced: 2000 series
- Entered service: 12 July 2014
- Refurbished: 2013-2014
- Number built: 3 cars (1 set)
- Number in service: 3 cars (1 set)
- Formation: 3 cars per set
- Capacity: 160
- Operator: Fujikyu
- Line served: Fujikyuko Line

Specifications
- Car body construction: Steel
- Car length: 20,650 mm (67 ft 9 in) (end cars); 19,500 mm (64 ft 0 in) (intermediate car)
- Width: 2,900 mm (9 ft 6 in)
- Height: 4,050 mm (13 ft 3 in)
- Doors: 1 per side
- Maximum speed: 120 km/h (75 mph)
- Electric system: 1,500 V DC overhead wire
- Track gauge: 1,067 mm (3 ft 6 in)

The Fujikyu 8000 series (富士急行8000系, Fuji Kyūkō 8000-kei) is a DC electric multiple unit (EMU) train type operated by the private railway operator Fuji Kyuko (Fujikyu) on Fujisan Limited Express (フジサン特急, Fujisan Tokkyū) limited-stop services on the Fujikyuko Line in Yamanashi Prefecture, Japan, since July 2014.

== Design ==
The three-car train was converted from a former Odakyu 20000 series RSE 7-car "Romancecar" EMU built in 1991, withdrawn in March 2012, and purchased by Fujikyu in November 2013. Like the 2000 series trains it supersedes, the exterior of the train is covered in "Mount Fuji" caricatures. The train has a maximum operating speed of 120 km/h (75 mph), but is limited to 60 km/h (37 mph) on the Fujikyuko Line.

== Operations ==
The 8000 series train operates on Fujisan Limited Express limited-stop services on the 26.6 km (16.5 mi) Fujikyuko Line in Yamanashi Prefecture, which runs between Ōtsuki and Kawaguchiko. The train replaced one of the operator's 2000 series sets, which were both rebuilt from the former JR East 165 series Panorama Express Alps Joyful Train excursion EMU sets.

== Formation ==
The sole three-car set is formed as shown below, with car 1 at the Fujisan end.

Car No.	1	2	3
Designation	Msc1	Ts	Msc2
Numbering	KuMoRo 8001	SaRo 8101	KuMoRo 8051
Weight (t)	44.1	37.3	45.2
Seating capacity	45	55	60

- KuMoRo 8001 was converted from former Odakyu car DeHa 20002, SaRo 8101 was converted from former SaHa 200052, and KuMoRo 8051 was converted from former DeHa 20302.
- Car 1 is designated as an observation car requiring payment of a supplementary fare, while cars 2 and 3 are designated as non-reserved seating.
- Cars 1 and 3 are each fitted with an FPS33F single-arm pantograph.
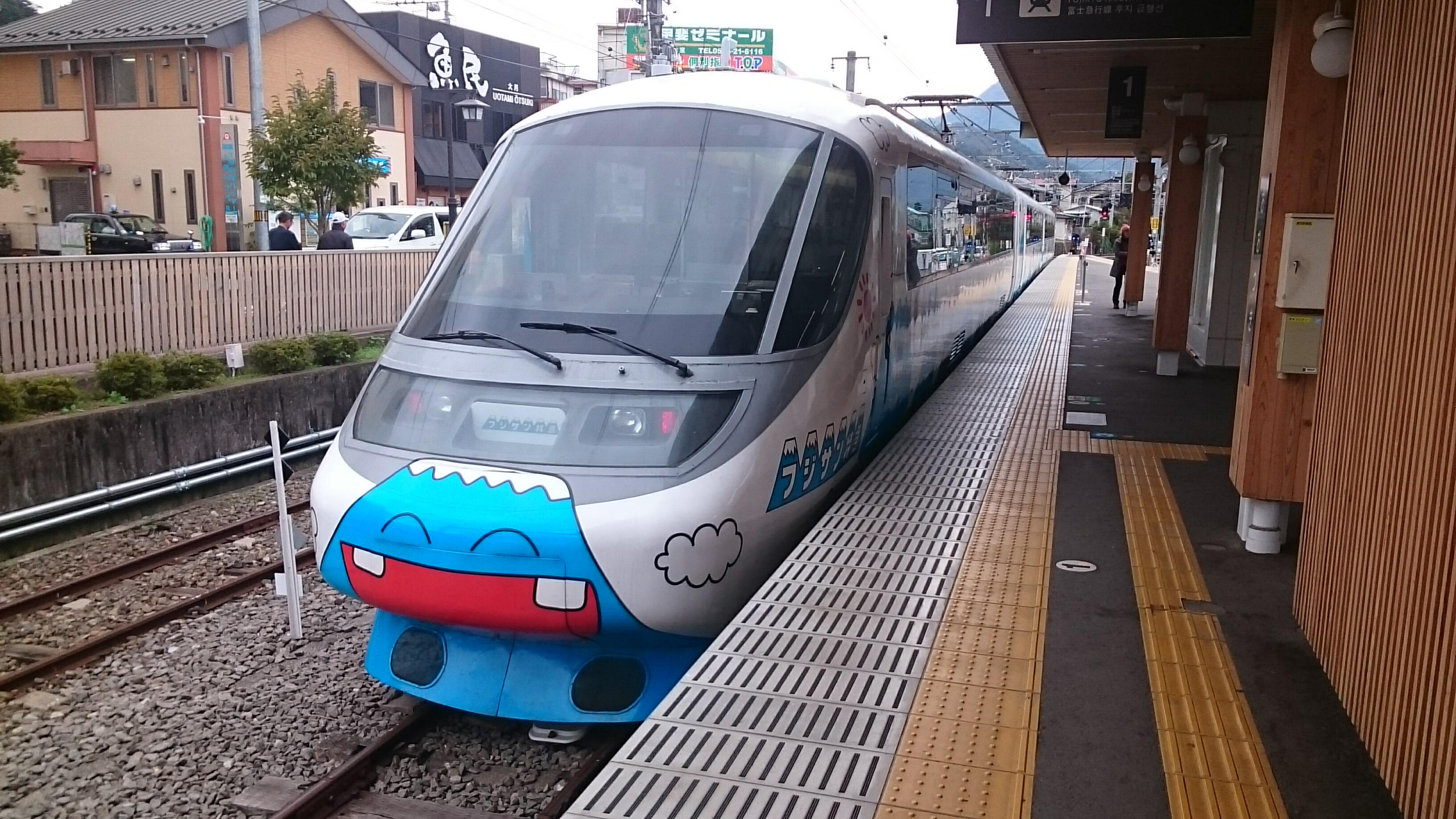
Fujikyuko 8000 series EMU in Ōtsuki Station

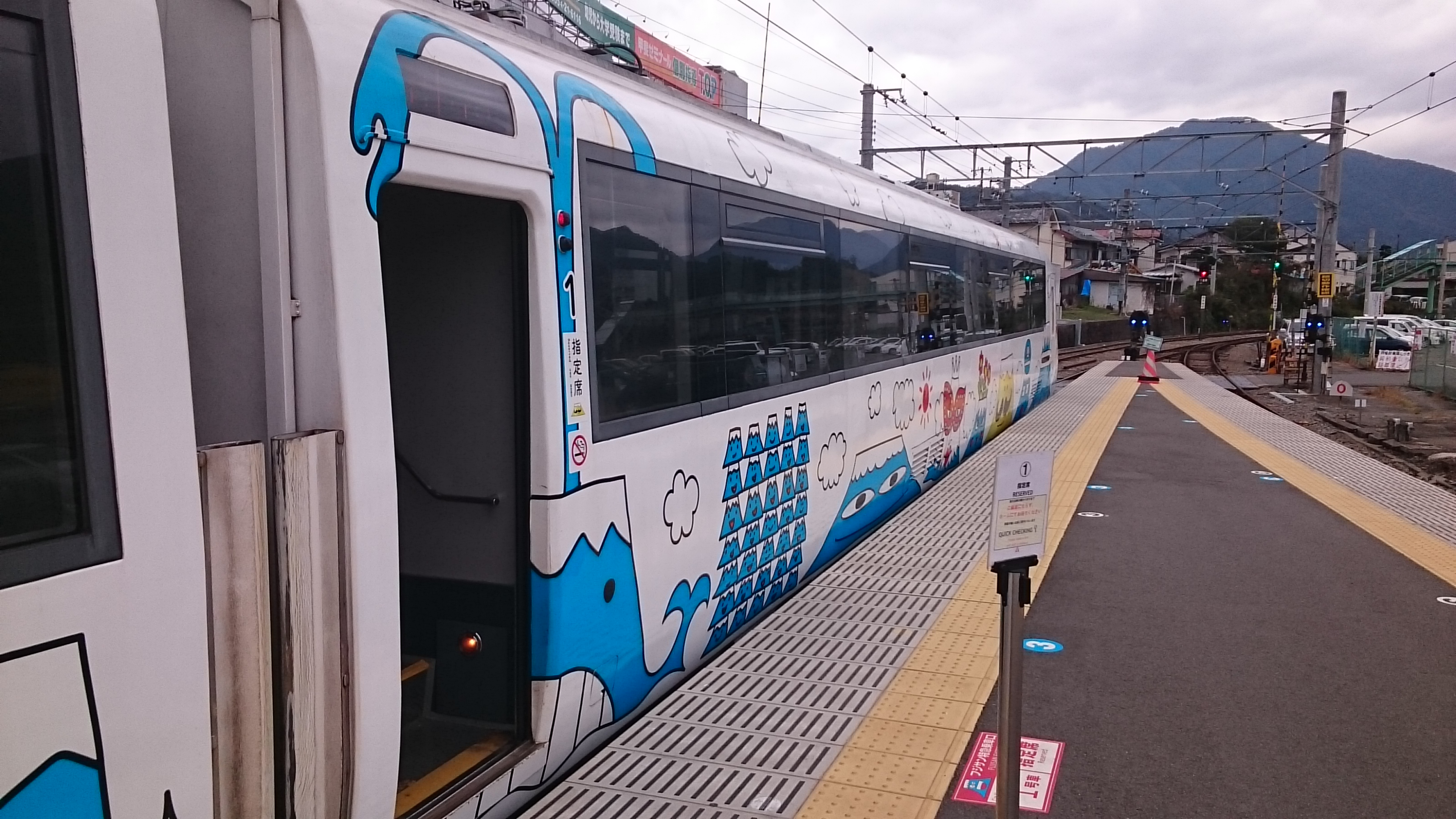
Fujikyuko 8000 series car 1

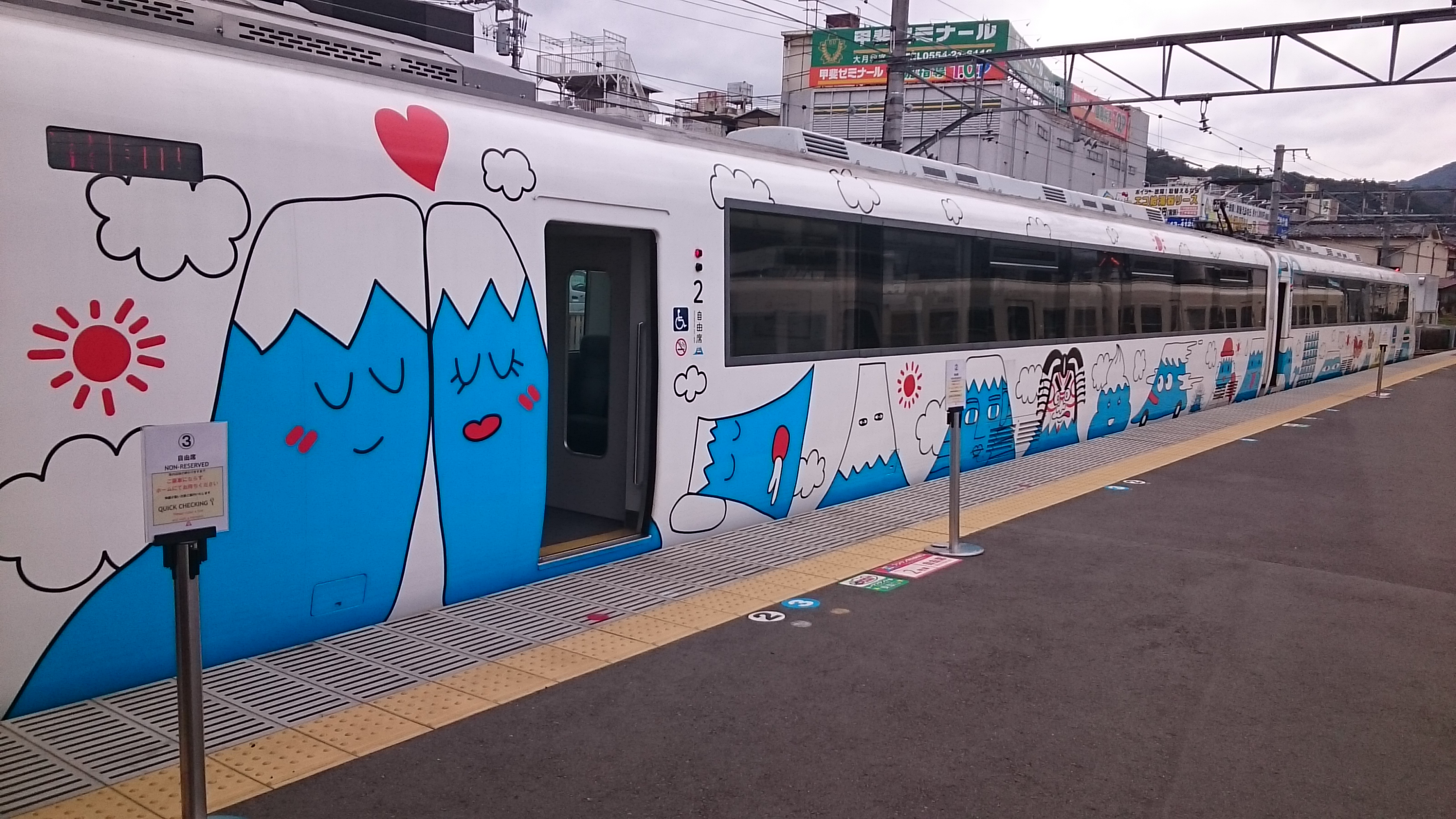
Fujikyuko 8000 series car 2

== Interior ==
Car 1 has an observation lounge area with sofa seating immediately behind the driver's position. The main part of the saloon has rotating unidirectional reclining seating arranged 2+1 abreast with a seat pitch of 1,000 mm (39 in). Fixed 4-person facing seating bays with tables are situated at the end of the car. Cars 2 and 3 have rotating unidirectional reclining seating arranged 2+2 abreast with a seat pitch of 1,000 mm (39 in). Car 2 has a wheelchair-accessible seating area and a universal access toilet.

== History ==
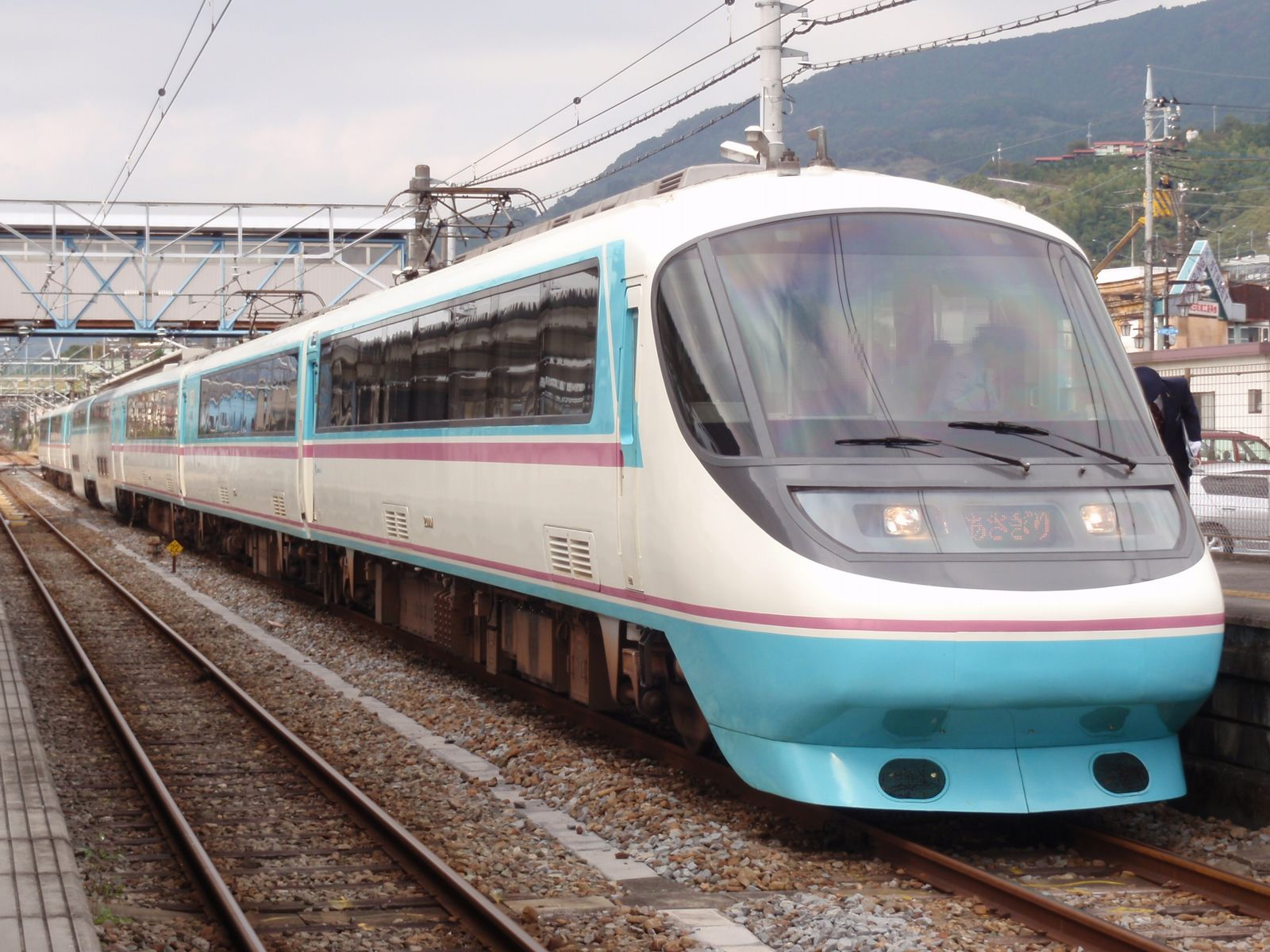
An Odakyu 20000 series "RSE" train in October 2009

Fujikyu first announced in January 2012 that it intended to purchase a former Odakyu 20000 series RSE EMU set following its retirement in March of that year. All seven cars of the former set 20002 were moved to the Nippon Sharyo factory in Toyokawa, Aichi, in November 2013 for conversion work. Following conversion, the reformed 3-car train was moved to Fujikyu in April 2014.

Between April and May 2014, Fujikyu held a public vote for the Mount Fuji caricatures to be used on the exterior of the new train, with 44 different designs selected together with 14 new designs submitted by the general public.

Test running of the train still in plain all-over white livery commenced in June 2014. The 8000 series set entered revenue service from 12 July 2014.
