= 371 series =

Japanese train type

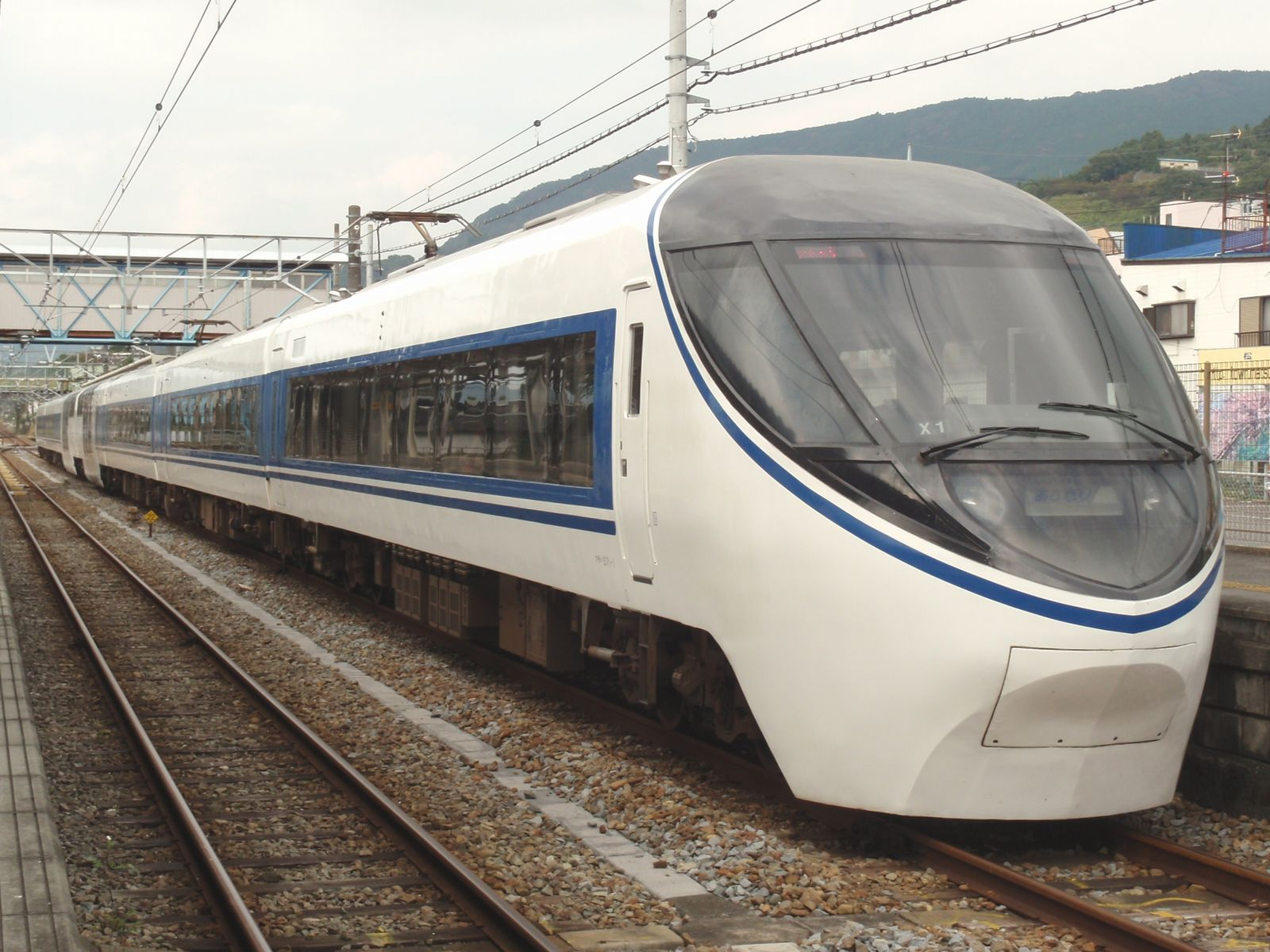
- 371 series on an Asagiri service, October 2009
- In service: March 1991 – November 2014
- Manufacturers: Hitachi, Kawasaki Heavy Industries, Nippon Sharyo
- Number built: 7 vehicles (1 set)
- Formation: 7 cars
- Fleet numbers: X1
- Operator: JR Central
- Depot: Shizuoka

Specifications
- Car body construction: Steel
- Car length: 21.250 m (69 ft 9 in) (end cars); 20.000 m (65 ft 7 in) (intermediate cars)
- Width: 2,900 mm (9 ft 6 in)
- Doors: Sliding plug doors (1 per side)
- Maximum speed: 120 km/h (75 mph)
- Traction system: Resistor control + field system superimposed field excitation control
- Electric system: 1,500 V DC
- Current collection: C-PS27A single-arm pantograph
- Safety system: ATS-P_{T}
- Track gauge: 1,067 mm (3 ft 6 in)

The 371 series (371系電車) was an electric multiple unit (EMU) train operated by Central Japan Railway Company (JR Central) in Japan between 1991 and 2014. Originally used on Asagiri limited express services in conjunction with Odakyu Electric Railway, from 2012 until its withdrawal in 2014, the train was used on Gotemba Line excursion services. It was subsequently sold to the private railway operator Fuji Kyuko and rebuilt as the Fujikyu 8500 series for use on Fujisan Tokkyu services from March 2016.

== Design ==
The lone 7-car 371 series set was built jointly by Hitachi, Kawasaki Heavy Industries, and Nippon Sharyo.

== Operations ==
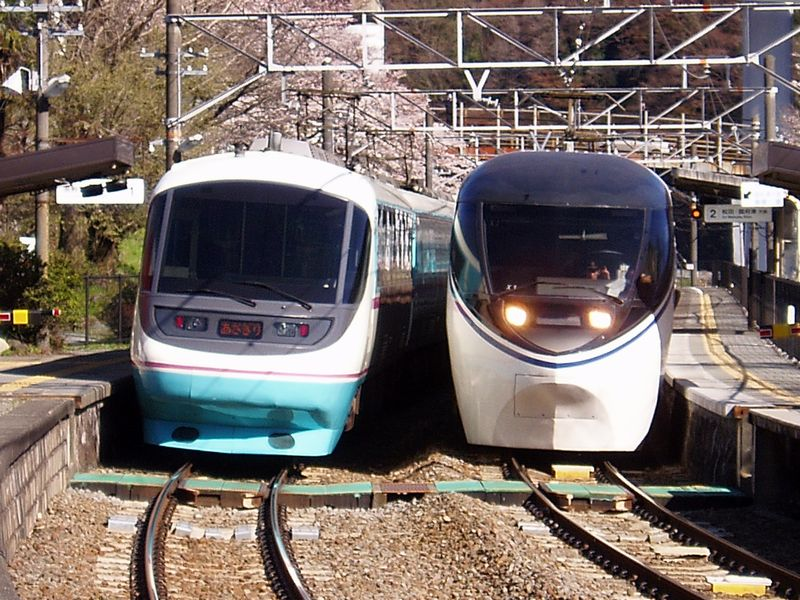
371 series (right) and Odakyu 20000 series RSE (left) EMUs on Asagiri services, April 2008

From its introduction on 16 March 1991 until 16 March 2012, the 371 series set was used alongside the two Odakyu 20000 series RSE EMUs on Asagiri services run jointly by the private railway operator Odakyu Electric Railway and JR Central between Odakyu's Tokyo terminus at Shinjuku and JR Central's Numazu Station in Shizuoka Prefecture via the Gotemba Line. In addition to the daytime Asagiri services, the train was also used on the following "Home Liner" limited-stop commuter services.

- Home Liner Numazu
- Home Liner Hamamatsu
- Home Liner Shizuoka

From 17 March, the 371 series and 20000 series trains were replaced by Odakyu 60000 series MSE EMUs on Asagiri services.

From June 2012, the 371 series set was used on additional limited-stop "Rapid" services on the Gotemba Line connected with a series of hiking events.

== Formation ==
The one 7-car set, X1, was formed as follows. The two Green (first class) cars, 3 and 4, were bilevel cars.

Car No.	1	2	3	4	5	6	7
Designation	Mc	M'	ThsD	ThsD	M	M'	Mc
Numbering	KuMoHa 371-101	MoHa 370-101	SaRoHa 371-101	SaRoHa 371-1	MoHa 371-201	MoHa 370-1	KuMoHa 371-1

Cars 1, 5, and 7 are each fitted with one C-PS27A single-arm pantograph.

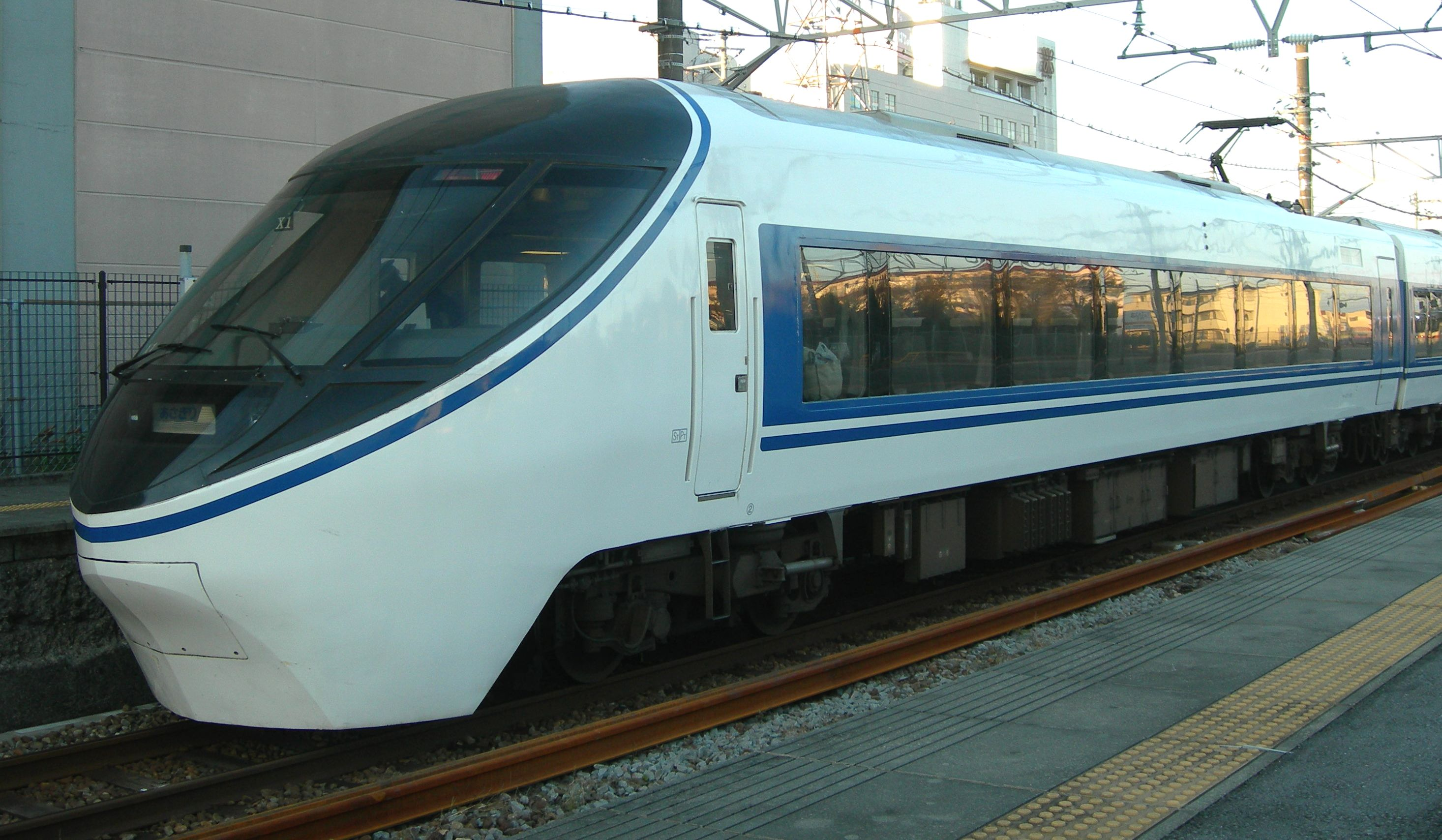
KuMoHa 371-101

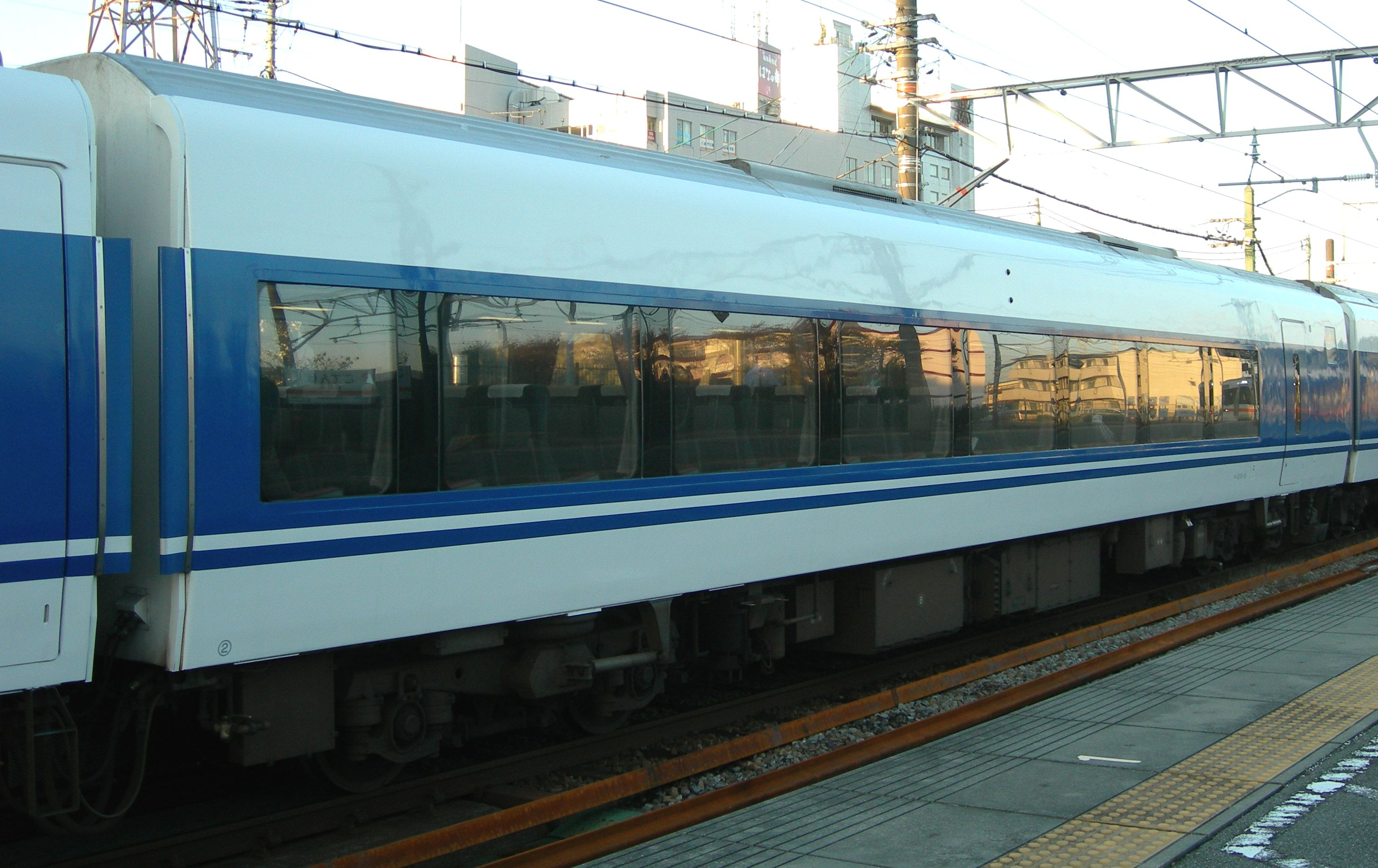
MoHa 370-101

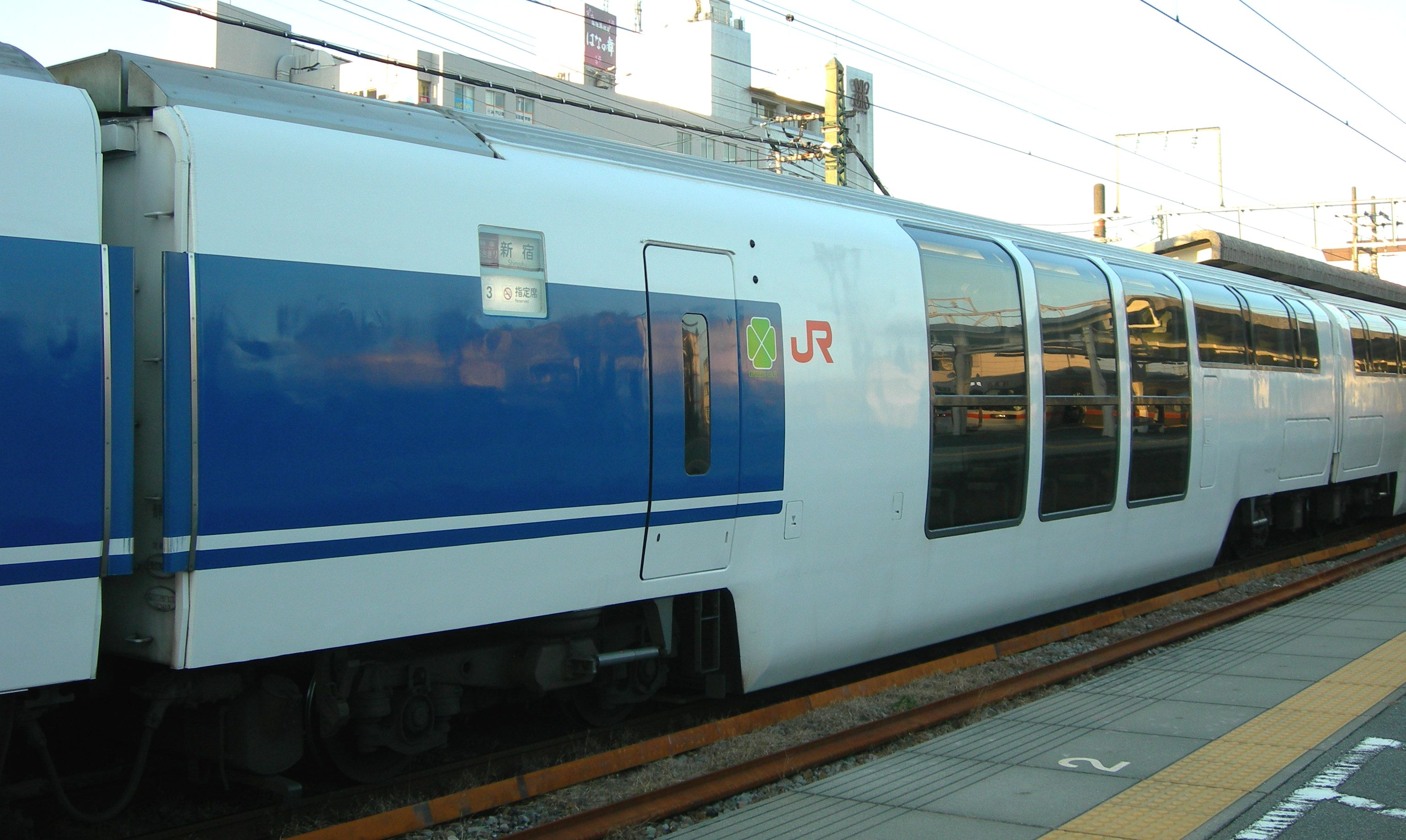
SaRoHa 371-101

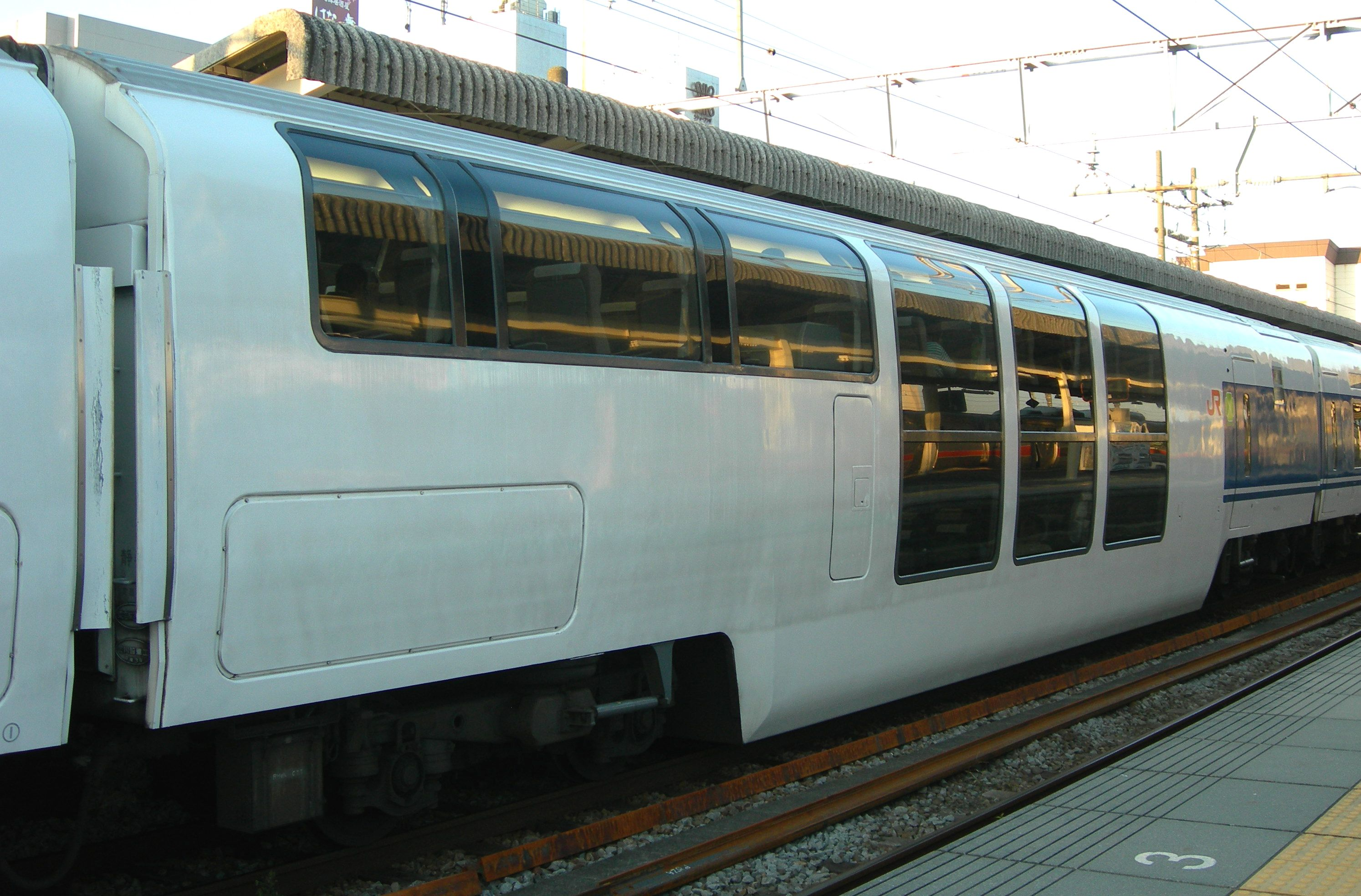
SaRoHa 371-1

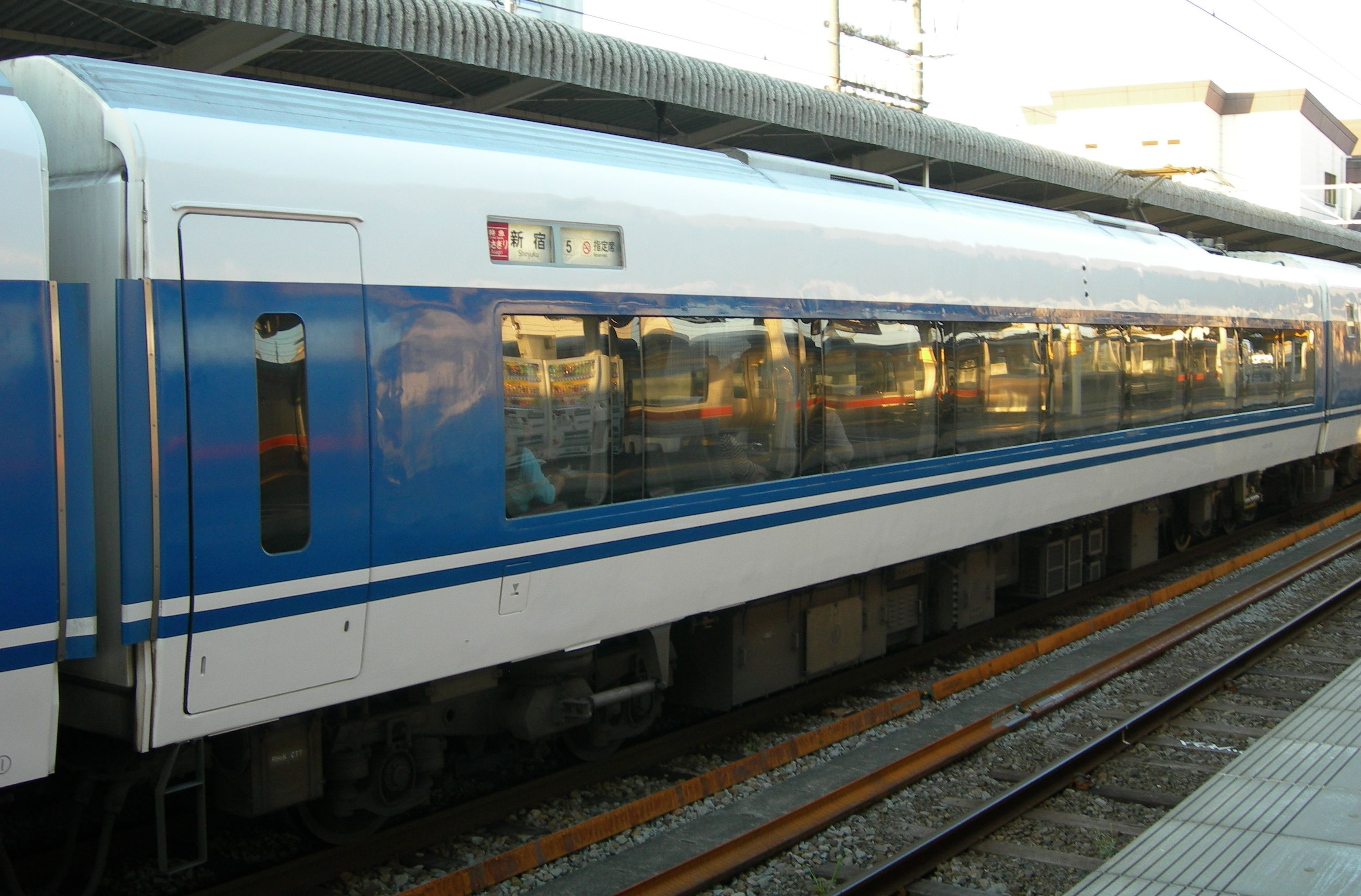
MoHa 371-201

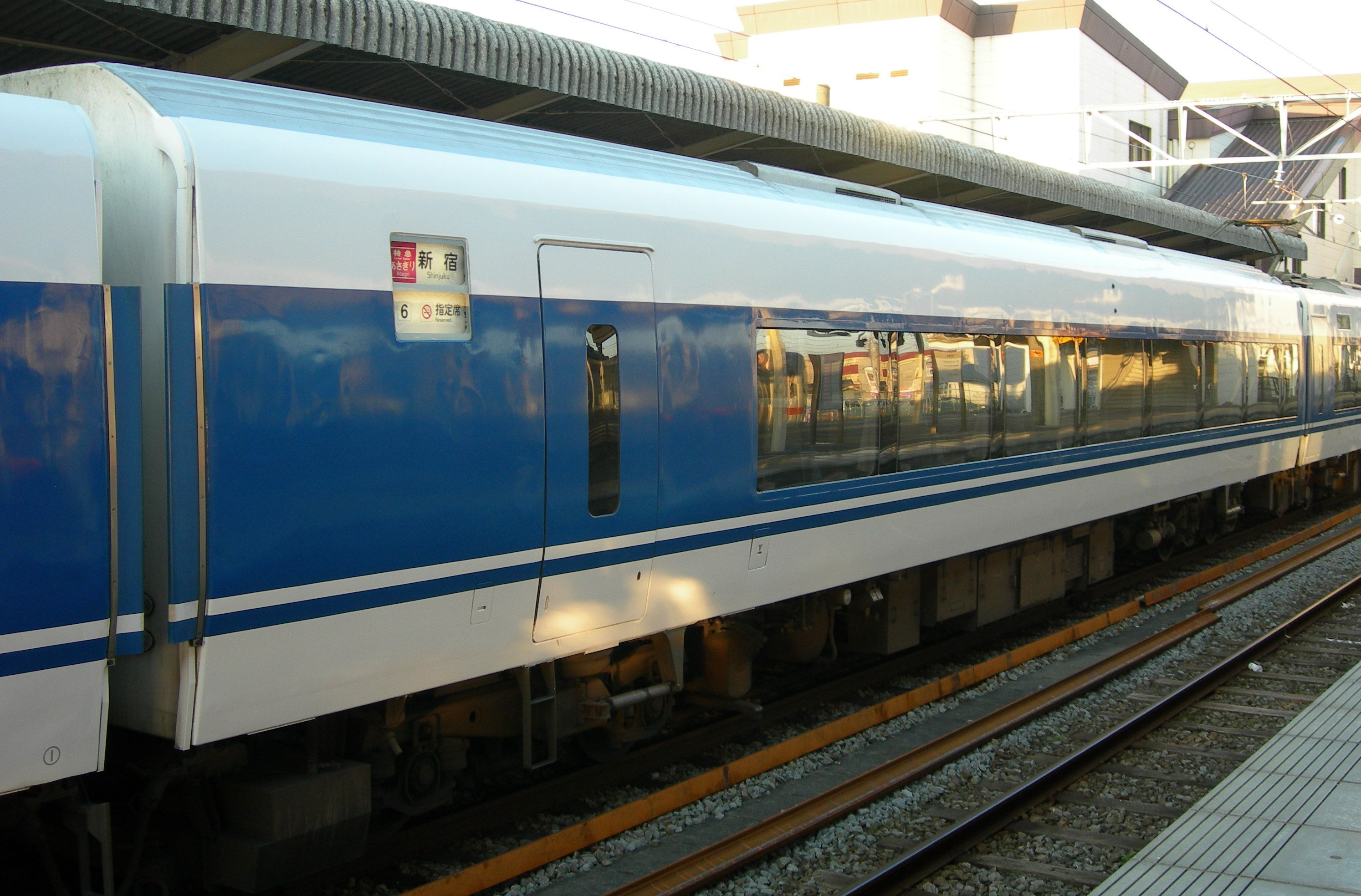
MoHa 370-1

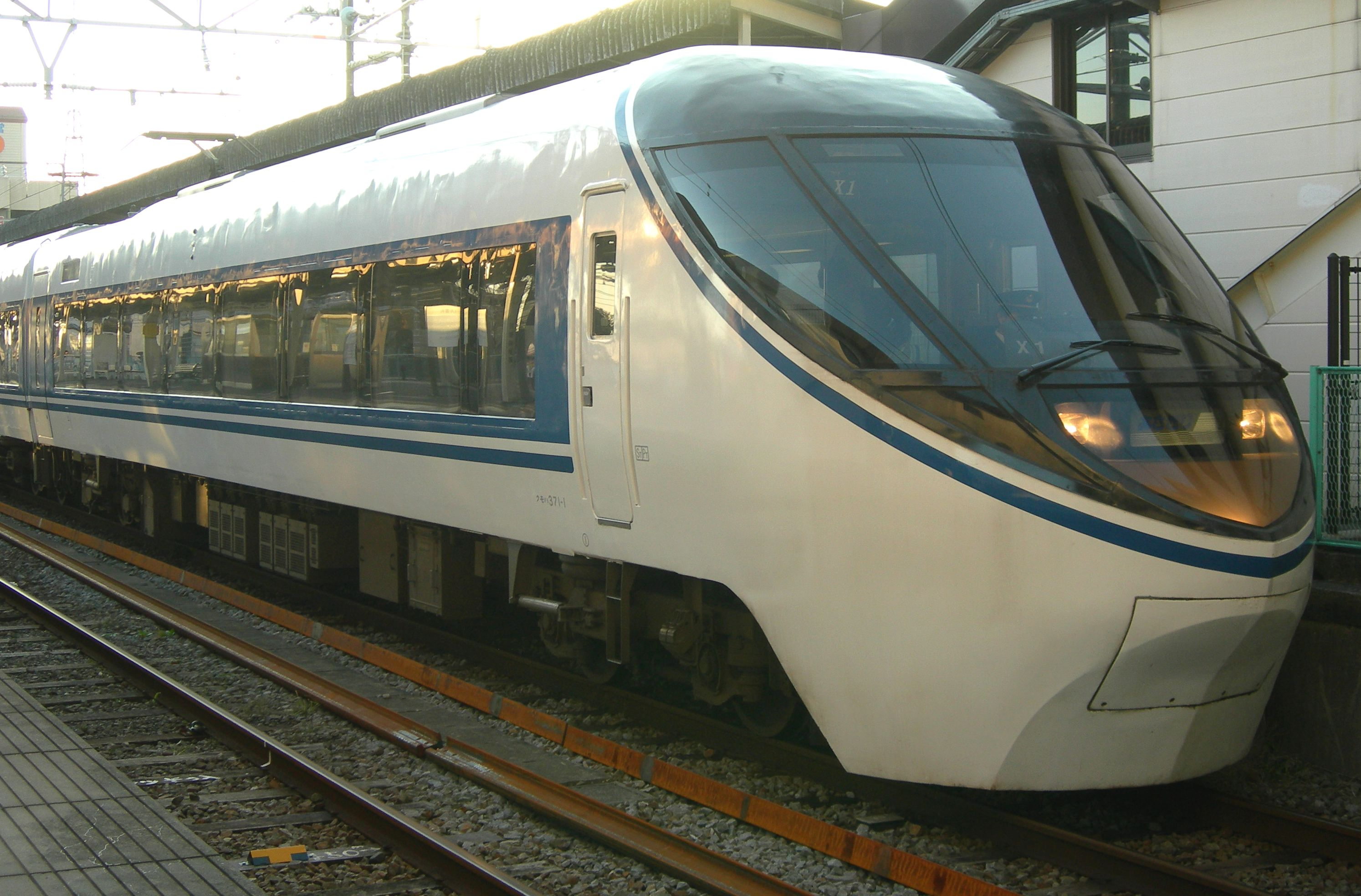
KuMoHa 371-1

== Interior ==
Standard class cars had regular 2+2 seating. The two bilevel cars had Green (first class) accommodation on the upper decks with 2+1 seating, and standard-class accommodation on the lower decks, also with 2+1 seating.

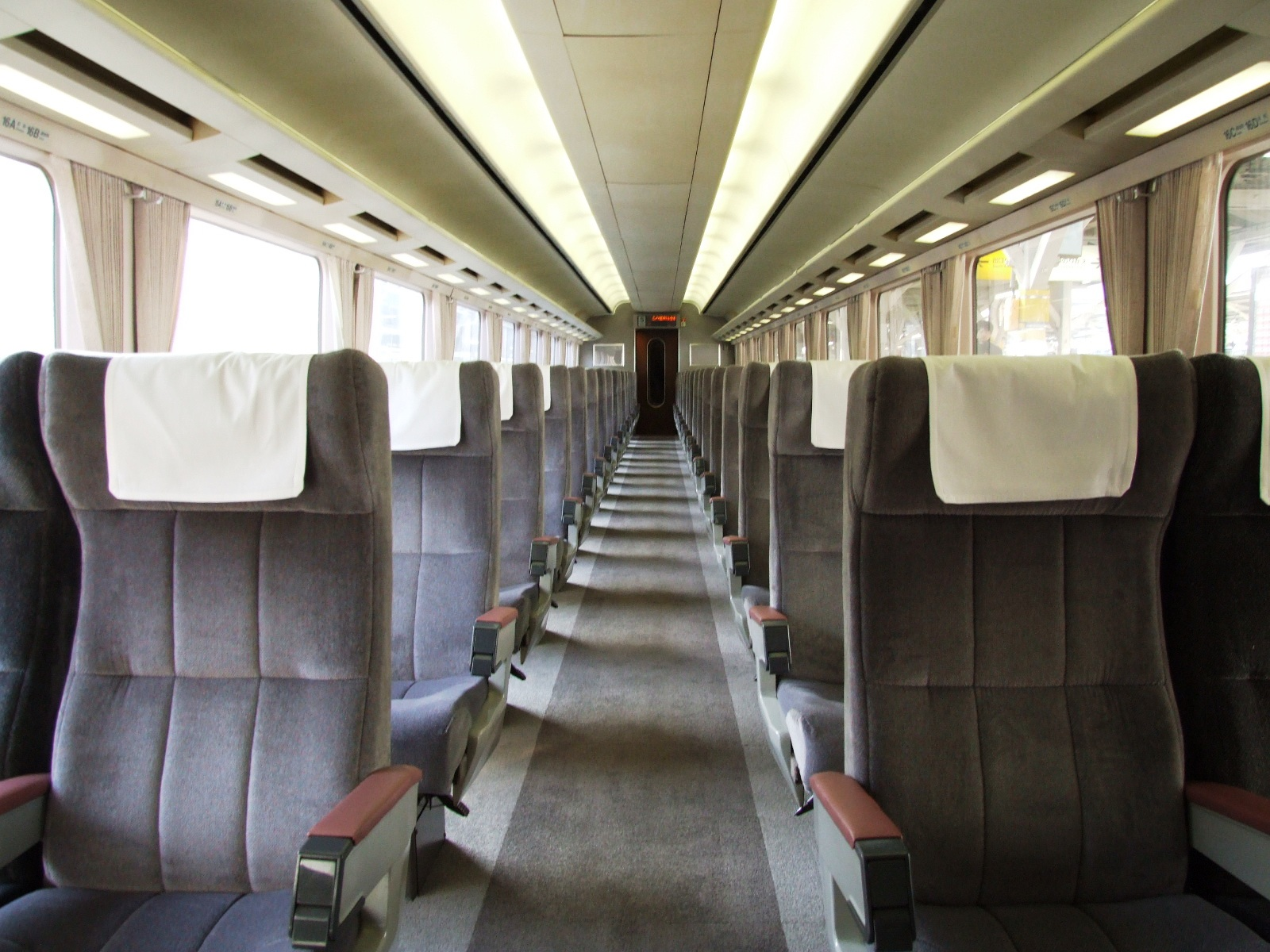
Standard class car interior, February 2009

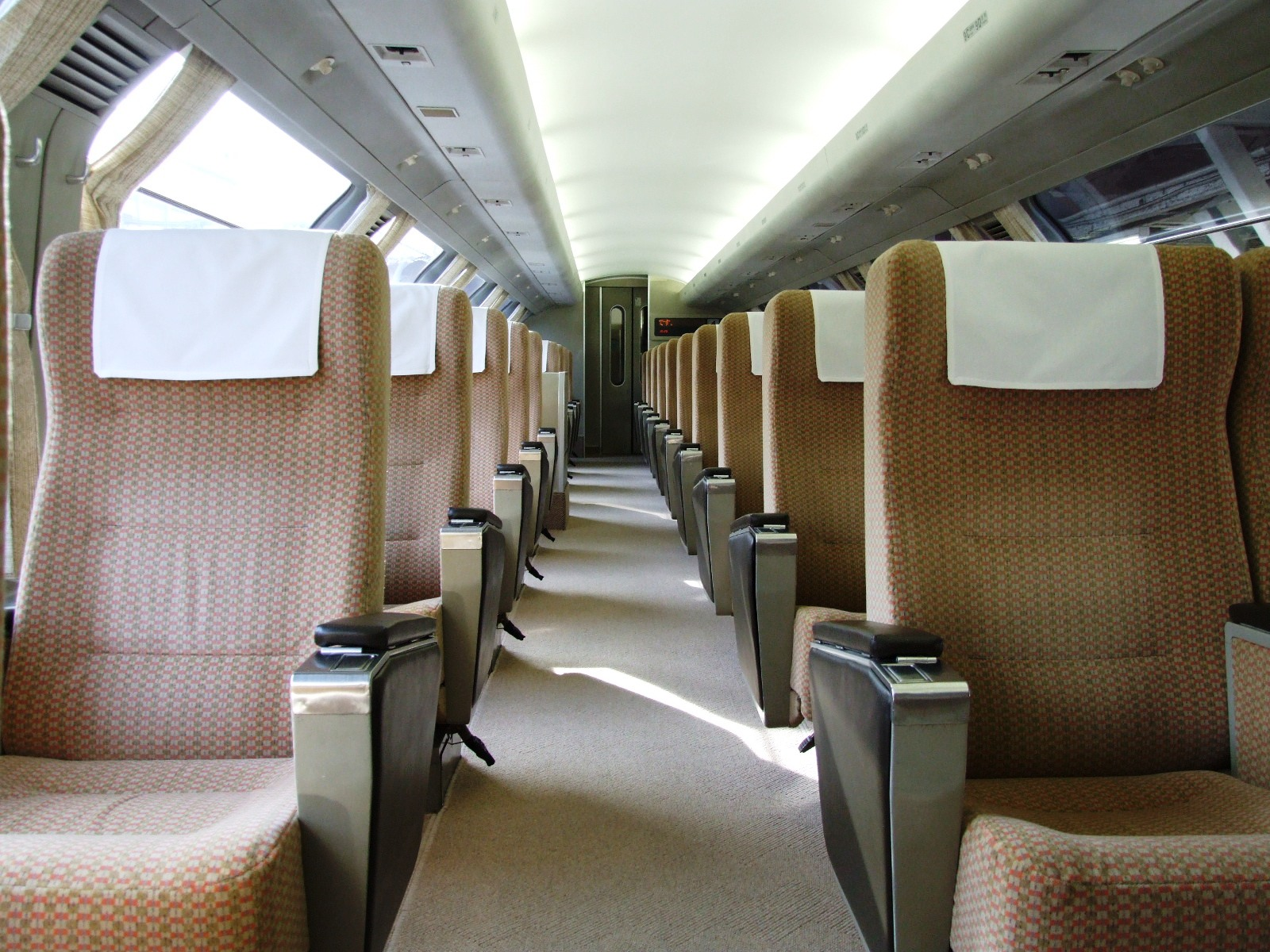
Bilevel car upper deck (Green class) accommodation, February 2009

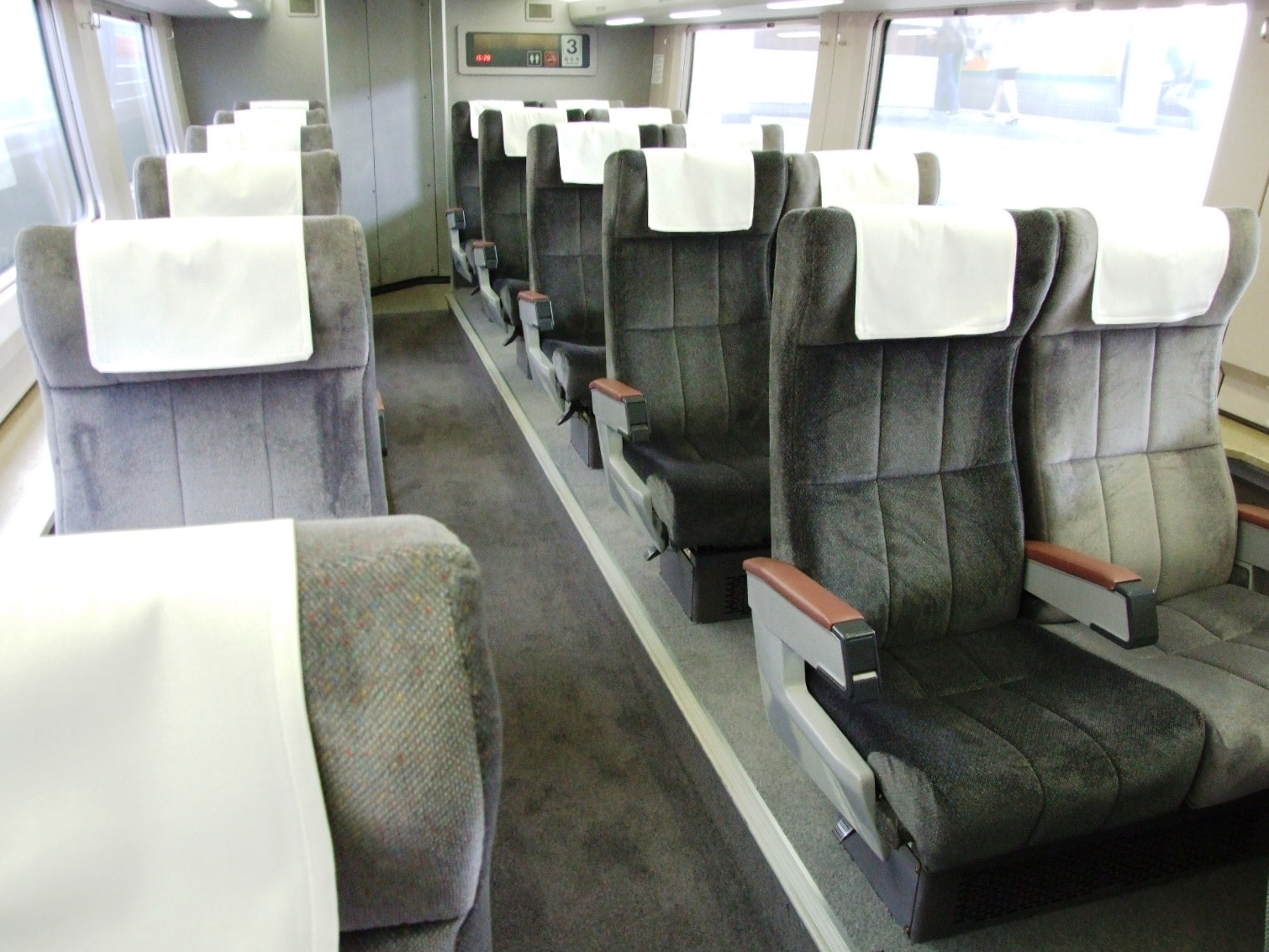
Bilevel car lower deck (standard class) accommodation, February 2009

== History ==
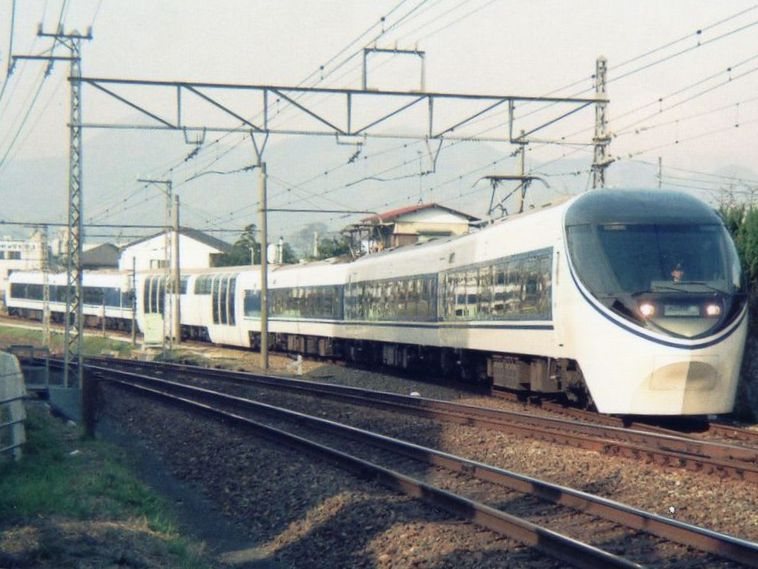
The 371 series around 1991, with its original lozenge-type pantographs

The 371 series set entered service on 16 March 1991. From 24 June 1997, car 7 was made no-smoking, and from 18 March 2007, all cars were made no-smoking. From 6 November 2006, the original PS24A lozenge-type pantographs were replaced with C-PS27A single-arm pantographs.

=== Withdrawal ===
The 371 series was withdrawn from Asagiri services following its last run on 16 March 2012. It was subsequently re-employed as a special charter train for use from autumn 2012.

The train was finally withdrawn from service after a final run on 30 November 2014.

=== Resale ===
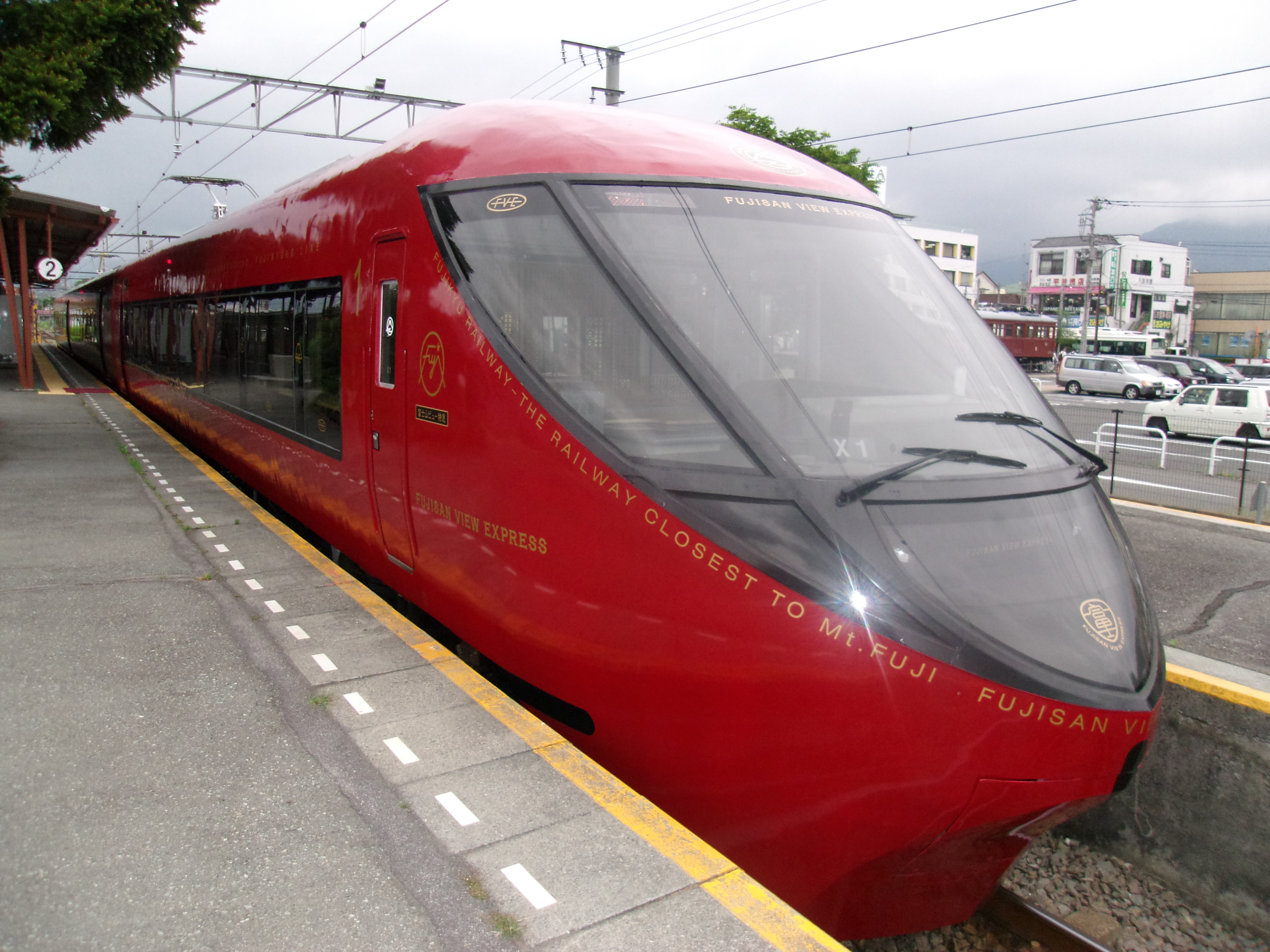
The Fujikyu 8500 series set in June 2016

In December 2014, it was announced that the private railway operator Fuji Kyuko planned to purchase the trainset, and reform it as a three-car set for use on Fujisan Tokkyu services later in fiscal 2015. The train was moved from Shizuoka to JR East's Nagano Works for rebuilding work in March 2015.
