= Odakyu 60000 series MSE =

Japanese electric multiple unit trainset

Odakyu 60000 series Multi Super Express
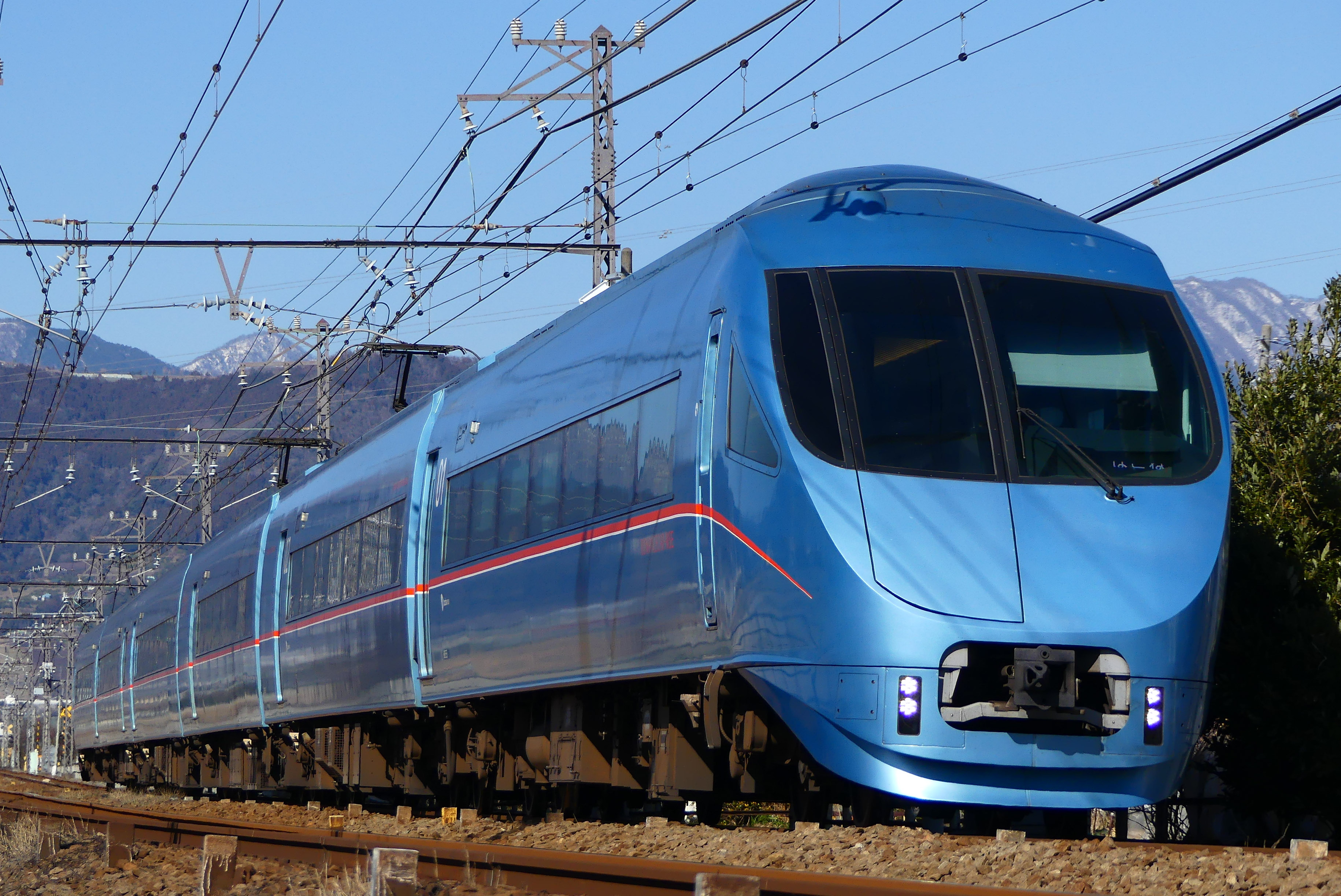
- An Odakyu 60000 series MSE in January 2018
- In service: March 2008 – present
- Manufacturer: Nippon Sharyo
- Built at: Toyokawa, Aichi
- Family name: Romancecar
- Replaced: Odakyu 20000 series RSE; JR Central 371 series
- Constructed: 2007–2015
- Number built: 42 vehicles (8 trainsets)
- Number in service: 42 vehicles (8 trainsets) (as of 1 April 2022)
- Formation: 6/4 cars per set
- Fleet numbers: 60251–60255 (6-car sets); 60051–60053 (4-car sets)
- Operators: Odakyu Electric Railway
- Depots: Kitami
- Lines served: Odawara Line; Enoshima Line; Hakone Tozan Line; JR Central Gotemba Line; Tokyo Metro Chiyoda Line; Tokyo Metro Yūrakuchō Line (formerly)

Specifications
- Car body construction: Aluminium
- Car length: 20,000 mm (65 ft 7 in) (intermediate cars); 20,220 mm (66 ft 4 in) (end cars 1 & 10)
- Width: 2,850 mm (9 ft 4 in)
- Height: 4,140 mm (13 ft 7 in)
- Maximum speed: 110 km/h (68 mph) (service); 120 km/h (75 mph) (design)
- Traction system: Variable frequency (2-level IGBT)
- Acceleration: 2.0 km/(h⋅s) (1.2 mph/s) (Odakyu lines); 2.4 km/(h⋅s) (1.5 mph/s) (Tokyo Metro and Hakone Tozan lines)
- Deceleration: 4.0 km/(h⋅s) (2.5 mph/s) (service); 4.7 km/(h⋅s) (2.9 mph/s) (emergency)
- Electric system(s): 1,500 V DC
- Current collection: Overhead lines
- Safety system(s): OM-ATS/D-ATS-P, ATC, ATS-PT
- Track gauge: 1,067 mm (3 ft 6 in)

Notes/references
- This train won the 52nd Blue Ribbon Award in 2009.

The Odakyu 60000 series MSE (小田急60000形, Odakyū 60000-gata) (Multi Super Express) is a Romancecar electric multiple unit (EMU) train type operated by the private railway operator Odakyu Electric Railway in Japan since March 2008. The trains are used on Odakyu through service to the Tokyo Metro Chiyoda Line, and some trains also travel over the Tokyo Metro Yurakucho Line, making it the first limited express train with reserved seats to operate through a subway line in Tokyo.

== Operations ==
=== Weekdays ===
- Mt. Fuji
- Metro Sagami
- Metro Homeway

=== Weekends/holidays ===
- Metro Sagami
- Bay Resort (discontinued)
- Metro Hakone
- Metro Homeway

== Formations ==
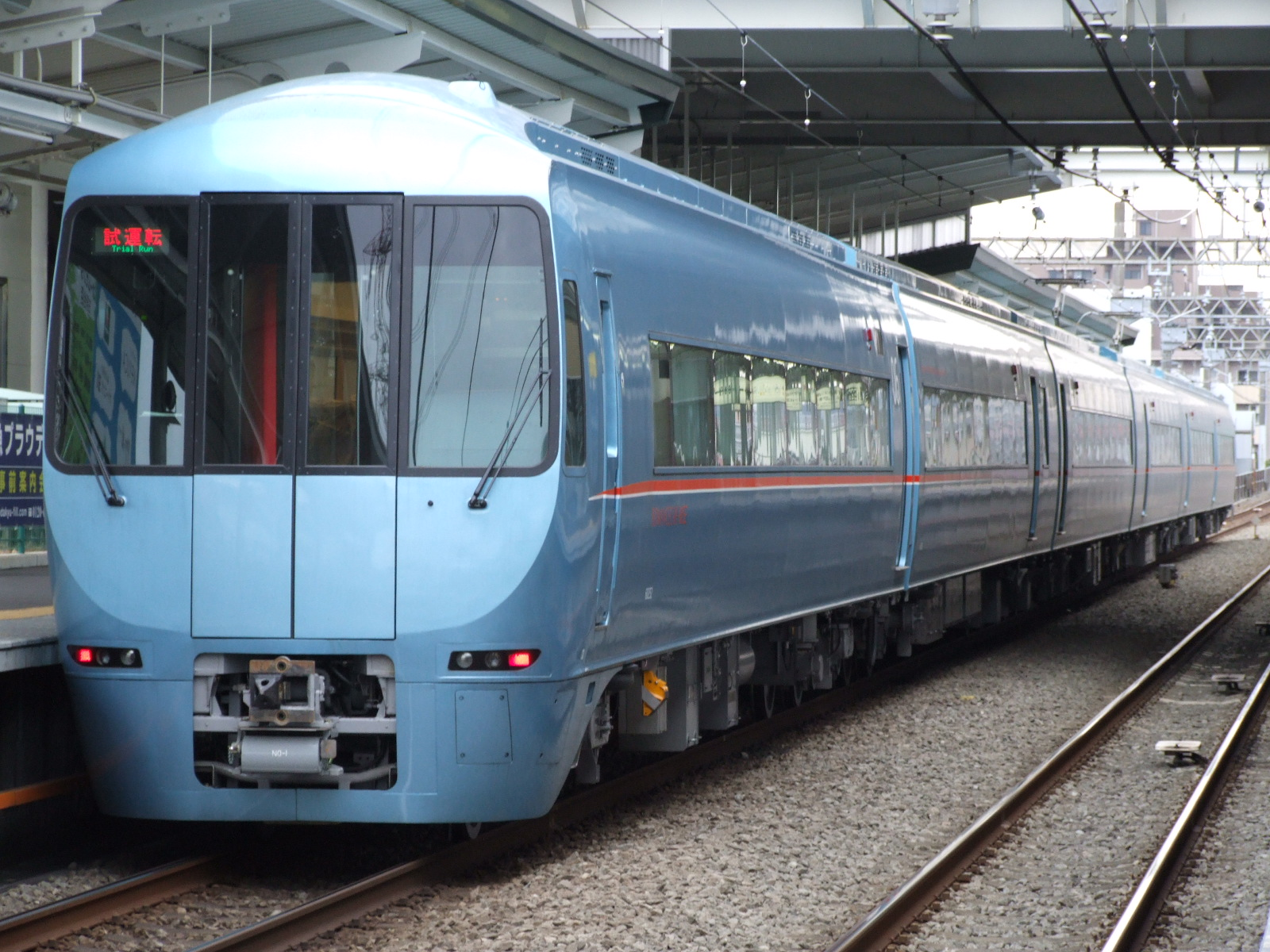
Gangwayed cab end

As of 1 April 2022, the fleet consists of five 6-car sets and three 4-car sets (42 vehicles in total), formed as follows, with car 1 at the Odawara end and car 10 at the Shinjuku (Tokyo) end.

| Car No. | 1 | 2 | 3 | 4 | 5 | 6 | 7 | 8 | 9 | 10 |
|---|---|---|---|---|---|---|---|---|---|---|
| Designation | Tc2 | M4 | M3 | M2' | M1' | Tc1' | Tc2' | M2 | M1 | Tc1 |
| Numbering | KuHa 60550 | DeHa 60500 | DeHa 60400 | DeHa 60300 | DeHa 60200 | KuHa 60250 | KuHa 60150 | DeHa 60100 | DeHa 60000 | KuHa 60050 |
| Weight (t) | 32.1 | 39.6 | 38.9 | 38.3 | 36.4 | 32.3 | 33.1 | 38.8 | 38.5 | 31.8 |
| Seating capacity | 56 | 60 | 56 | 68 | 52 | 60 | 60 | 54 | 56 | 56 |

Cars 2, 3, 8, and 9 each have one single-arm pantograph.

== Interior ==
Accommodation is monoclass, with seating arranged 2+2 at a seat pitch of 983 mm (38.7 in). All passenger saloons are designated no-smoking. cars 2, 5, and 8 are equipped with toilets. Refreshment counters are provided in cars 3 and 9.

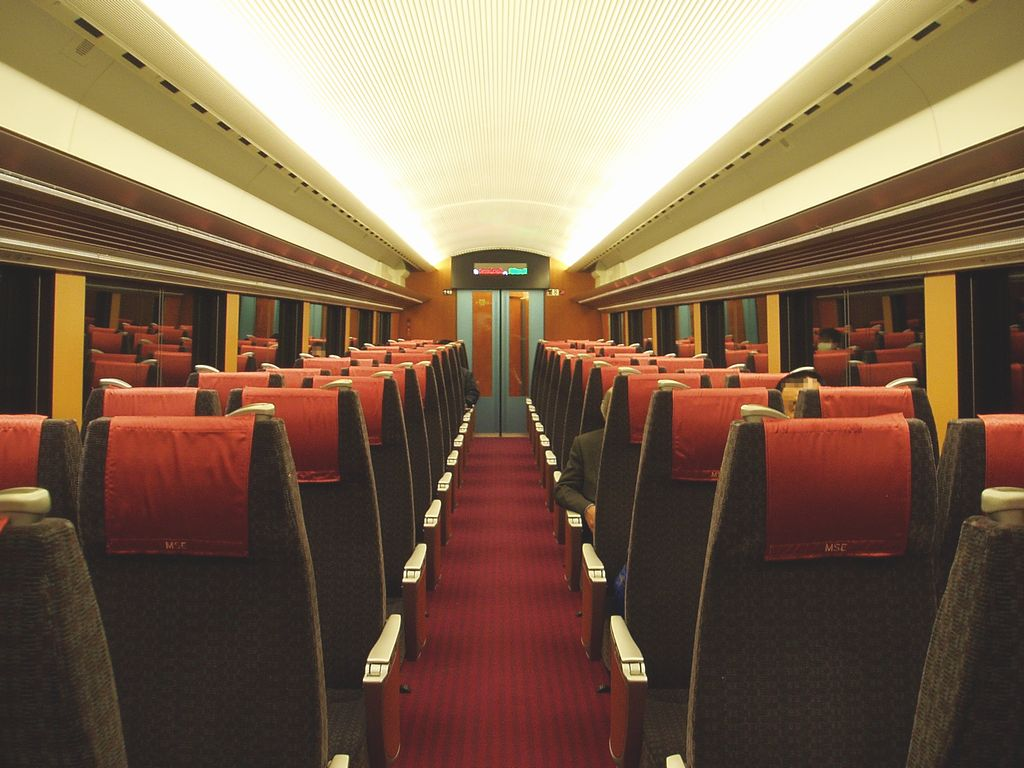
Interior view

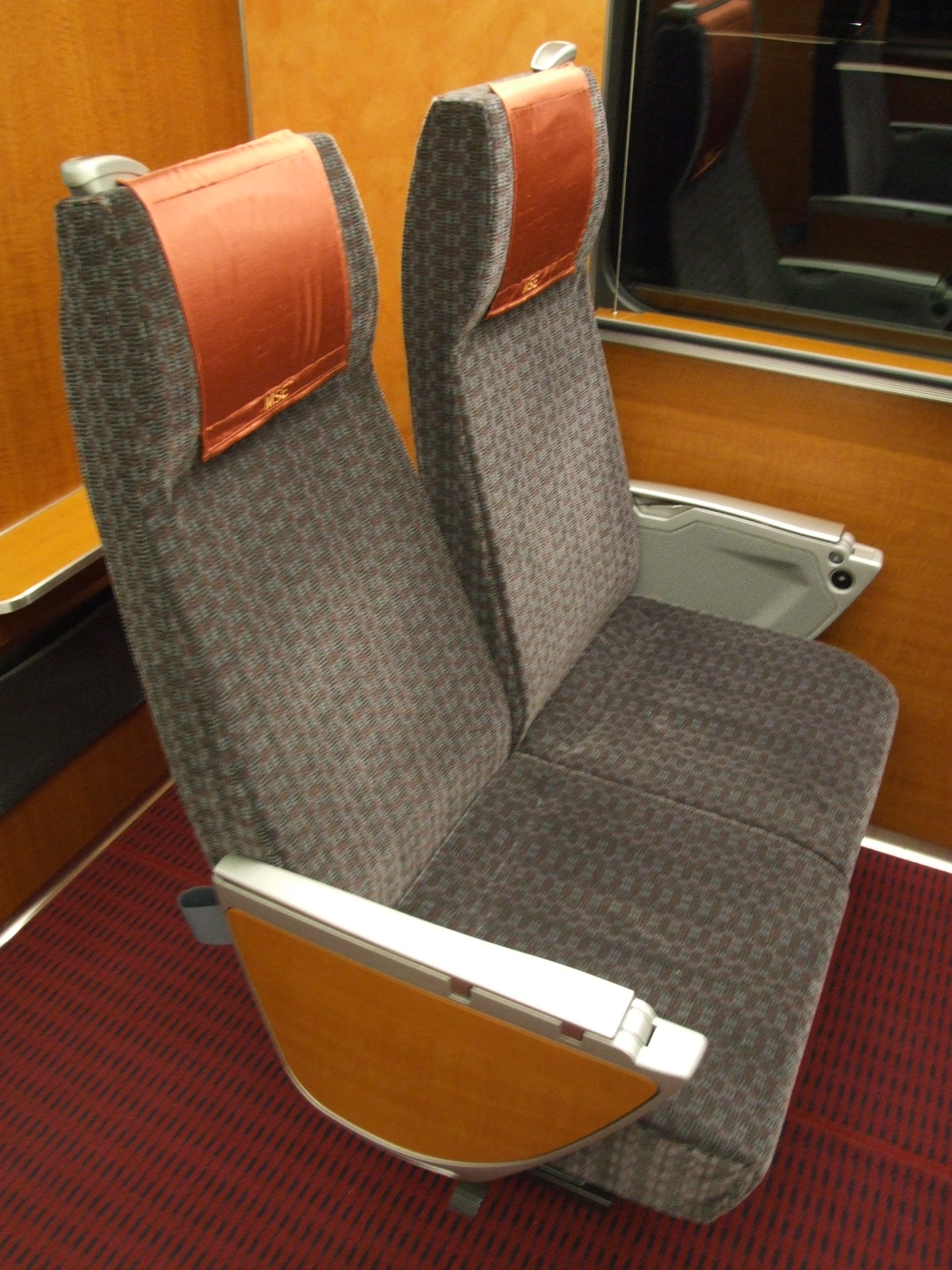
Seating detail

== History ==
Two six-car sets and one four-car set were ordered in September 2006, with the first six-car set delivered from Nippon Sharyo in October 2007. The trains entered service on 15 March 2008.

In 2009, the 60000 series MSE was awarded the Blue Ribbon Award, presented annually in Japan by the Japan Railfan Club for railway vehicles voted as being the most outstanding design of the year.

A third six-car set was delivered in October 2009.

From the start of the revised timetable on 17 March 2012, 60000 series six-car sets were introduced on Asagiri services between Shinjuku and Gotemba, replacing the Odakyu 20000 series RSE and JR Central 371 series EMUs previously used.

A fifth six-car set (60255) was delivered from Nippon Sharyo in late October 2015, followed by a third four-car set (60053) in November 2015.
