= Mt. Fuji (train) =

Japanese limited express train service

- Odakyu 60000 series EMU on a Mt. Fuji service, April 2022

Overview
- Service type: Limited express
- Status: In operation
- Locale: Tokyo, Kanagawa and Shizuoka, Japan
- Predecessor: Asagiri
- First service: 1 May 1959 (Semi-express); 1 July 1968 (Express); 16 March 1991 (Limited express)
- Current operator: Odakyu Electric Railway
- Former operators: JNR, JR Central

Route
- Termini: Shinjuku; Gotemba
- Stops: 8
- Service frequency: 3/4 return workings daily
- Lines used: Odakyu Odawara Line, JR Central Gotemba Line

On-board services
- Class: Standard class only
- Disabled access: Yes
- Seating arrangements: 2+2 forward facing
- Sleeping arrangements: None
- Catering facilities: Vending machines only
- Entertainment facilities: None
- Other facilities: Toilets

Technical
- Rolling stock: Odakyu 60000 series MSE EMUs
- Track gauge: 1,067 mm (3 ft 6 in)
- Electrification: 1,500 V DC overhead
- Operating speed: 110 km/h (70 mph)
- Track owners: Odakyu Electric Railway, JR Central

The Mt. Fuji (ふじさん, Fujisan) (formerly known as the Asagiri (あさぎり) prior to 17 March 2018) is a "Romancecar" limited express train operated by Odakyu Electric Railway between Shinjuku and Gotemba via the Odakyu Odawara Line and JR Central's Gotemba Line.

== Route ==
Mt. Fuji services stop at the following stations:

Shinjuku – Shin-Yurigaoka – Sagami-Ono – Hon-Atsugi – Hadano – Matsuda – (Suruga-Oyama) – Gotemba

- The outbound Mt. Fuji No. 1 and No. 3 travel to Gotemba, and the inbound Mt. Fuji No. 6 travels to Shinjuku at the evening stop at Suruga-Oyama. When boarding a Mt. Fuji train at Suruga-Oyama, a limited express ticket must be purchased from onboard train crew.

== Rolling stock ==
- Odakyu 60000 series MSE 6-car EMUs (since 17 March 2012)

=== Past ===
- Odakyu KiHa 5000 series and KiHa 5100 series DMUs (July 1959 – June 1968)
- Odakyu 3000 series SSE EMUs (July 1968 – March 1991)
- JR Central 371 series 7-car EMU (March 1991 – 16 March 2012)
- Odakyu 20000 series RSE 7-car EMUs (March 1991 – 16 March 2012)
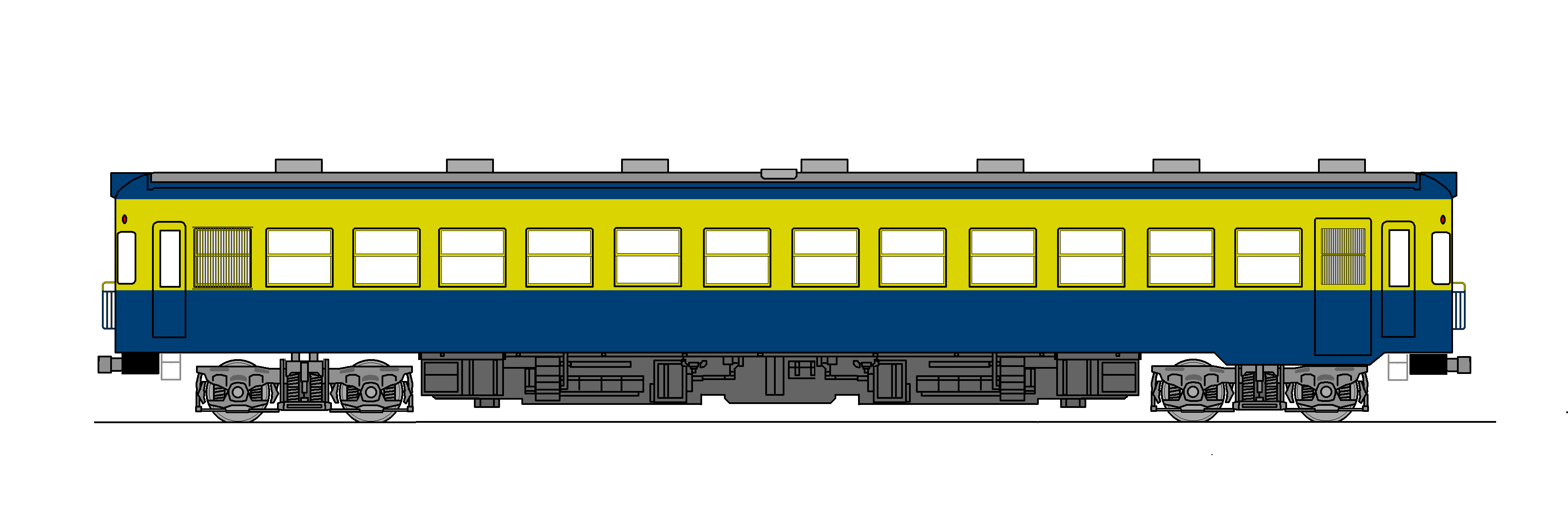
KiHa 5000 series DMU car

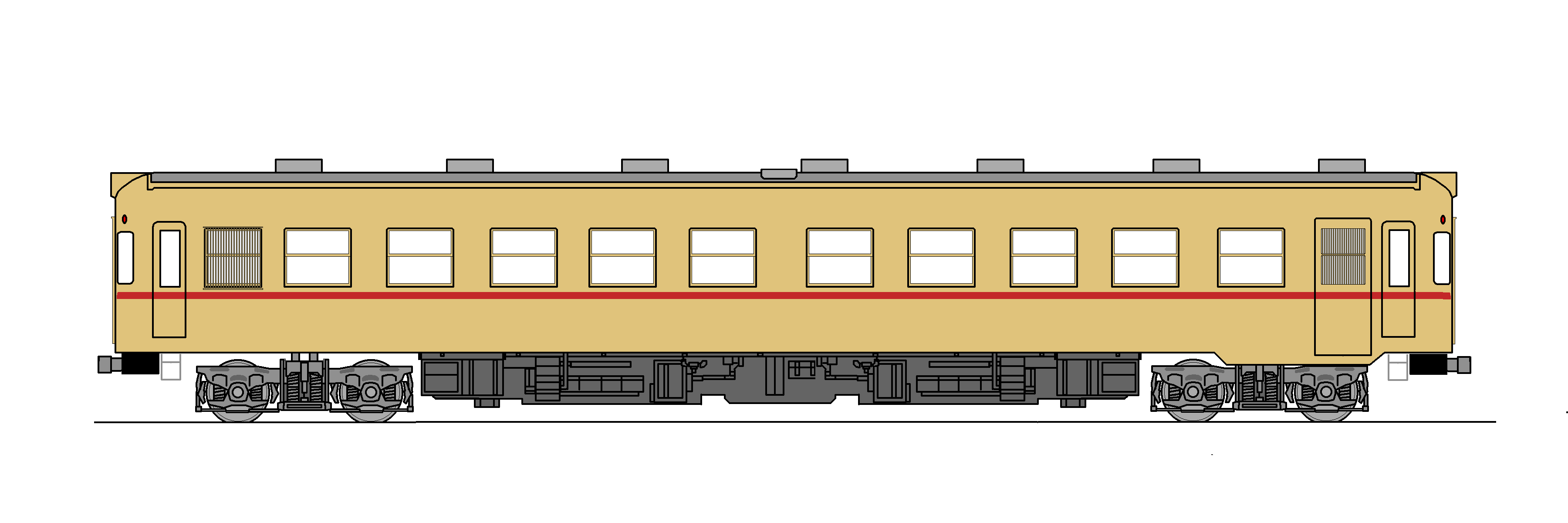
KiHa 5100 series DMU car

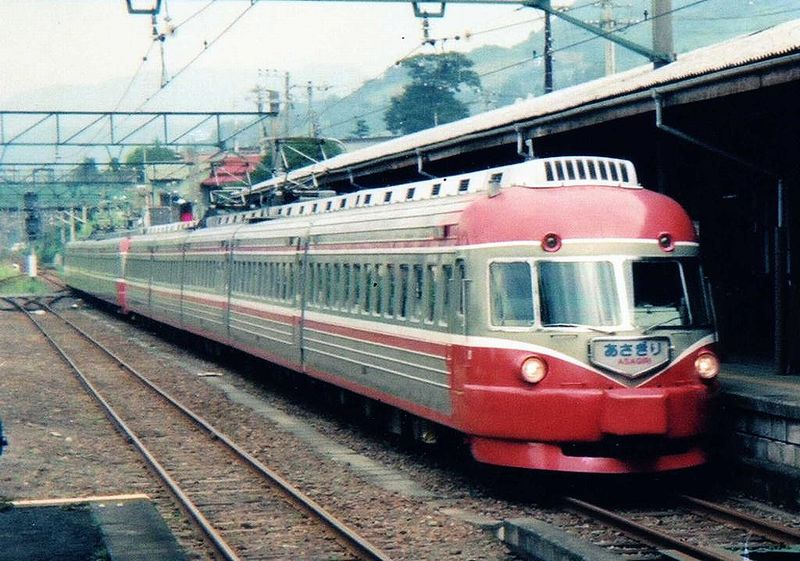
Odakyu 3000 series SSE, 1991

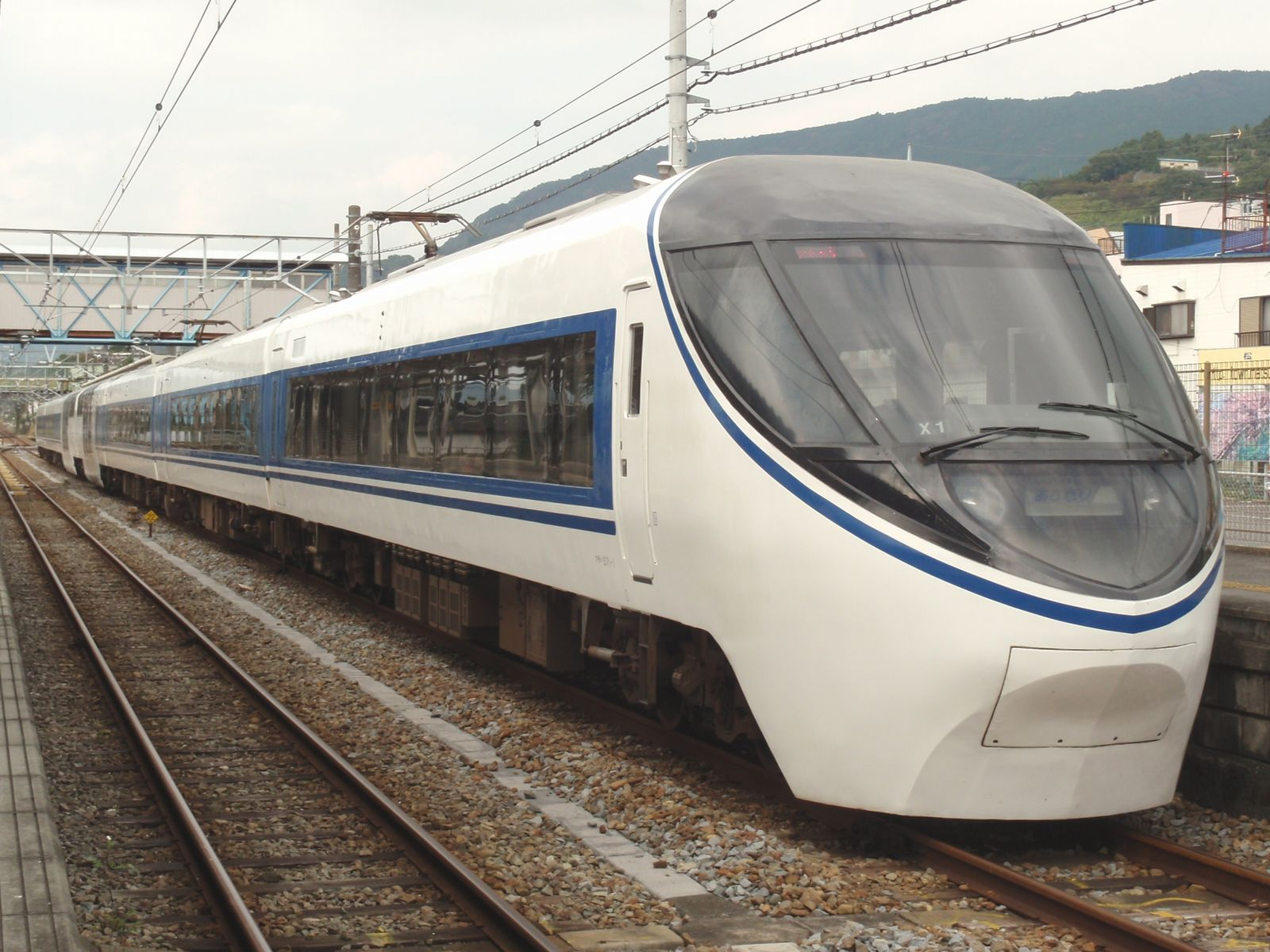
JR Central 371 series, October 2009

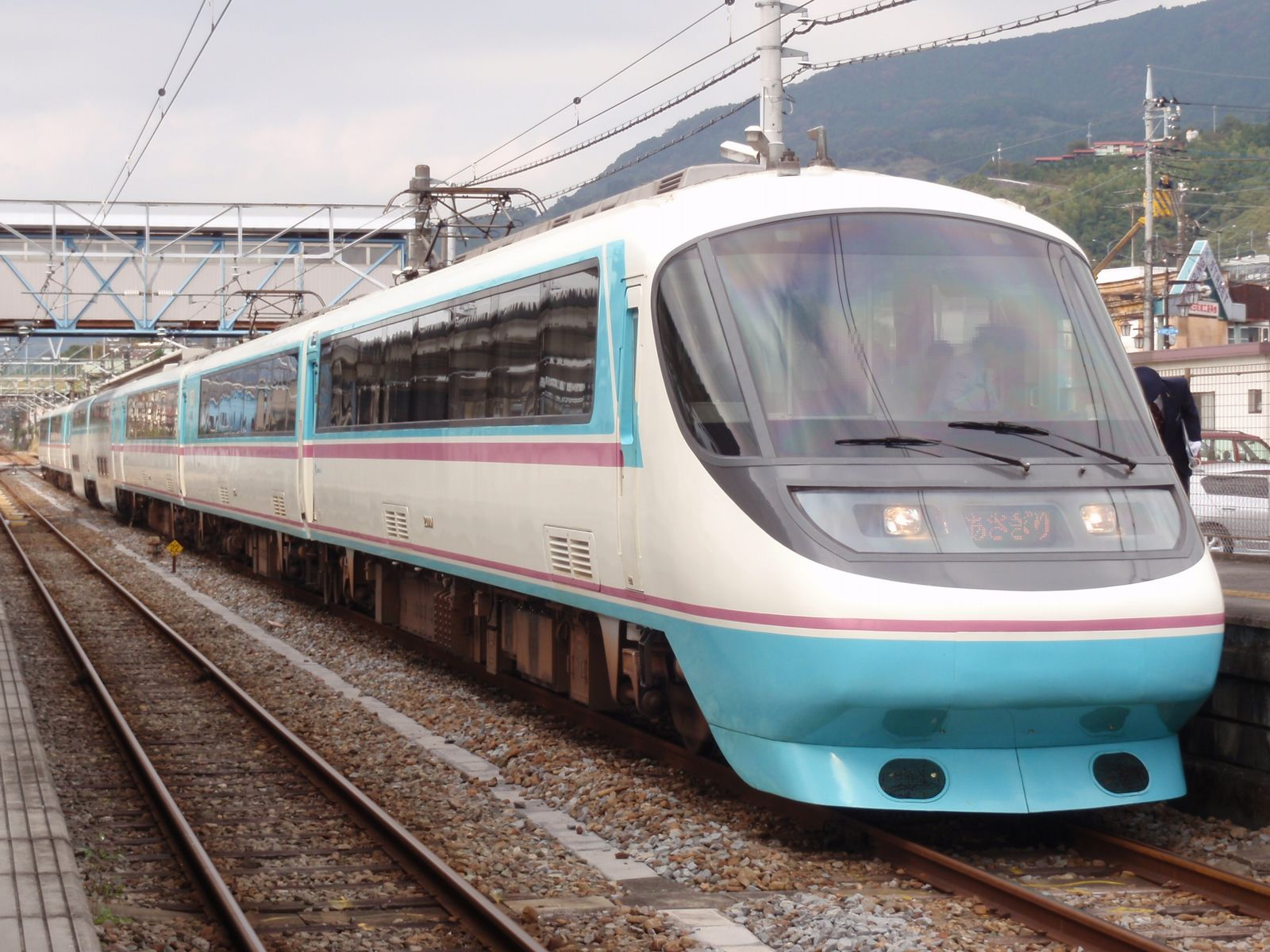
Odakyu 20000 series RSE, October 2009

== History ==
=== Kyushu Asagiri ===
The Asagiri (あさぎり) name was first used from 1 May 1959 for a JNR semi-express operating between Moji and Amagase in Kyushu. This service was upgraded to "Express" status from 5 March 1966. It was discontinued from 1 October 1980.

=== Gotemba Line Asagiri ===
A second Asagiri service, initially written in kanji as "朝霧" commenced on 2 July 1959 as a semi-express operating between Shinjuku and Gotemba. The Asagiri, together with the Nagao (長尾), supplemented the Ginrei (銀嶺) and Fuyō (芙蓉) Shinjuku—Gotemba semi-express services, which commenced on 1 October 1955. Asagiri services were upgraded to "express" status from 1 July 1968 following electrification and the introduction of Odakyu 3000 series SE EMUs. The four names were also merged into "あさぎり" in hiragana. It became a "Limited express" from 16 March 1991 with the introduction of new JR Central 371 series and Odakyu 20000 series RSE 7-car EMUs, operating between Shinjuku and Numazu.

=== March 2012 timetable revision ===
From the start of the revised timetable on 17 March 2012, the Odakyu 20000 series sets and JR Central's lone 371 series set were withdrawn, and all services were operated instead using Odakyu 60000 series MSE 6-car sets. From the same date, service frequency was reduced from the current four return services daily to three on weekdays and four at weekends, and all services were truncated to operate between Shinjuku and Gotemba stations.

=== March 2018 timetable revision ===
From the start of the revised timetable on 17 March 2018, Asagiri services are renamed Mt. Fuji (ふじさん).
