= Odakyu 20000 series RSE =

Japanese electric multiple unit trainset

Odakyu 20000 series Resort Super Express
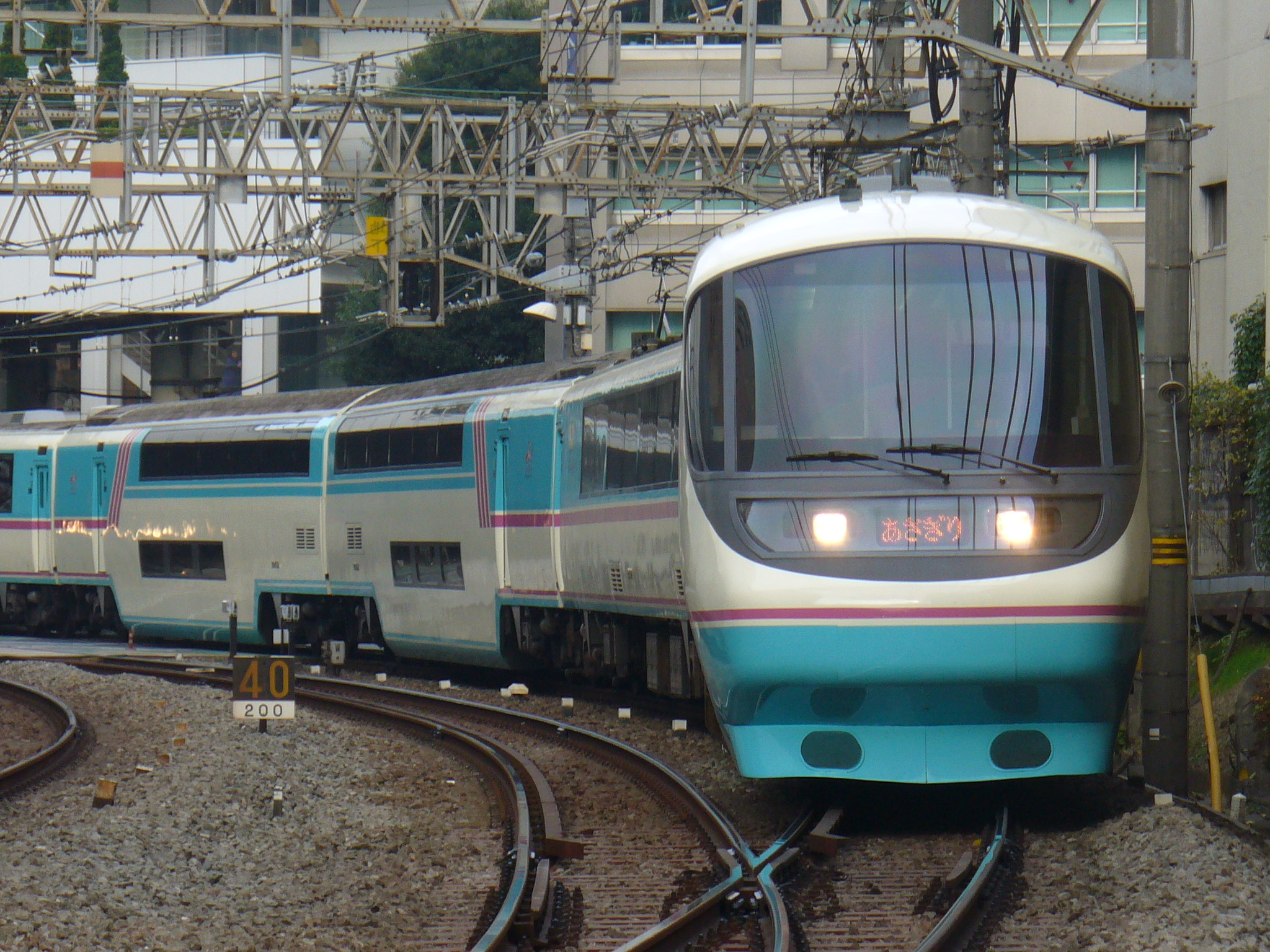
- Odakyu 20000 series RSE
- In service: March 1991 – March 2012
- Manufacturers: Nippon Sharyo (set 20001); Kawasaki Heavy Industries (set 20002)
- Family name: Romancecar
- Constructed: 1990–1991
- Number built: 14 vehicles (2 sets)
- Number in service: None
- Number scrapped: 9 vehicles
- Formation: 7 cars per set
- Operator: Odakyu
- Depot: Kitami

Specifications
- Car length: 20 m (65 ft 7 in)
- Height: 4,050 mm (13 ft 3 in)
- Traction system: Resistor control
- Electric systems: 1,500 V DC overhead catenary
- Current collection: Pantograph
- Bogies: FS546 (motored); FS046 (trailer)
- Braking system: Dynamic brake
- Safety system: ATS (OM)
- Track gauge: 1,067 mm (3 ft 6 in)

Notes/references
- This train won the 35th Blue Ribbon Award in 1992.

The Odakyu 20000 series RSE (小田急20000形, Odakyū 20000-gata) (Resort Super Express) was an electric multiple unit (EMU) train type operated between 1991 and March 2012 by the private railway operator Odakyu Electric Railway on Asagiri limited express services in Japan.

== Operations ==
Up until 16 March 2012, the 20000 series RSE operated mainly between Odakyu's Shinjuku terminus in Tokyo and JR Central's Numazu Station on the Gotemba Line. On weekends, some trains operated between Shinjuku Station and Hakone-Yumoto Station.

== Formations ==
The two 7-car sets were formed as follows, with car 1 at the Odawara and Numazu end.

Car No.	1	2	3	4	5	6	7
Designation	M4c	M3	T3	T2	M2	T1	M1c
Numbering	20300	20200	20250	20150	20100	20050	20000
Accommodation	Standard (2+2)	Standard (2+2)	Super	Super	Standard (2+2)	Standard (2+2)	Standard (2+2)
Accommodation	Standard (2+2)	Standard (2+2)	Standard (2+1)	4-seat compartments	Standard (2+2)	Standard (2+2)	Standard (2+2)

Cars 1, 2, 6, and 7 each had one scissors type pantograph.

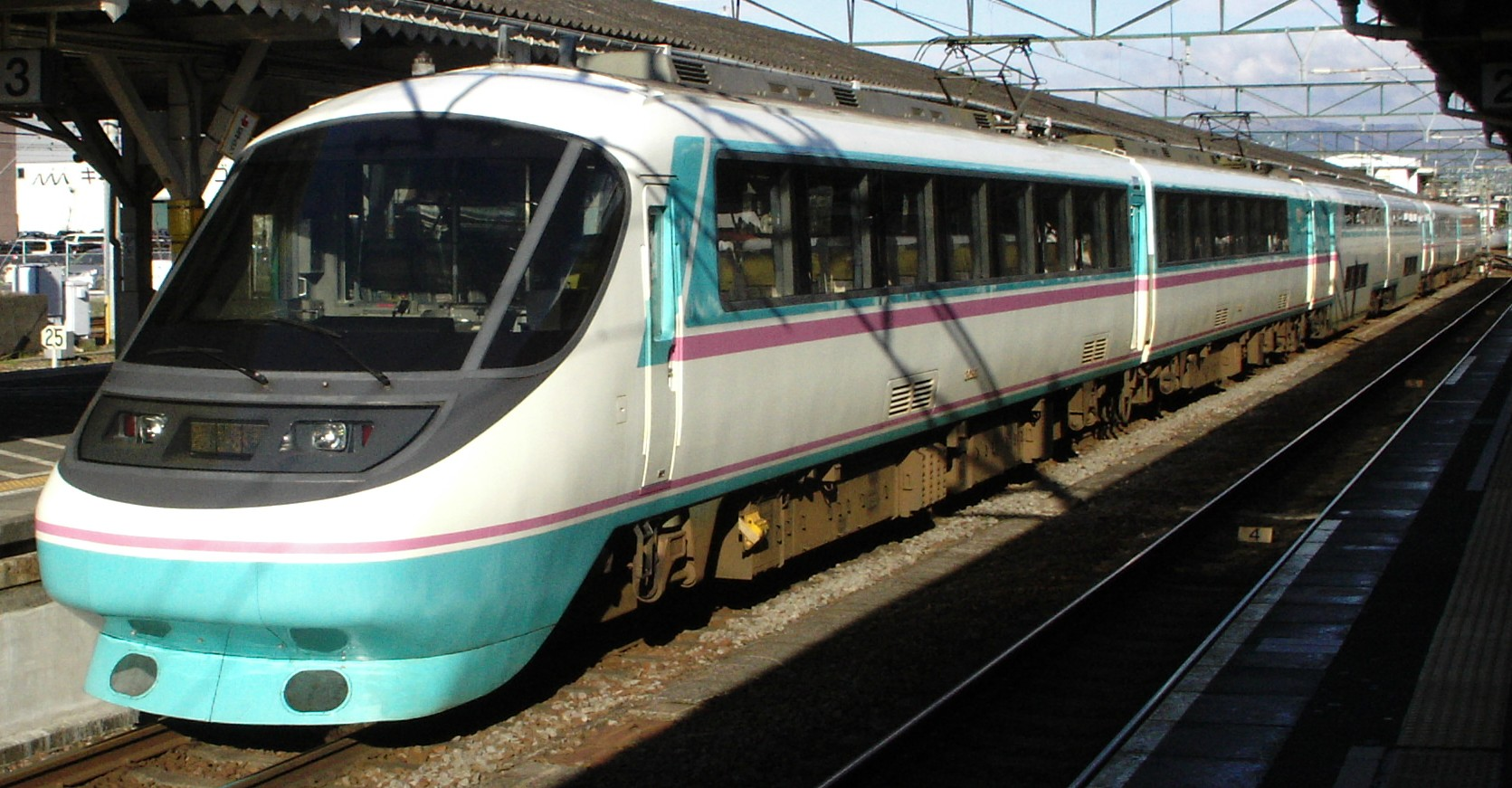
20301

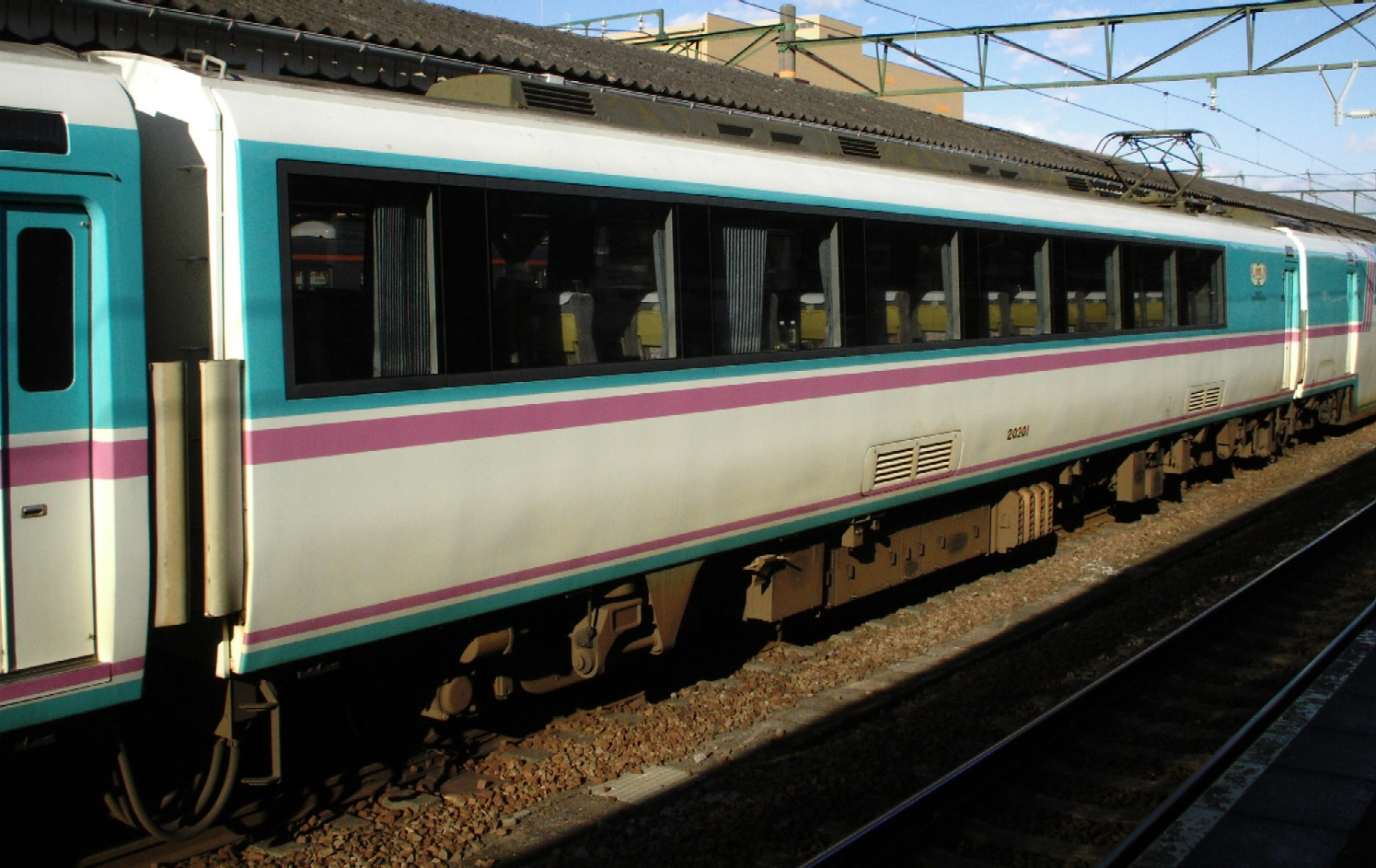
20201

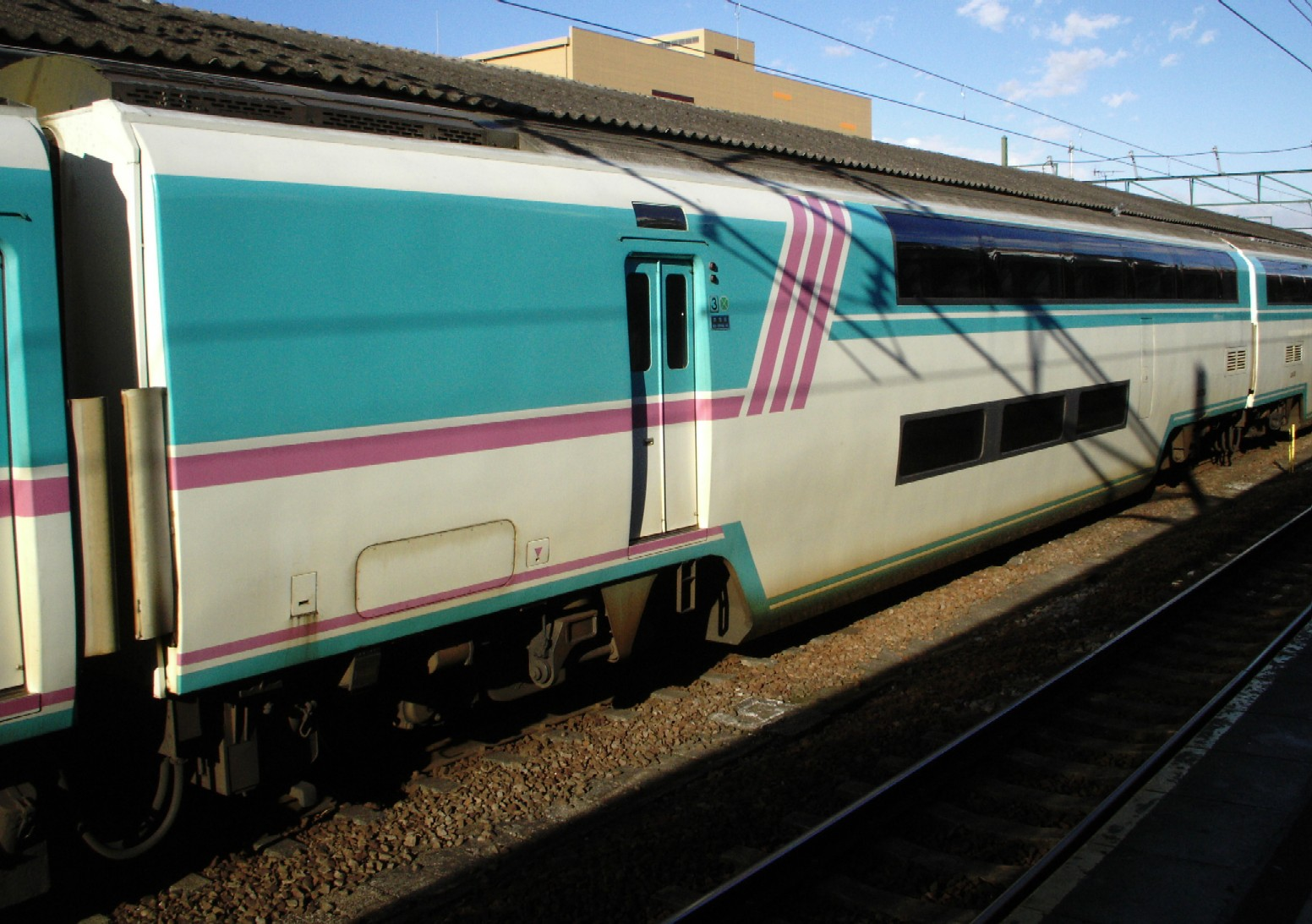
20251

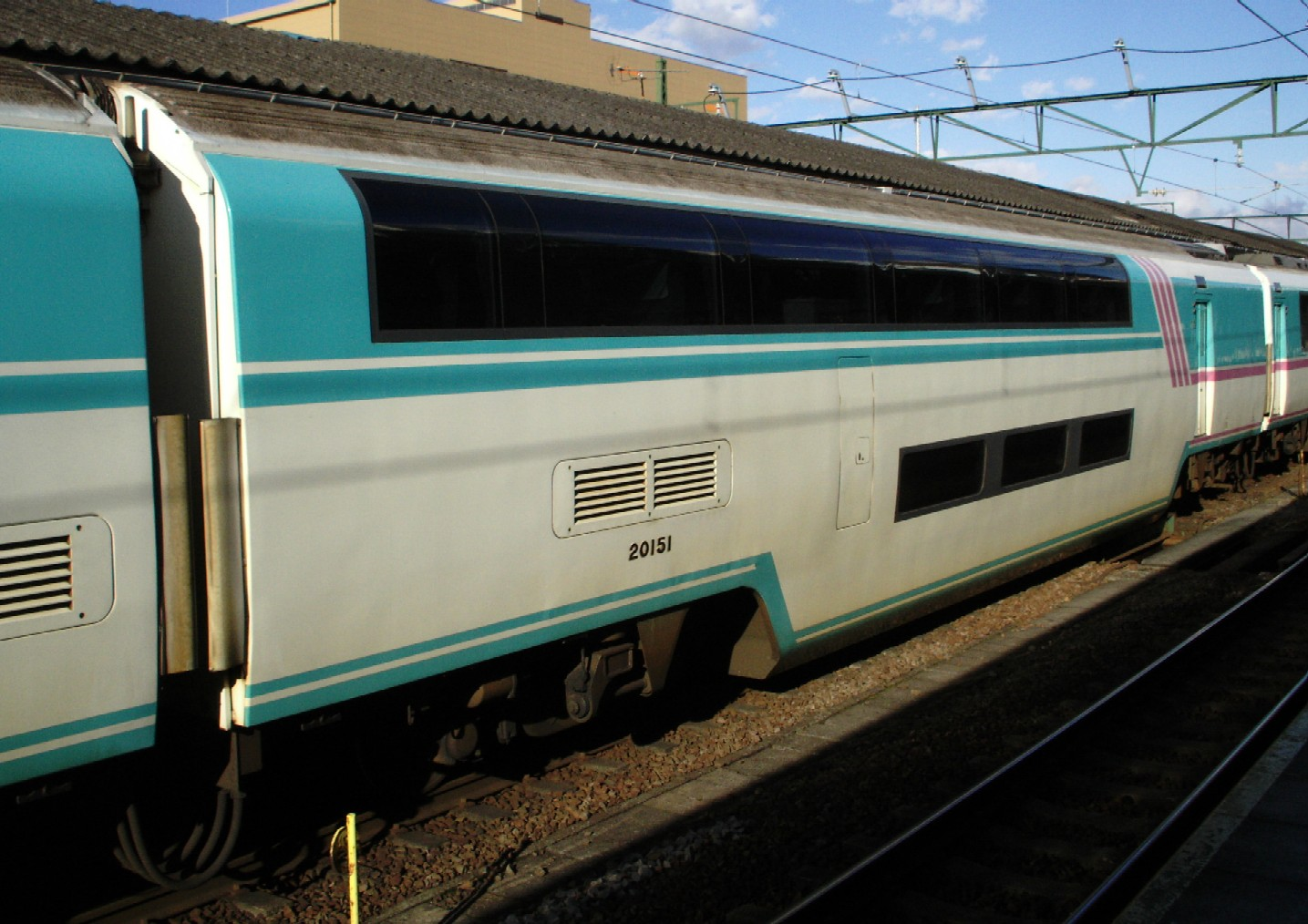
20151

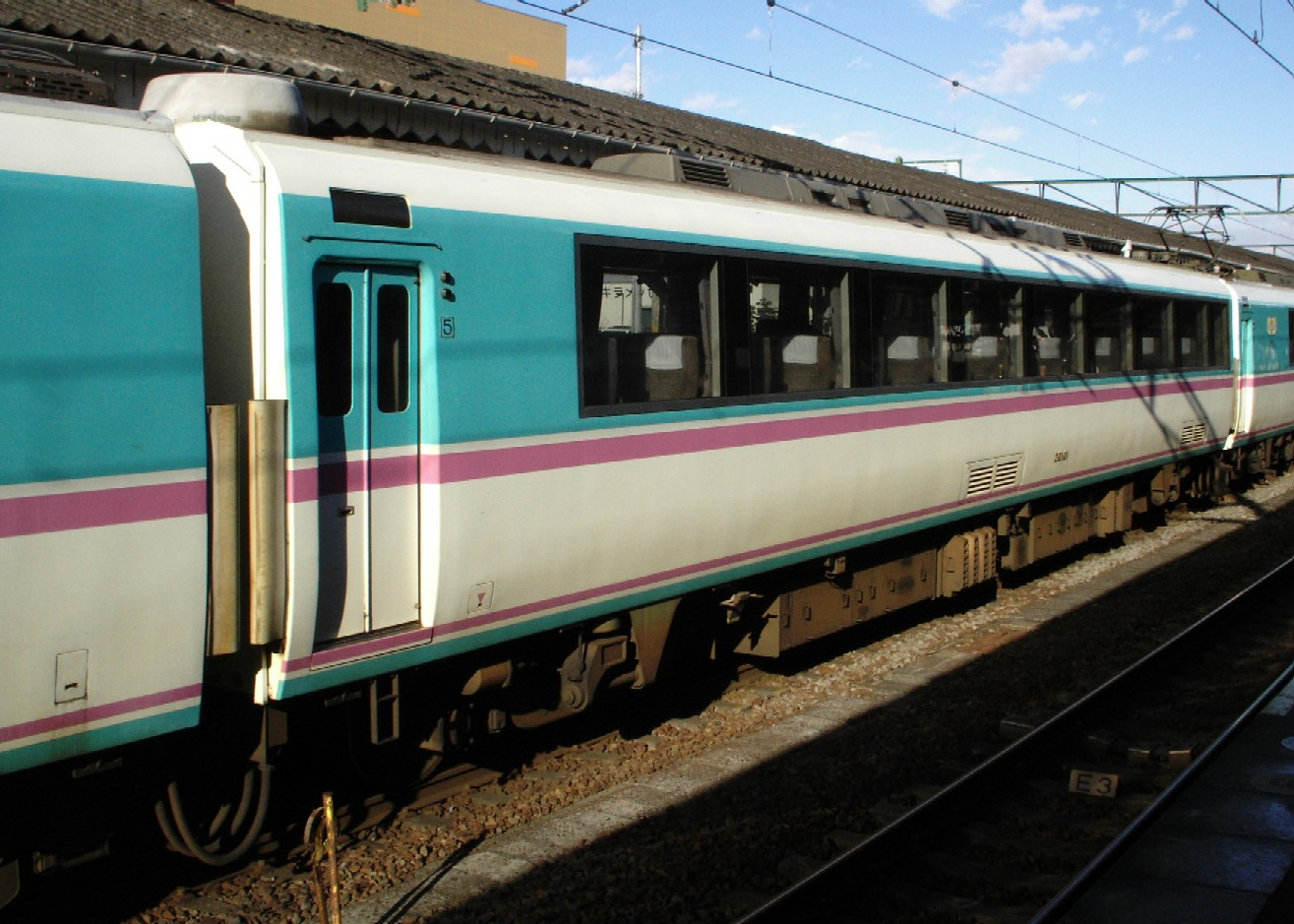
20101

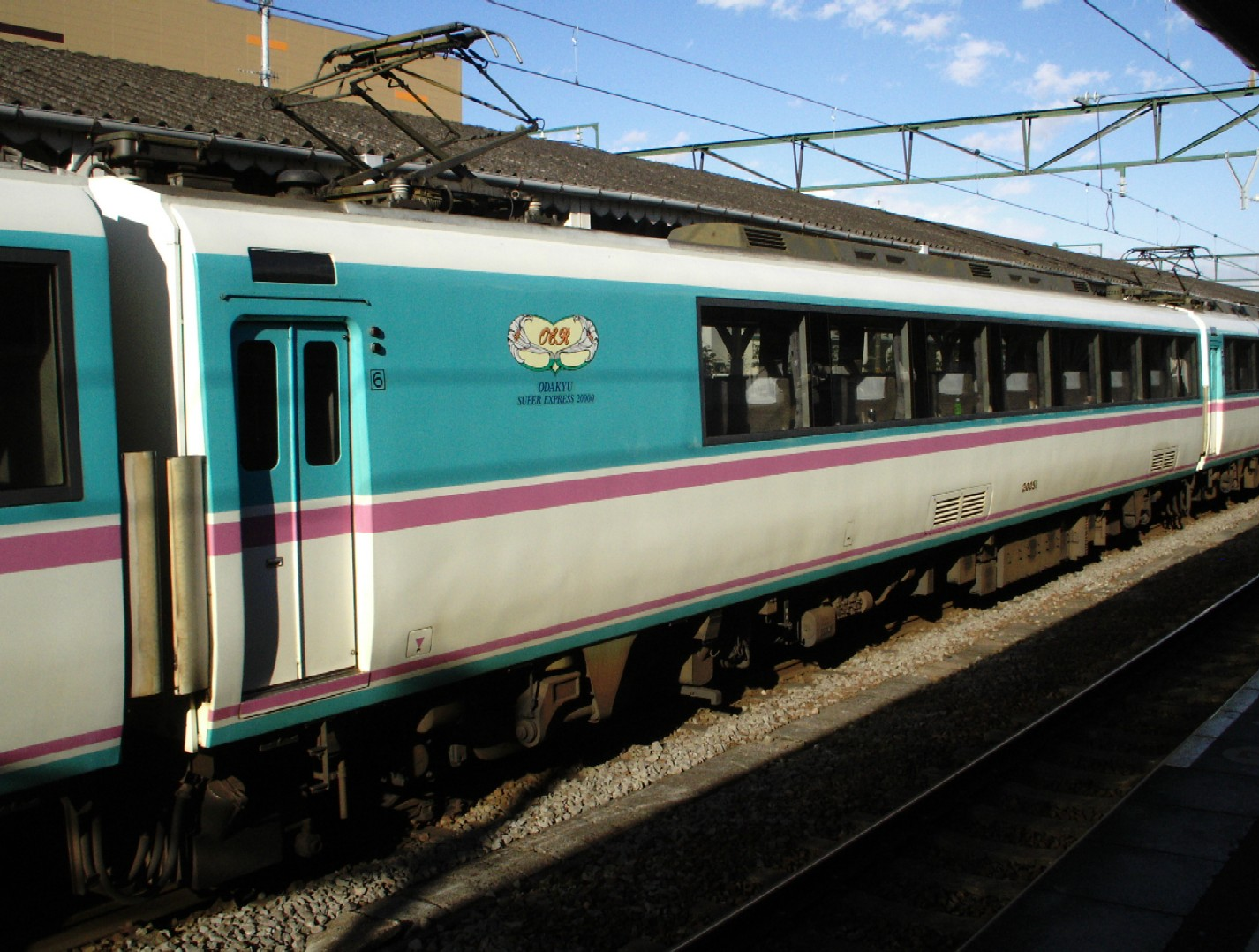
20051

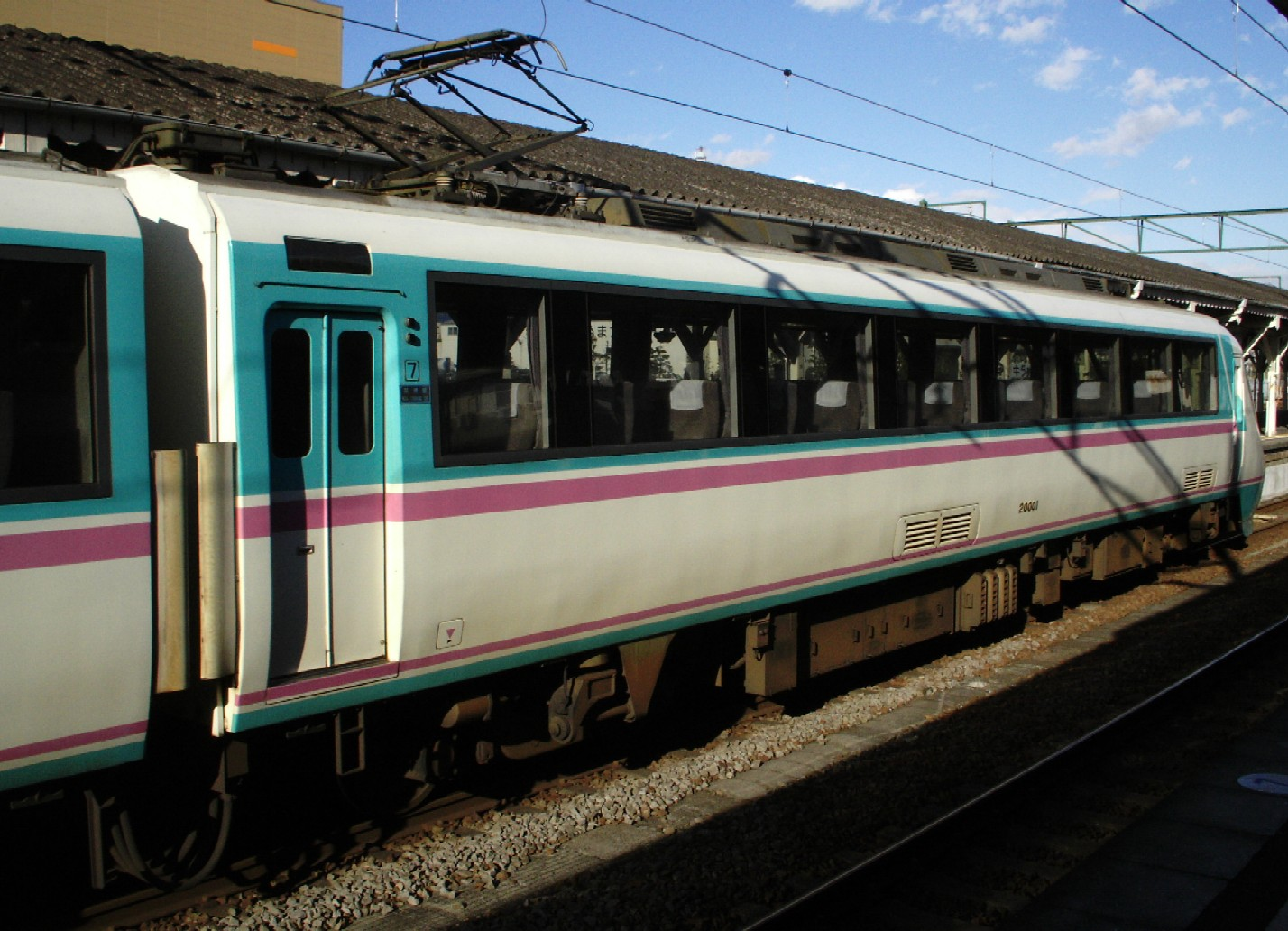
20001

== Interior ==
Standard-class seating was arranged 2+2 abreast with a seat pitch of 1,000 mm (39.4 in). The "Super seating" on the upper decks of cars 3 and 4 was arranged 2+1 abreast with a seat pitch of 1,100 mm (43.3 in). These were also marked as Green cars when operating on JR lines. All passenger saloons were designated no-smoking. cars 2 and 6 were equipped with toilets.

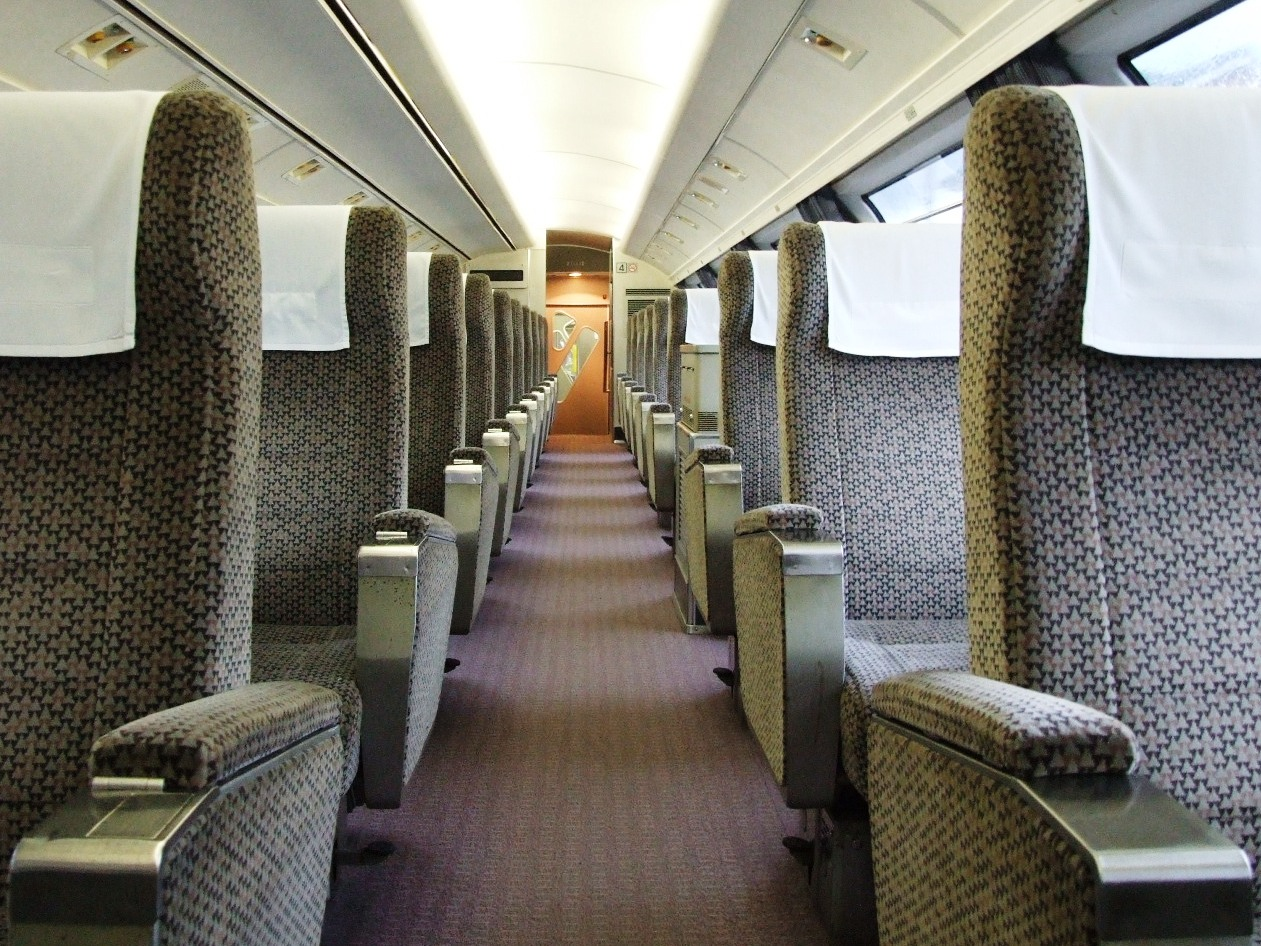
Upper deck "Super Seat" car saloon of bilevel car

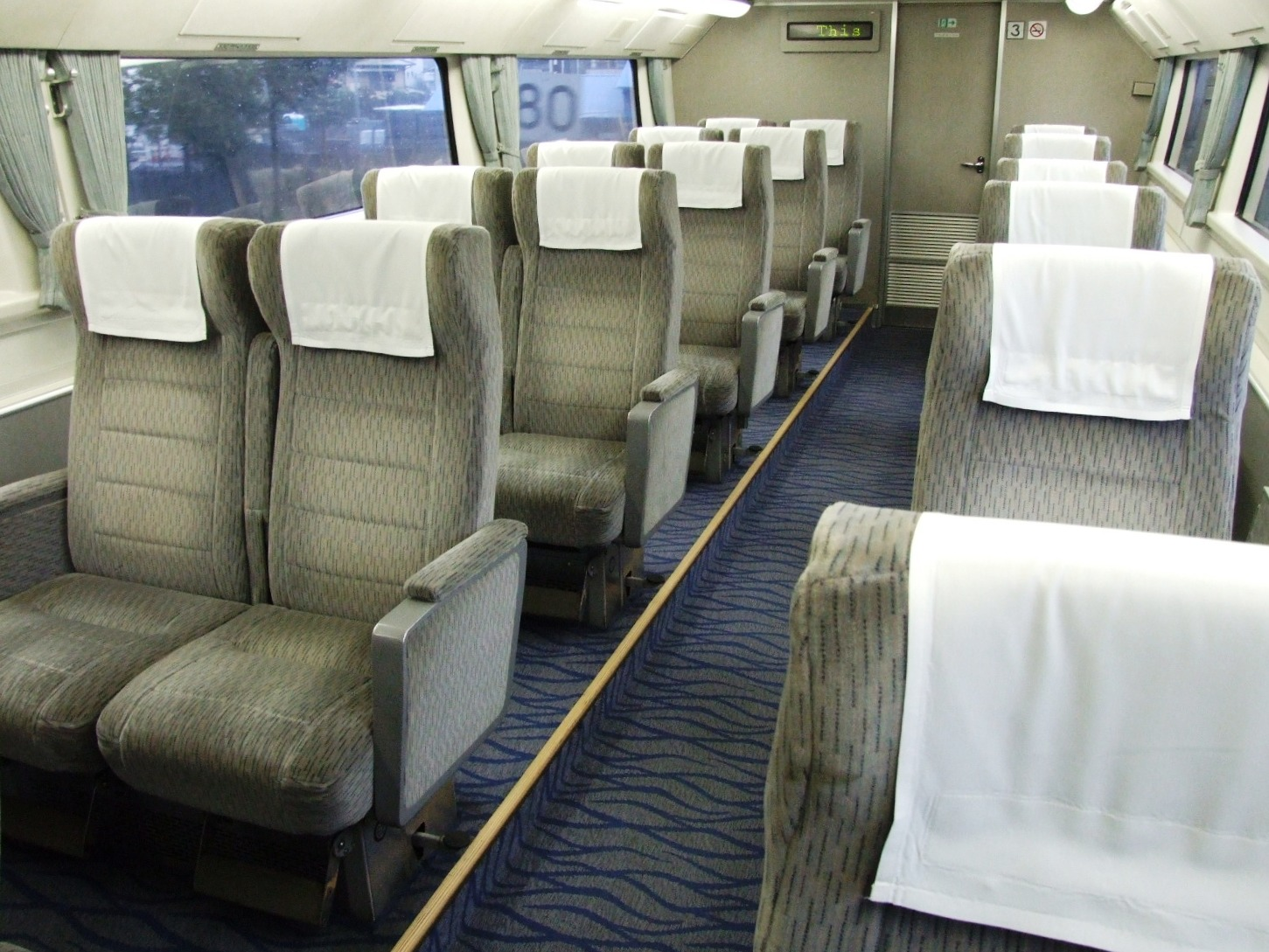
Lower deck of bilevel car 3 with 2+1 standard-class seating

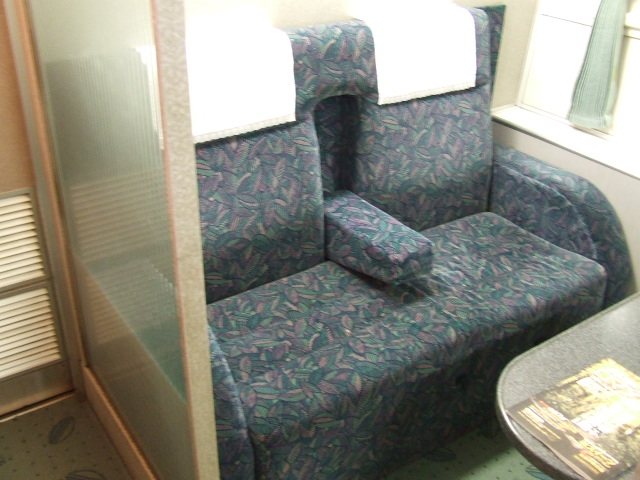
Semi-open compartment seating on lower deck of bilevel car 4

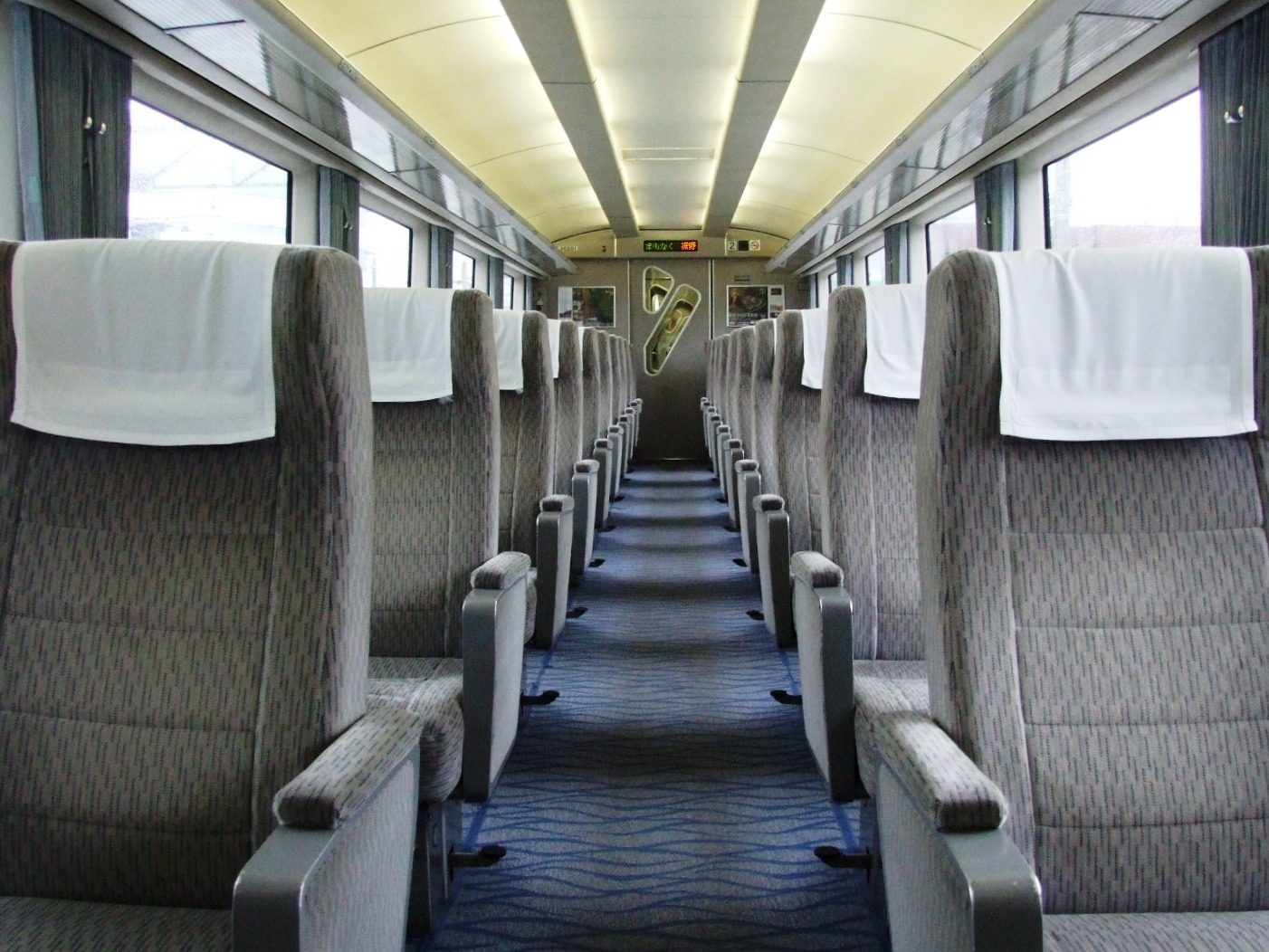
Standard-class saloon

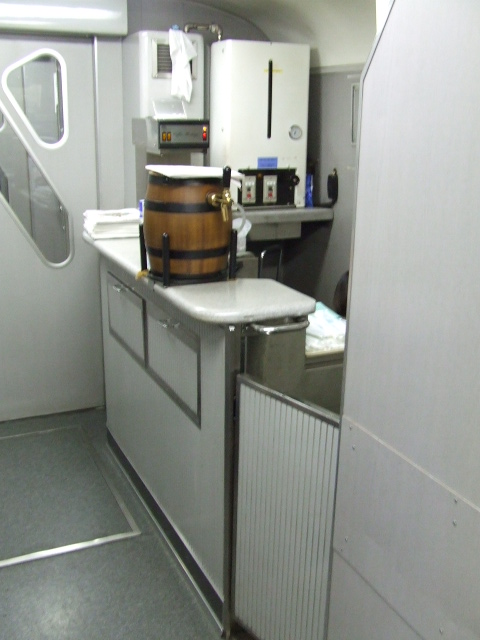
Refreshment counter

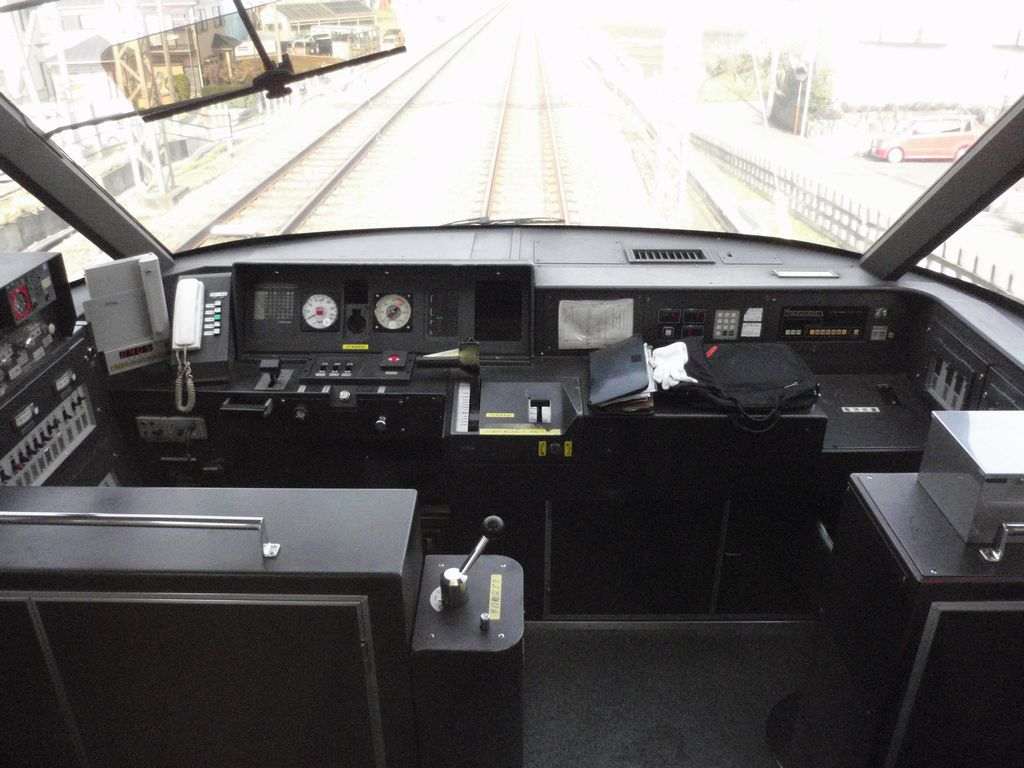
Driver's Cab

== History ==
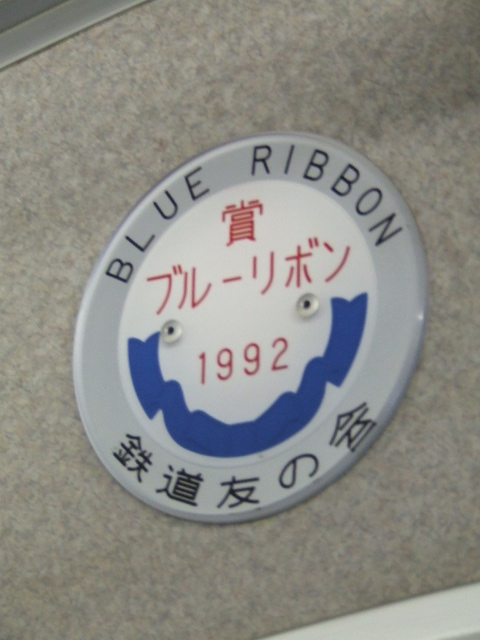
1992 Blue Ribbon Award plaque inside a 20000 series train

The first 20000 series RSE set was delivered in December 1990, followed by the second in January 1991. They entered service on Asagiri services from 16 March 1991.

In 1992, the 20000 series RSE was awarded the Blue Ribbon Award, presented annually in Japan by the Japan Railfan Club for railway vehicles voted as being the most outstanding design of the year.

=== Withdrawal ===
The 20000 series sets were withdrawn on 16 March 2012, and replaced by 60000 series MSE 6-car sets on Asagiri services from the start of the revised timetable on 17 March 2012. End car 20301 of set 20001 was moved to Kitami Depot for storage alongside set 20002 in September 2012, and the remaining cars of set 20001 were cut up.

=== Resale ===
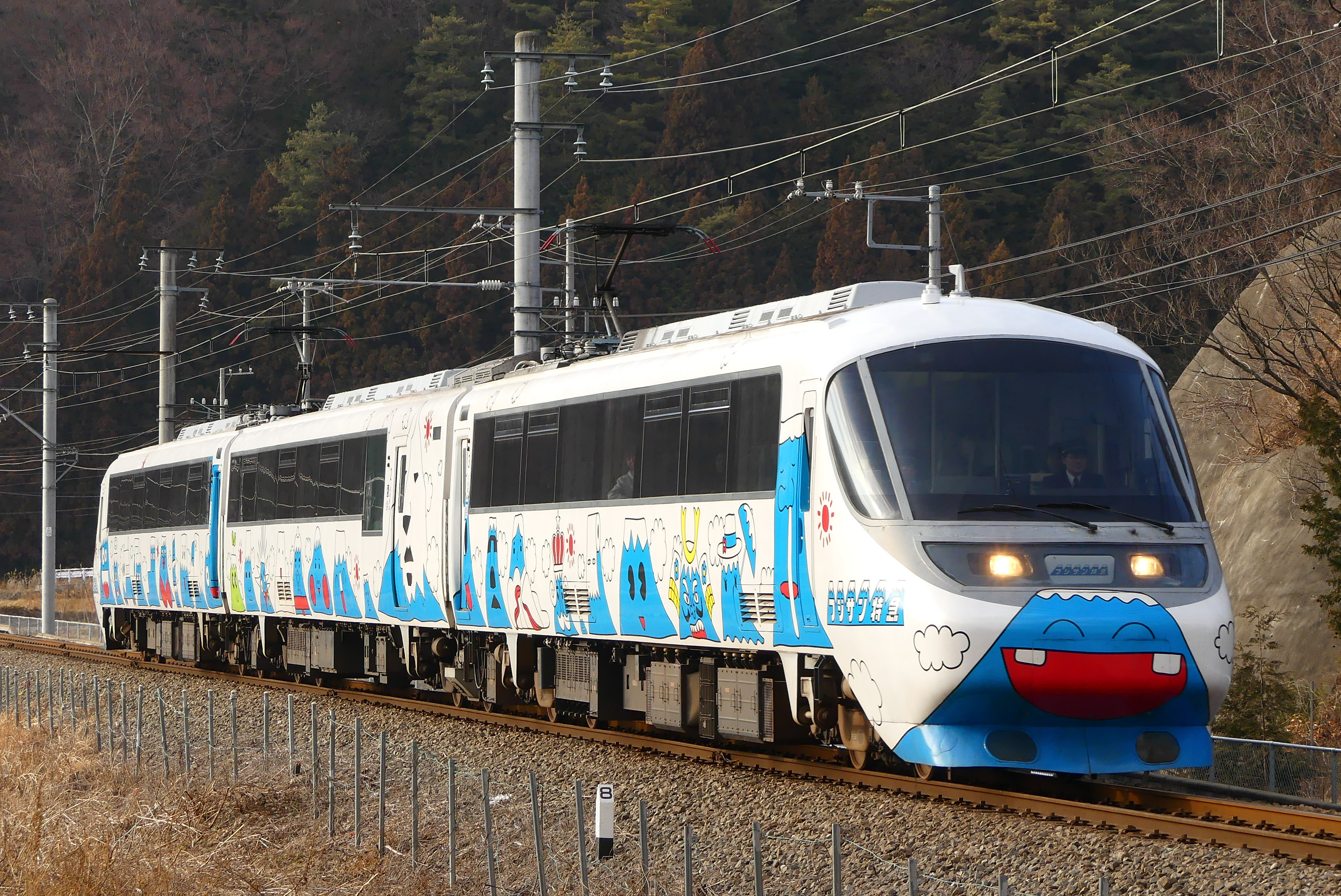
The Fujikyu 8000 series in January 2018

The remaining set, 20002, was moved to the Nippon Sharyo factory in Toyokawa, Aichi, in November 2013, where it was reformed and converted to become a 3-car Fujikyu 8000 series set for use on Fuji Kyuko Fujisan Limited Express services from July 2014.
