= Boeki Center Station =

Railway station in Kobe, Hyogo prefecture, Japan

Coordinates: 34°41′21.82″N 135°11′58.04″E

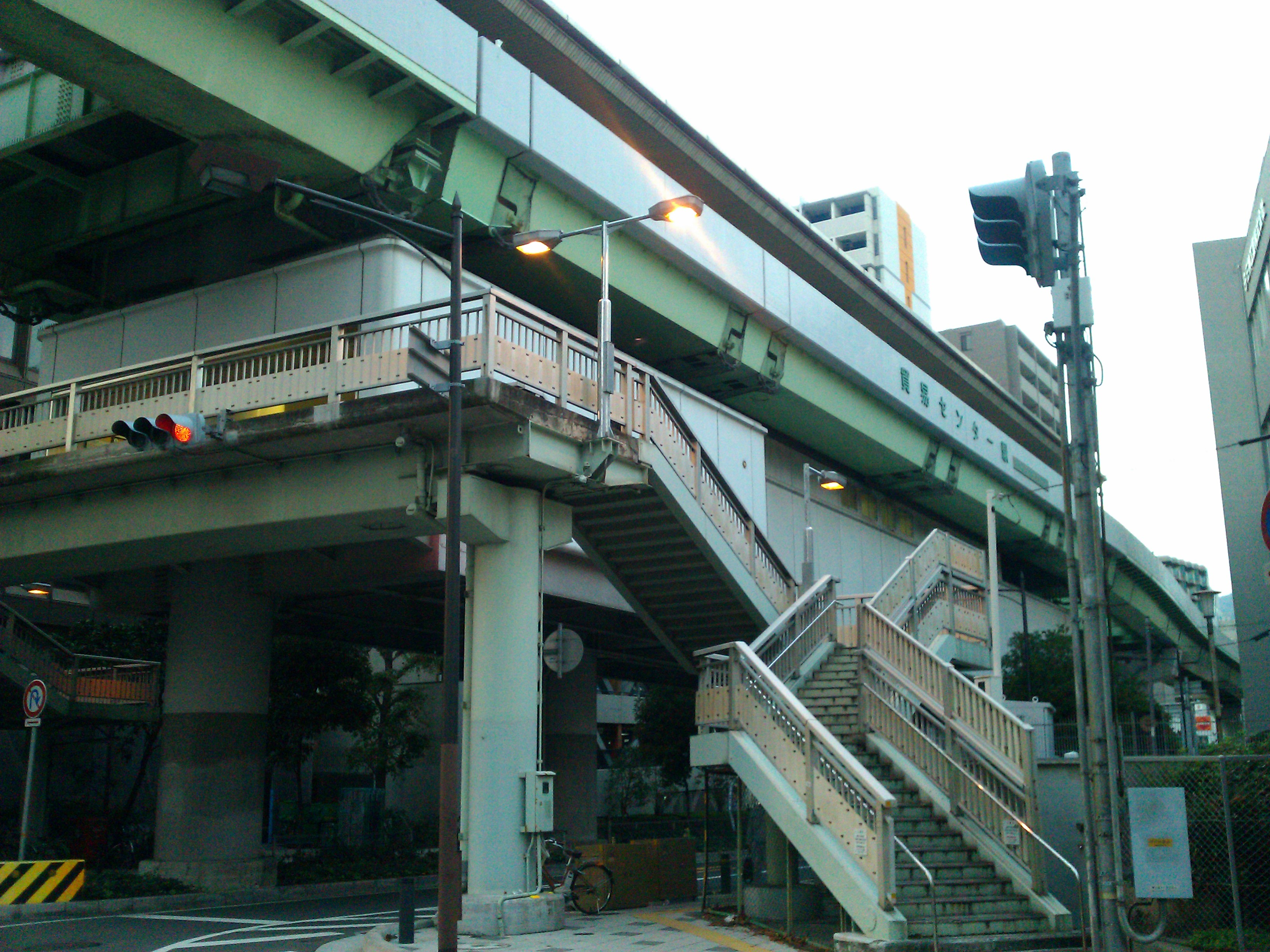
Bōeki Center Station

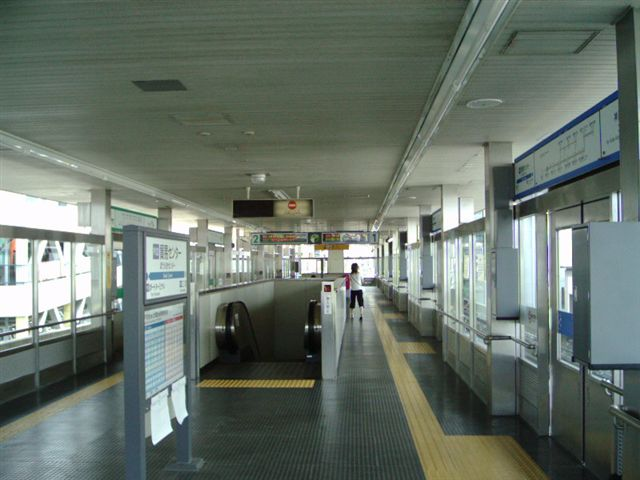
Bōeki Center Station home

Bōeki Center Station (貿易センター駅, Bōeki-Sentā-eki) is a railway station in Hyōgo Prefecture. It is located on the Port Liner in Chūō-ku, Kobe, Japan. Bōeki literally means trade in English. It is the only other station other than Sannomiya and Port Terminal to be on Honshu (Japan's main Island).

It is located heading towards the southern terminus of Kobe Airport Station.

== Stations next to Boeki Center ==
Portliner
Local (普通)

Sannomiya (P01) - Boeki Center (P02) - Port Terminal (P03)
