= Sumiyoshi Station (Kobe) =

Sumiyoshi Station (住吉駅, Sumiyoshi-eki) in Kobe, Japan may refer to:

- Sumiyoshi Station (Hanshin) (ja:住吉駅 (阪神)) in Higashinada-ku, Kobe on the Hanshin Electric Railway Main Line
- Sumiyoshi Station (JR West) (ja:住吉駅 (JR西日本)) in Higashinada-ku, Kobe on the JR West Tokaido Main Line (JR Kobe Line) and the Kobe New Transit Rokko Island Line
