= Fukae Station =

Railway station in Kobe, Japan

Fukae Station 深江駅
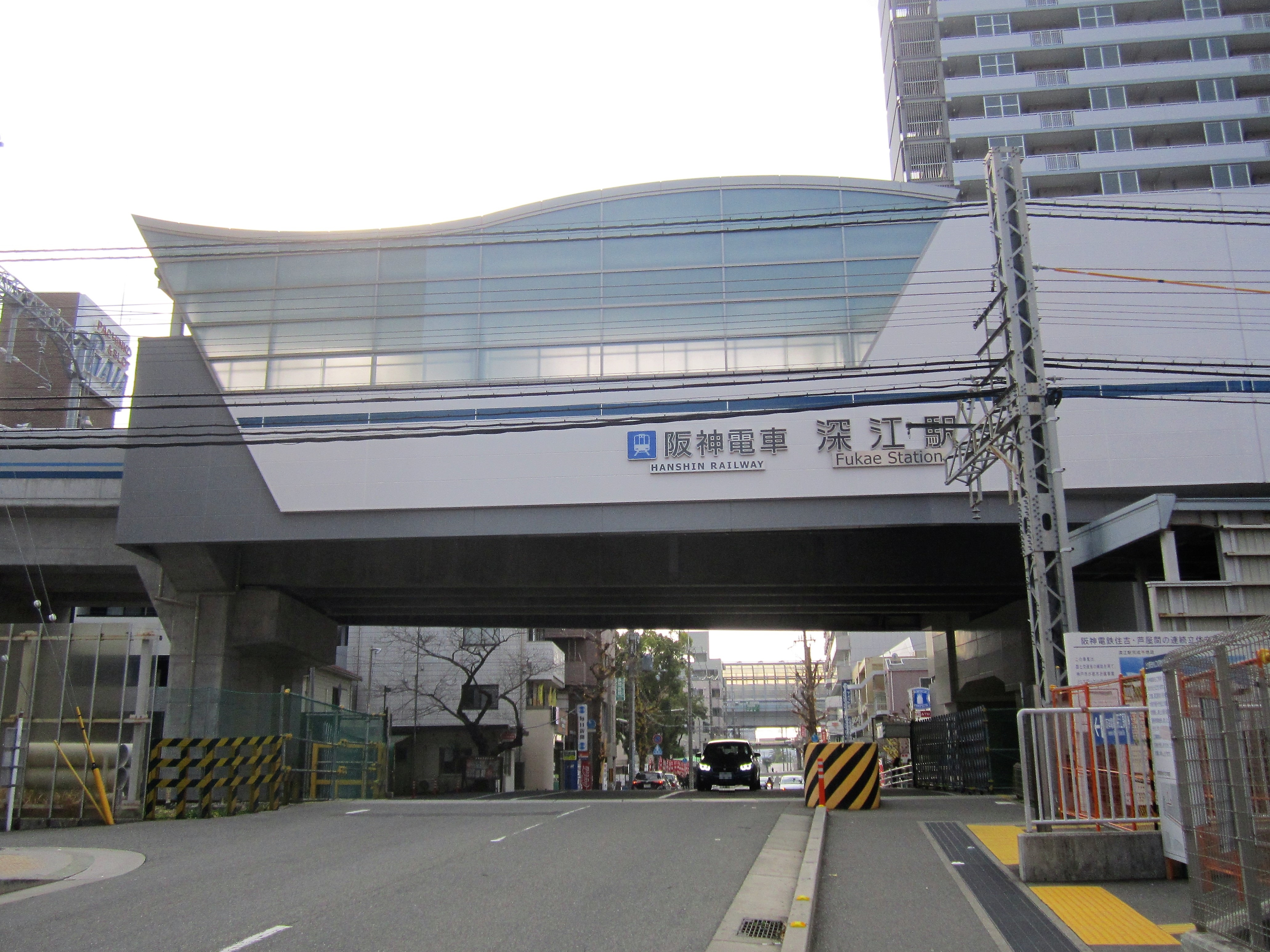
- Station Building in 2020

General information
- Location: Fukaekita-machi 4-chōme, Higashinada, Kobe, Hyōgo （神戸市東灘区深江北町四丁目） Japan
- Coordinates: 34°43′22″N 135°17′29″E
- Operator: Hanshin
- Line: Main Line
- Platforms: 2
- Tracks: 2
- Connections: Bus stop

Other information
- Station code: HS 21

History
- Opened: 1905

Passengers
- 2019: 18,277 (daily)

Services
Preceding station	Hanshin	Following station
Ashiya HS 20 towards Osaka-Umeda	Main Line Local	Ōgi HS 22 towards Motomachi
Ashiya HS 20 towards Osaka-Umeda	Main Line Morning Limited Express (weekdays)	Ōgi HS 22 One-way operation
Location

Fukae Station (深江駅, Fukae-eki) is a railway station in Higashinada-ku, Kobe, Hyōgo Prefecture, Japan. It is owned and operated by private operator Hanshin Electric Railway.

== Layout ==
This station consists of two opposed elevated side platforms serving two tracks.

1	■ ■Main Line	for Koshien, Amagasaki, Osaka (Umeda), Namba, and Nara
2	■ Main Line	for Sannomiya, Kosoku Kobe, Akashi, and Himeji

== History ==
Fukae Station opened on April 12, 1905 along with the rest of the Hanshin Main Line.

On January 17, 1995, the station was damaged by the Great Hanshin earthquake. Service in the affected area was restored by June 26, 1995.

Station numbering was introduced on 21 December 2013, with Fukae being designated as station number HS-21.

Between April 2009 and November 2019, the line between Sumiyoshi Station and Ashiya Station underwent grade separation. The elevated westbound tracks opened for service in December 2015 while the eastbound tracks opened for service on November 30, 2019.

== Gallery ==
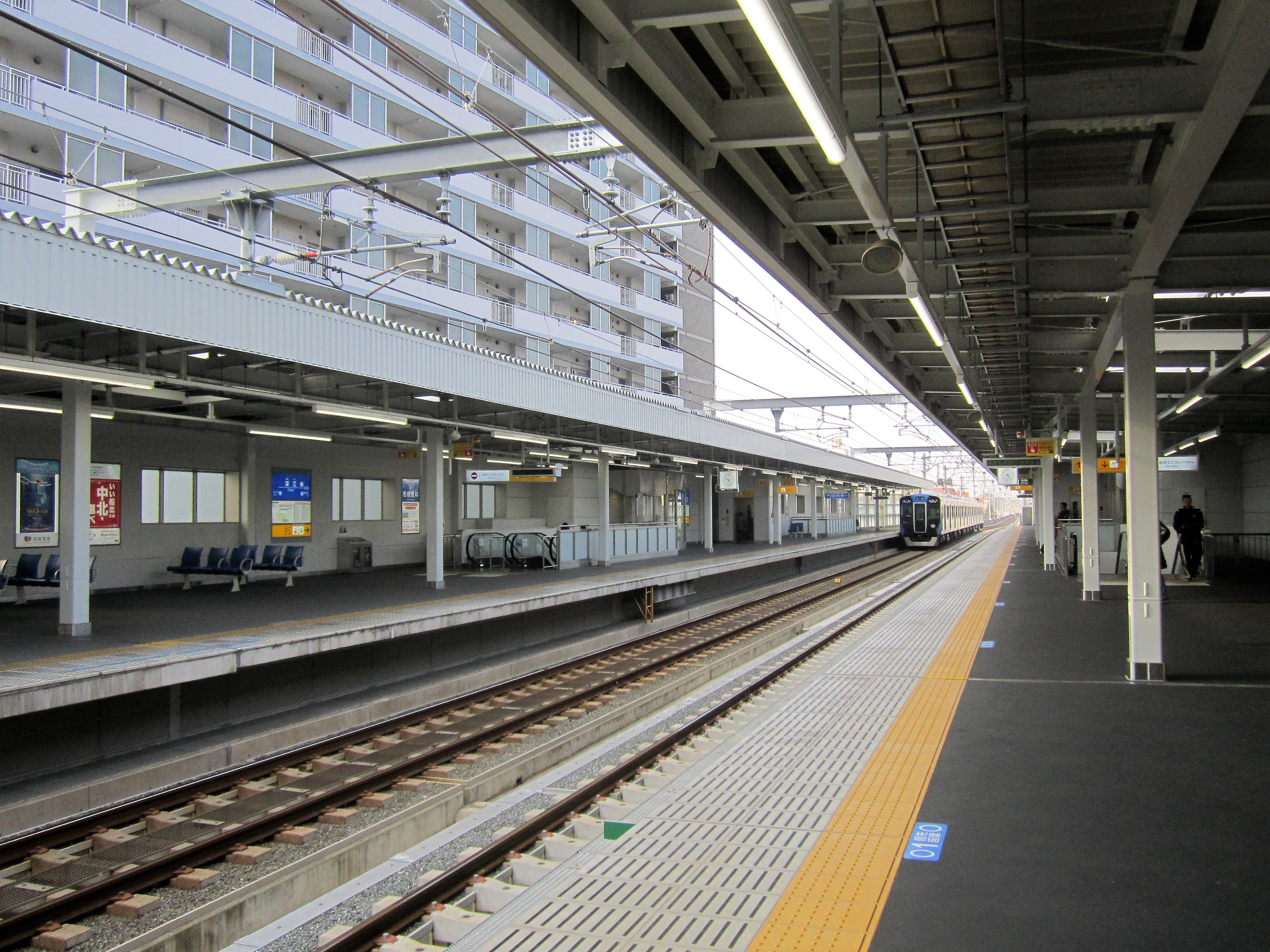
Elevated platforms as seen in 2020

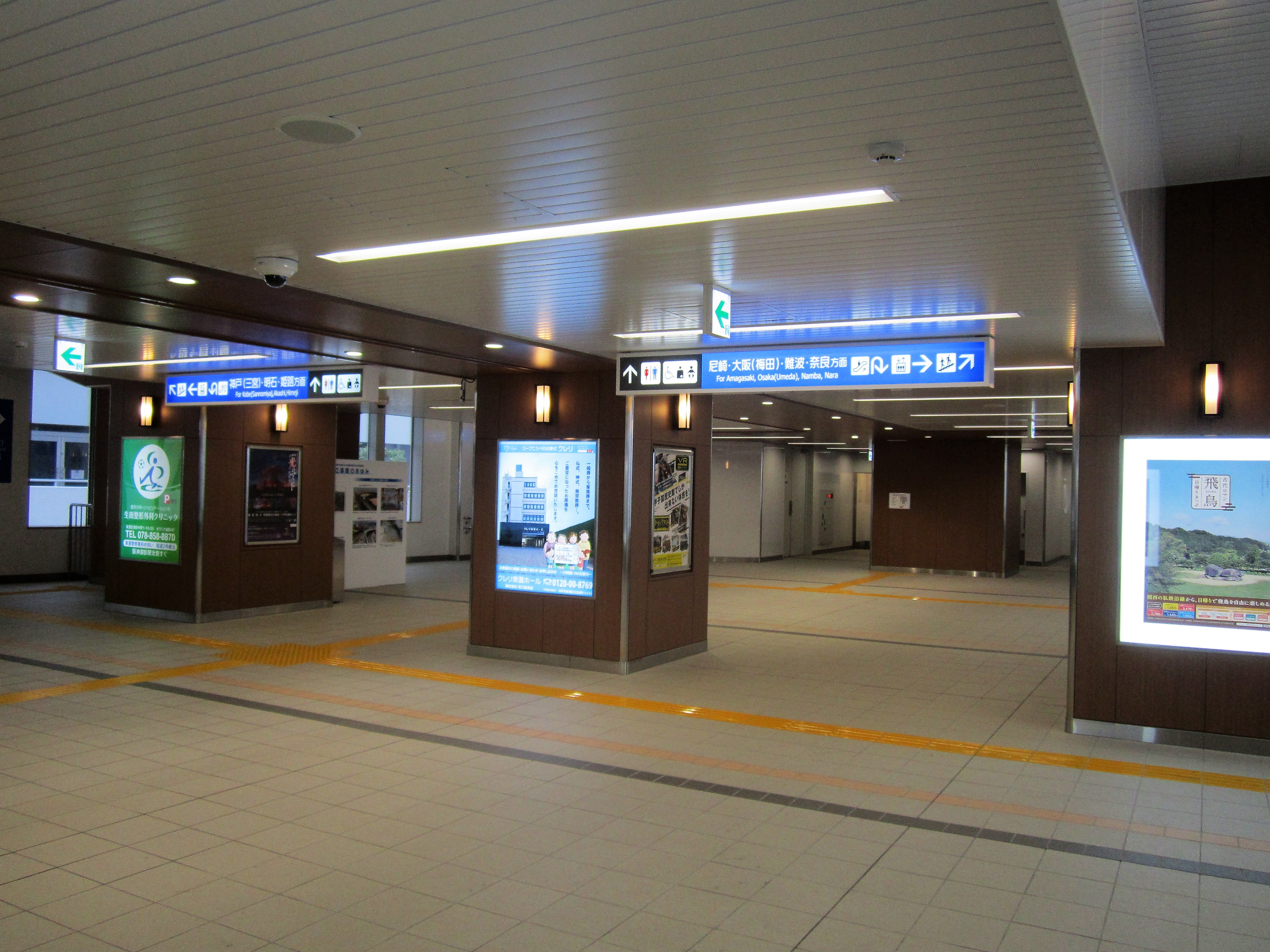
Station concourse at the conclusion of grade separation work
