= Ōgi Station (Hyōgo) =

Railway station in Kobe, Japan

Ōgi Station 青木駅
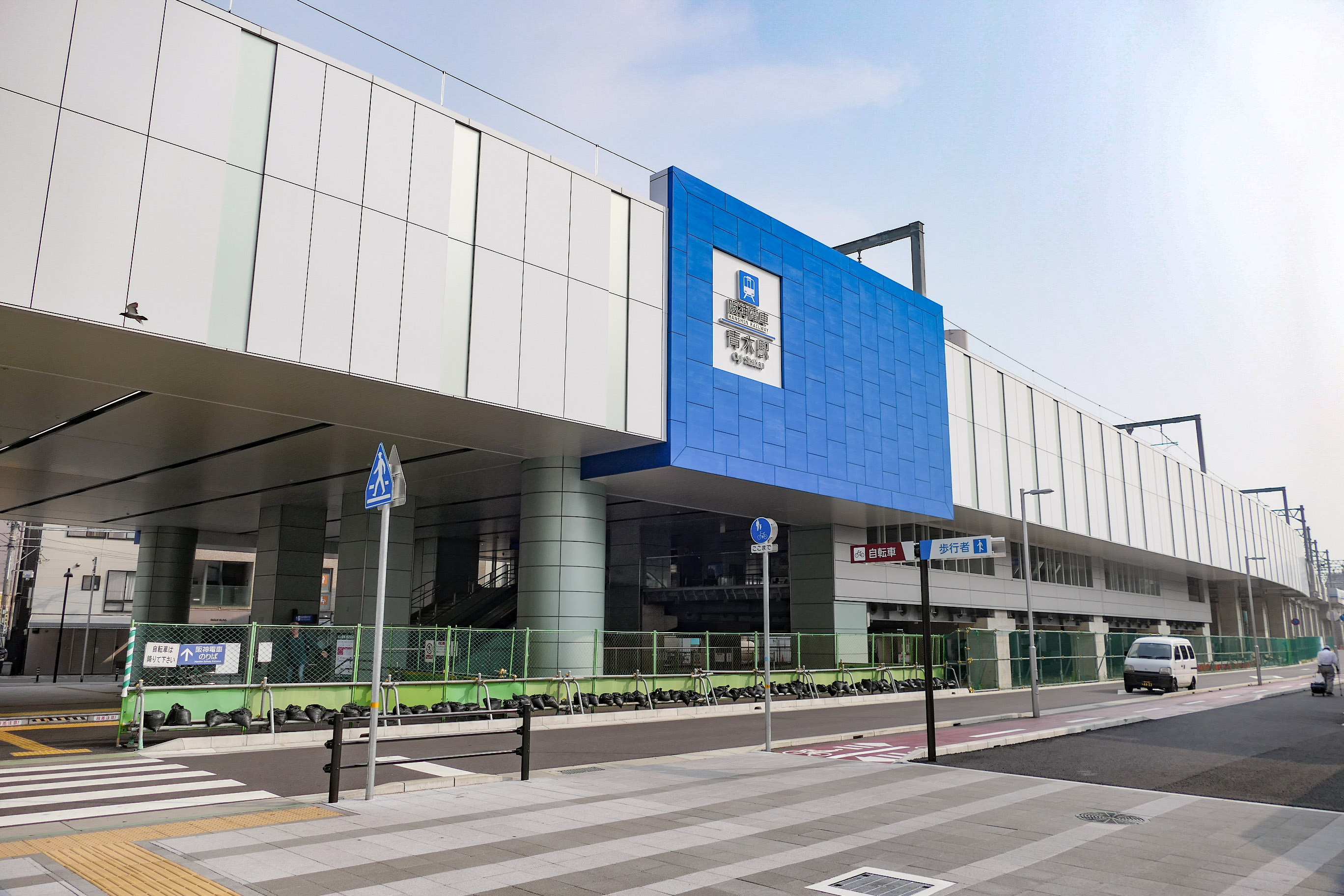

General information
- Location: Kita-Ōgi 3-chome, Higashinada, Kobe, Hyōgo （神戸市東灘区北青木三丁目） Japan
- Coordinates: 34°43′01″N 135°16′50″E
- Operator: Hanshin Electric Railway Co., Ltd.
- Line: Main Line
- Tracks: 4
- Connections: Buses

Other information
- Station code: HS 22

History
- Opened: 1905

Passengers
- 2019: 15,352 (daily)
Services
Preceding station	Hanshin	Following station
Fukae HS 21 towards Osaka-Umeda	Main Line Local	Uozaki HS 23 towards Motomachi
Ashiya HS 20 towards Osaka-Umeda	Main Line Morning Express	Terminus
Fukae HS 21 towards Osaka-Umeda	Main Line Morning Limited Express	Uozaki HS 23 One-way operation
Location

Ōgi Station (青木駅, Ōgi-eki) is an elevated station on the Hanshin Electric Railway Main Line in Japan, with trains travelling east to Hanshin's terminal in Umeda (Osaka), and west to central Kobe (Motomachi and Sannomiya).

== Layout ==
The station has four tracks with two island platforms.

1	■ ■Main Line	for Koshien, Amagasaki, Osaka (Umeda), Namba, and Nara
2	■ ■Main Line	for Koshien, Amagasaki, Osaka (Umeda), Namba, and Nara
3	■ Main Line	for Sannomiya, Kosoku Kobe, Akashi, and Himeji
4	■ Main Line	used for dead-head trains

On the days of the events at Hanshin Koshien Stadium, trains stand by at Line 1 and go to Koshien Station to be extra trains for Umeda.

== Surroundings ==
- Sunshine Wharf Kobe (サンシャインワーフ神戸)

== History ==
Ōgi Station opened on April 12, 1905 along with the rest of the Hanshin Main Line.

On January 17, 1995, the station was damaged by the Great Hanshin earthquake. Service in the affected area was restored by June 26, 1995.

Station numbering was introduced on 21 December 2013, with Ōgi being designated as station number HS-22.

Between April 2009 and November 2019, the line between Sumiyoshi Station and Ashiya Station underwent grade separation. The elevated westbound tracks opened for service in December 2015 while the eastbound tracks opened for service on November 30, 2019.

== Gallery ==
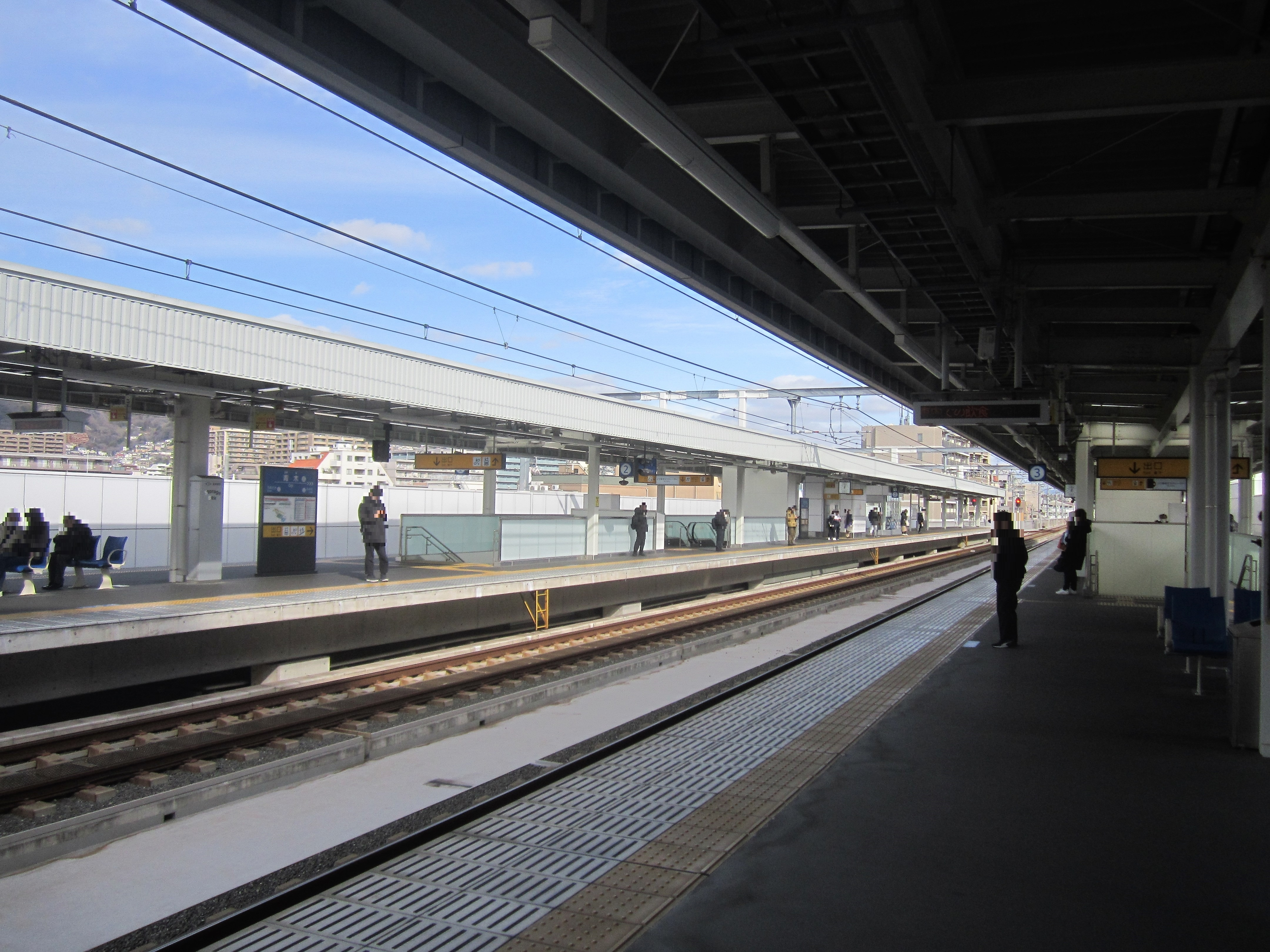
Elevated platforms as seen in 2022

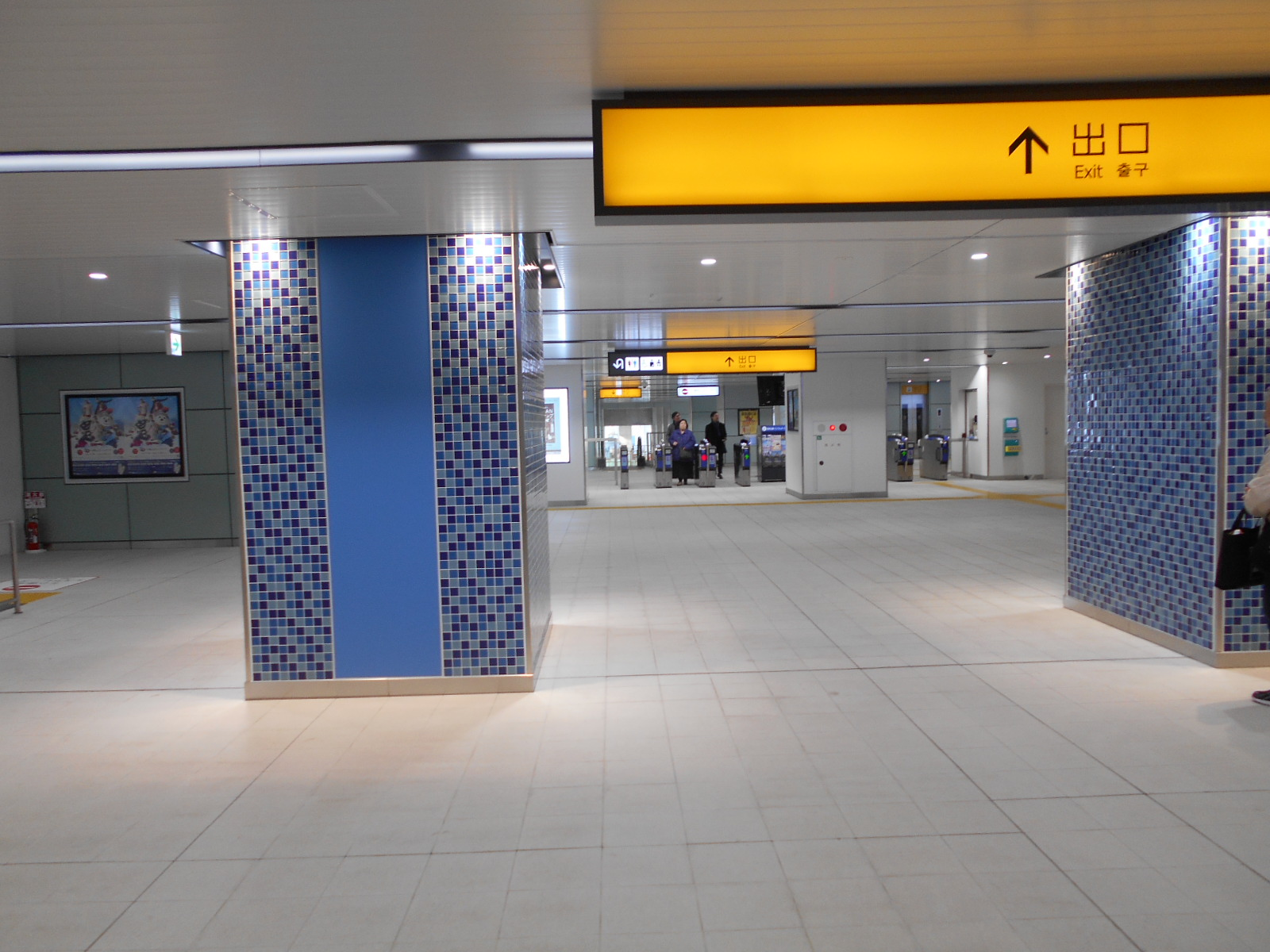
Station concourse at the conclusion of grade separation work
