= Uozaki Station =

Railway station in Kobe, Japan

Uozaki Station 魚崎駅

General information
- Location: Higashinada, Kobe, Hyōgo （神戸市東灘区） Japan
- Operator: Hanshin Electric Railway Co.; Ltd.; Kobe New Transit Co.; Ltd.
Location

Uozaki Station (魚崎駅, Uozaki-eki) is a partially elevated railway station on the Hanshin Electric Railway Main Line, just east of Sumiyoshi River, Japan. Trains travel east to Hanshin's terminal in Umeda (Osaka), and west to central Kobe (Motomachi and Sannomiya). At Motomachi, a number of limited express trains carry on along the Sanyo Railway to Himeji city.

It is also possible to change at this station for the Rokko Liner, a driverless system from JR Sumiyoshi to Rokko Island. The two stations of Uozaki are linked by a covered walkway.

== Lines ==
Uozaki Station is served by the Hanshin Main Line, and is 23.8 km (14.8 mi) from the terminus at Ōsaka Namba Station. It is also served by the Kobe New Transit Line, and is 1.2 km (0.75 mi) from the terminus at Sumiyoshi.

== Hanshin Main Line ==
=== Layout ===
Uozaki Station 魚崎駅
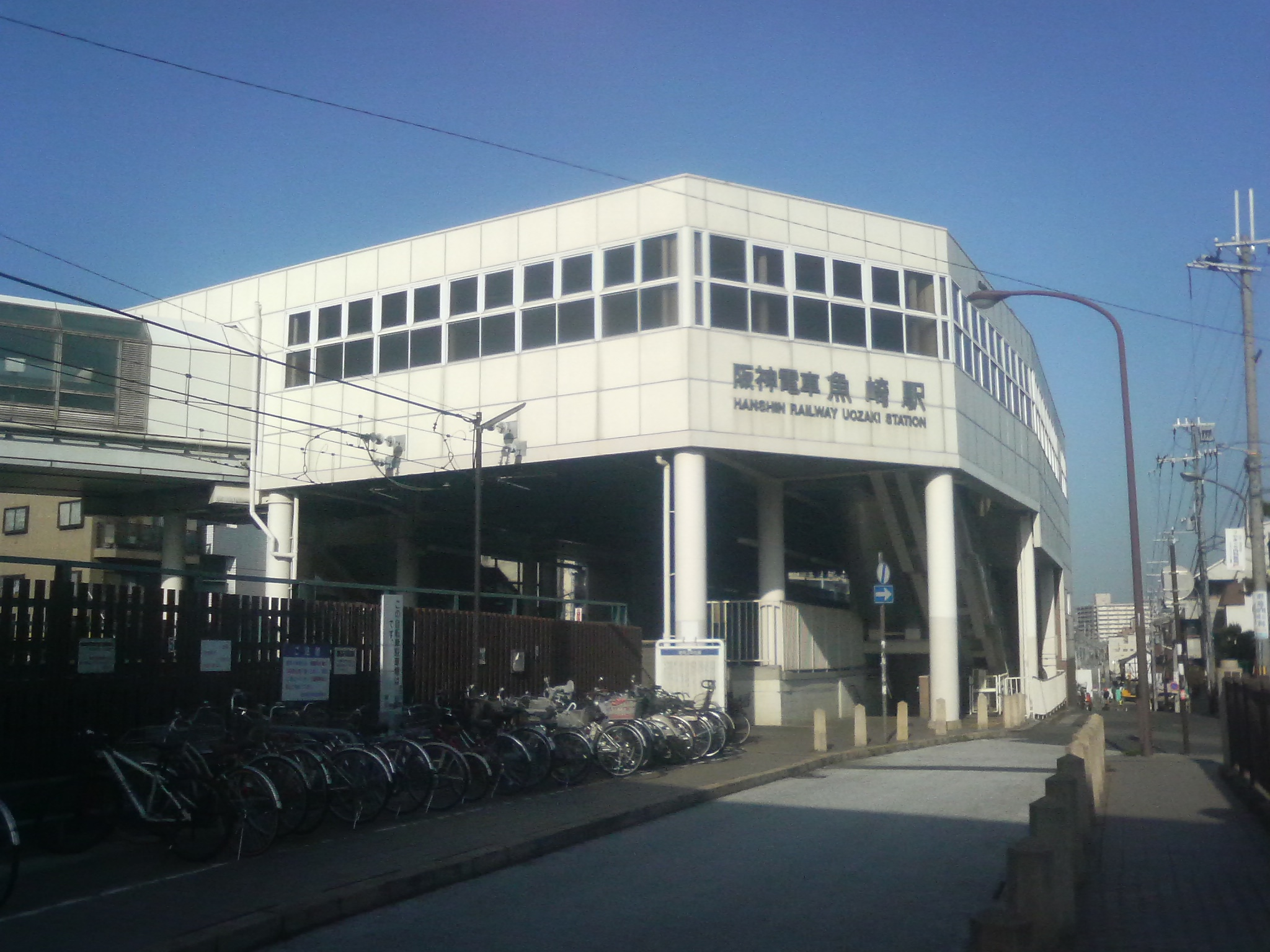

General information
- Location: Uozaki Nakamachi Yonchome, Higashinada, Kobe, Hyōgo （神戸市東灘区魚崎中町四丁目） Japan
- Coordinates: 34°42′45.31″N 135°16′9.33″E
- System: Hanshin Railway station
- Operator: Hanshin Electric Railway Co., Ltd.
- Line: Main Line

Other information
- Station code: HS 23

History
- Opened: 12 April 1905

Passengers
- 2019: 30,120 (daily)

Services
Hanshin Railway Main Line (HS 23)
Ogi (HS 22)	Local	Sumiyoshi (HS 24)
Ashiya (HS 20)	Express (1 Mikage-bound train only)	Mikage (HS 25)
Nishinomiya (HS 17); Ashiya (HS 20) (except weekends and holidays)	Rapid Express	Kobe Sannomiya (HS 32)
Ogi (HS 22)	Morning Limited Express (Osaka-Umeda-bound trains only)	Mikage (HS 25)
Ashiya (HS 20)	Limited Express	Mikage (HS 25)
Ashiya (HS 20)	Direct Limited Express	Mikage (HS 25)
Location

There are two tracks and two side platforms. It also has lifts and escalators, as well as waiting rooms on each platform.

1	■ ■■Main Line	for Koshien, Amagasaki, Osaka (Umeda), Namba, and Nara
2	■ ■■Main Line	for Kobe Sannomiya, Kosoku Kobe, Akashi, and Himeji

=== History ===
Uozaki Station opened on the Hanshin Main Line on 12 April 1905.

Service was suspended owing to the Great Hanshin earthquake in January 1995. Restoration work on the Hanshin Main Line took 7 months to complete.

Station numbering was introduced on 21 December 2013, with Uozaki being designated as station number HS-25.

=== Gallery ===
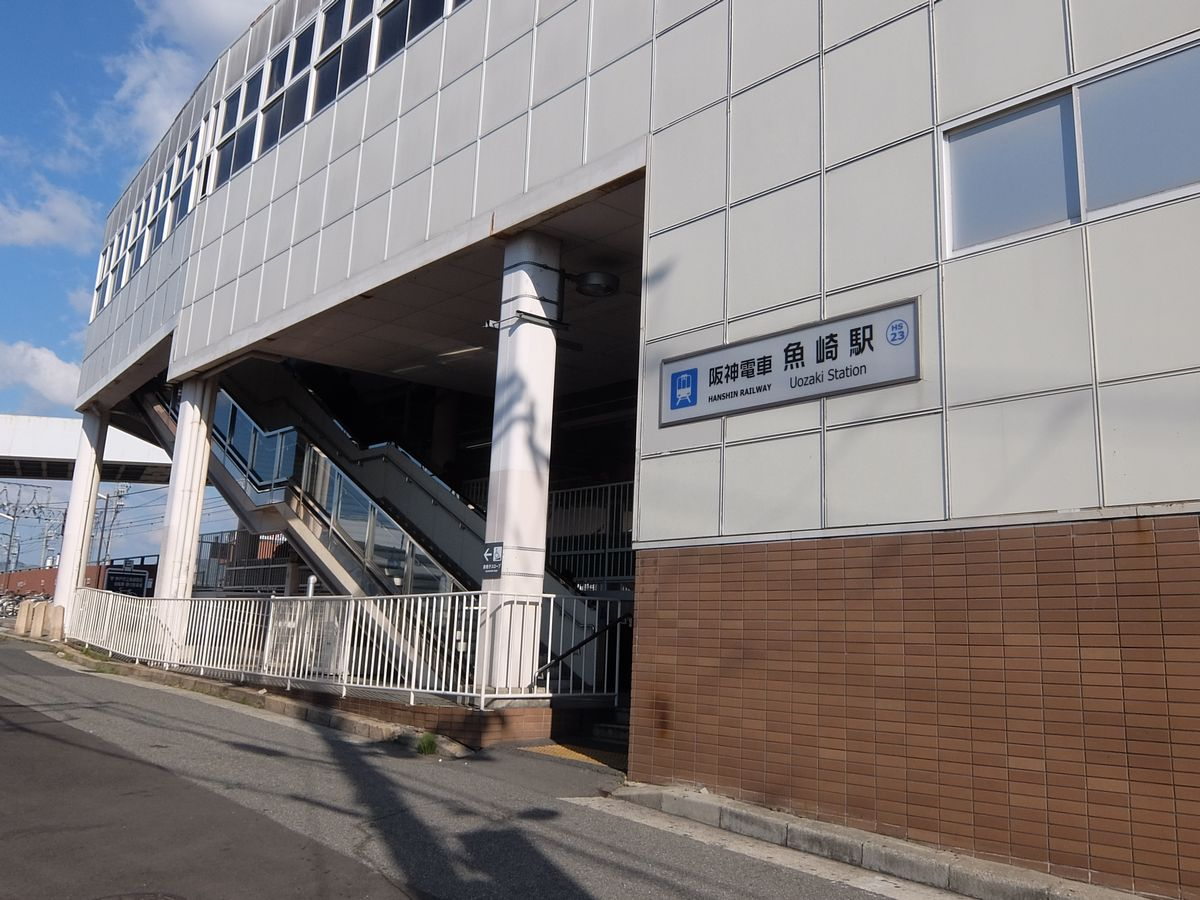
Hanshin Line station building

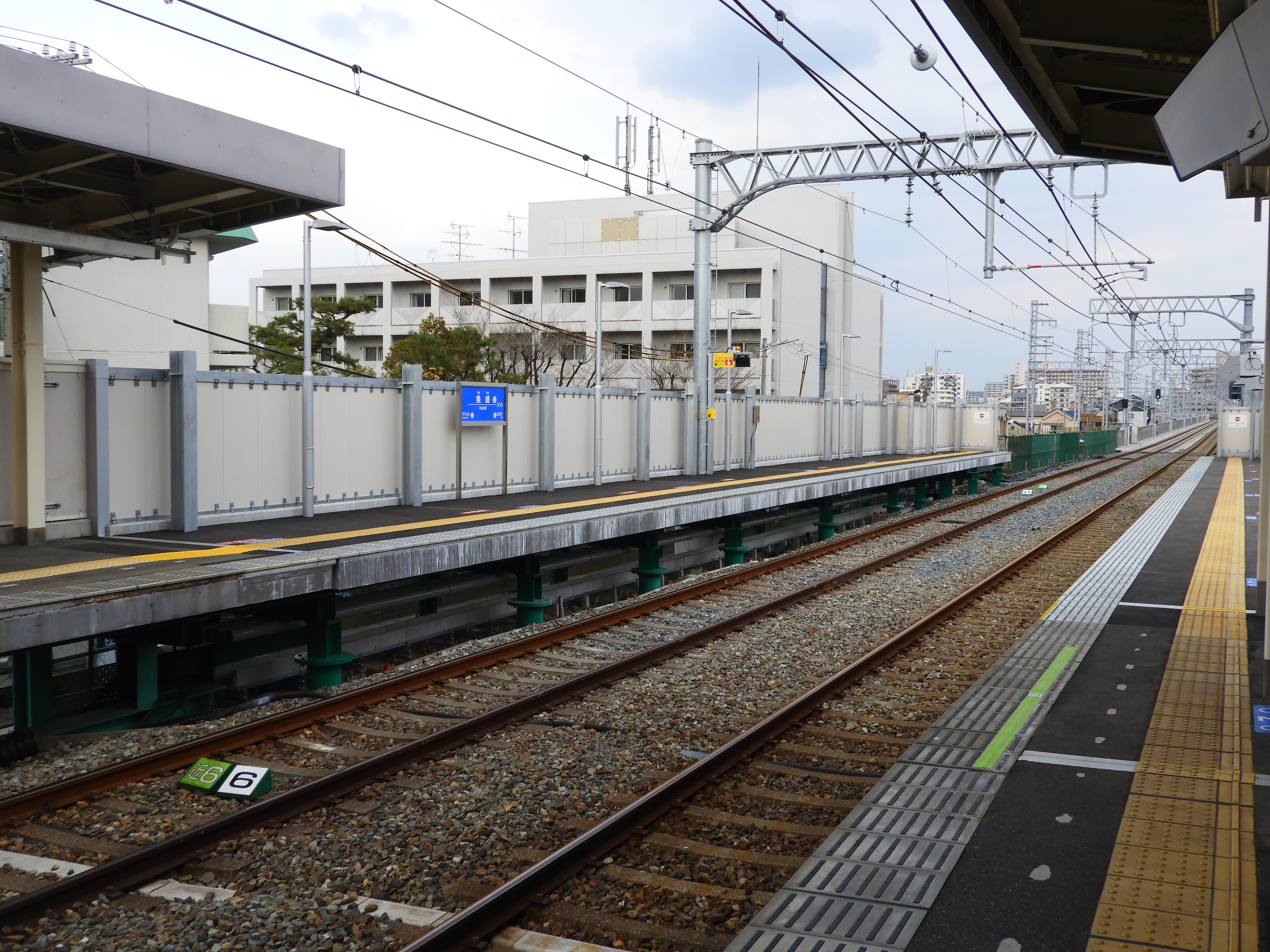
Hanshin platforms

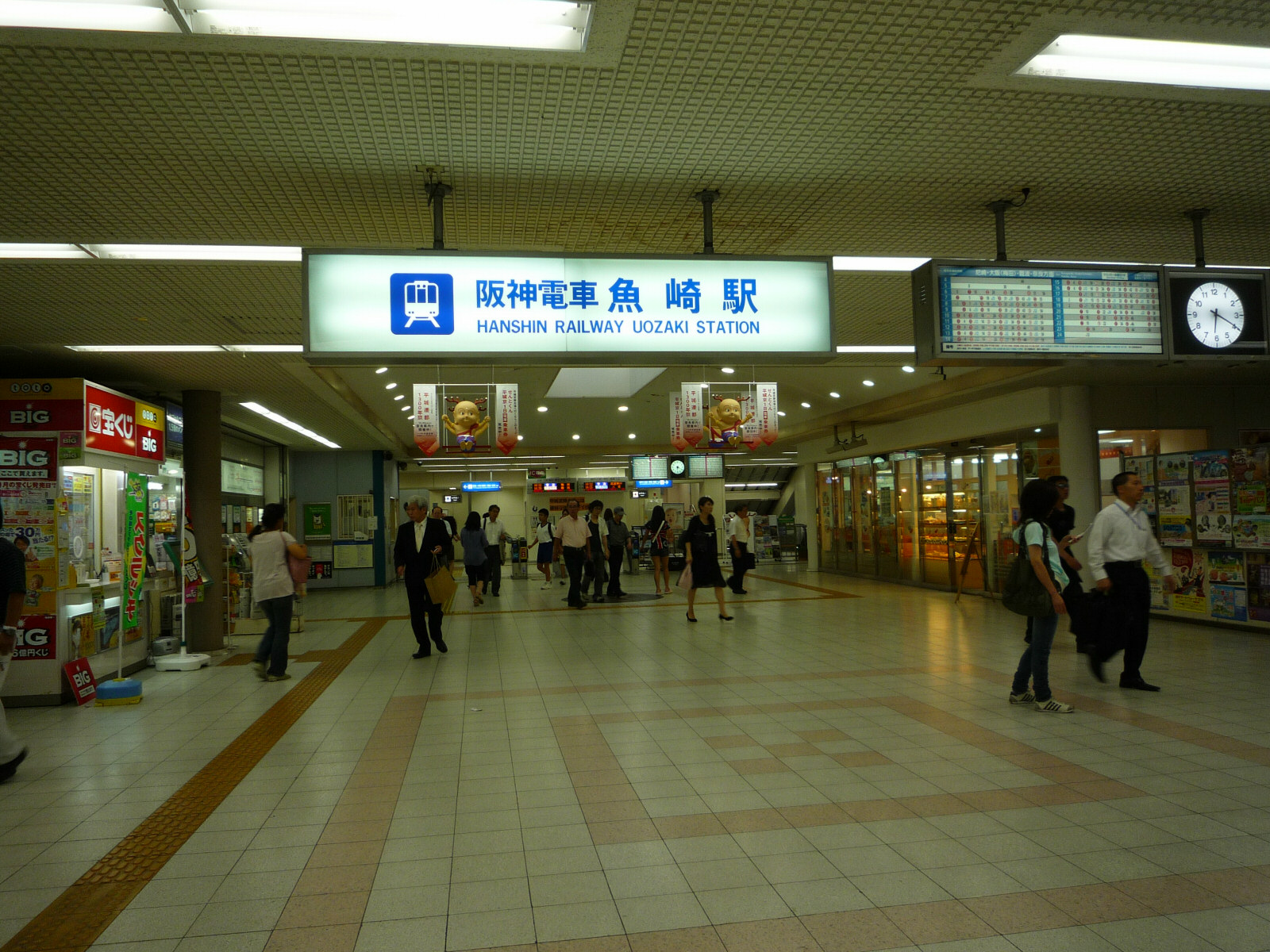
Station concourse in 2011

== Kobe New Transit Line ==
=== Layout ===
Uozaki Station 魚崎駅
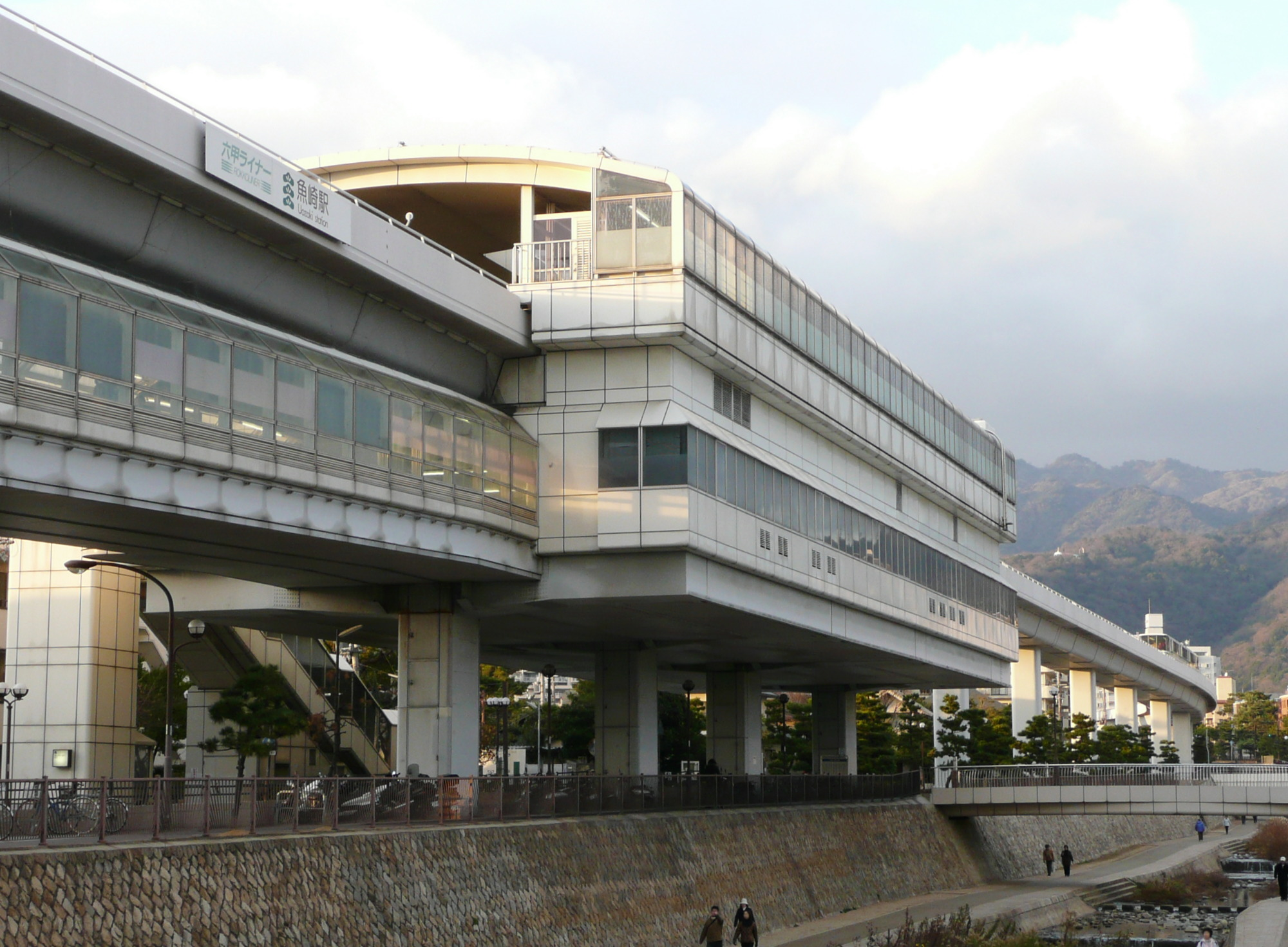

General information
- Location: Uozaki Nishimachi Yonchome, Higashinada, Kobe, Hyōgo （神戸市東灘区魚崎西町四丁目） Japan
- Coordinates: 34°42′49.37″N 135°16′6.89″E
- System: Kobe New Transit station
- Operator: Kobe New Transit Co., Ltd.
- Line: Rokko Island Line (Rokko Liner)

Other information
- Station code: R02

History
- Opened: 1990

Services
Kobe New Transit Rokko Island Line (R02)
Sumiyoshi (R01)	-	Minami-Uozaki (R03)
Location

The station has two tracks and two side platforms. It also has lifts and escalators.

1	■ Rokko Liner	for Marine Park
2	■ Rokko Liner	to Sumiyoshi

=== History ===
The station on the Kobe New Transit Line opened on 21 February 1990.

=== Gallery ===
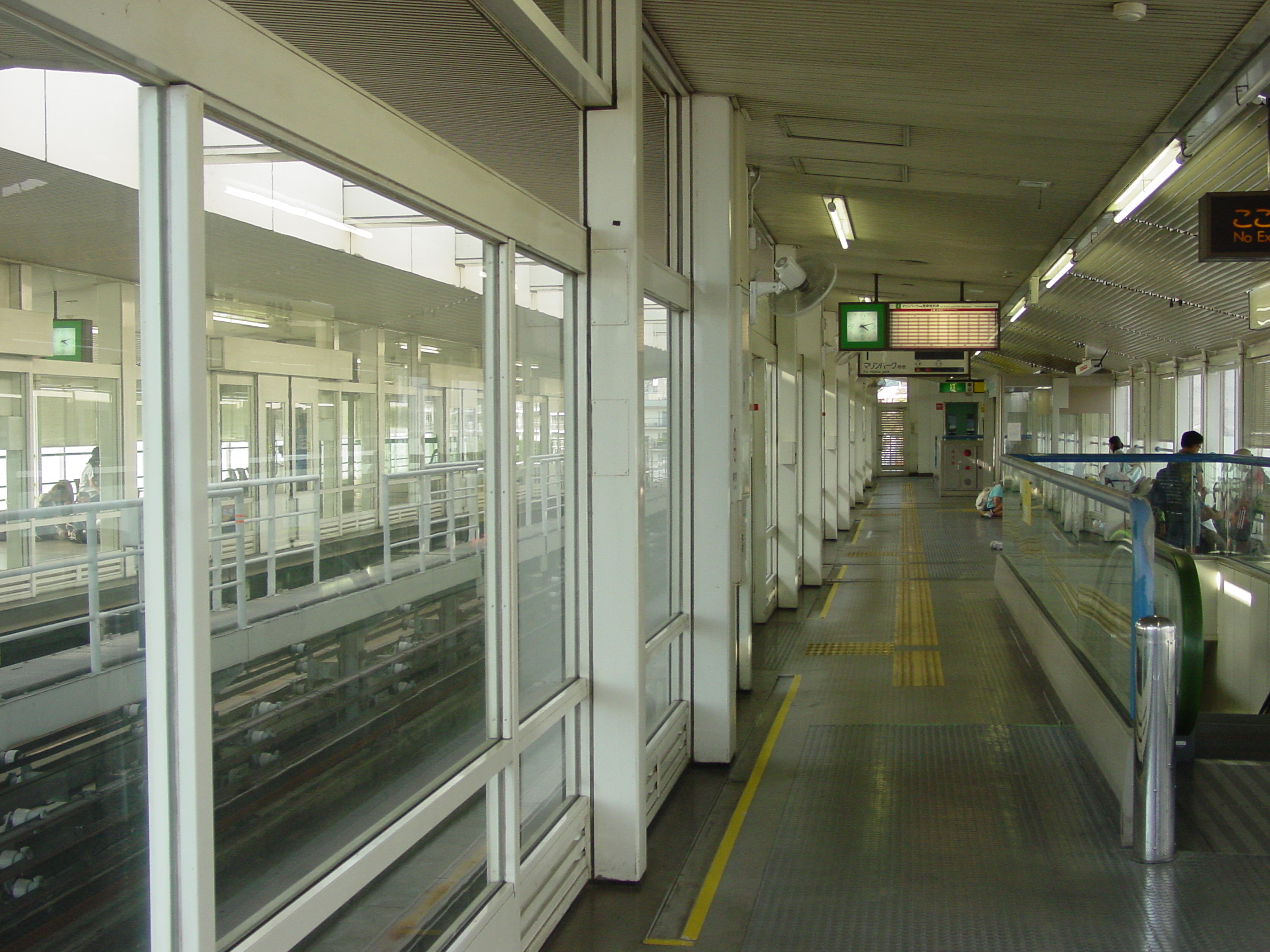
Kobe New Transit Line platforms

== Surroundings ==
- Sumiyoshi River
