= Uchide Station =

Railway station in Ashiya, Hyōgo Prefecture, Japan

Uchide Station 打出駅
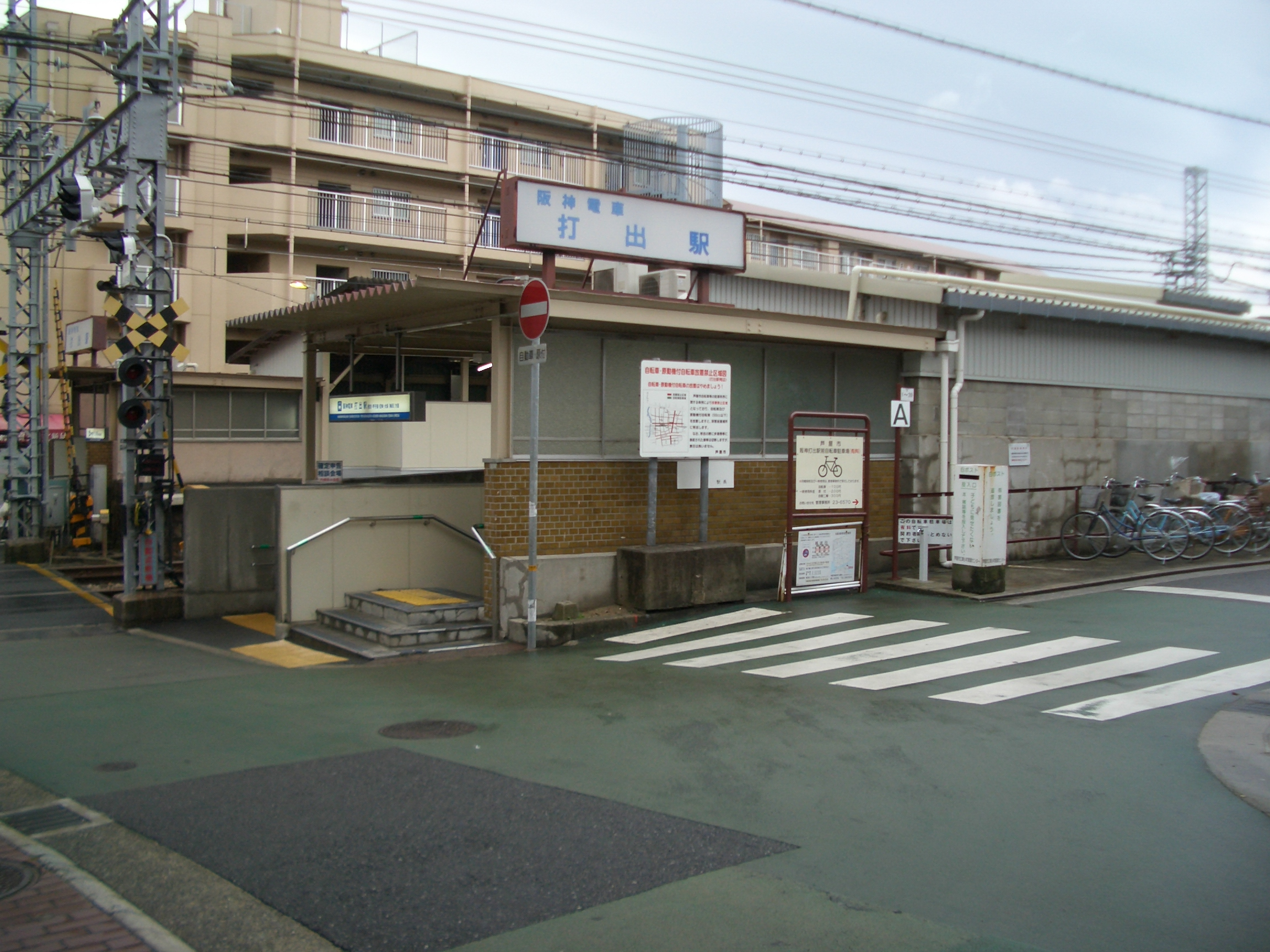
- Uchide Station

General information
- Location: 2, Uchidekozuchi-chō, Ashiya-shi, Hyōgo-ken 659-0027; Japan
- Coordinates: 34°43′54″N 135°18′56″E
- Operator: Hanshin Electric Railway
- Line: ■ Hanshin Main Line
- Distance: 19.0 km (11.8 miles) from Umeda
- Platforms: 2 side platforms
- Tracks: 2
- Connections: Bus stop

Other information
- Station code: HS 19
- Website: Official website

History
- Opened: April 12, 1905

Passengers
- 2019: 13,564 (daily)

Services
Hanshin Main Line
Kōroen (HS 18)	Local	Ashiya (HS 20)
Morning Express (Osaka-Umeda-bound trains only on weekdays): Does not stop at this station
Express (1 Mikage-bound train only on weekdays): Does not stop at this station
Rapid Express: Does not stop at this station
Kōroen (HS 18)	Morning Limited Express (Osaka-Umeda-bound trains only on weekdays)	Ashiya (HS 20)
Limited Express; Through Limited Express: Does not stop at this station
Location
- Location within Hyōgo Prefecture Location within Japan

Uchide Station (打出駅, Uchide-eki; station number: HS-19) is a passenger railway station located in the city of Ashiya Hyōgo Prefecture, Japan. It is operated by the private transportation company Hanshin Electric Railway.

== Lines ==
Uchide Station is served by the Hanshin Main Line, and is located 19.0 kilometers from the terminus of the line at Umeda.

== Layout ==
The station consists of two opposed ground-level side platforms connected by an underground passage.

=== Platforms ===
1	■ ■Main Line	for Koshien, Amagasaki, Osaka (Umeda), Namba, and Nara
2	■ Main Line	for Kobe (Sannomiya), Akashi, and Himeji

== History ==
Uchide Station opened on 12 April 1905 along with the rest of the Hanshin Main Line.

On 12 January 1995, the station was damaged by the Great Hanshin earthquake. Service in the affected area was restored by 26 June 1995.

Station numbering was introduced on 21 December 2013, with Uchide being designated as station number HS-19.

== Passenger statistics ==
In fiscal 2019, the station was used by an average of 13,564 passengers daily

== Surrounding area ==
- Uchideten Shrine (打出天神社, 5 minutes walk from the Station)
- Kanatsuyama Kofun (金津山古墳, 100m from the Station)
- Uchide Kozuchi Kofun (打出小槌古墳, 3 minutes walk from the Station)
- Ashiya City Uchide Education and Culture Center
- Ashiya City Library Uchide branch (芦屋市立図書館打出分室, See also 旧松山家住宅松濤館)

== See also ==
- List of railway stations in Japan
