= Mikage Station (Hanshin) =

Railway station in Kobe, Japan

Mikage Station 御影駅
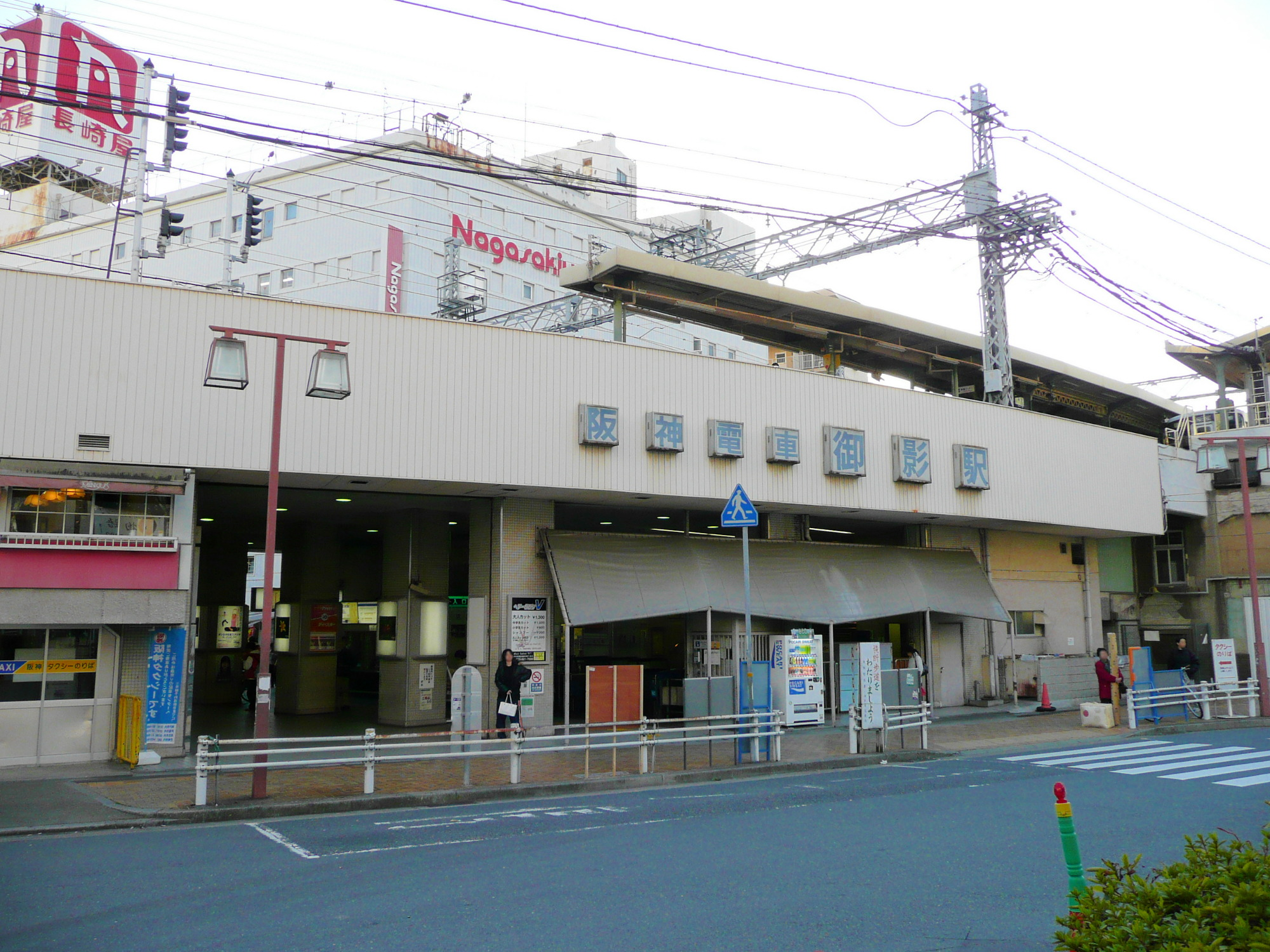
- Mikage Station north entrance

General information
- Location: Mikage Hommachi 1-chome, Higashinada-ku, Kobe-shi, Hyōgo-ken 658-0046; Japan
- Coordinates: 34°42′53″N 135°15′20″E
- Operator: Hanshin Electric Railway
- Line: ■ Hanshin Main Line
- Distance: 25.7 km (16.0 miles) from Umeda
- Platforms: 2 island platforms
- Connections: Bus terminal

Other information
- Station code: HS 25
- Website: Official website

History
- Opened: 12 April 1905

Passengers
- FY2019: 13,142 (daily)

Services
Hanshin Main Line (HS 25)
Sumiyoshi (HS 24)	Local	Ishiyagawa (HS 26)
Uozaki	Express (1 terminating train only on weekdays)	Terminus
Rapid Express: Does not stop at this station
Uozaki (HS 23)	Morning Limited Express (Osaka-Umeda bound trains only on weekdays)	Terminus
Uozaki (HS 23)	Limited Express	Kobe-Sannomiya (HS 32)
Uozaki (HS 23)	Direct Limited Express	Kobe-Sannomiya (HS 32)
Location
- Location within Hyōgo Prefecture Location within Japan

Mikage Station (御影駅, Mikage-eki; station number: HS-25) is a passenger railway station located in Higashinada-ku, Kobe, Hyōgo Prefecture, Japan. It is operated by the private transportation company Hanshin Electric Railway.

== Lines ==
Mikage Station is served by the Hanshin Main Line, and is located 25.7 kilometres (16.0 miles) from the terminus of the line at Umeda.

== Layout ==
The station consists of two elevated island platforms serving four tracks. Part of the platform crosses the Ishiya River. Since the platforms are on a sharp curve (radius 140 m (460 ft) to 160 m (520 ft)), the speed through the premises is limited to 35 km/h (22 mph). The gap between the stopped train and the platform is partially wide, and the width of the platform itself is narrow, making it a particularly dangerous station among Hanshin stations. Due to the narrow width of the platform, there is no waiting room. There is only one ticket gate on the ground level.

=== Platforms ===
1	■ Main Line	limited express trains for Amagasaki and Osaka (Umeda); Change trains at Amagasaki for Namba and Nara
2	■ Main Line	local trains for Amagasaki and Osaka (Umeda); Change trains at Amagasaki for Namba and Nara
3	■ Main Line	limited express trains for Sannomiya, Kosoku Kobe, Shinkaichi, Suma, Akashi, and Himeji
4	■ Main Line	local trains for Sannomiya and Kosoku Kobe

== Gallery ==
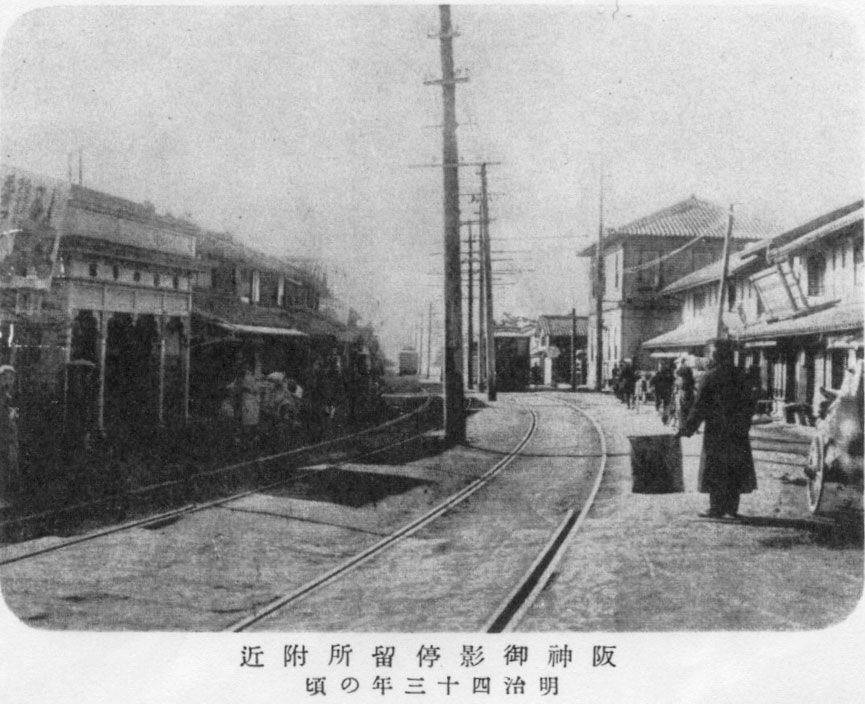
The station in 1910, before the tracks were grade separated and elevated in 1929

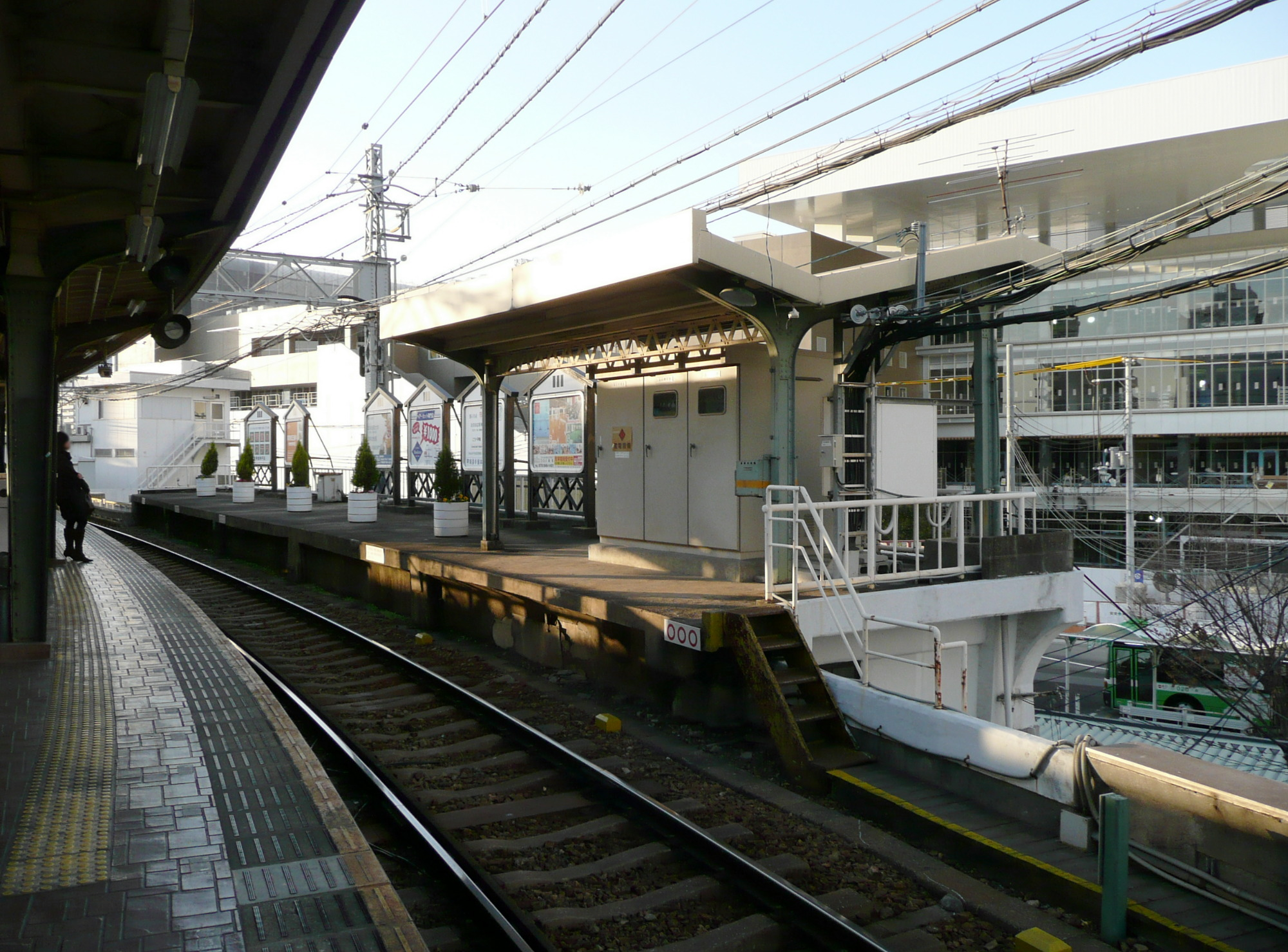
Abandoned freight platforms seen in 2008

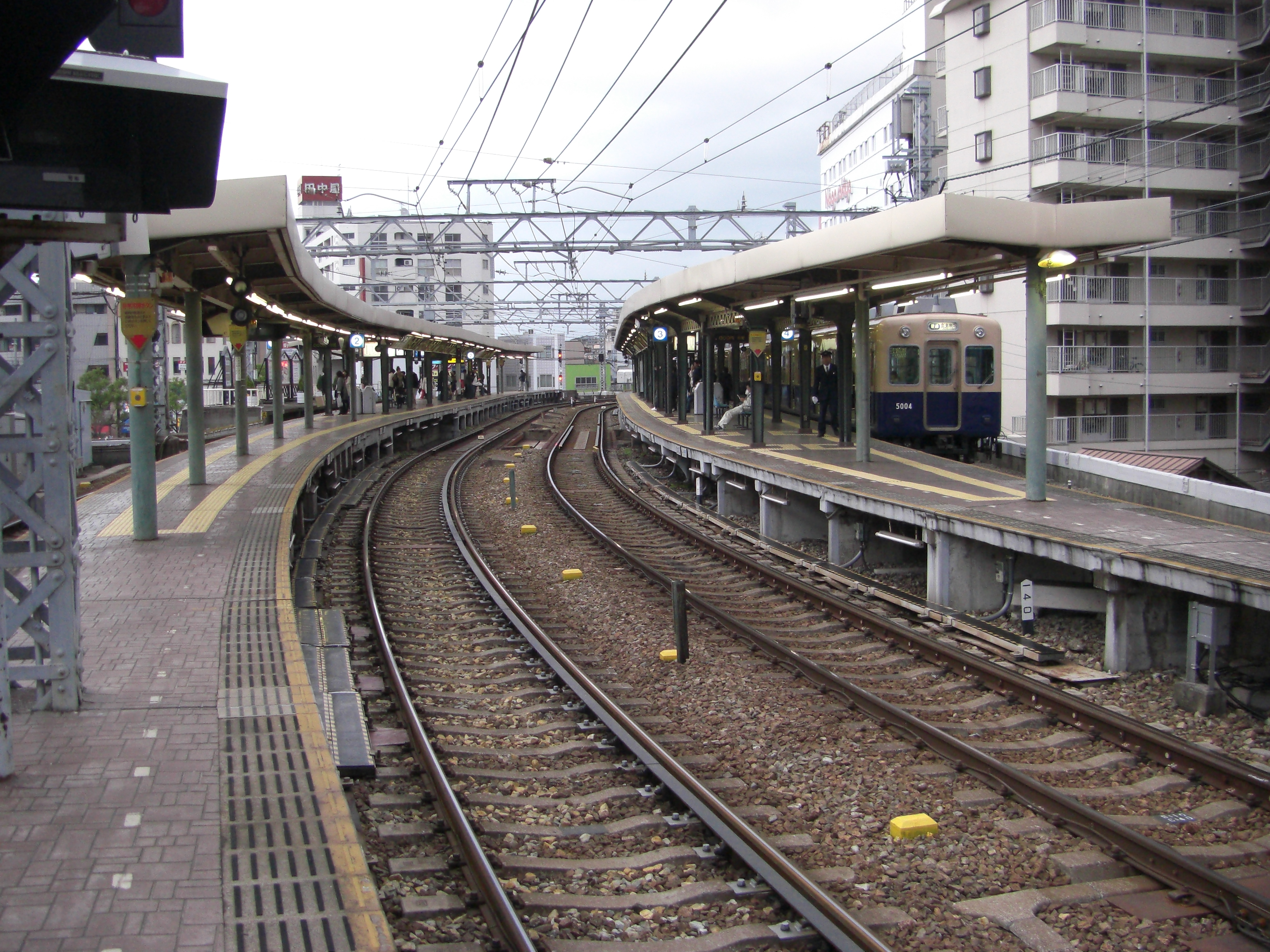
Platforms seen in 2008

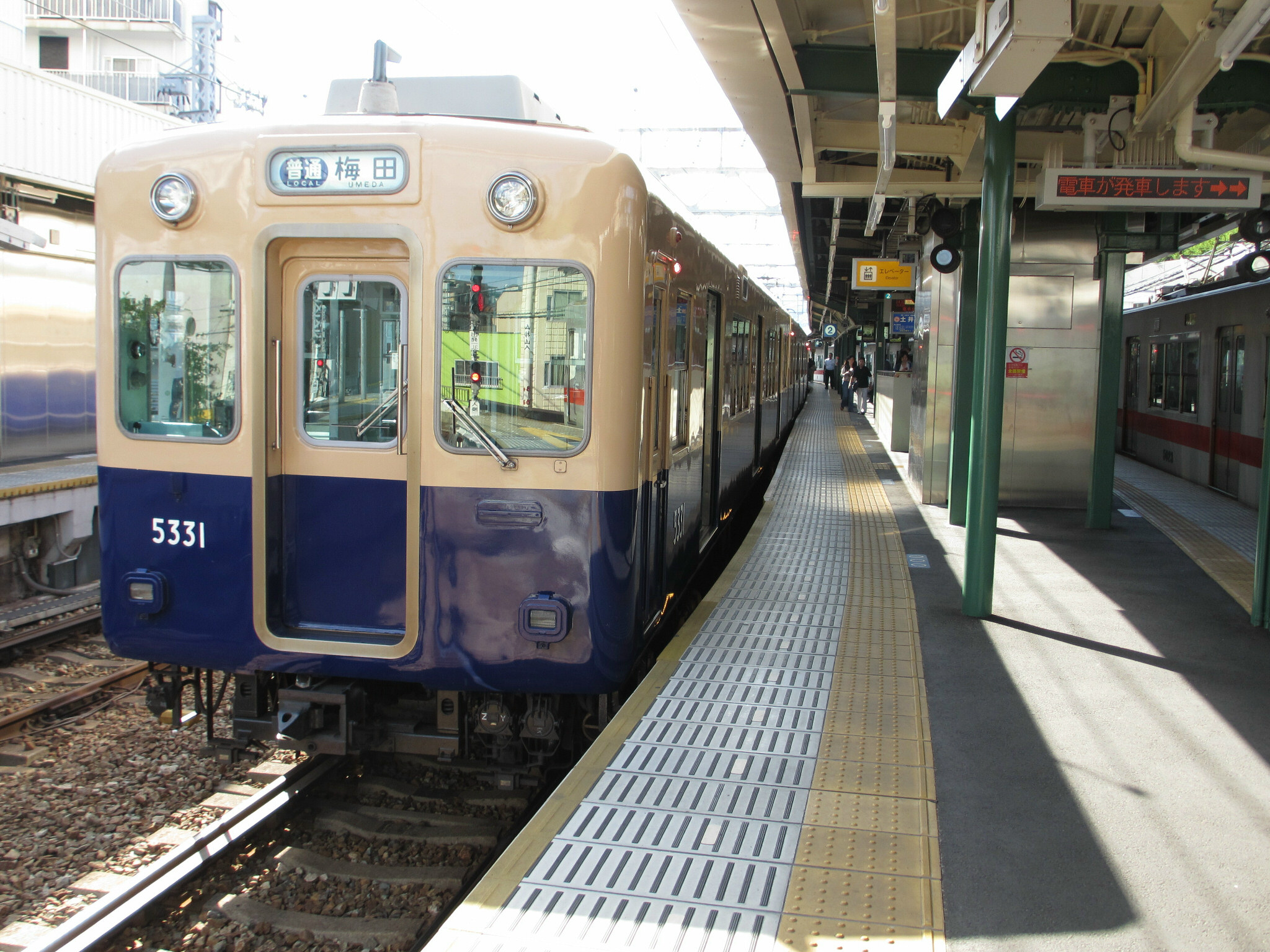
An eastbound local train alighting at platform 2

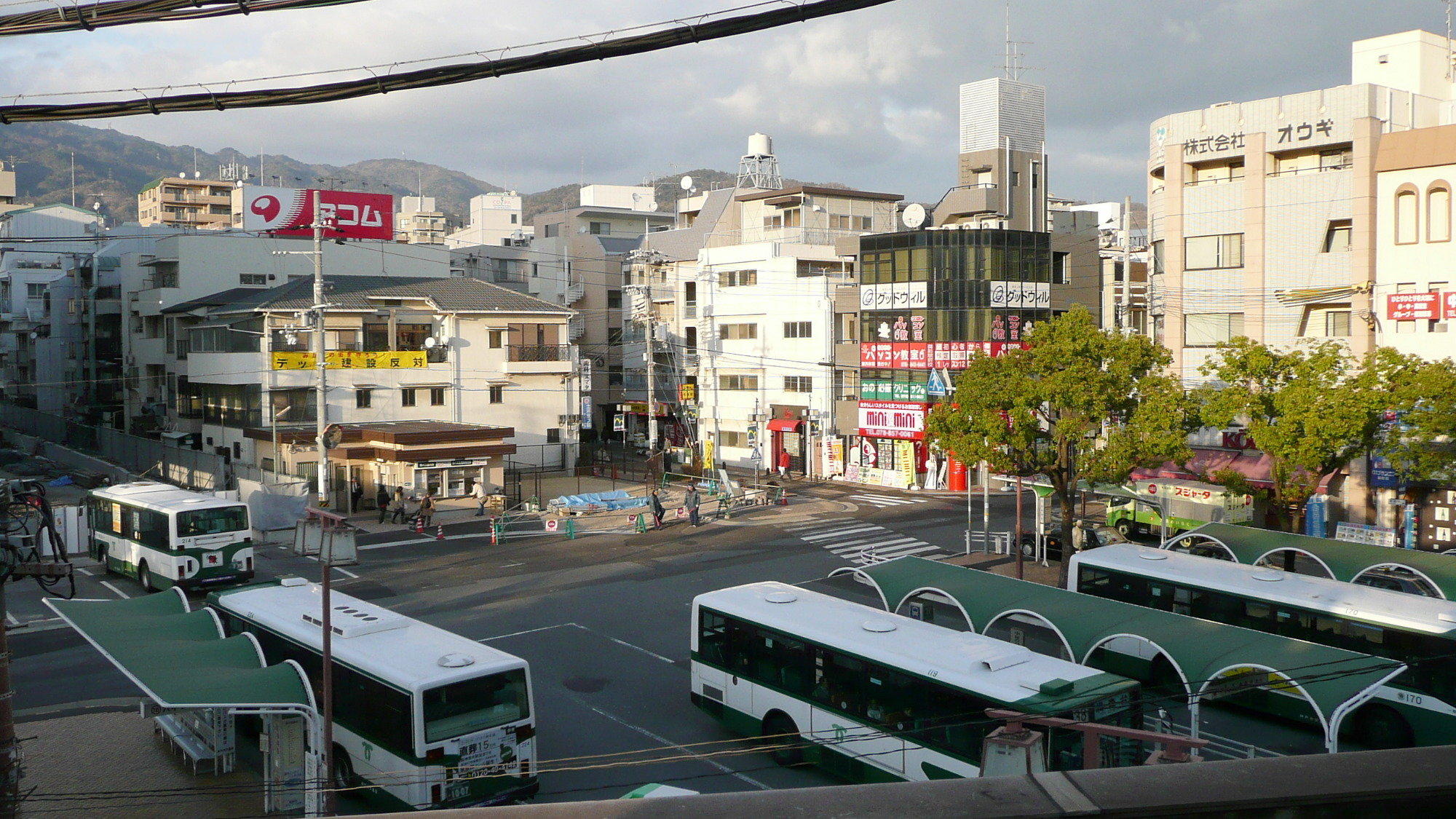
View of the bus terminal

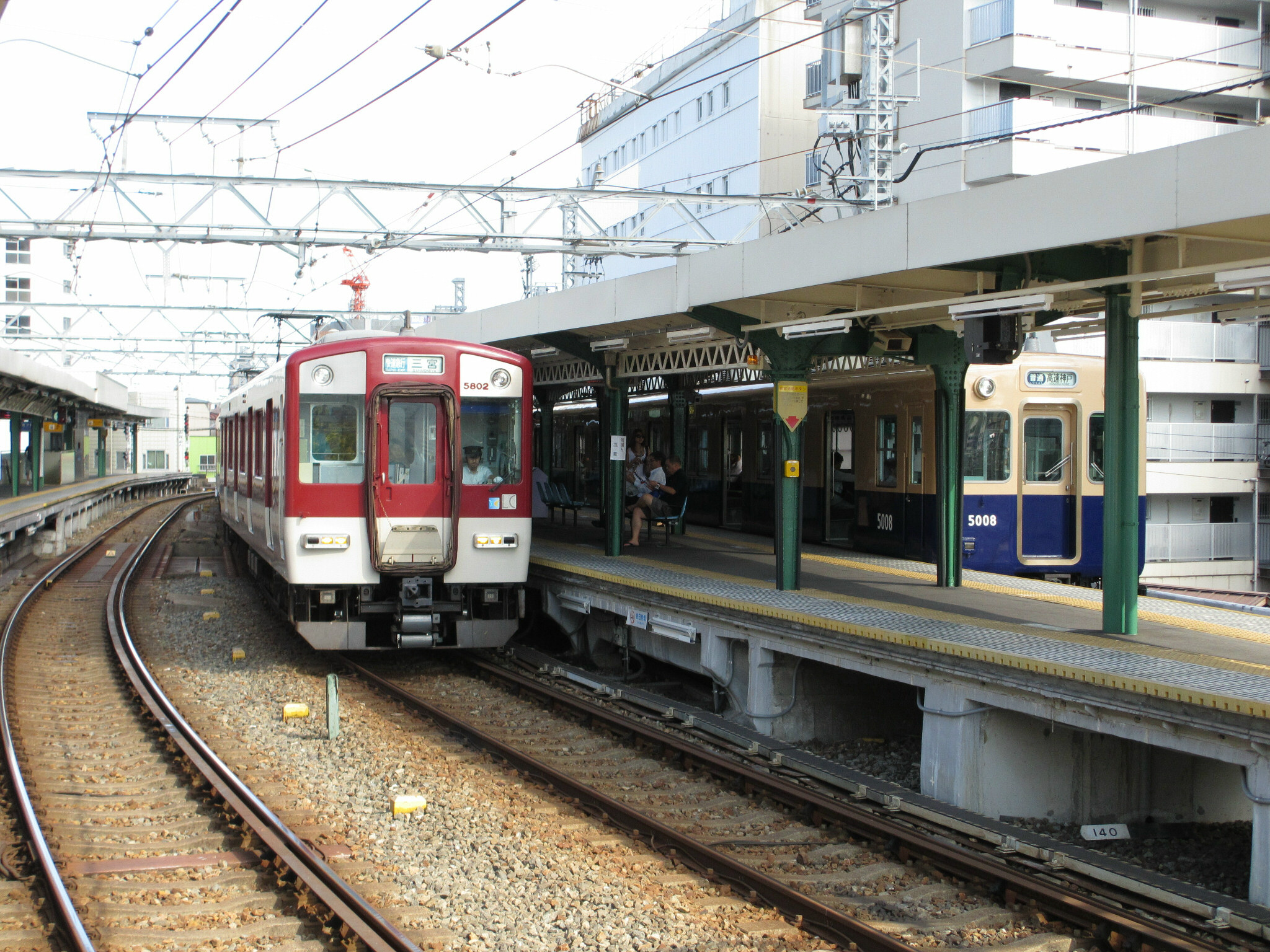
A westbound Kintetsu train on track 3

== History ==
Mikage Station opened on the Hanshin Main Line on 12 April 1905.

It was grade-separated and elevated along with the other stations on the line in July 1929.

Service was suspended owing to the Great Hanshin earthquake in January 1995. Restoration work on the Hanshin Main Line took 7 months to complete.

Station numbering was introduced on 21 December 2013, with Mikage being designated as station number HS-25.

== Passenger statistics ==
In fiscal 2020, the station was used by an average of 13,142 passengers daily

== Surrounding area ==
- Route 2 (国道2号) - Arterial route from Osaka to Fukuoka
- Mikage Classe (御影クラッセ) (Hankyu Oasis Mikage, Hanshin Mikage, etc.)
- Yuzuruha Shrine (15 minutes walk north, 弓弦羽神社)
- Higashinada Police Station (東灘警察署)
- Hyogo Prefectural Mikage High School (兵庫県立御影高等学校)
- Kobe Municipal Mikage Junior High School (神戸市立御影中学校)
- Kobe Municipal Mhkage Elementary School (神戸市立御影小学校)
- Morozoff Limited Kansai Branch (former headquarters)

=== Buses ===
- Departing from the north side
  - Route 16 for JR Rokkomichi (JR六甲道), Hankyu Rokko, Kobe University Faculty of Intercultural Studies (神大国際文化学部前), and Rokko Cable Car Station
  - Route 19 for Hankyu Mikage (阪急御影), Konan Hospital (甲南病院前), Kamokogahara (鴨子ヶ原) and Sumiyoshi Primary School attached to Kobe University (神大附属小学校前)
  - Route 36 for JR Rokkomichi (JR六甲道), Hankyu Rokko, Kobe University Main Gate and Tsurukabuto-danchi (鶴甲団地)
  - Route 38 for Higashinada Ward Office, Hakutsuru Fine Art Museum and Uzumoridai
  - Route 39 for JR Sumiyoshi, Hankyu Mikage, Konan Hospital, Kamokogahara and Sumiyoshi Primary School attached to Kobe University
- Departing from the south side
  - Route 33 for Higashinada Ward Office, Okamoto and JR Konan-Yamate
  - Route 35 for Higashinada Ward Office and Uozaki
  - Route 39 for JR Sumiyoshi, Hankyu Mikage, Konan Hospital, Kamokogahara and Sumiyoshi Primary School attached to Kobe University

==== Kobe Ferry Bus ====
- West side of Mikage Station, in front of Lawson Store 100
  - For Rokko Island Ferry Terminal and Rokko Passenger Ship Terminal

==== Kobe Minato Kanko ====
- West side of Mikage Station (northbound), in front of Morozoff Limited Kansai Branch
  - For Hankyu Mikage, Okamoto and Shukugawa Green Town (Hankyu Shukugawa)
- West side of Mikage Station (southbound), north of Edition appliance store Mikage
  - For Rokko Island

== See also ==
- List of railway stations in Japan
