= Ashiya Station (Hanshin) =

Railway station in Ashiya, Hyōgo Prefecture, Japan

Ashiya Station 芦屋駅
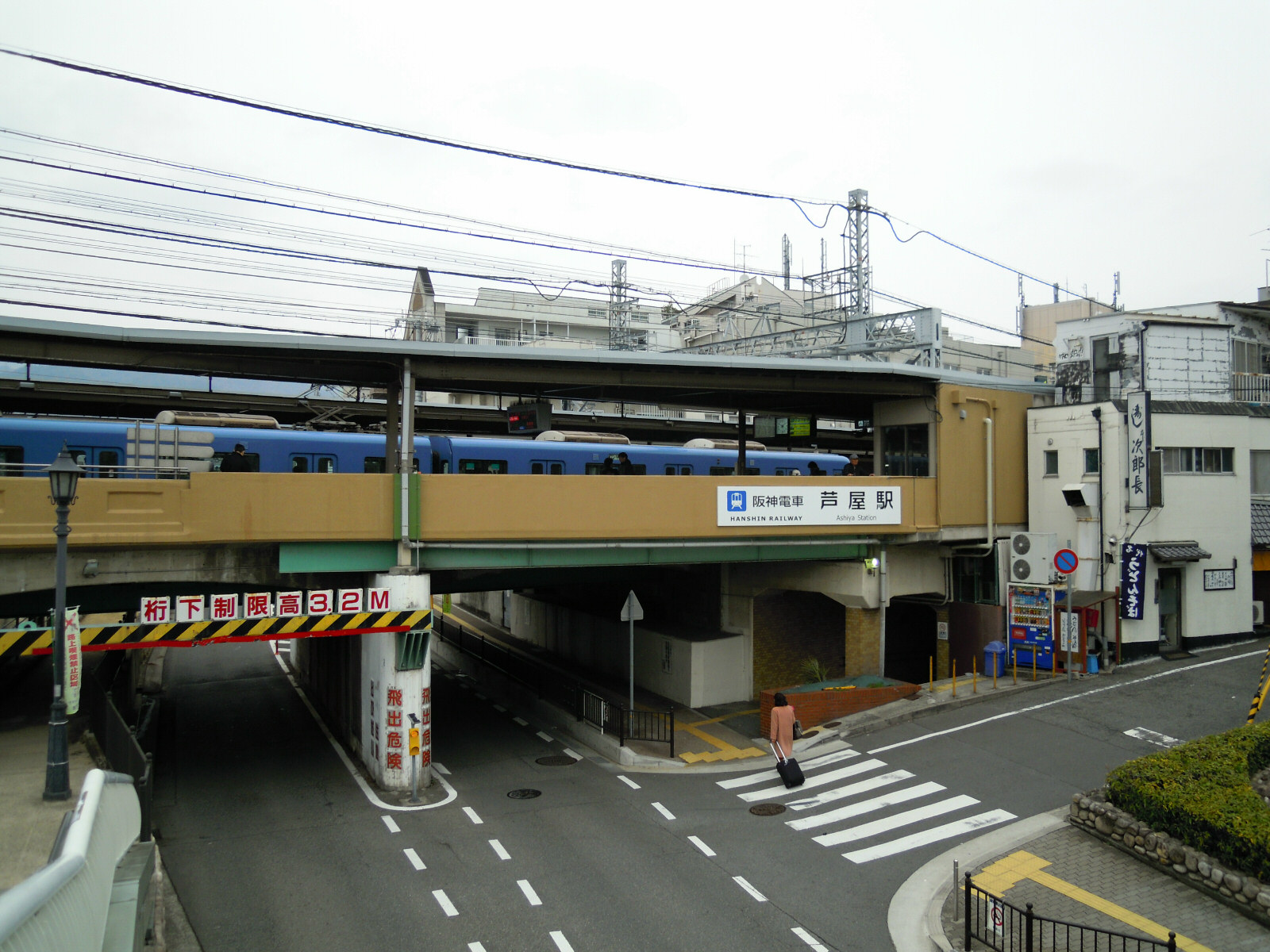
- Ashiya Station in May 2012

General information
- Location: Kimmitsu-chō, Ashiya-shi, Hyōgo-ken; Japan
- Coordinates: 34°43′41″N 135°18′15″E
- Operator: Hanshin Electric Railway
- Line: ■ Hanshin Main Line
- Distance: 20.20 km (12.55 miles) from Umeda
- Platforms: 2 side platforms
- Tracks: 2
- Connections: Bus terminal

Other information
- Station code: HS 20
- Website: Official website

History
- Opened: April 12, 1905

Passengers
- 2019: 25,170 (daily)

Services
Hanshin Main Line (HS 20)
Uchide (HS 19)	Local	Fukae (HS 21)
Nishinomiya (HS 17)	Express (1 Mikage-bound train only); Morning Express (Osaka-Umeda-bound trains only)	Ogi (HS 22)
Nishinomiya (HS 17)	Rapid Express (except weekends and holidays)	Uozaki(HS 23)
Uchide (HS 19)	Morning Limited Express (Osaka-Umeda-bound trains only)	Fukae (HS 21)
Nishinomiya (HS 17)	Limited Express; Direct Limited Express	Uozaki(HS 23)
Location
- Location within Hyōgo Prefecture Location within Japan

Ashiya Station (芦屋駅, Ashiya-eki) is a passenger railway station located in the city of Ashiya Hyōgo Prefecture, Japan. It is operated by the private transportation company Hanshin Electric Railway.

== Lines ==
Ashiya Station is served by the Hanshin Main Line, and is located 20.2 kilometers from the terminus of the line at Umeda.

== Layout ==
The station consists of two opposed ground-level side platforms connected by an underground passage. The ticket gates are located underground.

=== Platforms ===
1	■ ■■Main Line	for Koshien, Amagasaki, Osaka Umeda, Osaka Namba, and Nara
2	■ ■■Main Line	for Kobe-Sannomiya, Akashi, and Himeji

== Gallery ==
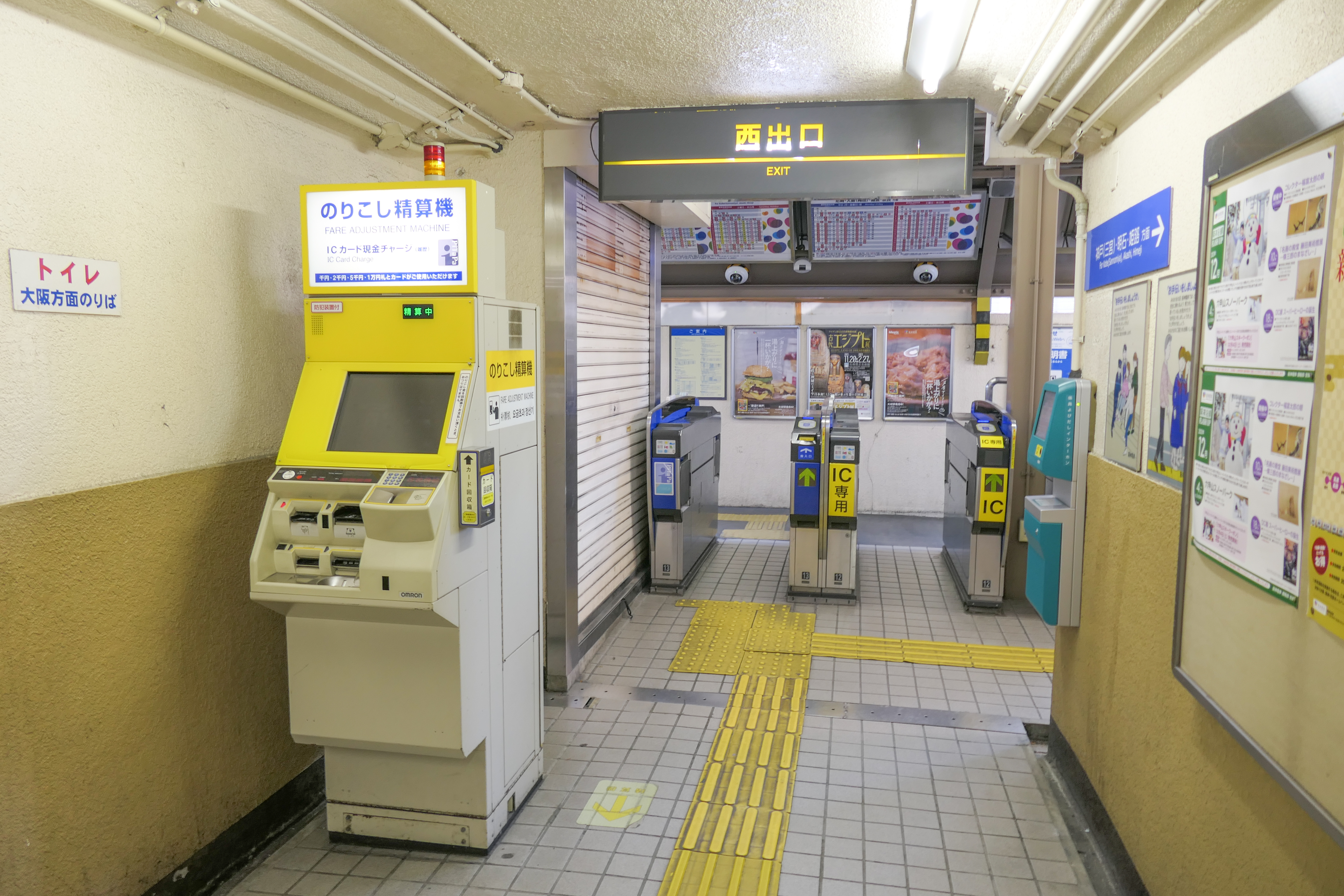
West ticket gate in 2021

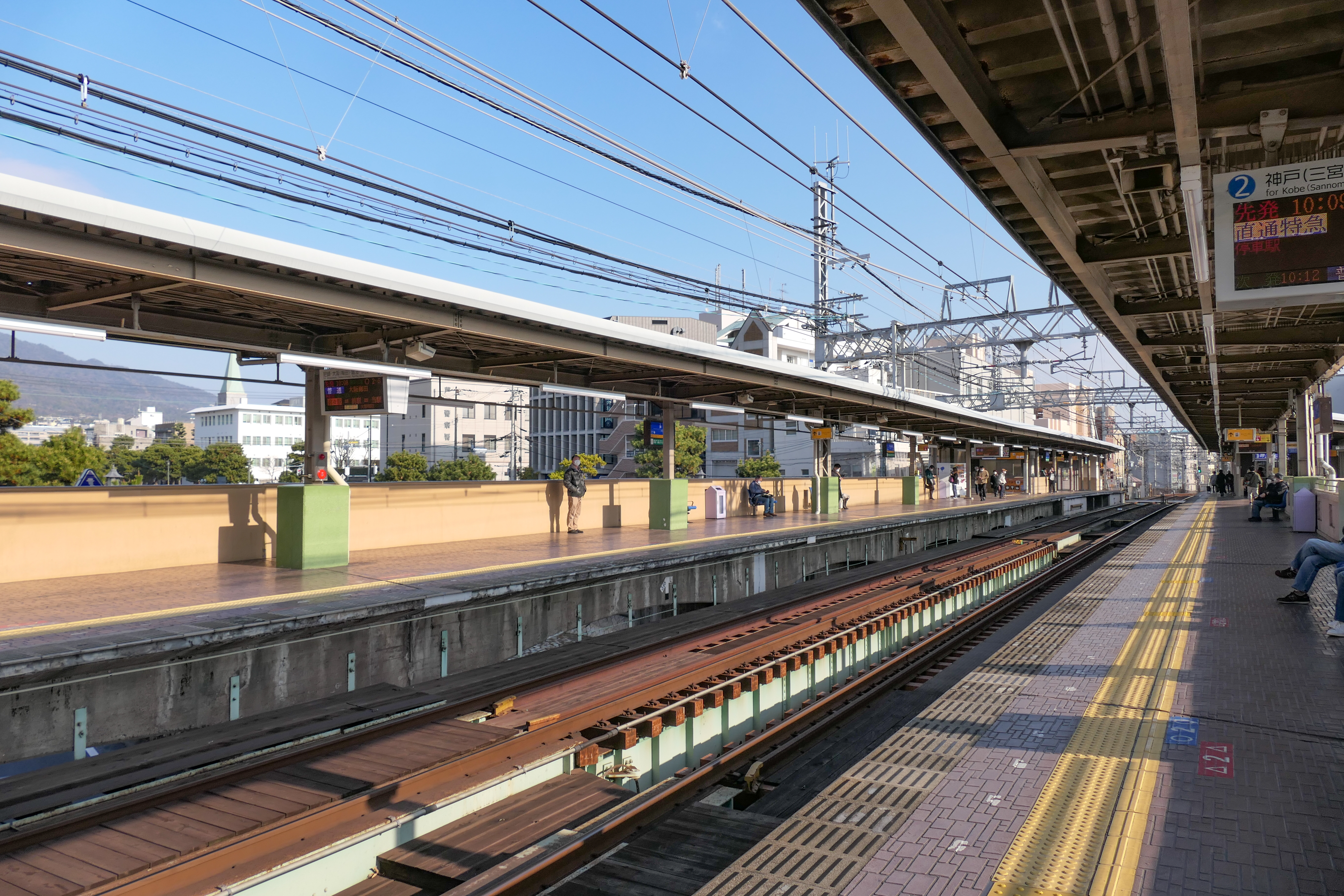
View of the platforms in December 2021

== History ==
Ashiya Station opened on 12 April 1905 along with the rest of the Hanshin Main Line.

On 17 January 1995, the station was damaged by the Great Hanshin earthquake. Service in the affected area was restored by 26 June 1995.

Station numbering was introduced on 21 December 2013, with Ashiya being designated as station number HS-20.

== Passenger statistics ==
In fiscal 2019, the station was used by an average of 29,542 passengers daily

== Surrounding area ==
- Ashiya City Hall
- Ashiya Civic Center
- Ashiya Park (5 minutes walk south, 芦屋公園)
- Ashiya Police Station (50m north, 芦屋警察署)

== See also ==
- List of railway stations in Japan
