= Higashinada-ku =

Coordinates: 34°43′13″N 135°15′56″E

Higashinada-ku 東灘区 ひがしなだく
- Ward
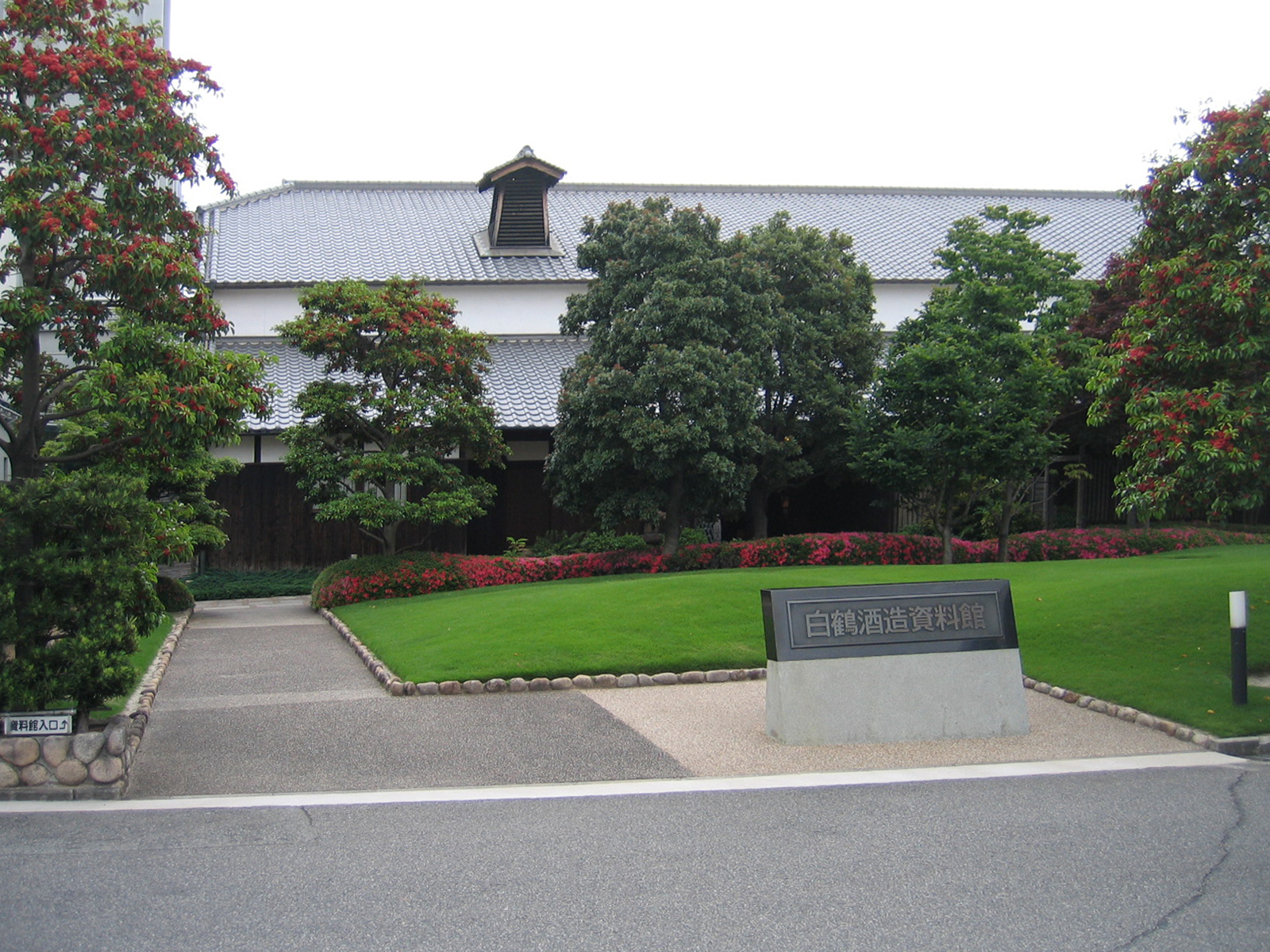
- Hakutsuru Sake Brewery Museum
- Interactive map of Higashinada-ku
- Country: Japan
- Region: Kansai
- Prefecture: Hyōgo
- City: Kobe

Area
  - Total: 34.03 km^{2} (13.14 sq mi)

Population
  - Estimate (2024): 210,534

Location of Higashinada-ku in Kobe

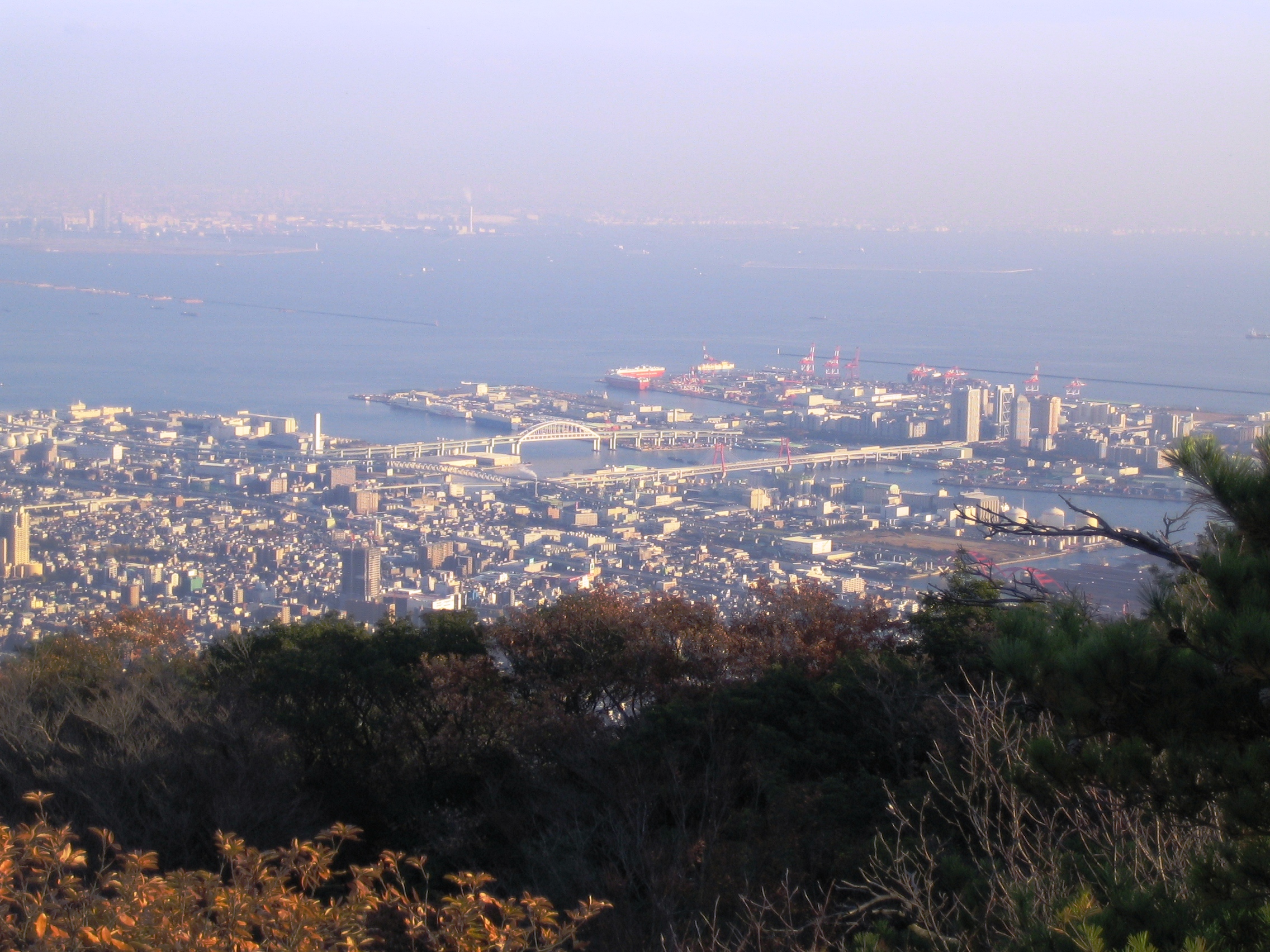
Rokkō Island Line and Rokkō Island from Mount Nagamine of Rokko Mountains

Higashinada (東灘区, Higashinada-ku) is one of 9 wards of Kobe, Japan. It has an area of 30.36 km^{2}. and a population of 212,111 (2012). South of the Hanshin Main Line, it is also home to some notable sake brewing areas, including Uozaki and Mikage.

== Transportation ==
=== Railways ===
- JR Kobe Line (Sumiyoshi - Settsu Motoyama - Konan-Yamate)
- Hankyu Kobe Line (Mikage - Okamoto)
- Hanshin Main Line (Ishiyagawa - Mikage - Sumiyoshi - Uozaki - Ōgi - Fukae)
- Rokko Liner

=== Roads ===
- Hanshin Expressway 3 - Kobe Route, 5 - Wangan Route
- Route 2, Route 43, Route 171

=== Sea ===
- Port of Kobe (Rokko Island)

== Education ==
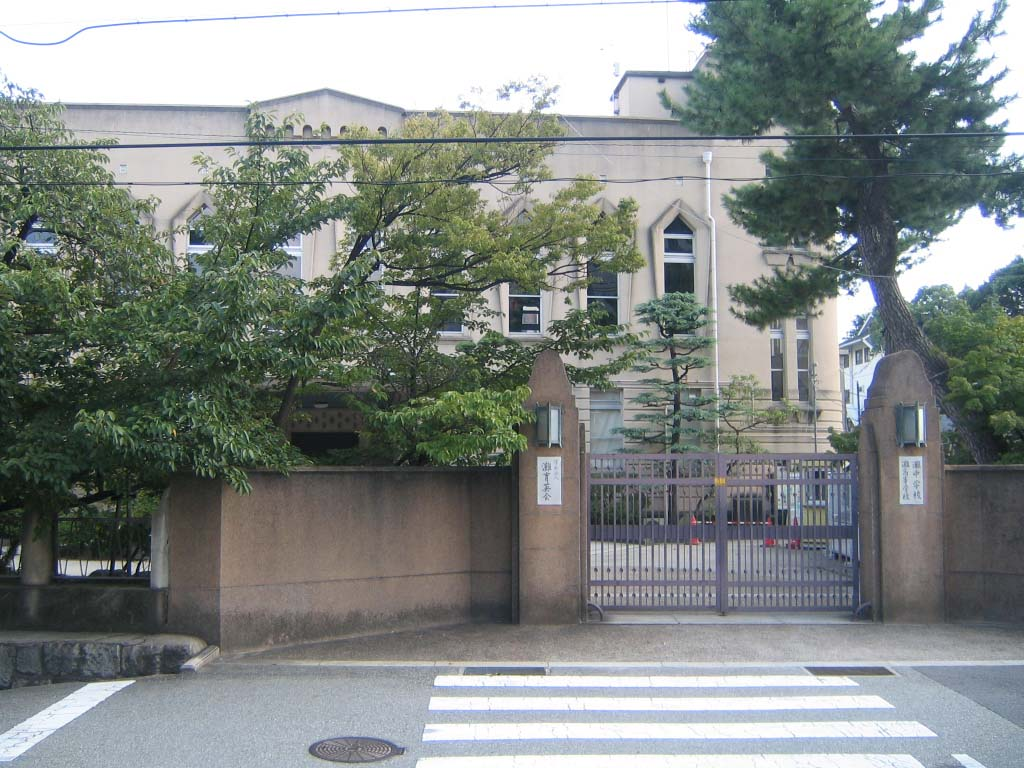
Nada High School, one of the top high schools in Japan

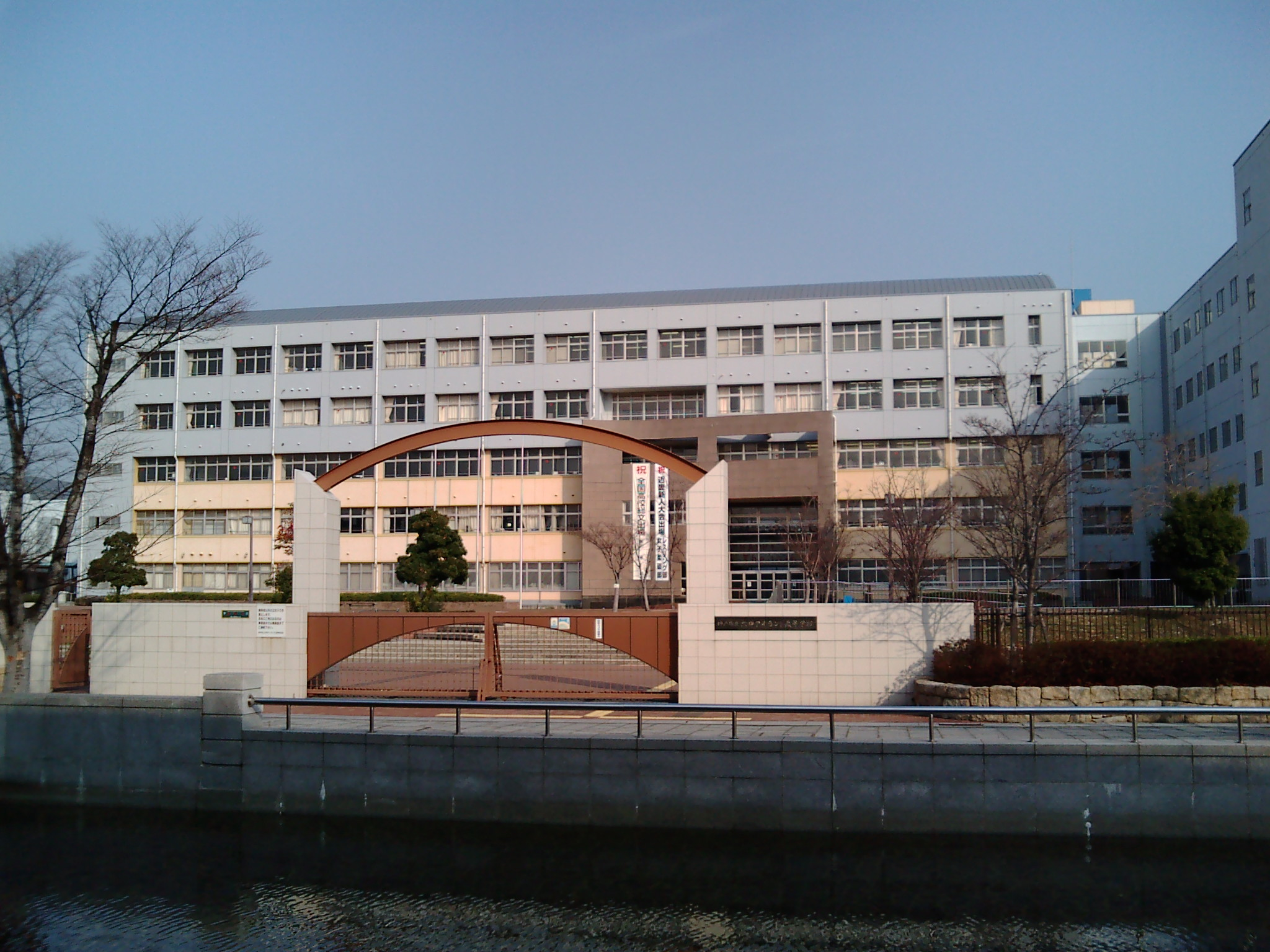
Rokko Island High School

Universities:

- Kobe International University on Rokko Island
- Konan University
- Konan Women's University

Public high schools:

- Rokko Island High School (神戸市立六甲アイランド高等学校) on Rokko Island

Private high school:

- Nada High School

International schools:

- Canadian Academy on Rokko Island
- Deutsche Schule Kobe on Rokko Island

Former schools:

- Norwegian School - Moved to Rokko Island in 1990, closed in 2005.
