= Hanshin Main Line =

Railway line in Osaka & Kobe, Japan

Main Line
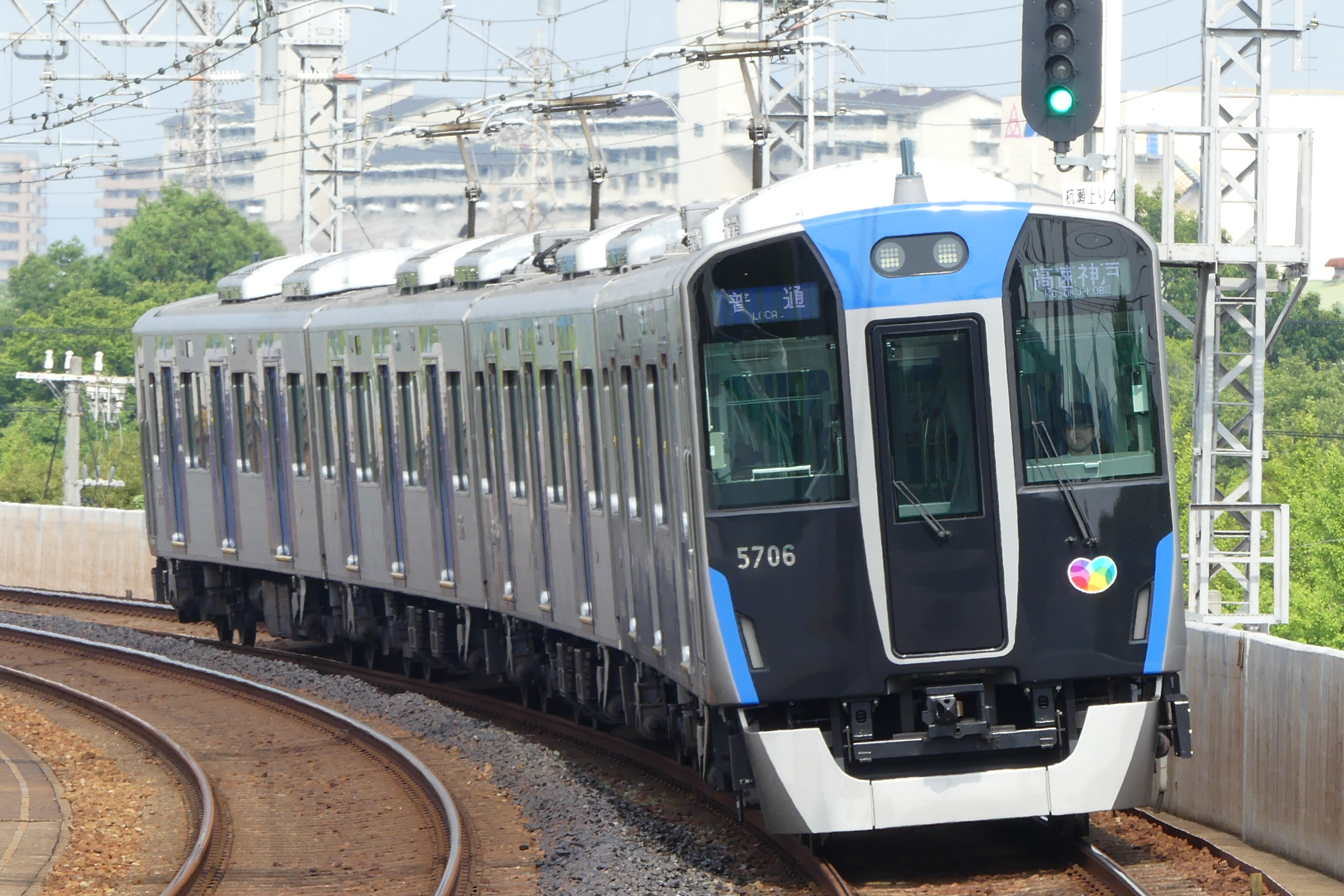
- Hanshin 5700 series EMU

Overview
- Native name: 阪神本線
- Locale: Osaka and Hyogo Prefectures
- Termini: Osaka-Umeda; Nishidai
- Stations: 39

Service
- Type: Commuter rail
- Operator: Hanshin Electric Railway Co., Ltd.
- Depot: Amagasaki

History
- Opened: April 12, 1905; 121 years ago

Technical
- Line length: 32.1 km (19.9 mi)
- Number of tracks: 2
- Track gauge: 1,435 mm (4 ft 8 1/2 in) standard gauge
- Electrification: 1,500 V DC, overhead lines
- Operating speed: 106 km/h (66 mph)

The Hanshin Main Line (阪神電気鉄道本線, Hanshin Denki Tetsudō Honsen) is a railway line operated by the private railway company Hanshin Electric Railway in Japan. It connects the two cities of Osaka and Kobe, between Umeda and Kobe-Sannomiya stations respectively.

== Outline ==
The Main Line of Hanshin is the southernmost railway to connect Osaka and Kobe. The other two lines, from south to north, are the West Japan Railway Company‘s Tōkaidō Main Line (known as the JR Kobe Line), and the Hankyu Railway's Kobe Main Line.

For nearly a century, the line served as a primary competitor to the Hankyū Kobe Line. However, in 2006, Hanshin and Hankyū were subsidiarized under a single share holding company, Hankyu Hanshin Holdings.

== History ==
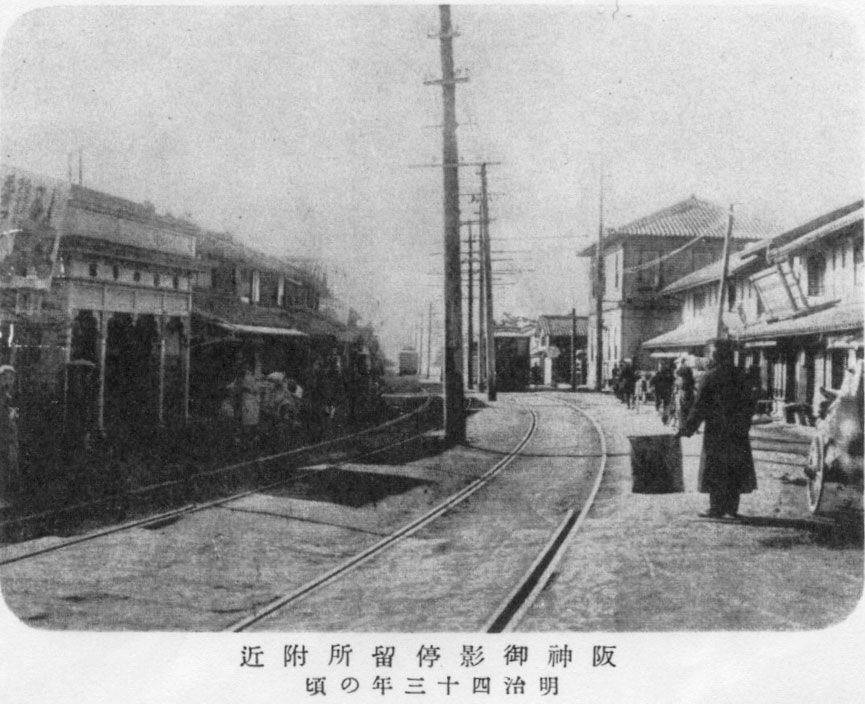
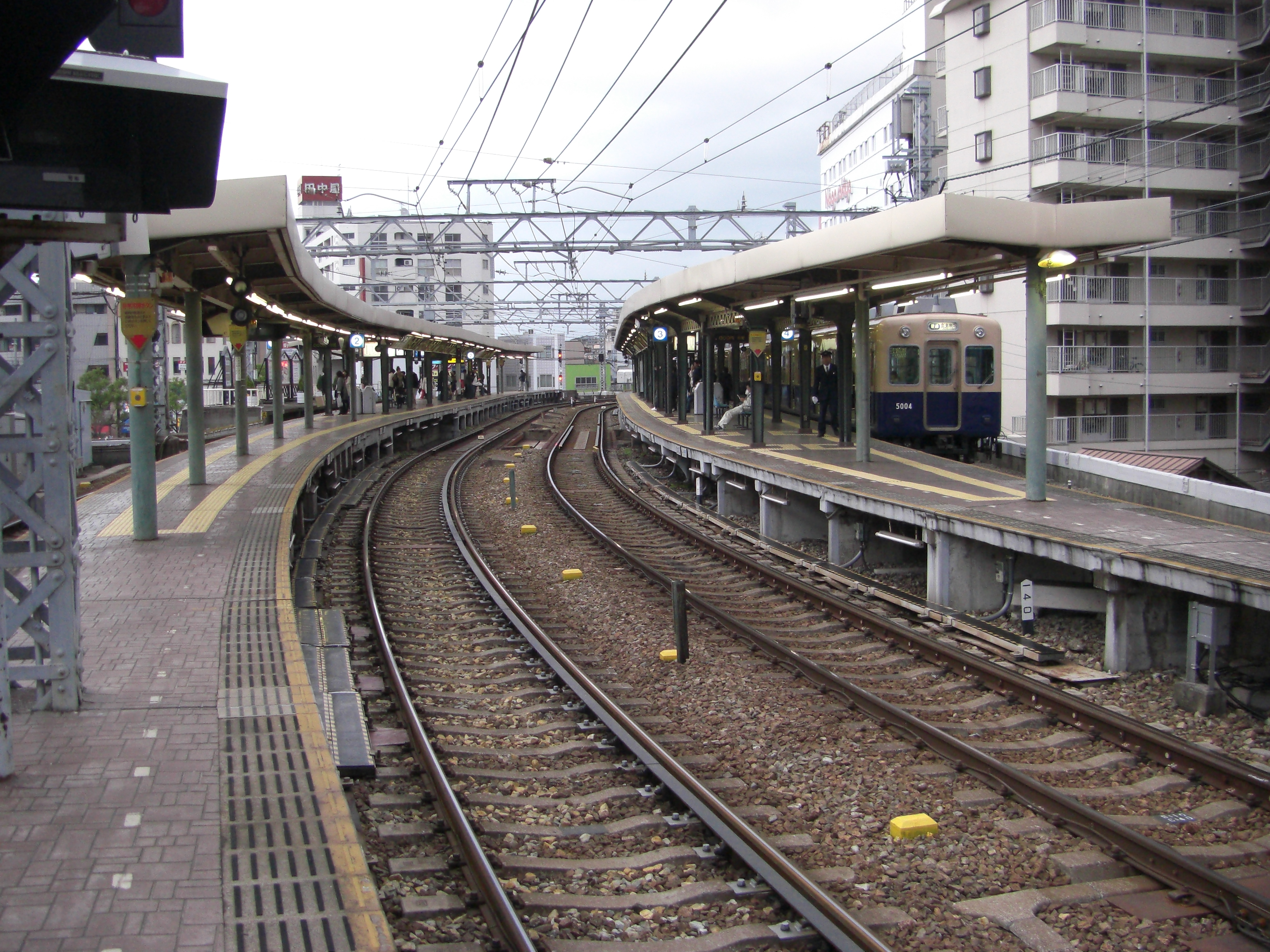
Mikage Station in 1910 (above) and today (below). Note the longer platforms and grade separation. These improvements were typical evolutions of early interurbans in Japan.

The Main Line started operation on April 12, 1905, by the company. The company found a solution to construct a competing line to the then JNR owned Kobe Line using a loophole in the Tram Act, allowing large portions of the line to be built using street running. It became the first interurban in Japan. This inspired other railways such as Keihan Electric Railway, Minoo Arima Electric Tramway (present Hankyu Hanshin Holdings, Inc.), Osaka Electric Tramway (present Kintetsu), Keihin Electric Railway (present Keihin Electric Express Railway) to build their first lines in a similar fashion.

Then another competing railway company, Hankyū (then Hanshin Kyuko Railway), opened the Kobe Main Line in 1920. The Kobe Main Line was designed as a faster electric mainline railway, and in response Hanshin began upgrading its interurban mainline to become more railway like. Operations included realigning and grade separating street running portions, using high platforms, and introducing express trains.

In 1968 Kobe Rapid Railway opened its Tōzai Line, and Hanshin began through operations to Sumaura-Kōen of Sanyo Electric Railway via Kobe Rapid (and Sanyo trains to Ōishi of Hanshin and Rokkō of Hankyū).

Through limited express trains to Sanyo Himeji were introduced in 2001. Then, the Hanshin Namba Line was extended to Namba, a major junction in southern Osaka. The company announced through trains from Kobe-Sannomiya to Kintetsu Nara in Nara on Kintetsu Nara Line would be operated.

=== Former connecting lines ===
- Deyashiki station - The Hanshin Amagasaki Kaigan Line operated between 1929 and 1962.

== Operation ==
Some trains run through the Sanyō Railway Main Line to Sanyō Himeji Station in Himeji, Hyōgo beyond Motomachi terminal via Kobe Rapid Railway.

The Main Line operates eight types of trains, one of the most types among Japanese railways. This is in some part to equalize the load of each train especially in the morning for Osaka (Umeda station) with short length of EMU length and with few (only double) tracks. For the extension of the Hanshin Namba Line, from Nishikujo to Osaka Namba, on March 20, 2009, the diagrams of the Hanshin Railway were revised.

Abbreviations are tentative for this article.
Local (普通, Futsū)
Trains stop all stations, farthest down to Shinkaichi in the rush hour, and Kosoku Kobe in the off-peak hour.
Express (急行, Kyūkō)
Trains are operated between Osaka-Umeda and Nishinomiya or between Osaka Umeda and Amagasaki. In addition, 1 midnight train is operated to Mikage with limited express stops.
Regional Express (区間急行, Kukan Kyūkō)
Trains are operated between Kōshien and Osaka-Umeda in weekday morning rush hours. In addition, 2 trains are operated from Ogi to Osaka-Umeda. In official route maps Hanshin shortens the name to "Express".
Rapid Express (快速急行, Kaisoku Kyūkō)
Trains are through trains to and from the Hanshin Namba Line and the Kintetsu Nara Line. They also stop at Mukogawa and Imazu Stations in the off-peak hour on weekdays, all day on weekends and holidays, but pass Ashiya Station on weekends and holidays. In addition to trains returning at Kobe-Sannomiya every day, there are also 3 trains from Shinkaichi on the Kobe Kosoku Line to Kintetsu Nara on weekends and Holidays.
Hanshin Limited Express (阪神特急, Hanshin Tokkyū)
Trains are operated down to Sumaura-kōen in the day and late night on weekdays and after day hours on holidays. In official route maps Hanshin shortens the name to "Limited Express".
Direct Limited Express (直通特急, Chokutsū Tokkyū)
Trains are operated between Osaka-Umeda and Sanyō Himeji. Trains marking in yellow in the destination sign stop at Nishi-Motomachi, Daikai and Nishidai Stations on the Kobe Kosoku Line. 7 eastbound trains pass Koshien in the morning on weekdays. In official route maps Hanshin shortens the name to "Limited Express".
Regional Limited Express (区間特急, Kukan Tokkyū)
Trains are operated only from Mikage to Osaka-Umeda in weekday morning rush hours with connections from Osaka-Umeda-bound local trains at Mikage. In official route maps Hanshin shortens the name to "Limited Express".

== Stations ==
The Main Line, having 39 stations (including the Kobe Kosoku Line), is noted for its "high density" of stations. In comparison, Kobe-Sannomiya Station is the 16th station on the Hankyū Kobe Main Line from Umeda Station and Motomachi Station is the 15th station on the JR Kobe Line from Osaka Station.

For connections and distances, see the route diagram.

- ● : All trains stop
- ▲ : Some trains stop, depending on time of day and the particular service
- ◆ : Served by weekend eastbound rapid express services only
- △ : Extra services stop
- ｜ ↓ ↑: All trains pass (Arrows indicate directions)

No.	Station	Japanese	Local	Regional Express	Express	Rapid Express	Regional Ltd. Exp.	Hanshin Ltd. Exp.	Direct Ltd. Exp.	Transfers	Location	
Hanshin Main Line
HS 01	Osaka-Umeda	大阪梅田	●	●	●		●	●	●	Hankyu Railway (HK-01:Osaka-umeda Station); Hankyū Kōbe Main Line; Hankyu Takarazuka Main Line; Hankyu Kyoto Main Line; Osaka Metro; Midosuji Line (M16: Umeda Station); Tanimachi Line (T20: Higashi-Umeda Station); Yotsubashi Line (Y11: Nishi-Umeda Station); JR West (Ōsaka Station); Tōkaidō Main Line; JR Kyoto Line (JR-A47); JR Kobe Line (JR-A47); JR Takarazuka Line (JR-G47); Osaka Higashi Line (JR-F01); Osaka Loop Line (JR-O11); JR Tōzai Line (JR-H44: Kitashinchi Station)	Kita-ku, Osaka	Osaka Prefecture
HS 02	Fukushima	福島	●	●	｜		↑	｜	｜	O Osaka Loop Line (JR-O12) H JR Tōzai Line (JR-H45: Shin-Fukushima Station)	Fukushima-ku, Osaka	Osaka Prefecture
HS 03	Noda	野田	●	●	●		●	｜	｜	H JR Tōzai Line (JR-H46: Ebie Station) Osaka Metro Sennichimae Line (S11: Noda-Hanshin Station)	Fukushima-ku, Osaka	Osaka Prefecture
HS 04	Yodogawa	淀川	●	｜	｜		↑	｜	｜		Fukushima-ku, Osaka	Osaka Prefecture
HS 05	Himejima	姫島	●	｜	△		↑	｜	｜		Nishiyodogawa-ku, Osaka	Osaka Prefecture
HS 06	Chibune	千船	●	●	｜		↑	｜	｜		Nishiyodogawa-ku, Osaka	Osaka Prefecture
HS 07	Kuise	杭瀬	●	｜	｜		↑	｜	｜		Amagasaki	Hyōgo Prefecture
Through service to Namba Line and A Kintetsu Nara Line:			From Amagasaki: Rapid Express to A Kintetsu Nara Line for Kintetsu Nara ※Note: Except the Rapid Express, all other through trains on the Namba Line terminate at Amagasaki, but not further west on the Hanshin Main Line									
HS 08	Daimotsu	大物	●	｜	｜	｜	↑	｜	｜	Hanshin Namba Line	Amagasaki	Hyōgo Prefecture
HS 09	Amagasaki	尼崎	●	●	●	●	●	●	●	Hanshin Namba Line	Amagasaki	Hyōgo Prefecture
HS 10	Deyashiki	出屋敷	●	｜	｜	｜	↑	｜	｜		Amagasaki	Hyōgo Prefecture
HS 11	Amagasaki Center Pool-mae	尼崎センタープール前	●	｜	｜	｜	↑	｜	｜		Amagasaki	Hyōgo Prefecture
HS 12	Mukogawa	武庫川	●	●	●	▲	↑	｜	｜	Hanshin Mukogawa Line	Amagasaki	Hyōgo Prefecture
HS 13	Naruo - Mukogawajoshidai-Mae	鳴尾・武庫川女子大前	●	●	｜	｜	↑	｜	｜		Nishinomiya	Hyōgo Prefecture
HS 14	Kōshien	甲子園	●	●	●	●	●	●	▲		Nishinomiya	Hyōgo Prefecture
HS 15	Kusugawa	久寿川	●	↑	｜	｜	↑	｜	｜		Nishinomiya	Hyōgo Prefecture
HS 16	Imazu	今津	●	●	●	▲	●	｜	｜	Hankyu Imazu Line	Nishinomiya	Hyōgo Prefecture
HS 17	Nishinomiya	西宮	●	●	●	●	↑	●	●		Nishinomiya	Hyōgo Prefecture
HS 18	Kōroen	香櫨園	●	↑	↓	｜	●	｜	｜		Nishinomiya	Hyōgo Prefecture
HS 19	Uchide	打出	●	↑	↓	｜	●	｜	｜		Ashiya	Hyōgo Prefecture
HS 20	Ashiya	芦屋	●	●	▲	▲	●	●	●		Ashiya	Hyōgo Prefecture
HS 21	Fukae	深江	●	↑	↓	｜	●	｜	｜		Higashinada-ku, Kobe	Hyōgo Prefecture
HS 22	Ōgi	青木	●	●	↓	｜	●	｜	｜		Higashinada-ku, Kobe	Hyōgo Prefecture
HS 23	Uozaki	魚崎	●		▲	●	●	●	●	Kobe New Transit Rokko Island Line (R02)	Higashinada-ku, Kobe	Hyōgo Prefecture
HS 24	Sumiyoshi	住吉	●		↓	｜	↑	｜	｜		Higashinada-ku, Kobe	Hyōgo Prefecture
HS 25	Mikage	御影	●		▲	｜	●	●	●		Higashinada-ku, Kobe	Hyōgo Prefecture
HS 26	Ishiyagawa	石屋川	●			｜		｜	｜		Higashinada-ku, Kobe	Hyōgo Prefecture
HS 27	Shinzaike	新在家	●			｜		｜	｜		Nada-ku, Kobe	Hyōgo Prefecture
HS 28	Ōishi	大石	●			｜		｜	｜		Nada-ku, Kobe	Hyōgo Prefecture
HS 29	Nishi-Nada	西灘	●			｜		｜	｜		Nada-ku, Kobe	Hyōgo Prefecture
HS 30	Iwaya (Hyogo Prefectural Museum of Art)	岩屋	●			｜		｜	｜		Nada-ku, Kobe	Hyōgo Prefecture
HS 31	Kasuganomichi	春日野道	●			｜		｜	｜		Chūō-ku, Kobe	Hyōgo Prefecture
HS 32	Kobe-Sannomiya	神戸三宮	●			●		●	●	Hankyu Kobe Line Kobe Kosoku Line Kobe New Transit Port Island Line (P01) Kobe Municipal Subway Seishin-Yamate Line (S03) Kobe Municipal Subway Kaigan Line (K01: Sannomiya-Hanadokeimae Station) JR Kobe Line (JR-A61: Sannomiya Station)	Chūō-ku, Kobe	Hyōgo Prefecture
HS 33	Motomachi	元町	●					●	|	JR Kobe Line (JR-A62)	Chūō-ku, Kobe	Hyōgo Prefecture
Kobe Kosoku Line
HS 34	Nishi-Motomachi	西元町	●					●	|		Chūō-ku, Kobe	Hyōgo Prefecture
HS 35	Kōsoku Kobe	高速神戸	●					●	●	JR Kobe Line (JR-A63: Kobe Station) Kobe Municipal Subway Kaigan Line (K04: Harborland Station)	Chūō-ku, Kobe	Hyōgo Prefecture
HS 36	Shinkaichi	新開地	▲					●	●	Kobe Electric Railway Kobe Kosoku Line	Hyōgo-ku, Kobe	Hyōgo Prefecture
HS 37	Daikai	大開						●	|		Hyōgo-ku, Kobe	Hyōgo Prefecture
HS 38	Kōsoku Nagata	高速長田						●	●	Kobe Municipal Subway Seishin-Yamate Line (S08: Nagata Station)	Nagata-ku, Kobe	Hyōgo Prefecture
HS 39 SY 01	Nishidai	西代						●	|	Sanyo Railway Main Line (through service)	Nagata-ku, Kobe	Hyōgo Prefecture
Through services to Sanyo Electric Railway Main Line:			From Nishidai: Hanshin Limited Express for Sumaura-koen Direct Limited Express for Sanyo-Himeji									
