= Sumiyoshi Station (Hanshin) =

Railway station in Kobe, Japan

Sumiyoshi Station 住吉駅
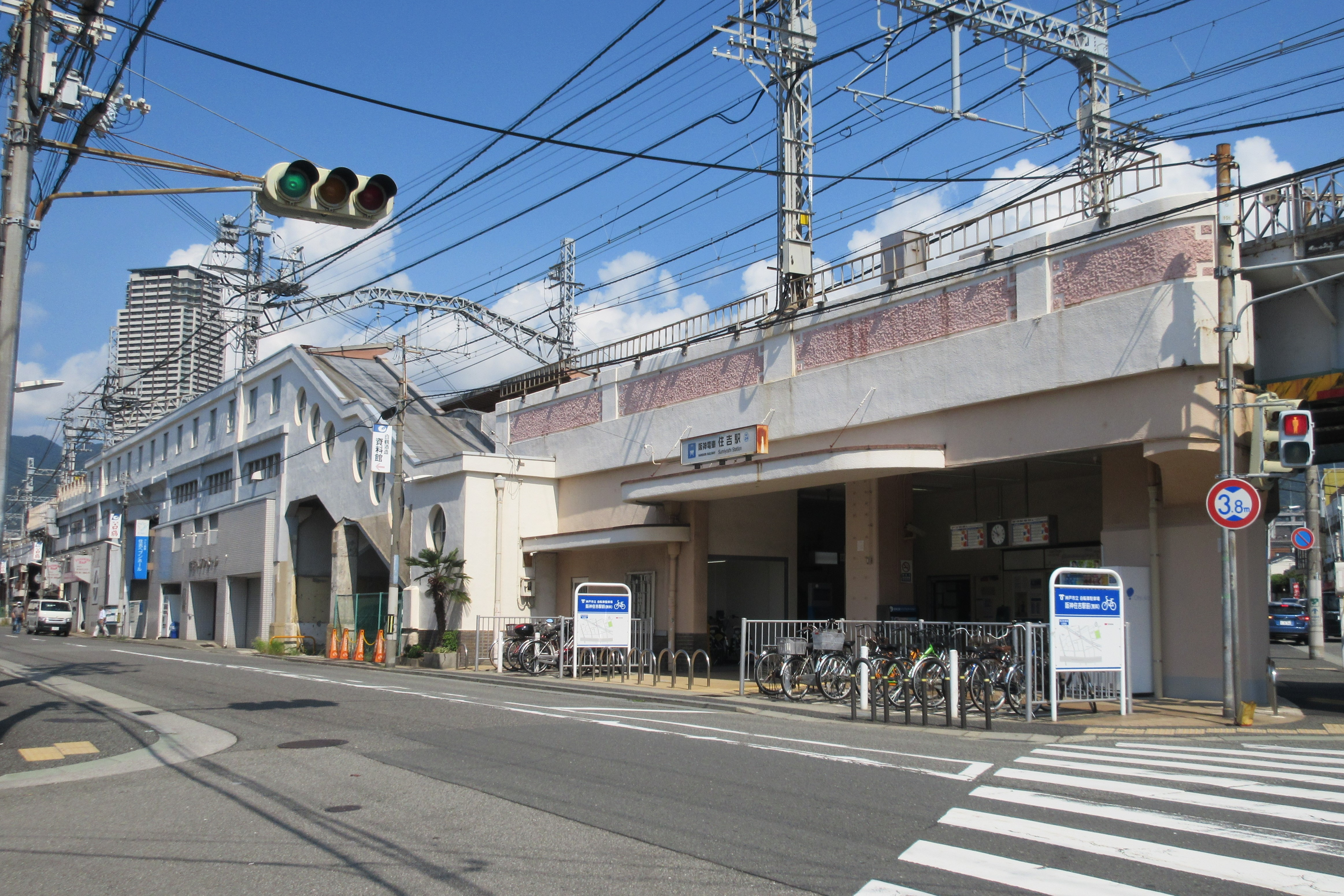
- Sumiyoshi Station

General information
- Location: 5-chōme-1 Sumiyoshimiyamachi, Higashinada-ku, Kobe-shi, Hyōgo-ken 658-0053; Japan
- Coordinates: 34°42′47″N 135°15′42″E
- Operator: Hanshin Electric Railway
- Line: ■ Hanshin Main Line
- Distance: 24.6 km (15.3 miles) from Umeda
- Platforms: 2 side platforms

Other information
- Station code: HS 24
- Website: Official website

History
- Opened: April 12, 1905

Passengers
- FY2019: 1,489

Services
Hanshin Main Line (HS 24)
| Uozaki (HS 23) | Local | Mikage (HS 25) |
Express (1 Mikage-bound train only on weekdays): Does not stop at this station
Rapid Express: Does not stop at this station
Morning Limited Express (Osaka-Umeda-bound train only on weekdays): Does not stop at this station
Limited Express: Does not stop at this station
Direct Limited Express: Does not stop at this station
Location
- Location within Hyōgo Prefecture Location within Japan

Sumiyoshi Station (住吉駅, Sumiyoshi-eki; station number: HS-24) is a passenger railway station located in Higashinada-ku, Kobe, Hyōgo Prefecture, Japan. It is operated by the private transportation company Hanshin Electric Railway.

== Lines ==
Sumiyoshi Station is served by the Hanshin Main Line, and is located 24.6 kilometers from the terminus of the line at Umeda. Only local trains stop at the station.

== Layout ==
The station consists of two elevated opposed side platforms serving two tracks. There is only one ticket gate on the ground level.

=== Platforms ===
| 1 | ■ Main Line | for Koshien, Amagasaki, Osaka (Umeda), Namba, and Nara |
| 2 | ■ Main Line | for Sannomiya, Kosoku Kobe, Akashi, and Himeji |

== Gallery ==
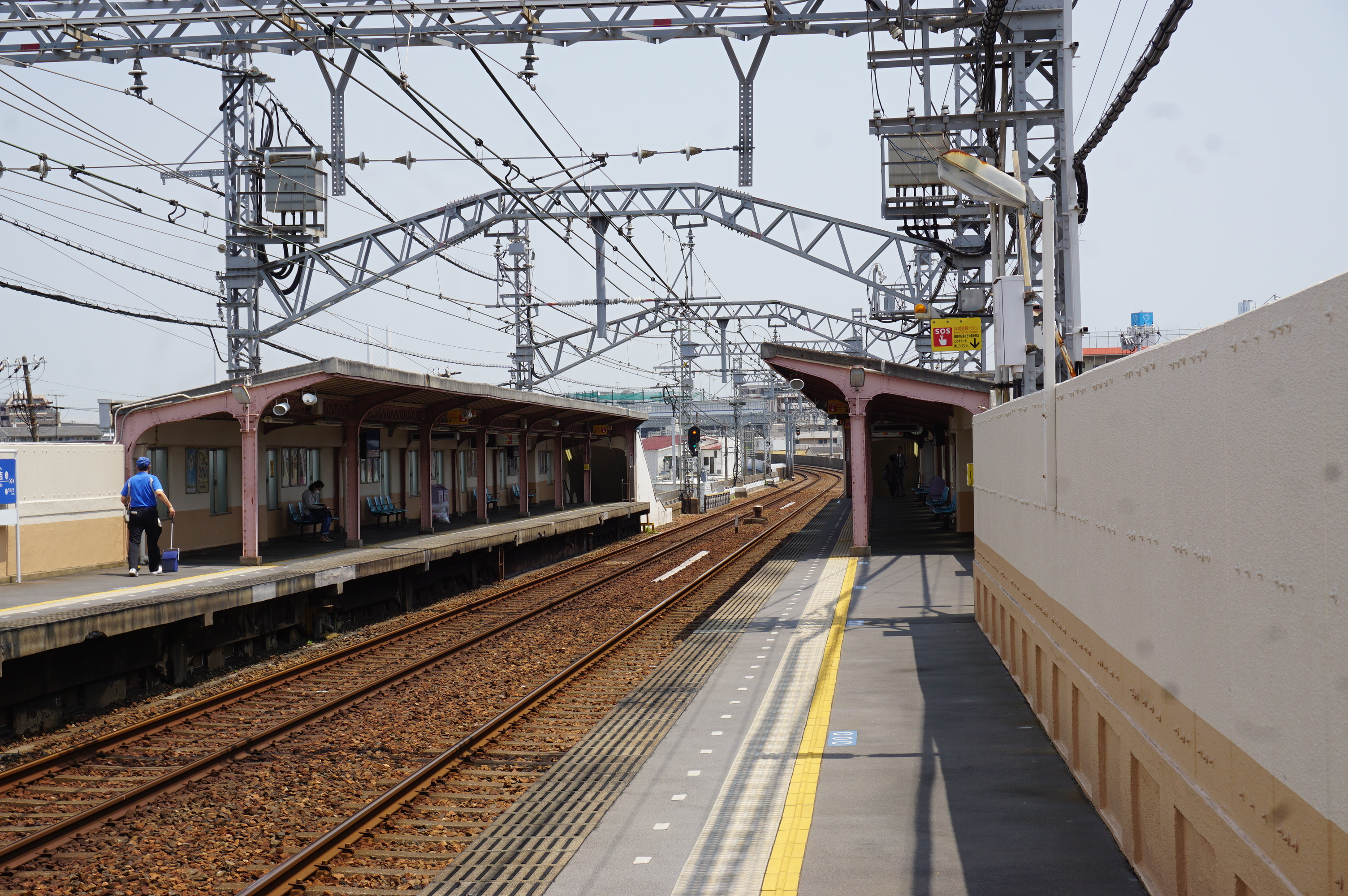
The elevated Hanshin Main Line platforms

== History ==
Sumiyoshi Station opened on April 12, 1905 along with the rest of the Hanshin Main Line.

It was upgraded to an elevated station in 1929.

On January 17, 1995, the station was damaged by the Great Hanshin earthquake. Service in the affected area was restored by June 26, 1995.

== Passenger statistics ==
In fiscal 2019, the station was used by an average of 1,489 passengers daily

== Surrounding area ==
- Sumiyoshi Park
- Hakutsuru Sake Factory and Museum
- Higashi Otomezuka Park
- Kikumasa Sake Brewery
- JR Sumiyoshi Station (approx 1 km)

== See also ==
- List of railway stations in Japan
