= Nishinomiya Station =

Nishinomiya Station (西宮駅) refers to two railway stations in Nishinomiya, Hyōgo, Japan:

- Nishinomiya Station (JR West)
- Nishinomiya Station (Hanshin)
