= Sakura Shukugawa Station =

Railway station in Nishinomiya, Hyōgo Prefecture, Japan

Sakura Shukugawa Station さくら夙川駅
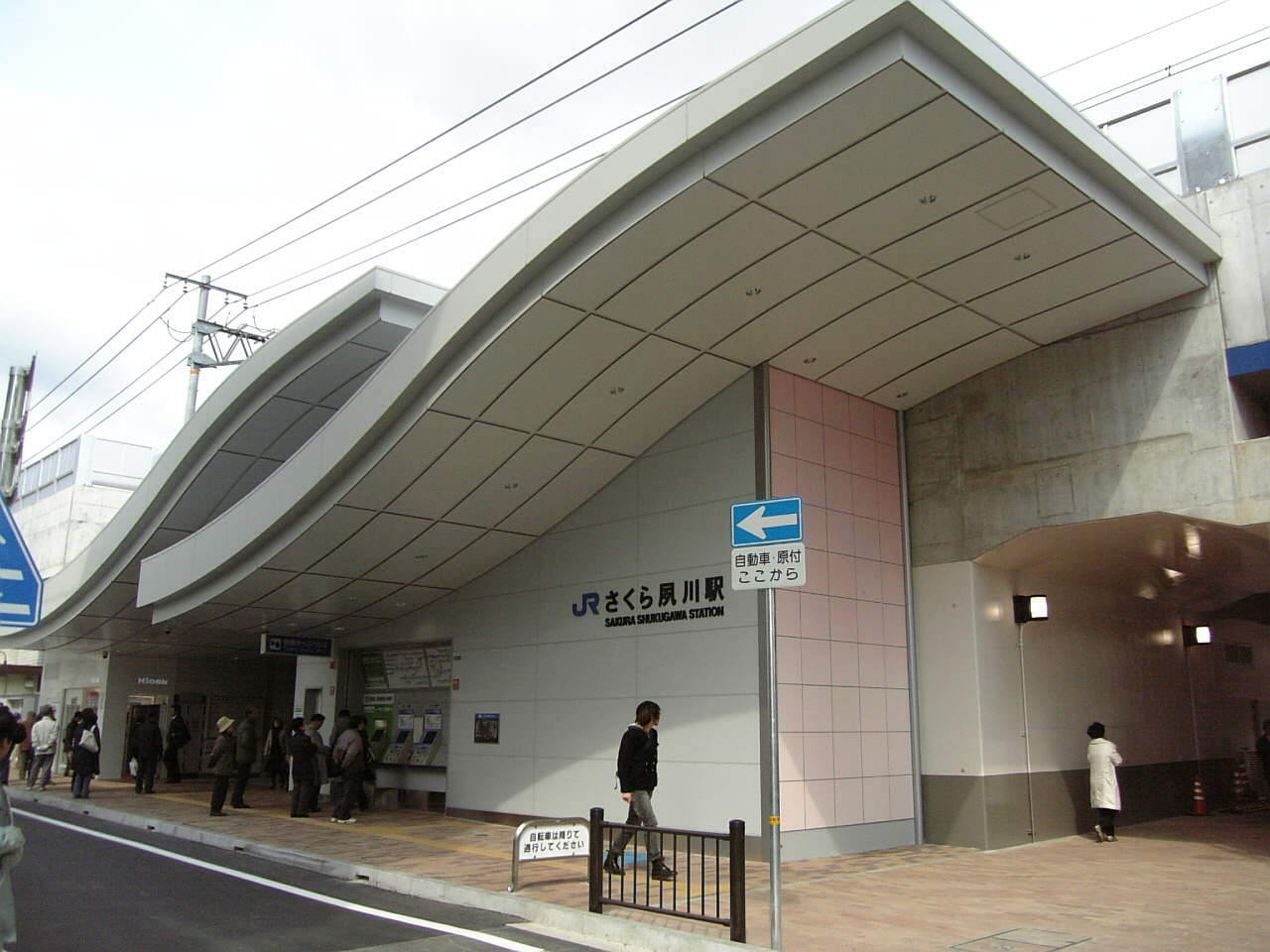
- Sakura Shukugawa Station

General information
- Location: 11 Kagurachō, Nishinomiya,-shi, Hyōgo-ken 662-0977; Japan
- Coordinates: 34°44′20.36″N 135°19′51.76″E
- Owner: West Japan Railway Company
- Operator: West Japan Railway Company
- Line: Tōkaidō Main Line (JR Kōbe Line)
- Distance: 573.3 km (356.2 miles) from Tokyo
- Platforms: 1 island platform
- Connections: Bus stop

Construction
- Structure type: Elevated
- Accessible: Yes

Other information
- Status: Staffed (Midori no Madoguchi)
- Station code: JR-A53
- Website: Official website

History
- Opened: 18 March 2007

Passengers
- FY 2023: 15,770 daily
Location
- Location within Hyōgo Prefecture Location within Japan

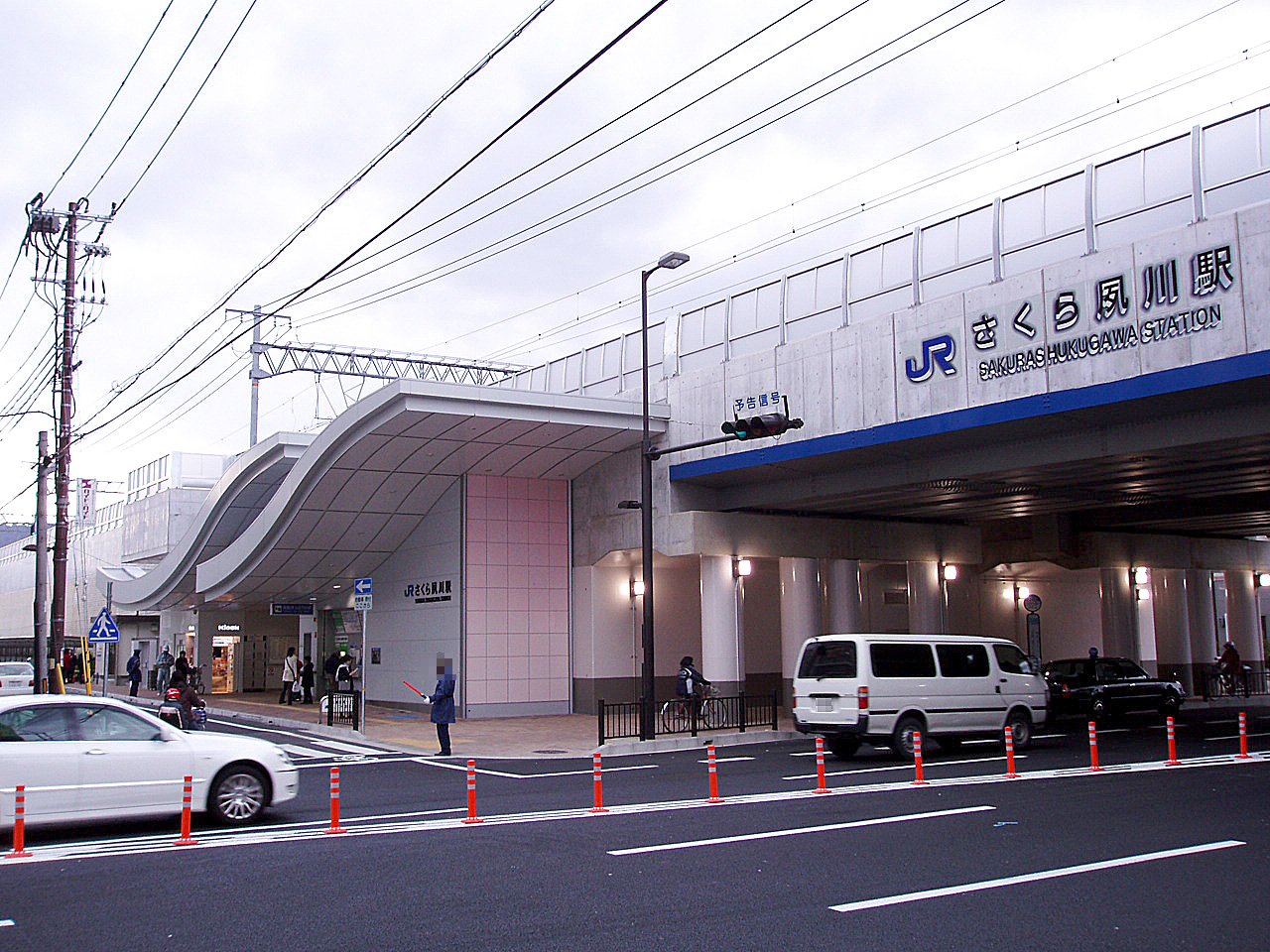
Sakura Shukugawa Station

Sakura Shukugawa Station (さくら夙川駅, Sakura Shukugawa-eki) is a passenger railway station located in the city of Nishinomiya, Hyōgo Prefecture, and is operated by the West Japan Railway Company. The station's name comes from the park approximately 200 meters west of the station, Shukugawa Park. The park is situated on the banks of the Shukugawa riverbed and is famous for its annual display of cherry blossoms, and is a popular site for hanami flower viewing parties.

== Lines ==
Sakura Shukugawa Station is served by the Tōkaidō Main Line (JR Kobe Line), and is located 573.3 kilometers from the terminus of the line at Tokyo and 16.9 kilometers from Osaka.

== Station layout and design ==
=== Station placement ===
Most of the JR Kobe Line runs on four tracks (複々線, Fukufukusen), meaning that there are two tracks for each direction. Similar to other stations such as Kōnan-Yamate Station, Sakura Shukugawa Station is of the island platform type, that is situated between the four tracks. Specifically, it is between the two inner tracks that provide local service. Local trains stop at this station. Rapid Service trains pass the station on the same track, but do not stop. Special Rapid Service and other Limited Express trains pass by on the outer track.

=== Building design ===
With regard to the design of the station building, the basic concept was to give the station a natural warmth and vibrance. The roof line is a conceptual representation of waves flowing down the Shukugawa River, and the walls are the color of cherry blossoms.

Hyōgo Prefecture Highway 82 passes underneath the platform and tracks.

=== Gates ===
The station has only one gate, located on the south side of the station. The station accepts ICOCA cards.

=== Train Platforms ===
1	■ JR Kobe Line	for Sannomiya and Himeji
2	■ JR Kobe Line	for Amagasaki, Osaka and Kitashinchi

== Adjacent stations ==
«	Service	»
JR West Tōkaidō Line (JR Kobe Line)
Nishinomiya (JR-A52)	Local	Ashiya (JR-A54)
Rapid Service: Does not stop at this station
Special Rapid Service: Does not stop at this station

== History ==
Generally, the local government encourages people to petition for a new station to be built, however, the widening of Prefecture Road 82 was already underway and funded by the federal government. Therefore, Nishinomiya didn't have the burden of petitioning for the station, but rather JR West went to the government and began design the plans. Prefecture Road 82, directly below the station, had already been undergoing construction to widen the road, so when the construction of the station began, both construction sites were operating at the same time, one on top of the other.

In preparation of JR Sakura Shukugawa Station's opening, on 28 October 2006, both Hankyū Railway and Hanshin Electric Railway altered their schedules and changed which trains would stop at the stations that are direct competitors of JR Sakura Shukugawa Station. At Hankyū Shukugawa Station, where before only local service stopped, now Limited Express and Commuter Express would stop. At Hanshin Kōroen Station, Limited Express trains began stopping in the morning. These changes were made, it is thought, to go head-to-head with the new JR Sakura Shukugawa Station.

Before the station opened to the public, there was no practice for stopping the train at the station in an actual train. Training was presented in a classroom. The train operator labor union severely opposed this. In response, it was decided that for any operator stopping at Sakura Shukugawa Station for the first time would be accompanied by an instructor.

=== Station timeline ===
- 2001 - Construction began. Tentative station name: JR Shukugawa (JR夙川駅).
- 22 November 2006 - Official station name announced: Sakura Shukugawa (さくら夙川駅).
- 18 March 2007 - Station opens to the public and passenger service begins.
- March 2018 - Station numbering was introduced with Sakura Shukugawa being assigned station number JR-A53.

== Passenger statistics ==
In fiscal 2019, the station was used by an average of 8,373 passengers daily

== Surrounding area ==
- Shukugawa River (west of the station)
- Shukugawa Park (west of the station)
- Hankyū Kōbe Line - Shukugawa Station (to he northwest)
- Hanshin Main Line - Nishinomiya Station (to the southeast) and Kōroen Station (to the southwest)
- Route 2
- Nishinomiya Jinja (south of the station)

== See also ==
- List of railway stations in Japan
