= Hanica =

IC card on Kansai region bus systems in Japan

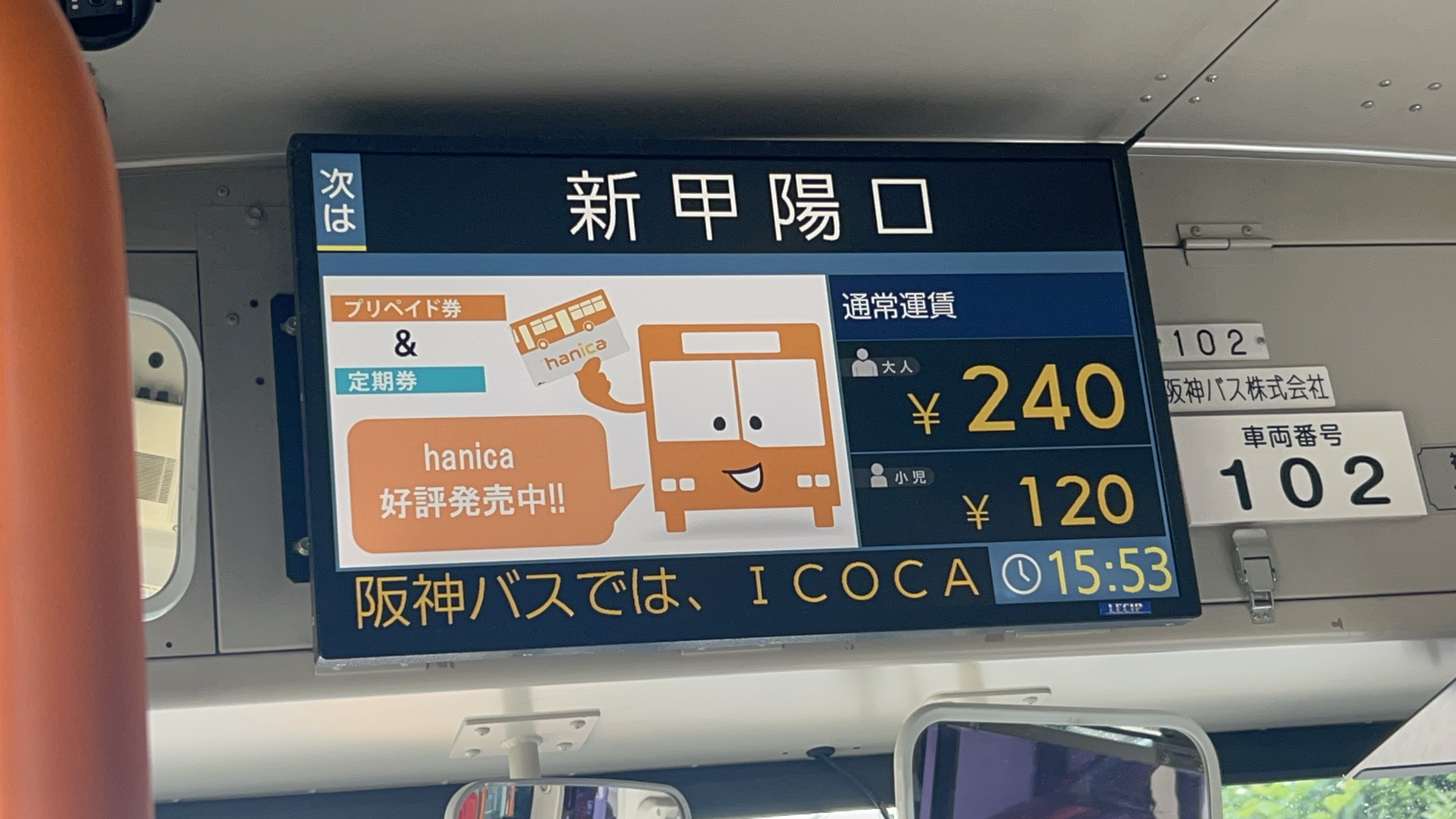
Hanshin Bus hanica Guide

Hanica (stylized in lowercase as hanica) is an IC card used exclusively by Hankyu Bus and Hanshin Bus in the Kansai region in Japan.

== History ==
The Hanica card was announced in February 2012 as a replacement for an older transit card called the "Surutto Kansai Card", and was designed to be interoperable on the Hanshin Bus, Hankyu Bus, and Hankyu Denen Bus systems. The card was formally introduced in April 2012. It is a pre-paid IC card system, and 2,000 yen, 3,000 yen, 5,000 yen, and 10,000 yen amounts can be stored on the card.

In May 2014, Hanshin Bus announced that it would begin issuing commuter passes via the Hanica card system. This change was implemented by June 2014, with sales of older commuter passes being discontinued.

In February 2016, Hanica IC cards became able to be used interchangeably as commuter passes on Sakura Yamanami Bus, Hankyu Bus, and Hanshin Bus routes serving Nishinomiya in Hyōgo Prefecture, regardless of the issuing company. This was intended to improve convenience for riders by making it no longer necessary to purchase separate commuter passes from each company. Discounted fares were implemented for elementary school students, as well as the general public on weekends only.

On March 20, 2016, the Amagasaki Transportation Organization and the Amagasaki Transportation Service Corporation closed. Bus routes were transferred to Hanshin Bus.

In July 2017, Hankyu Bus introduced a limited edition set of themed Hanica cards in celebration of the company's 90th anniversary.

In 2023, Hanshin Bus announced plans to raise fares for the first time since 1997, with premium rates for the Hanica card remaining unchanged. The fares were raised gradually throughout 2024 and 2025.

== Availability ==
Hanica is available to use on Hanshin Bus and Hankyu Bus. It is not usable on the Hanshin Electric Railway, Hankyu Electric Railway, or JR West lines, and it cannot be used on airport buses, express buses, night buses, or tour buses.

== Charging locations ==
Several stations are available to recharge Hanica cards:

- Amagasaki Sales Office
- Nishinomiyahama Sales Office
- Hanshin Bus Service Center
- Koshien Information Center
- Tsukaguchi Sales Office
- Muko Sales Office
- Inside Hanshin Bus
- Osaka Umeda Station
- Nishinomiya Station
- Kobe Sannomiya Station
