= Kōshien Station =

Railway station in Nishinomiya, Hyōgo Prefecture, Japan

Kōshien Station 甲子園駅
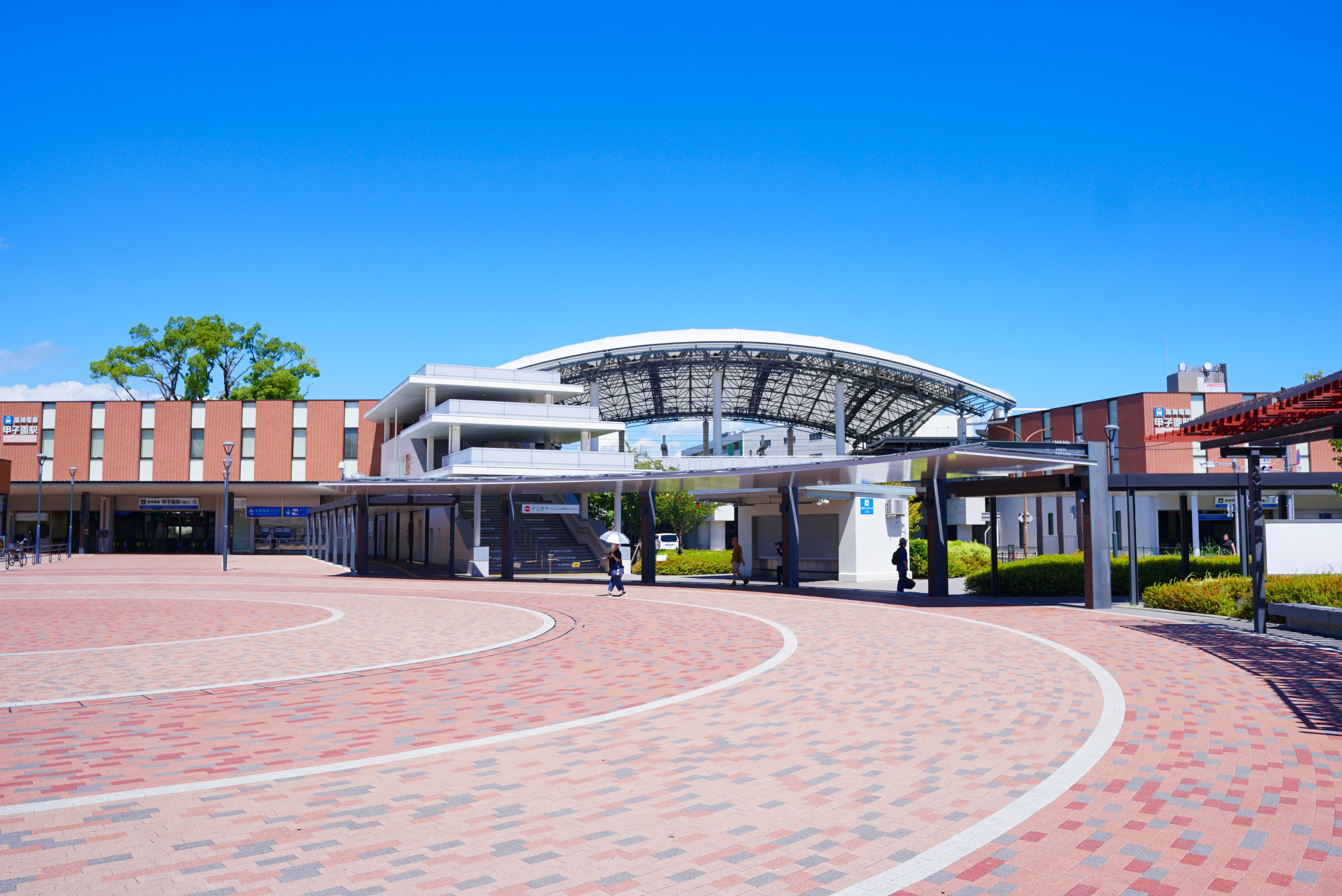
- South square, September 2025

General information
- Location: Kōshien Nanabanchō, Nishinomiya-shi, Hyōgo-ken; Japan
- Coordinates: 34°43′26.07″N 135°21′47.49″E
- Operator: Hanshin Electric Railway
- Line: ■ Hanshin Main Line
- Distance: 14.0 km (8.7 miles) from Umeda
- Platforms: 2 island platforms
- Tracks: 4
- Connections: Bus terminal

Construction
- Structure type: Elevated

Other information
- Station code: HS 14
- Website: Official website

History
- Opened: 1 August 1924

Passengers
- 2019: 44,690 (daily)
Services
Hanshin Electric Railway Main Line (HS 14)
Naruo - Mukogawajoshidai-Mae (HS 13)	Local	Kusugawa (HS 15)
Naruo - Mukogawajoshidai-Mae (HS 13)	Morning Express (weekdays)	Imazu (HS 16) (2 Osaka-Umeda-bound trains only)
Mukogawa (HS 12)	Express	Imazu (HS 16)
Amagasaki (HS 09); Mukogawa (HS 12) (except weekday mornings/evenings)	Rapid Express	Imazu (HS 16) (except weekday mornings/evenings); Nishinomiya (HS 17)
Amagasaki (HS 09)	Limited Express; Direct Limited Express (except 7 eastbound trains on weekday mornings)	Nishinomiya (HS 17)
Amagasaki (HS 09)	Morning Limited Express (Osaka-Umeda-bound trains only on weekdays)	Imazu (HS 16)
Location
- Location within Hyōgo Prefecture Location within Japan

Kōshien Station (甲子園駅, Kōshien-eki; station number: HS-14) is a passenger railway station located in the city of Amagasaki Hyōgo Prefecture, Japan. It is operated by the private transportation company Hanshin Electric Railway. It is the nearest station to Hanshin Koshien Stadium.

== Lines ==
Kōshien Station is served by the Hanshin Main Line, and is located 14.1 kilometres (8.8 mi) from the terminus of the line at Umeda.

== Station layout ==
This station has two elevated island platforms and a side platform serving four tracks, and an additional side track is located in the west of the platforms. There was also a side platform to the north of Track 1 until autumn 2014. Ticket gates are located at the east and the west, and there is stadium exit from the side platform serving Track 4 to the west.

Every year from 2011 until 2014, the two side platforms were closed for removal work from November till mid-March and boarded from late March until October for the events. One to the north of Track 1 was removed in November 2014 to locate new Track 1 and widen the eastbound platform, completed on February 21, 2015. The other was also removed to locate new Track 4 and the new side platform and widen the westbound platform, completed on March 14.

Two elevators were situated on October 26, 2013, one for each platform connecting to the west gate.

=== Platforms ===
1, 2	■ ■■Main Line	for Amagasaki, Osaka (Umeda, Namba), and Nara
3, 4	■ ■■Main Line	for Kobe Sannomiya, Akashi, and Himeji
	■ alighting only	when events are held at Koshien Stadium

=== Renovation ===
On June 8, 2011, Hanshin Electric Railway announced plans to renovate Koshien Station from autumn 2011, with work completed by spring 2017. Of four platforms at the station, a side platform for unloading eastbound trains was removed and the remaining three platforms were widened to accommodate an elevator connecting the west gate on each platform and another elevator connecting the east gate on each of the two platforms used for boarding trains. The west gate was widened to ease access to Hanshin Koshien Stadium, covering a camphor tree in the south of the station. The east entrance is situated near the east gate making it easier for passengers to access the eastern area of the station. A large roof covers the center of the platforms and the tracks.

== History ==
- 1 August 1924 - Koshien Station opened as an extra station.
- 1 July 1926 - The Koshien Line opened from this station to Hama-Koshien.
- 16 July 1926 - The station on the Main Line became an all-season station.
- 25 June 1928 - The Koshien Line was extended from this station to Kami-Koshien.
- 24 April 1949 - Baseball specters fell over like a file of dominoes, killing one and injuring eleven.
- 6 May 1975 - The Koshien Line was abandoned.
- 17 January 1995 - The Great Hanshin earthquake hit the Main Line and operations were temporarily halted.
  - The train operation resumed on the Main Line from Umeda to Koshien on January 18, from Koshien to Ogi on January 26, and on the whole line on June 26.
- 21 December 2013 - Introduction of station numbering: Koshien designated as station number HS-14.

== Passenger statistics ==
In fiscal 2019, the station was used by an average of 44,690 passengers daily.

== Surrounding area ==
=== East ===
- LaLaPort Koshien
  - KidZania Koshien
- Ito Yokado
- Koshien Police Station
- Nishinomiya Municipal Naruo Library
- Hanshin Bus southbound stops
  - for Koshien Hachibancho
  - for Hanshin Amagasaki via Koshien Hachibancho / for Hanshin Nishinomiya via Hamakoshien
  - for Hamakoshien
  - for Mukogawa-danchi
  - for Takasu-higashi
  - for Naruohama
  - airport limousine for Osaka International Airport (operated by Hanshin Bus and Osaka Airport Transport)

=== West ===
- Hanshin Koshien Stadium
- Daiei Koshien
- Hanshin Bus northbound stops
  - for JR Koshienguchi
  - for Hanshin Nishinomiya via JR Nishinomiya
  - for Nishinomiya-Kitaguchi (operated by Hanshin Bus and Hankyu Bus)
  - for Takarazuka via Koyanosato and Takarazuka City Hospital
  - for Amagasaki-Hamada Depot and Hanshin Kuise-eki-kita via Nishi-Oshima
  - to Namba (running after night games) (suspended in 2011 and 2012, resumed in 2013)
- Novotel Koshien

== Gallery ==
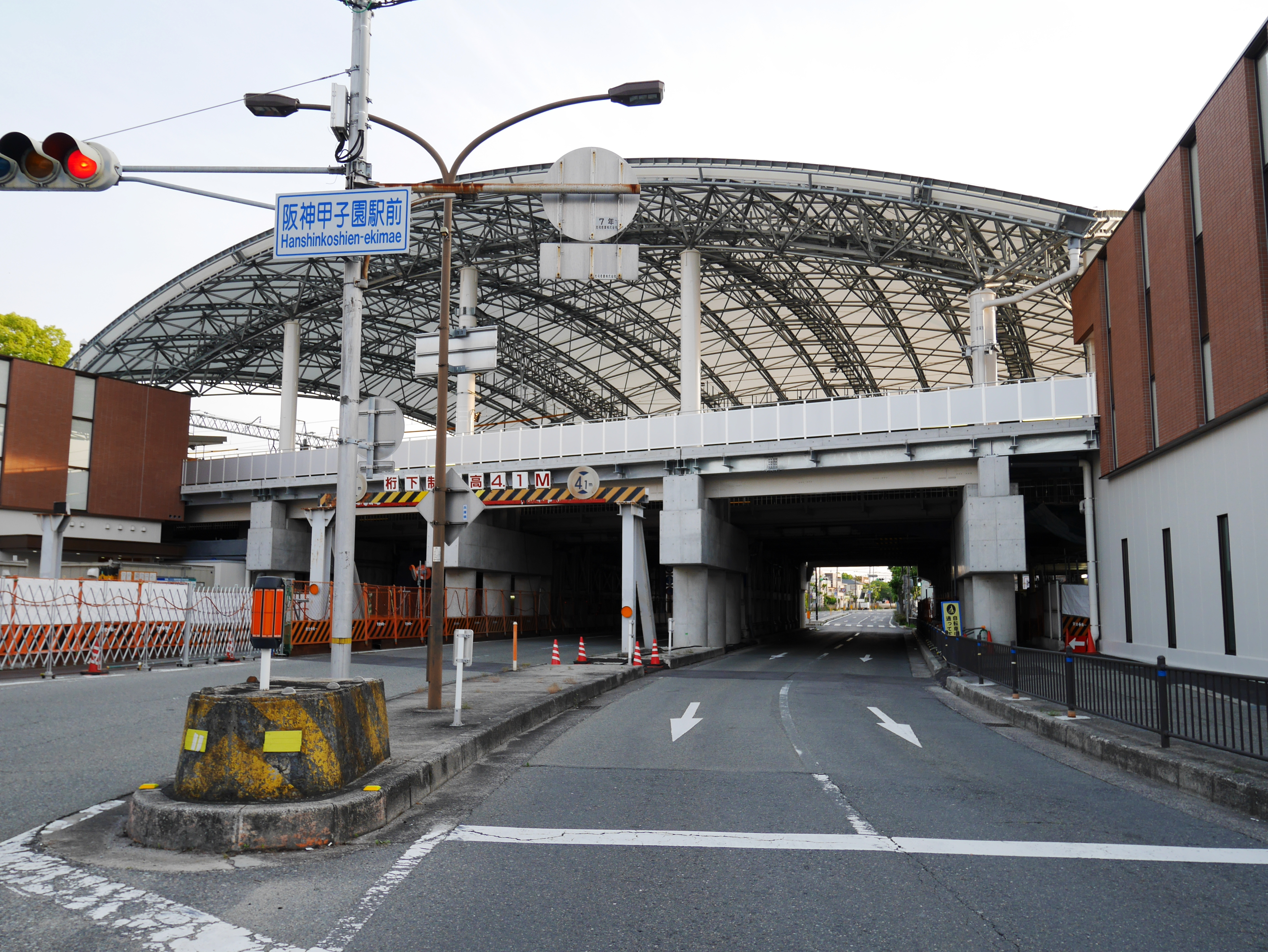
Station building in May 2015

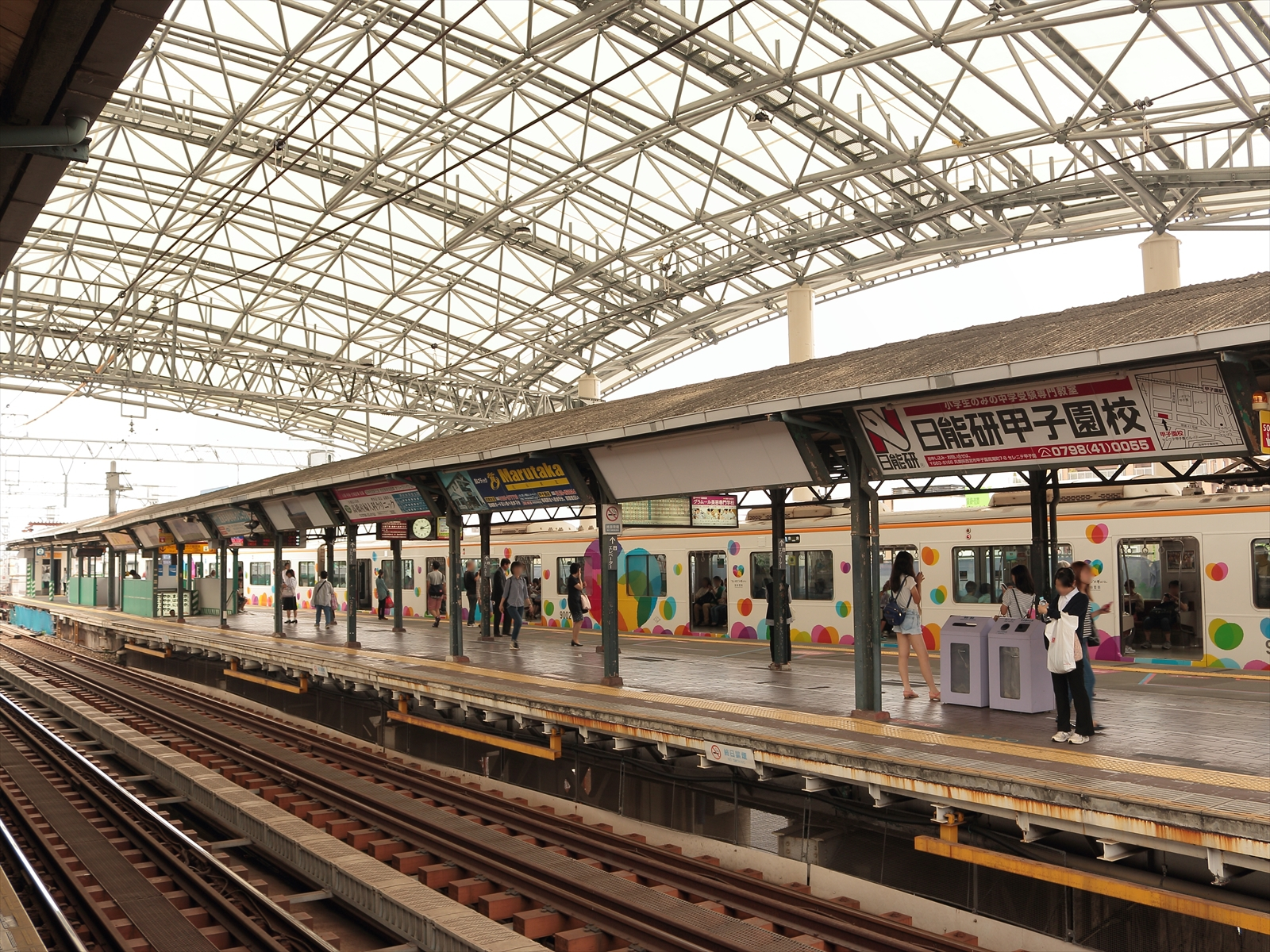
Station platforms in July 2015

== See also ==
- List of railway stations in Japan
