= Ashiya Station (JR West) =

Railway station in Ashiya, Hyōgo Prefecture, Japan

Ashiya Station 芦屋駅
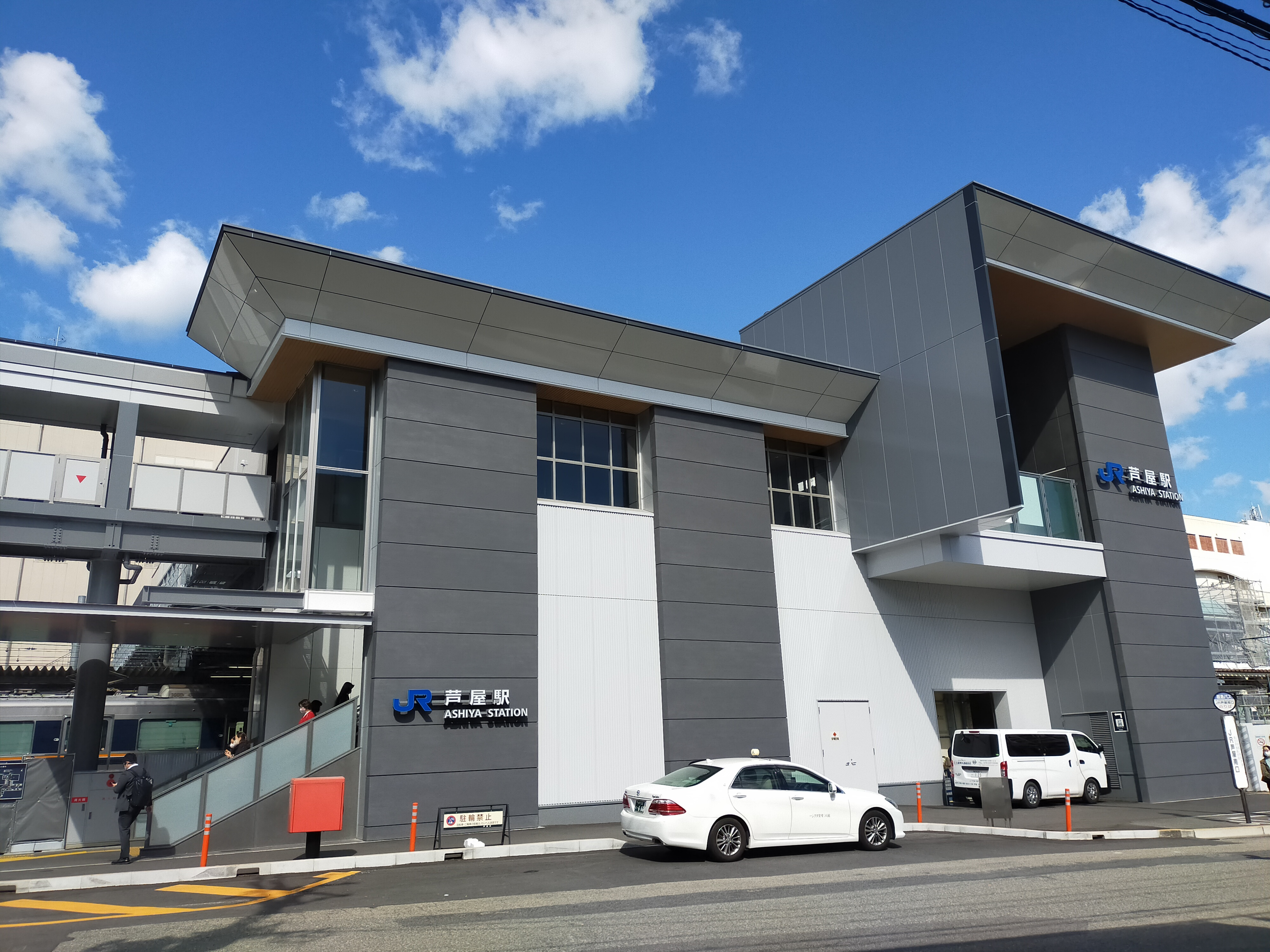
- Ashiya Station, July 2022

General information
- Location: 11 Funatochō, Ashiya-shi, Hyōgo-ken 659-0093; Japan
- Coordinates: 34°44′3.27″N 135°18′25.45″E
- Owner: JR West
- Operator: JR West
- Line: Tōkaidō Main Line (JR Kobe Line)
- Distance: 575.6 km (357.7 miles) from Tokyo
- Platforms: 2 island platforms
- Connections: Bus stop

Construction
- Structure type: Ground level
- Accessible: Yes

Other information
- Status: Staffed (Midori no Madoguchi)
- Station code: JR-A54
- Website: Official website

History
- Opened: 1 August 1913

Passengers
- FY 2023: 47,982 daily
Location
- Location within Hyōgo Prefecture Location within Japan

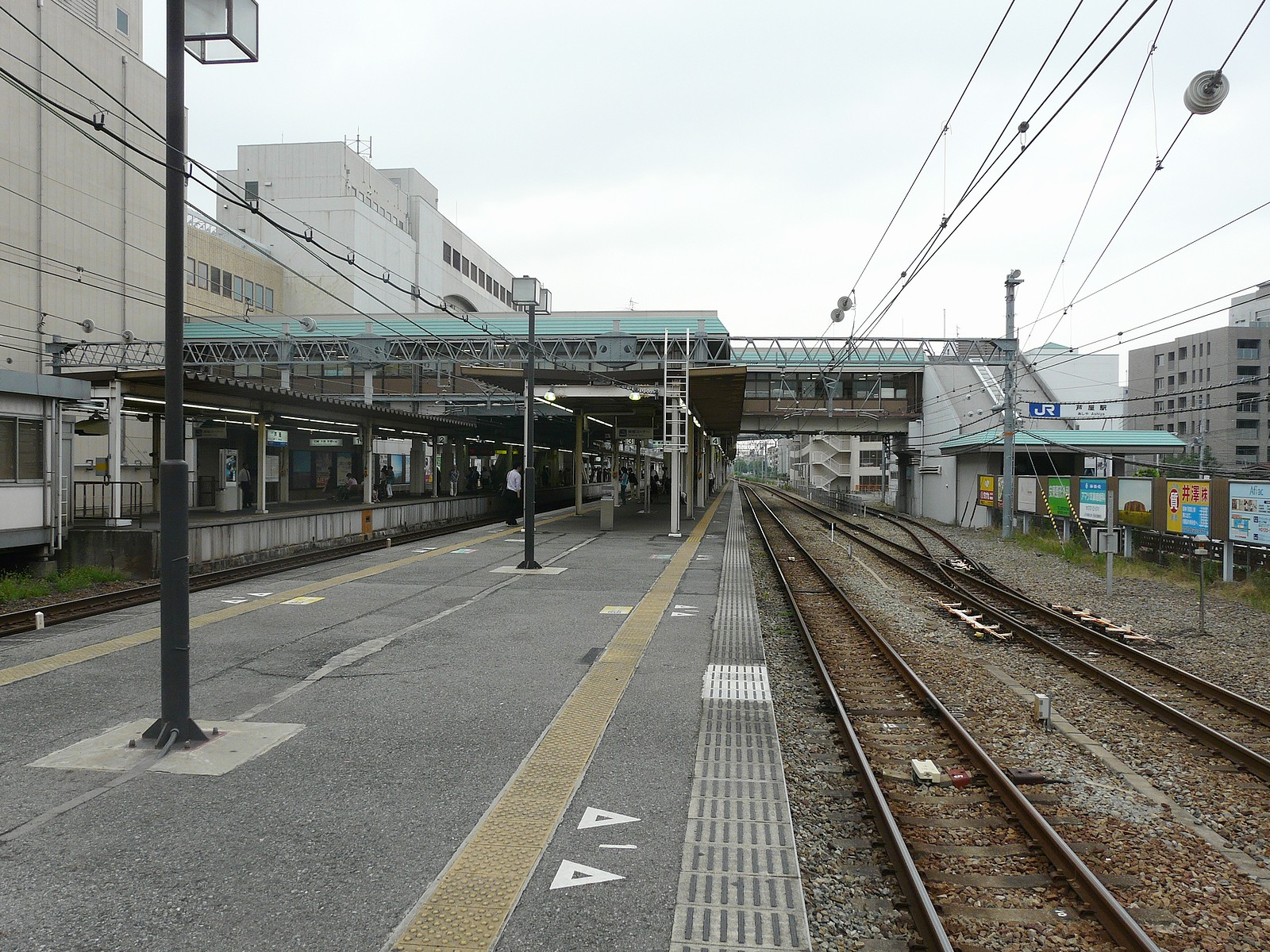
Platforms

Ashiya Station (芦屋駅, Ashiya-eki) is a passenger railway station located in the city of Ashiya, Hyōgo Prefecture, Japan. It is operated by the West Japan Railway Company (JR West).

== Lines ==
Ashiya Station is served by the Tōkaidō Main Line (JR Kobe Line), and is located 575.6 kilometers from the terminus of the line at Tokyo and 19.2 kilometers from Osaka. All JR Kobe Line commuter trains stop at Ashiya, and the station serves as the connection point between local trains and rapid/special rapid services.

== Station layout ==
The station consists of two ground-level island platforms serving six tracks, connected by an elevated station building. The outer main lines (tracks 1 and 6) are used by limited express trains and freight trains, and do not have platforms. The station has a Midori no Madoguchi staffed ticket office.

=== Platforms ===
| 1 | ■ JR Kobe Line | Special Rapid services for Amagasaki, Osaka and Kyoto; Local trains for Amagasaki and Kitashinchi (connecting with Rapid services) |
| 2 | ■ JR Kobe Line | Local and Rapid services for Amagasaki, Osaka and Kyoto (connecting with Special Rapid services or no connection) |
| 3 | ■ JR Kobe Line | Local trains for Sannomiya and Nishi-Akashi (connecting with Special Rapid services or no connection); Rapid services for Sannomiya and Himeji |
| 4 | ■ JR Kobe Line | Special Rapid services for Sannomiya and Himeji (also used for Rapid services in the evening); Local trains for Sannomiya and Nishi-Akashi (connecting with rapid services, except in the evening) |

== Adjacent stations ==
| « | Service | » |
JR West Tōkaidō Line (JR Kobe Line)
| Sakura Shukugawa (JR-A53) | Local | Konan-Yamate (JR-A55) |
| Nishinomiya (JR-A52) | Rapid Service | Sumiyoshi (JR-A57) |
| Amagasaki (JR-A49) | Special Rapid Service | Sannomiya (JR-A61) |

== History ==
Ashiya Station opened on 1 August 1913. With the privatization of the Japan National Railways (JNR) on 1 April 1987, the station came under the aegis of the West Japan Railway Company.

Station numbering was introduced to the station in March 2018 with Ashiya being assigned station number JR-A54.

== Passenger statistics ==
In fiscal 2020, the station was used by an average of 21,715 passengers daily

== Surrounding area ==
There is a Daimaru Ashiya store in the station building, which is located in the urban center of Ashiya.

== See also ==
- List of railway stations in Japan
