= Kusugawa Station =

Railway station in Nishinomiya, Hyōgo Prefecture, Japan

Kusugawa Station 久寿川駅
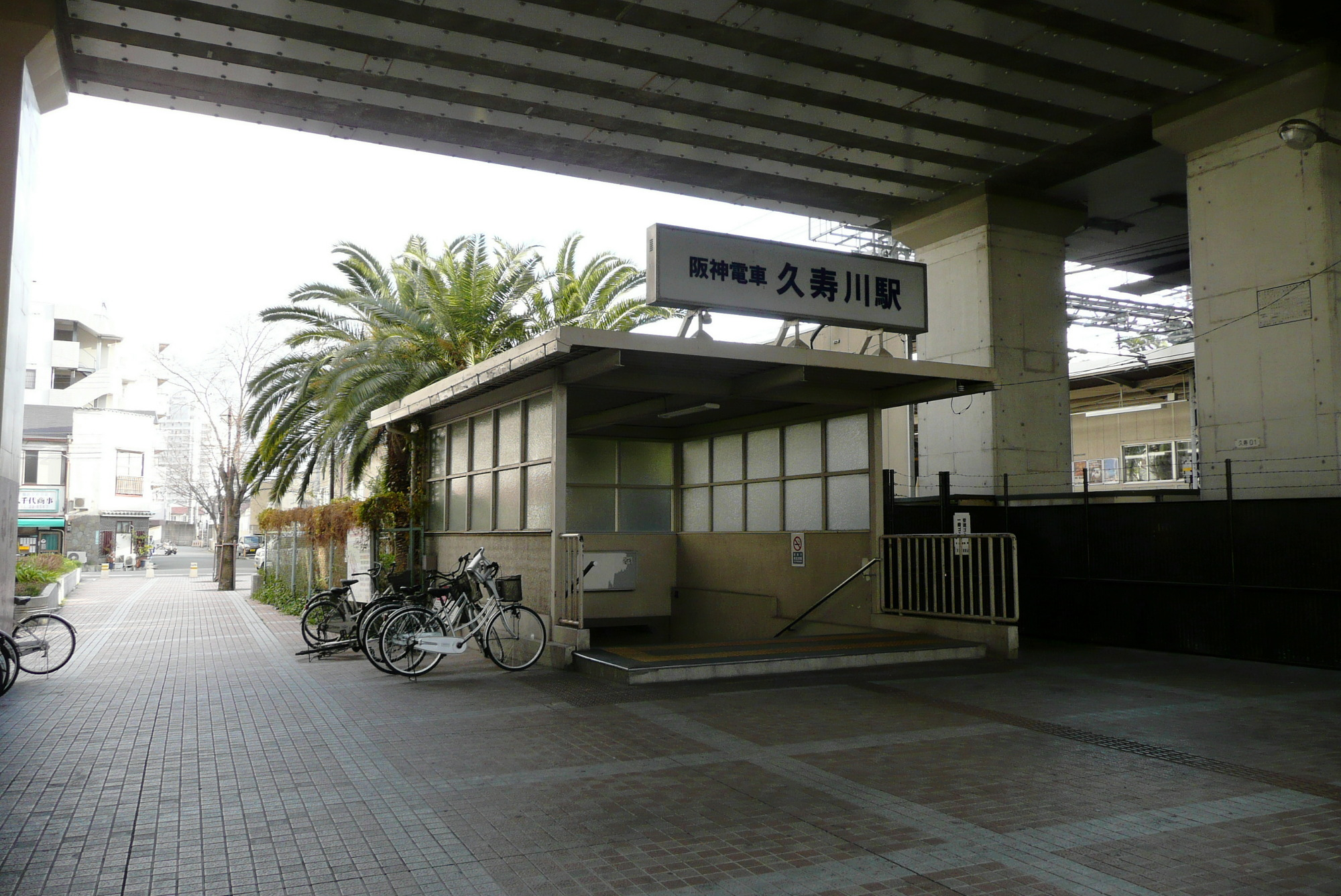
- Kusugawa Station

General information
- Location: Imazu Akebono-cho, Nishinomiya-shi, Hyōgo-ken 663-8214; Japan
- Coordinates: 34°43′37″N 135°21′25″E
- Operator: Hanshin Electric Railway
- Line: ■ Hanshin Main Line
- Distance: 14.8 km (9.2 miles) from Umeda
- Platforms: 2 side platforms
- Connections

Construction
- Structure type: ground station

Other information
- Status: Staffed
- Station code: HS 15
- Website: Official website

History
- Opened: 12 April 1905
- Former names: Imazu (until 1925)

Passengers
- 2019: 2,326 (boarding passengers only)

Services
Hanshin Main Line (HS 15)
Kōshien (HS 14)	Local	Imazu (HS 16)
Express: Does not stop at this station
Rapid Express: Does not stop at this station
Morning Limited Express for Umeda: Does not stop at this station
Limited Express; Through Limited Express: Does not stop at this station
Location
- Location within Hyōgo Prefecture Location within Japan

Kusugawa Station (久寿川駅, Kusugawa-eki; station number: HS-15) is a passenger railway station located in the city of Amagasaki Hyōgo Prefecture, Japan. It is operated by the private transportation company Hanshin Electric Railway.

== Lines ==
Kusugawa Station is served by the Hanshin Main Line, and is located 14.8 kilometres (9.2 miles) from the terminus of the line at Umeda.

== Layout ==
The station consists of two opposed ground-level side platforms serving two tracks.

=== Platforms ===
1	■ Main Line	for Koshien, Amagasaki, Osaka (Umeda), Namba, and Nara
2	■ Main Line	for Kobe (Sannomiya), Akashi, and Himeji

== History ==
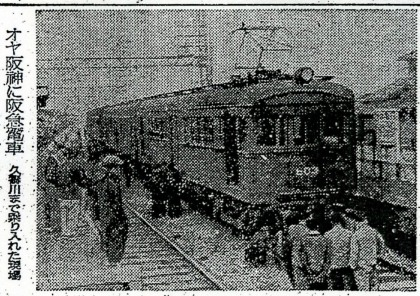
Scene of the accident in 1949

Imazu Station opened on 12 April 1905 along with the rest of the Hanshin Main Line. It would be renamed to its current name, Kusugawa Station, on 19 December 1929.

The station was the site of a derailment on 13 December 1949 when a runaway train from the Hankyu Line collided with the platform. At that time, Hankyu trains were slightly wider than the Hanshin trains. There was also a spur connecting to the Hankyū Imazu Line west of this location.

On 17 January 1995, all services were suspended due to the Great Hanshin earthquake. Service on the line was fully restored by 26 June 1995.

Station numbering was introduced on 21 December 2013, with Nishinomiya being designated as station number HS-15.

== Gallery ==
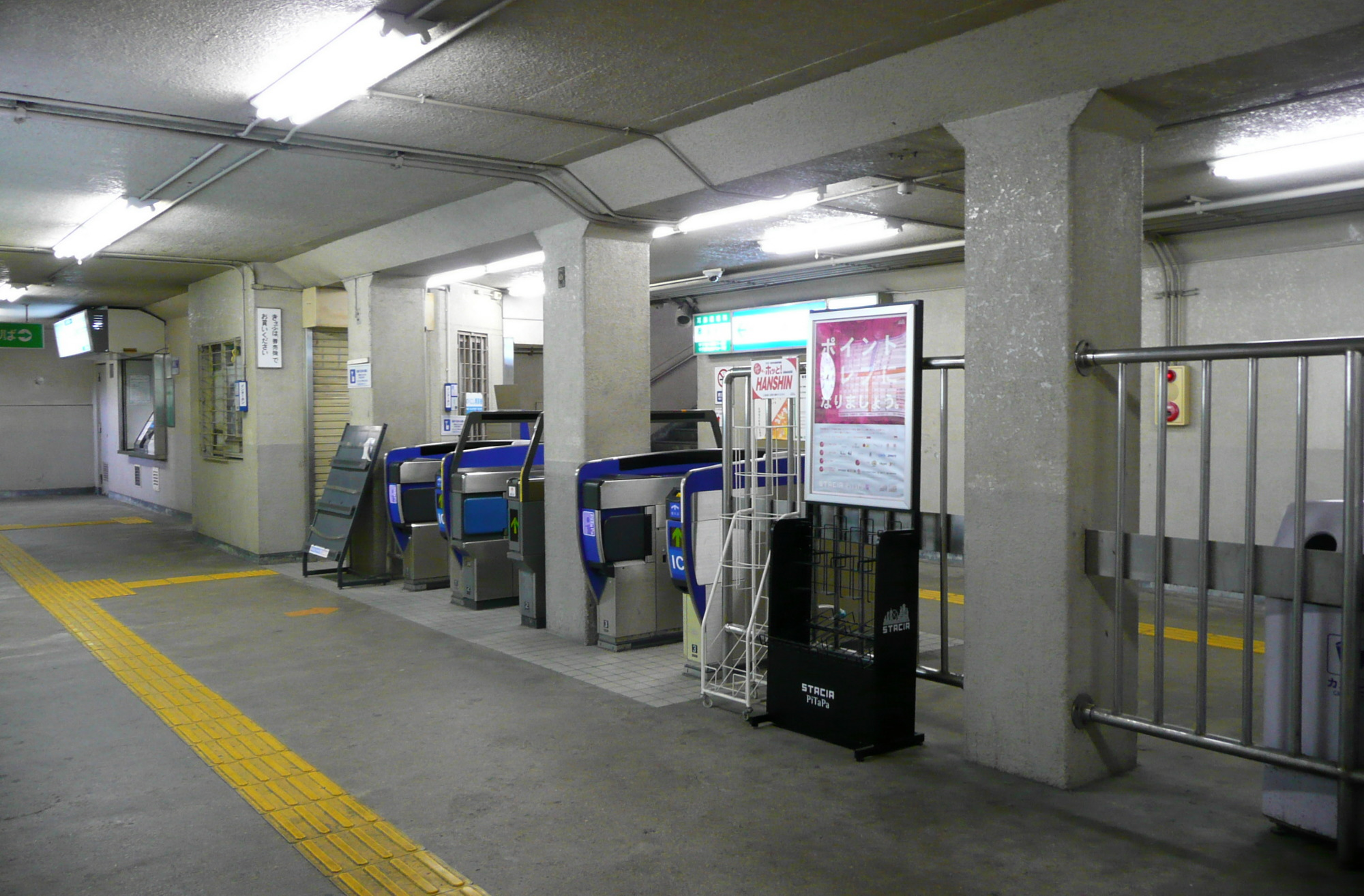
A view of the ticket gate before station renovation

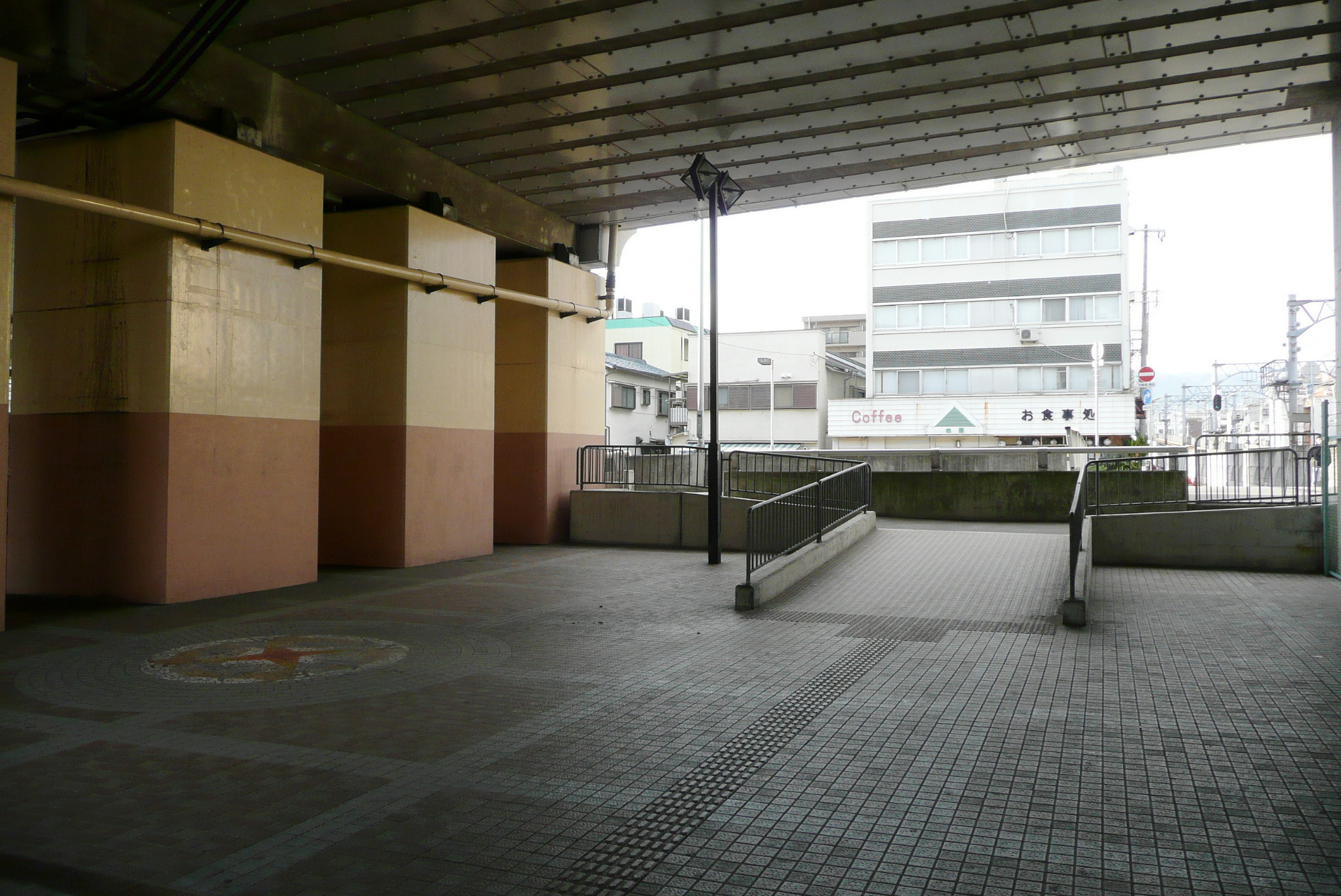
South side station square

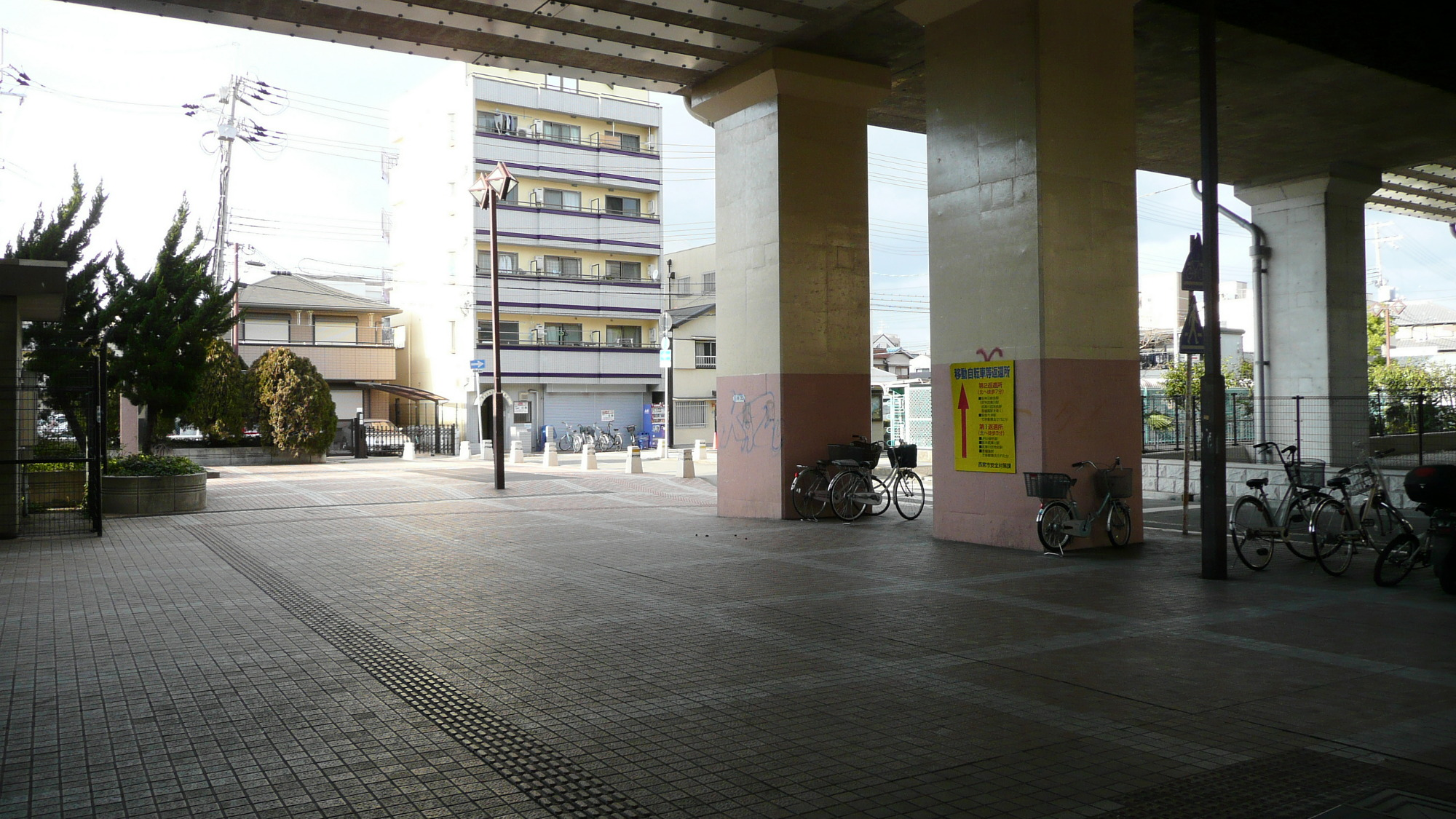
Scenery in front of the north exit

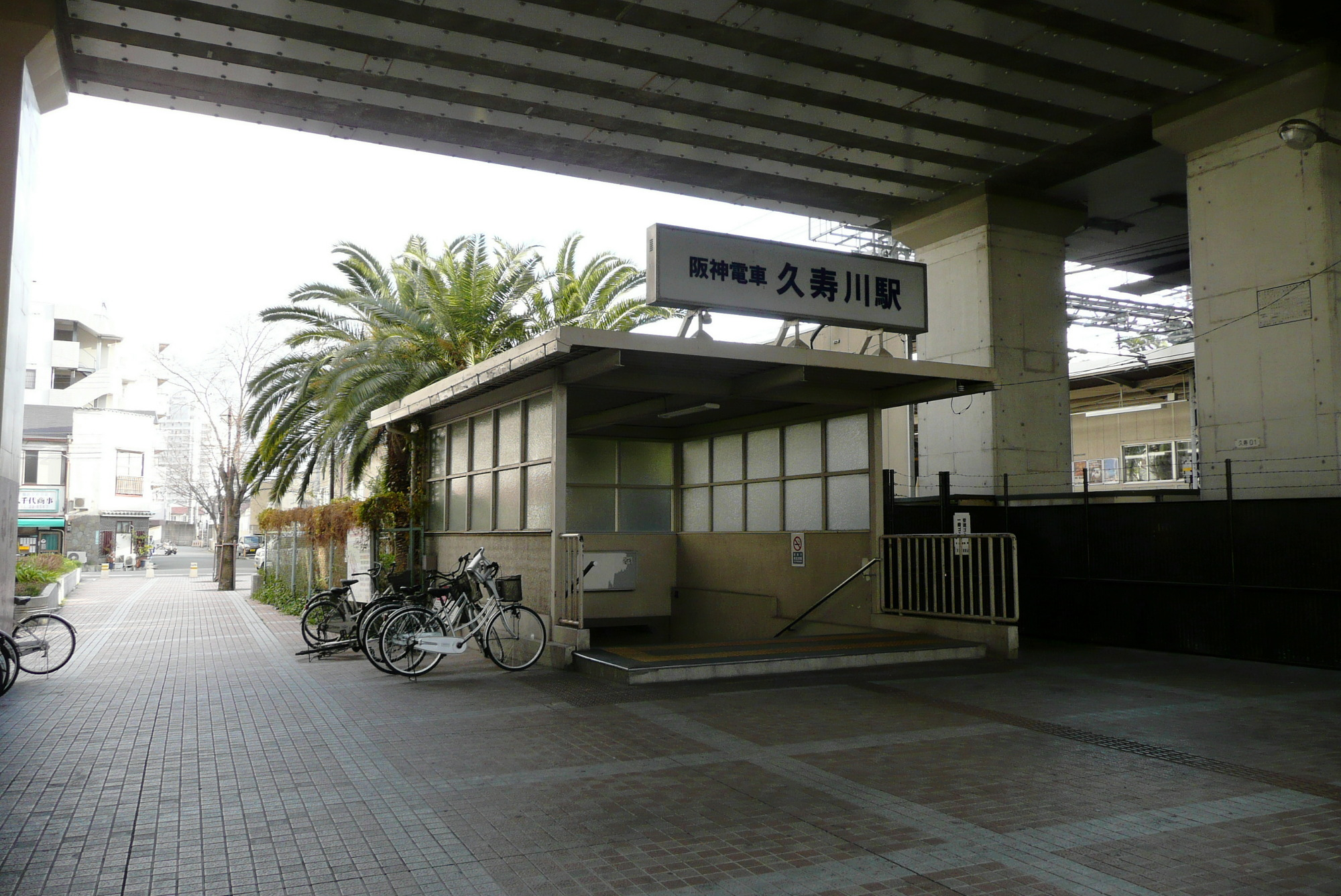
North Exit

== Surrounding area ==
- Nishinomiya Imazu Post Office
- Nishinomiya Kyoritsu Neurosurgical Hospital
- Nishinomiya Municipal Nishinomiya Support School

== See also ==
- List of railway stations in Japan
