= Tachibana Station =

Railway station in Amagasaki, Hyōgo Prefecture, Japan

Tachibana Station 立花駅
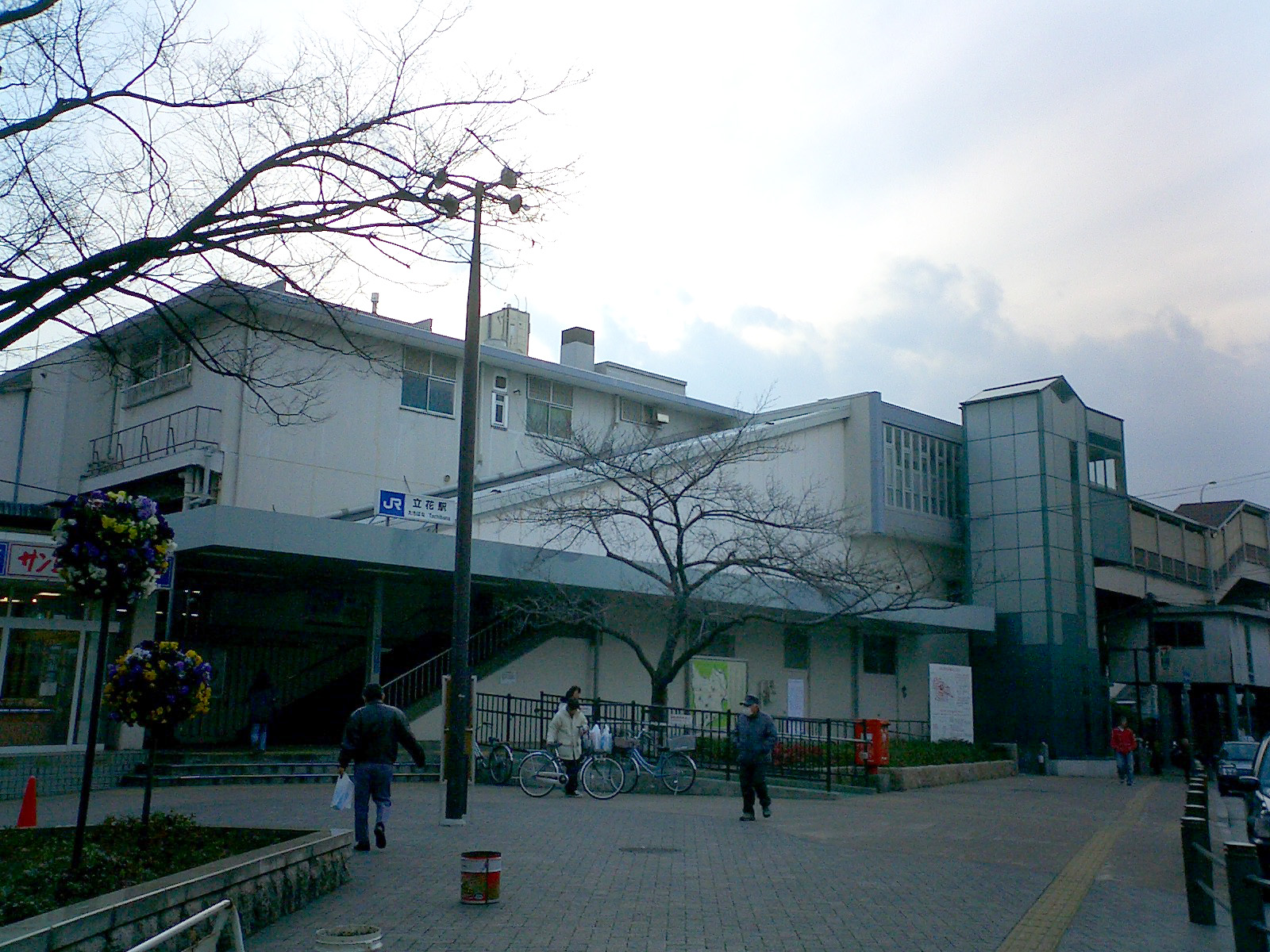
- Tachibana Station North exit

General information
- Location: 1-chōme-1 Tachibanachō, Amagasaki-shi, Hyōgo-ken 661-0025; Japan
- Coordinates: 34°44′16.66″N 135°23′56.84″E
- Owner: West Japan Railway Company
- Operator: West Japan Railway Company
- Line: Tōkaidō Main Line (JR Kobe Line)
- Distance: 567.1 km (352.4 miles) from Tokyo
- Platforms: 2 island platforms
- Connections: Bus stop

Other information
- Status: Staffed (Midori no Madoguchi)
- Station code: JR-A50
- Website: Official website

History
- Opened: 20 July 1934

Passengers
- FY 2023: 44,962 daily
Location
- Location within Hyōgo Prefecture Location within Japan

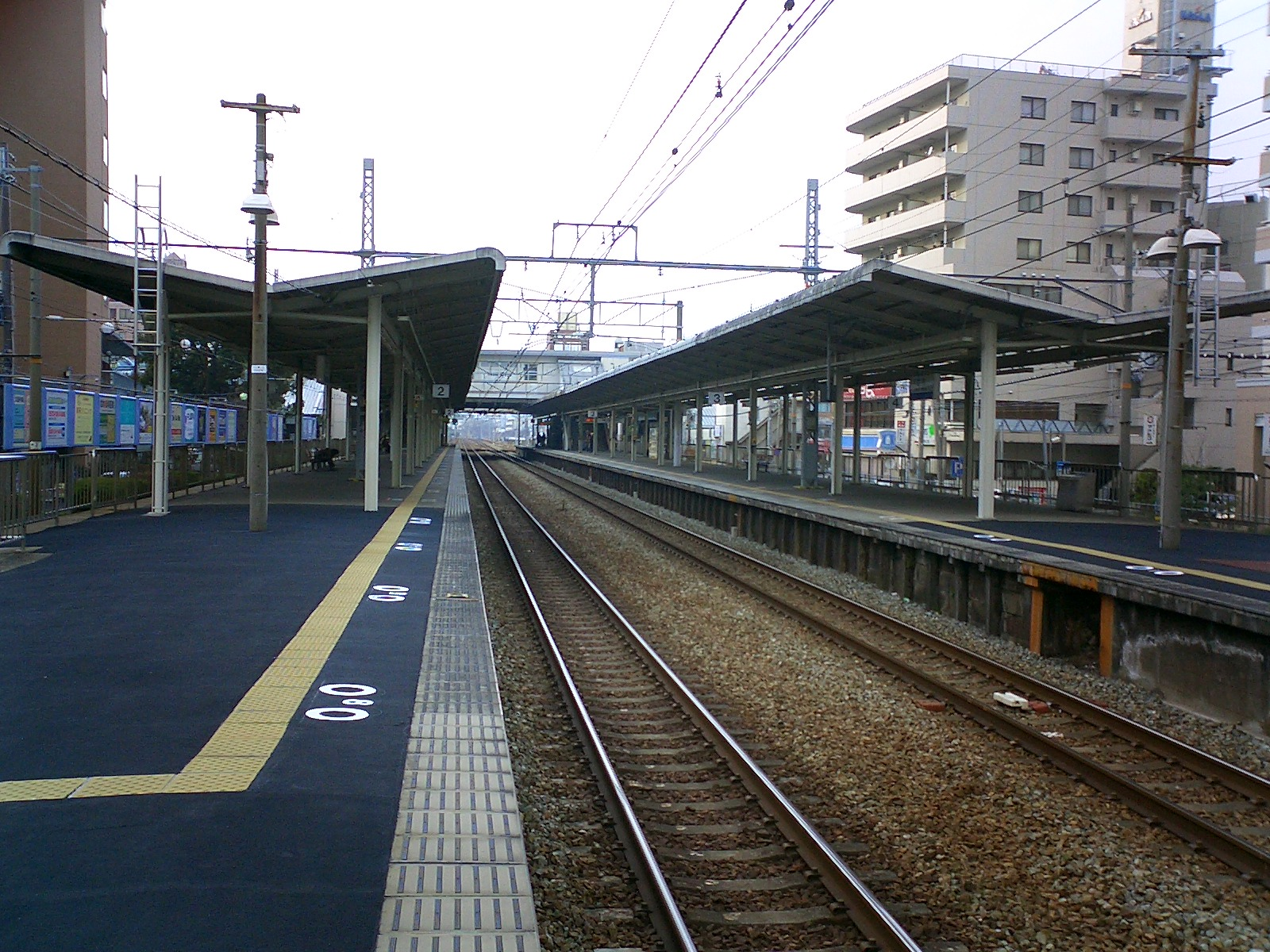
Platforms

Tachibana Station (立花駅, Tachibana-eki) is a passenger railway station located in the city of Amagasaki, Hyōgo Prefecture, Japan. It is operated by the West Japan Railway Company (JR West).

== Lines ==
Tachibana Station is served by the Tōkaidō Main Line (JR Kobe Line), and is located 567.1 kilometers from the terminus of the line at Tokyo and 10.7 kilometers from Osaka.

== Station layout ==
The station consists of two ground-level island platforms serving four tracks, connected by an elevated station building. However, since only local trains stop at this station, only inside platforms 2 and 3 are used, and outside platforms 1 and 4 are equipped with simple fences. Limited express trains, freight trains, new rapid trains, and rapid trains that operate during the morning rush hour on weekdays pass outside (platforms 1 and 4), and other rapid trains pass through platforms 2 and 3, where local trains stop.The station has a Midori no Madoguchi staffed ticket office.

=== Platforms ===
1	■ JR Kobe Line	(through traffic only)
2	■ JR Kobe Line	for Sannomiya and Himeji
3	■ JR Kobe Line	for Amagasaki, Osaka and Kitashinchi
4	■ JR Kobe Line	for (through traffic only)

== Adjacent stations ==
«	Service	»
Tōkaidō Main Line (JR Kōbe Line)
Amagasaki (JR-A49)	Local	Kōshienguchi (JR-A51)
Rapid Service: Does not stop at this station
Special Rapid Service: Does not stop at this station

== History ==
Tachibana Station opened on 20 July 1934. With the privatization of the Japan National Railways (JNR) on 1 April 1987, the station came under the aegis of the West Japan Railway Company.

Station numbering was introduced to the station in March 2018 with Tachibana being assigned station number JR-A50.

== Passenger statistics ==
In fiscal 2020, the station was used by an average of 20,761 passengers daily

== Surrounding area ==
- Amagasaki City Hall
- Amagasaki Public Health Center

== See also ==
- List of railway stations in Japan
