= Kōshienguchi Station =

Railway station in Nishinomiya, Hyōgo Prefecture, Japan

Kōshienguchi Station 甲子園口駅
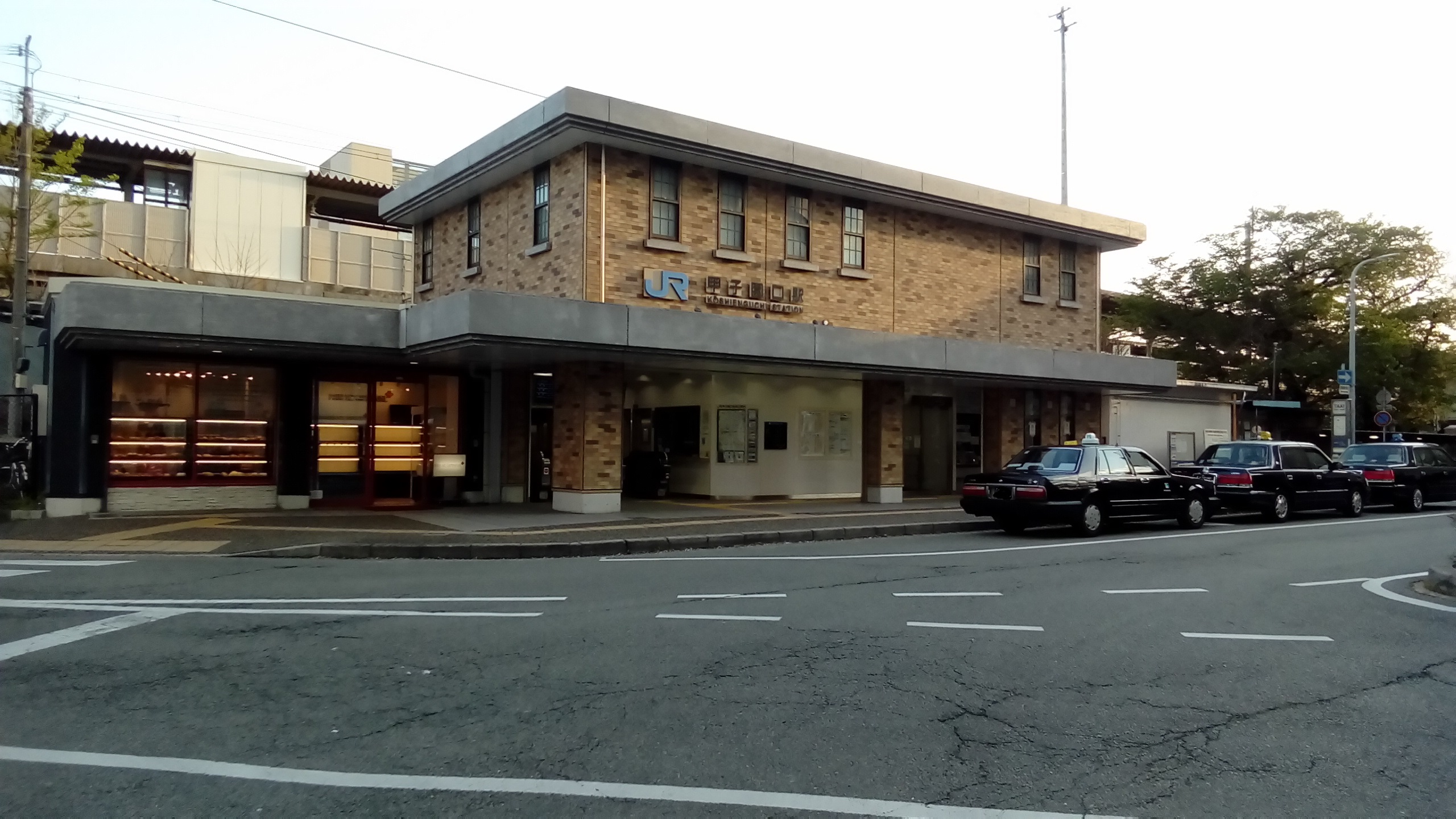
- Kōshienguchi Station North exit, April 2020

General information
- Location: 1-36 Kōshienguchi Nichōme, Nishinomiya-shi, Hyōgo-ken 661-0025; Japan
- Coordinates: 34°44′20.23″N 135°22′28.93″E
- Owner: West Japan Railway Company
- Operator: West Japan Railway Company
- Line: Tōkaidō Main Line (JR Kobe Line)
- Distance: 569.3 km (353.7 miles) from Tokyo
- Platforms: 2 island platforms
- Connections: Bus stop

Construction
- Structure type: Ground level

Other information
- Status: Staffed (Midori no Madoguchi)
- Station code: JR-A51
- Website: Official website

History
- Opened: 20 July 1934

Passengers
- FY 2023: 34,362 daily
Location
- Location within Hyōgo Prefecture Location within Japan

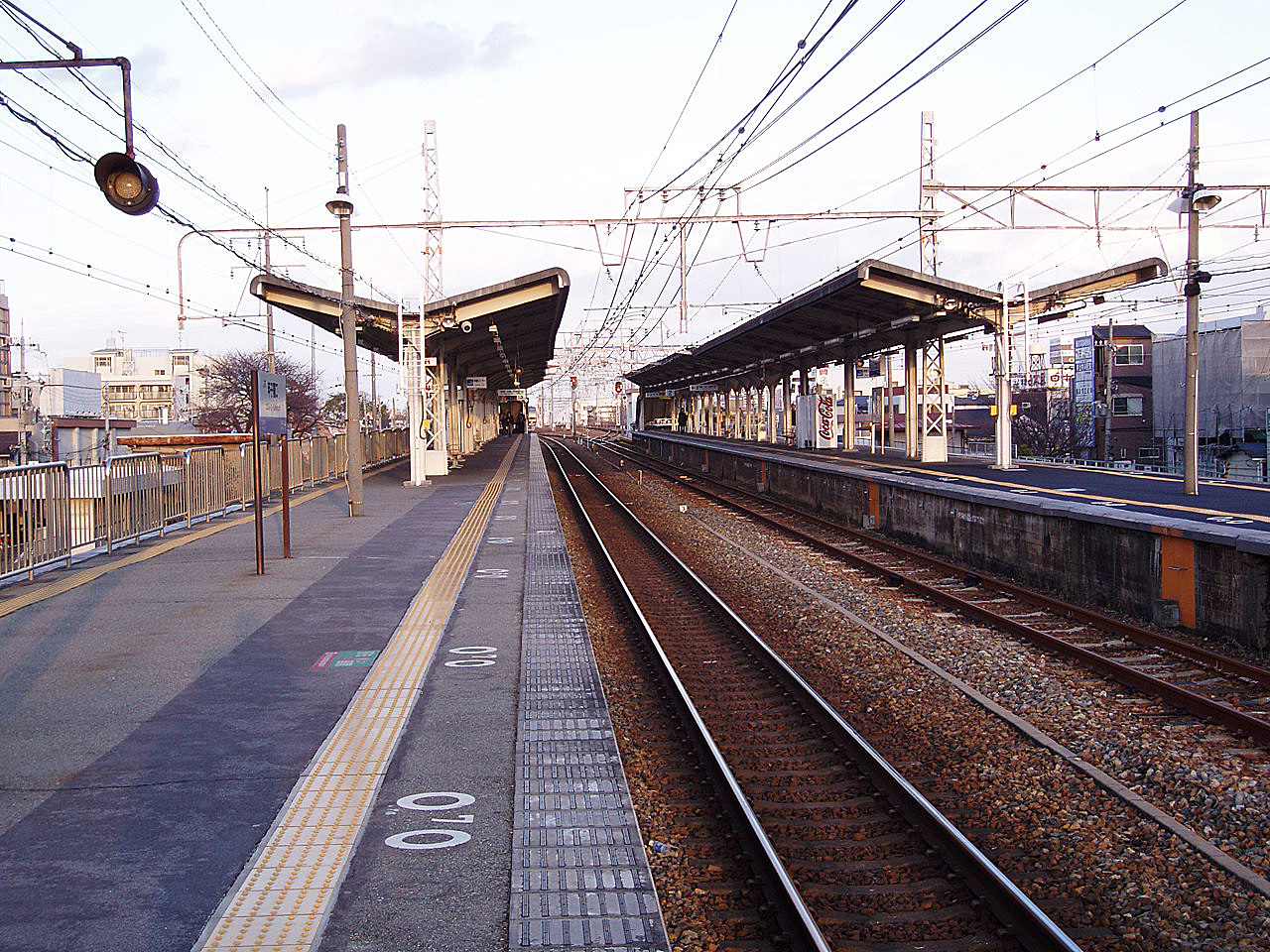
Platforms

Kōshienguchi Station (甲子園口駅, Kōshienguchi-eki) is a passenger railway station located in the city of Nishinomiya, Hyōgo Prefecture, Japan. It is operated by the West Japan Railway Company (JR West). Despite the station's name roughly translating to “Koshien Stadium Entrance”, it is located nowhere near the venue, and a bus is required to reach it. The name is derived from the neighborhood the station is in, which is also called Kōshienguchi despite being distant from the stadium.

== Lines ==
Kōshienguchi Station is served by the Tōkaidō Main Line (JR Kobe Line), and is located 569.3 kilometers from the terminus of the line at Tokyo and 12.9 kilometers from Osaka.

== Station layout ==
The station consists of two island platforms on an embankment, serving three tracks, connected by a station building at ground-level. The outer line side of the inbound line (Platform 4) is closed with stainless steel fences, but there is a space that can be removed at almost equal intervals, and it is prepared for temporary stops of group trains and outer line trains and in case of emergency. However, it has never been actually used.The station has a Midori no Madoguchi staffed ticket office.

=== Platforms ===
1	■ JR Kobe Line	for Sannomiya and Himeji
2	■ JR Kobe Line	for Amagasaki, Osaka and Kitashinchi
3	■ JR Kobe Line	for Amagasaki, Osaka and Kitashinchi
4	■ JR Kobe Line	for (through traffic only)

== Adjacent stations ==
«	Service	»
West Japan Railway Company (JR West)
Tōkaidō Line (JR Kobe Line)
Tachibana (JR-A50)	Local	Nishinomiya (JR-A52)
Rapid Service: Does not stop at this station
Special Rapid Service: Does not stop at this station

== History ==
Kōshienguchi Station opened on July 20, 1934. With the privatization of the Japan National Railways (JNR) on April 1, 1987, the station came under the aegis of the West Japan Railway Company.

Station numbering was introduced to the station in March 2018 with Kōshienguchi being assigned station number JR-A51.

== Passenger statistics ==
In fiscal 2019, the station was used by an average of 18,735 passengers daily

== Surrounding area ==
- Muko River
- Mukogawa Women's University Kamikoshien Campus (Koshien Hall)
- Koshienguchi Shopping Street
- Koshien Junior College
- Koshien Gakuin Junior and Senior High School
- Koshien Gakuin Elementary School

== See also ==
- List of railway stations in Japan
