= Kōnan-Yamate Station =

Railway station in Kobe, Japan

Kōnan-Yamate Station 甲南山手駅
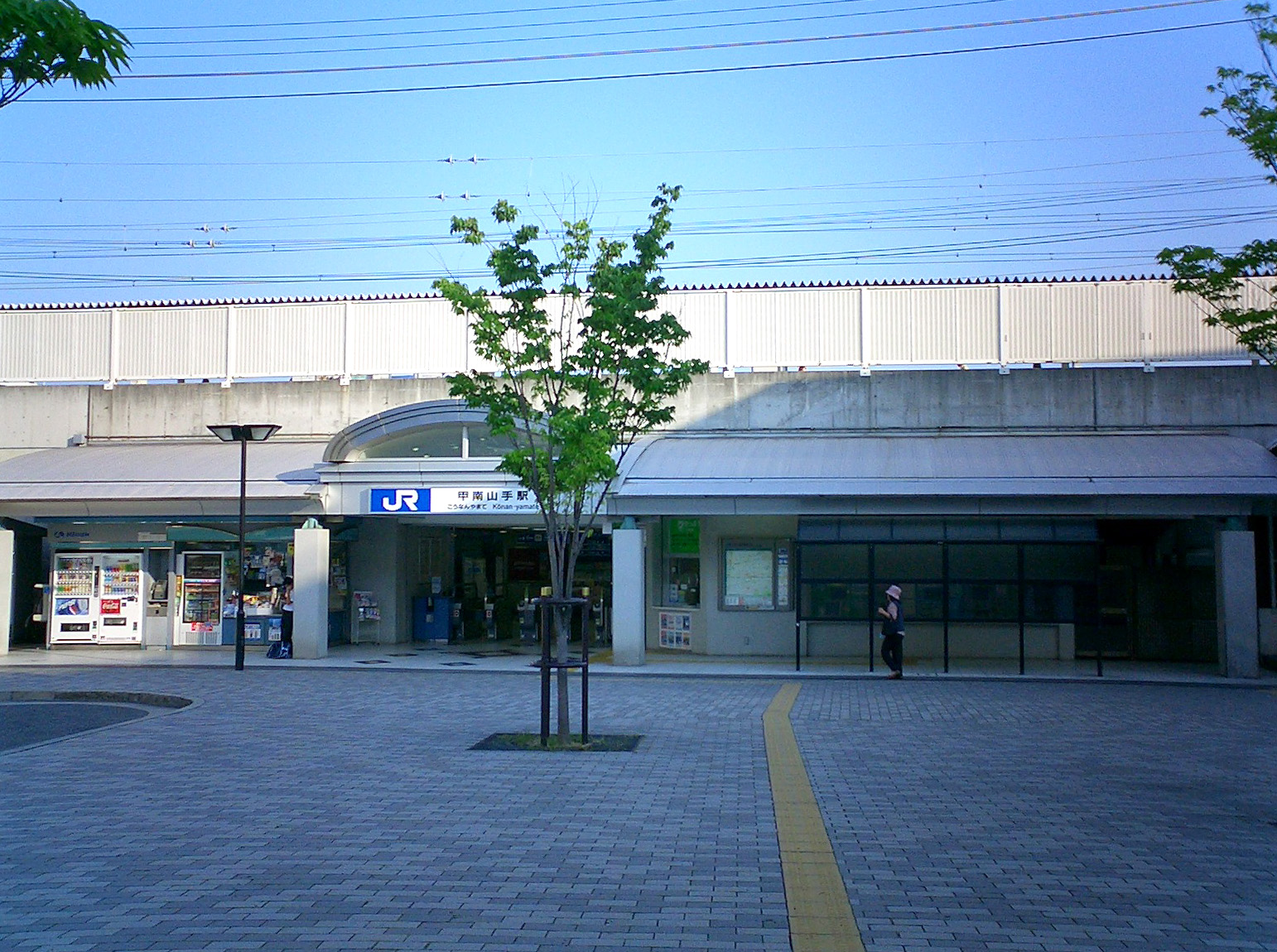
- Kōnan-Yamate Station, July 2006

General information
- Location: 1-1 Morikitamachi, Higashinada-ku, Kobe-shi, Hyōgo-ken 659-0093; Japan
- Coordinates: 34°43′50.1″N 135°17′32.73″E
- Owner: JR West
- Operator: JR West
- Line: Tōkaidō Main Line (JR Kobe Line)
- Distance: 577.0 km (358.5 miles) from Tokyo
- Platforms: 1 island platform
- Connections: Bus stop

Construction
- Structure type: Elevated
- Accessible: Yes

Other information
- Status: Staffed
- Station code: JR-A55
- Website: Official website

History
- Opened: 1 October 1996

Passengers
- FY 2023: 20,702 daily
Location
- Location within Hyōgo Prefecture Location within Japan

Kōnan-Yamate Station (甲南山手駅, Kōnan-Yamate-eki) is a passenger railway station located in Higashinada-ku, Kobe, Hyōgo Prefecture, Japan. It is operated by the West Japan Railway Company (JR West).

== Lines ==
Kōnan-Yamate Station is served by the Tōkaidō Main Line (JR Kobe Line), and is located 577.0 kilometers from the terminus of the line at Tokyo and 20.6 kilometers from Osaka.

== Station layout ==
The station consists of one elevated island platform with the station building underneath. The station is staffed.

=== Platforms ===
1	■ JR Kobe Line	for Amagasaki, Osaka and Kitashinchi
2	■ JR Kobe Line	for Sannomiya and Himeji

== Adjacent stations ==
«	Service	»
Tōkaidō Line (JR Kobe Line)
Ashiya (JR-A54)	Local	Settsu-Motoyama (JR-A56)
Rapid Service: Does not stop at this station
Special Rapid Service: Does not stop at this station

== History ==
Kōnan-Yamate Station opened on 1 October 1996.

Station numbering was introduced to the station in March 2018 with Kōnan-Yamate being assigned station number JR-A55.

== Passenger statistics ==
In fiscal 2020, the station was used by an average of 11,516 passengers daily

== Surrounding area ==
- Konan Women's University
- Konan Girls' Junior and Senior High School
- Kobe Municipal Motoyama Third Elementary School

== See also ==
- List of railway stations in Japan
