= JR Kōbe Line =

Railway line in Japan

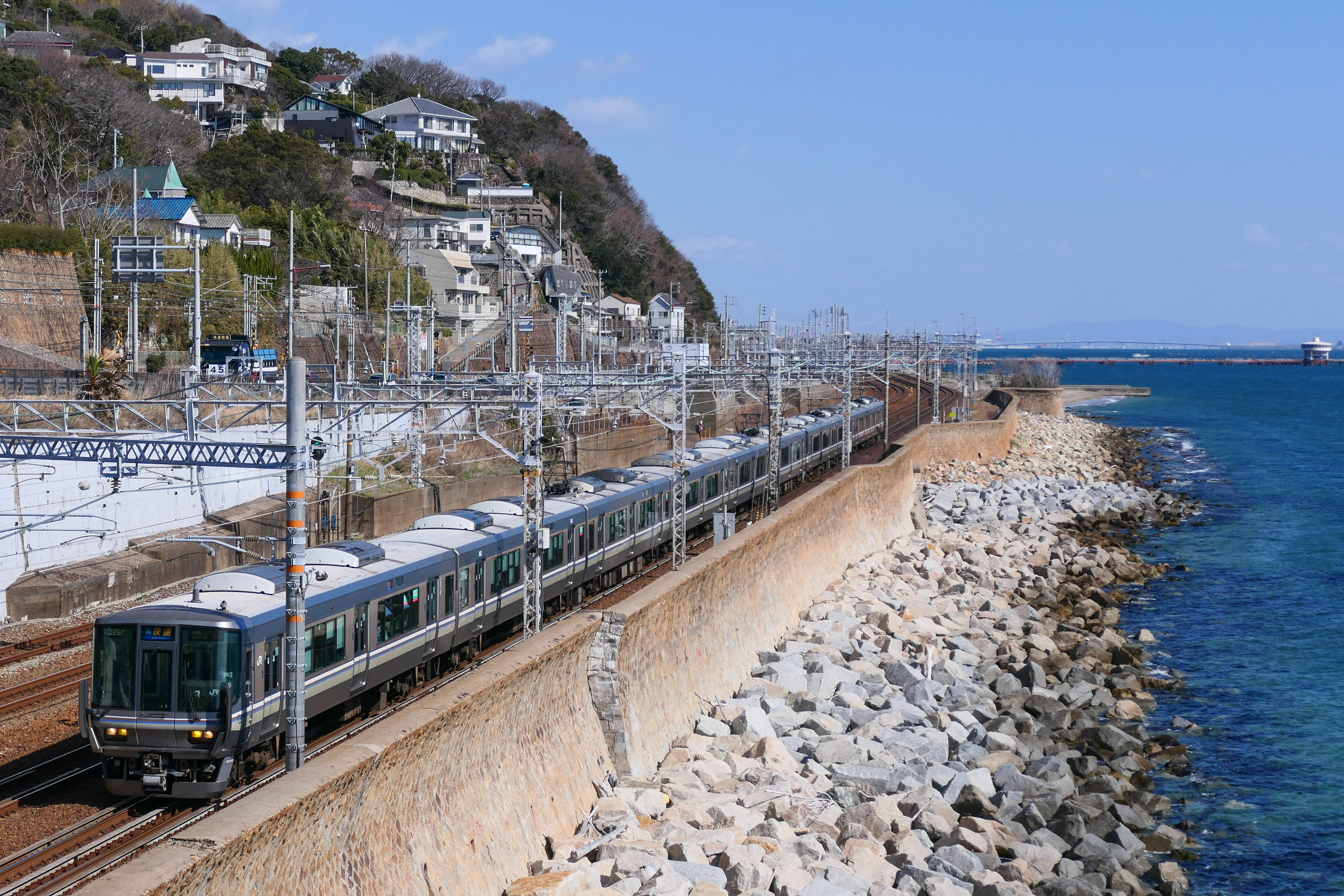
- 223-2000 series on a Rapid Service, February 2021

Overview
- Native name: JR神戸線
- Locale: Osaka Prefecture and Hyōgo Prefecture
- Termini: Osaka (Tōkaidō Main Line); Himeji (San'yō Main Line)
- Stations: 39

Service
- System: Urban Network
- Operator(s): JR West; JR Freight

History
- Opened: May 11, 1874 (as part of Tokaido Main Line); March 13, 1988 (renamed as JR Kōbe Line)

Technical
- Line length: 87.9 km (54.6 mi)
- Track gauge: 1,067 mm (3 ft 6 in)
- Electrification: 1,500 V DC (overhead line)
- Operating speed: 130 km/h (81 mph)

The JR Kōbe Line (JR神戸線, JR Kōbe-sen) is the nickname of portions of the Tōkaidō Main Line and the San'yō Main Line, between Osaka Station in Osaka, Osaka Prefecture and Himeji Station in Himeji, Hyōgo Prefecture. The line, along with the JR Kyōto Line and the Biwako Line, forms a contiguous service that is the main trunk of West Japan Railway Company's Urban Network commuter rail network in the Osaka-Kobe-Kyoto Metropolitan Area. The line also offers continuous service to the Gakkentoshi Line via the JR Tōzai Line.

== Trains ==
Sleeper Limited Express (寝台特急, Shindai tokkyuu)

- Sunrise Seto (サンライズ瀬戸) & Sunrise Izumo (サンライズ出雲)

Limited Express (特急, tokkyuu)

- Hamakaze (はまかぜ) (links Osaka to Hamasaka and Tottori)
- Super Hakuto (スーパーはくと) (links Kyoto, Osaka to Tottori and Kurayoshi)

Commuter Limited Express (通勤特急, Tsuukin tokkyuu)

- Rakuraku Harima (らくラクはりま)

Special Rapid Service (新快速, shin-kaisoku)

- Continuing service from the Kyōto Line, trains stop at Osaka, Amagasaki, Ashiya, Sannomiya, Kobe, Akashi, Nishi-Akashi, Kakogawa and Himeji. Service extends beyond Himeji on San'yō Main Line to Aboshi, Kamigori and Ako Line to Banshu-Ako.

A kaisoku A快速

- This train runs in the morning from Nishi Akashi to Osaka station this train makes stops at Akashi, Hyogo, Kobe, Motomachi, Sannomiya, Rokkomichi, Sumiyoshi, Ashiya, Nishinomiya, Amagasaki, and Osaka.

Rapid Service (快速, kaisoku)

- Continuing service from the Kyōto Line, trains stop at Osaka, Amagasaki, Nishinomiya, Ashiya, Sumiyoshi, Rokkomichi, Sumiyoshi, Sannomiya, Motomachi, Kobe, Hyōgo, Suma, Tarumi, Maiko and Akashi as rapid service trains and every station after Akashi as local trains. Service extends beyond Himeji on Sanyo Main Line to Aboshi, Kamigori and Ako Line to Banshu-Ako. In the morning, the trains pass Suma, Tarumi and Maiko.

Local trains (普通, futsu)

- Continuing service from the Kyōto Line at Osaka and the JR Tōzai Line at Amagasaki. Makes every stop to Nishi-Akashi, with some extended service to Kakogawa during rush hour.

== Stations ==
Stations are listed from east to west.

●: Trains stop at all times
｜: Trains pass at all times
▲: Eastbound trains pass in the morning
○:Trains stop at morning of Weekdays only

JR Kōbe Line stations
Official line name	No.	Station	Japanese	Distance (km)		Stop			Transfers	Location	
Official line name	No.	Station	Japanese	Between stations	from Osaka	Local	Rapid	Special Rapid	Transfers	Ward, City	Prefecture
Through service to/from the JR Kyōto Line
Tōkaidō Main Line	JR-A47	Osaka	大阪	-	0.0	●	●	●	JR Kyōto Line (Tōkaidō Main Line); JR Takarazuka Line (JR-G47); Osaka Loop Line (JR-O11); Osaka Higashi Line (JR-F01); JR Tōzai Line (JR-H44:Kitashinchi Station); Hankyu Kobe Main Line, Hankyu Takarazuka Main Line, Hankyu Kyoto Main Line (HK-01:Osaka-umeda Station); Hanshin Main Line (HS 01:Osaka-Umeda Station); Osaka Metro: Midōsuji Line (M16: Umeda Station); Tanimachi Line (T20: Higashi-Umeda Station); Yotsubashi Line (Y11: Nishi-Umeda Station)	Kita-ku, Osaka	Osaka
Tōkaidō Main Line	JR-A48	Tsukamoto	塚本	3.4	3.4	●	|	|		Yodogawa-ku, Osaka	Osaka
Tōkaidō Main Line	JR-A49	Amagasaki	尼崎	4.3	7.7	●	●	●	JR Takarazuka Line (Fukuchiyama Line) (JR-G49); JR Tōzai Line (JR-H49)	Amagasaki	Hyōgo
Tōkaidō Main Line	JR-A50	Tachibana	立花	3.0	10.7	●	|	|		Amagasaki	Hyōgo
Tōkaidō Main Line	JR-A51	Koshienguchi	甲子園口	2.2	12.9	●	|	|		Nishinomiya	Hyōgo
Tōkaidō Main Line	JR-A52	Nishinomiya	西宮	2.5	15.4	●	●	|		Nishinomiya	Hyōgo
Tōkaidō Main Line	JR-A53	Sakura Shukugawa	さくら夙川	1.5	16.9	●	|	|		Nishinomiya	Hyōgo
Tōkaidō Main Line	JR-A54	Ashiya	芦屋	2.3	19.2	●	●	●		Ashiya	Hyōgo
Tōkaidō Main Line	JR-A55	Kōnan-Yamate	甲南山手	1.4	20.6	●	|	|		Higashinada-ku, Kobe	Hyōgo
Tōkaidō Main Line	JR-A56	Settsu-Motoyama	摂津本山	1.5	22.1	●	|	|		Higashinada-ku, Kobe	Hyōgo
Tōkaidō Main Line	JR-A57	Sumiyoshi	住吉	1.6	23.6	●	●	|	Kobe New Transit Rokko Island Line (R01)	Higashinada-ku, Kobe	Hyōgo
Tōkaidō Main Line	JR-A58	Rokkomichi	六甲道	2.2	25.9	●	●	|		Nada-ku, Kobe	Hyōgo
Tōkaidō Main Line	JR-A59	Maya	摩耶	1.4	27.3	●	|	|		Nada-ku, Kobe	Hyōgo
Tōkaidō Main Line	JR-A60	Nada	灘	0.9	28.2	●	|	|		Nada-ku, Kobe	Hyōgo
Tōkaidō Main Line	JR-A61	Sannomiya	三ノ宮	2.4	30.6	●	●	●	Hankyu Kobe Line, Kobe Kosoku Line (HK-16: Kobe Sannomiya Station); Hanshin Main Line (HS 32: Kobe Sannomiya Station); Kobe New Transit Port Island Line (P01); Kobe Municipal Subway Seishin-Yamate Line (S03: Sannomiya Station); Kobe Municipal Subway Kaigan Line (K01: Sannomiya-Hanadokeimae Station)	Chuo-ku, Kobe	Hyōgo
Tōkaidō Main Line	JR-A62	Motomachi	元町	0.8	31.4	●	●	|	Hanshin Main Line, Kobe Kosoku Line (HS 33)	Chuo-ku, Kobe	Hyōgo
Tōkaidō Main Line	JR-A63	Kobe	神戸	1.7	33.1	●	●	●	Hanshin Kobe Kosoku Line, Hankyu Kobe Kosoku Line (HS 35: Kōsoku Kōbe Station); Kobe Municipal Subway Kaigan Line (K04: Harborland Station)	Chuo-ku, Kobe	Hyōgo
San'yō Main Line	JR-A63	Kobe	神戸	1.7	33.1					Chuo-ku, Kobe	Hyōgo
San'yō Main Line	JR-A64	Hyōgo	兵庫	1.8	34.9	●	●	|	Wadamisaki Line(San'yō Main Line Wadamisaki Branch)	Hyogo-ku, Kobe	Hyōgo
San'yō Main Line	JR-A65	Shin-Nagata	新長田	2.3	37.2	●	|	|	Kobe Municipal Subway: Seishin-Yamate Line (S09), Kaigan Line (K10)	Nagata-ku, Kobe	Hyōgo
San'yō Main Line	JR-A66	Takatori	鷹取	1.0	38.2	●	|	|		Suma-ku, Kobe	Hyōgo
San'yō Main Line	JR-A67	Suma-Kaihinkōen	須磨海浜公園	0.9	39.1	●	|	|		Suma-ku, Kobe	Hyōgo
San'yō Main Line	JR-A68	Suma	須磨	1.3	40.4	●	▲	|	Sanyo Railway Main Line (SY 06: Sanyo Suma Station)	Suma-ku, Kobe	Hyōgo
San'yō Main Line	JR-A69	Shioya	塩屋	2.0	43.3	●	|	|	Sanyo Railway Main Line (SY 08: Sanyo Shioya Station)	Tarumi-ku, Kobe	Hyōgo
San'yō Main Line	JR-A70	Tarumi	垂水	2.9	46.2	●	▲	|	Sanyo Railway Main Line (SY 11: Sanyo Tarumi Station)	Tarumi-ku, Kobe	Hyōgo
San'yō Main Line	JR-A71	Maiko	舞子	2.0	48.2	●	▲	|	Sanyo Railway Main Line (SY 13: Maiko-koen Station)	Tarumi-ku, Kobe	Hyōgo
San'yō Main Line	JR-A72	Asagiri	朝霧	1.9	50.1	●	|	|		Akashi	Hyōgo
San'yō Main Line	JR-A73	Akashi	明石	2.4	52.5	●	●	●	Sanyo Railway Main Line (SY 17: Sanyo Akashi Station)	Akashi	Hyōgo
San'yō Main Line	JR-A74	Nishi-Akashi	西明石	3.4	55.9	●	●	●	San'yō Shinkansen	Akashi	Hyōgo
San'yō Main Line	JR-A75	Okubo	大久保	2.8	58.7	○	●	|		Akashi	Hyōgo
San'yō Main Line	JR-A76	Uozumi	魚住	3.5	62.2	○	●	|		Akashi	Hyōgo
San'yō Main Line	JR-A77	Tsuchiyama	土山	3.1	65.3	○	●	|		Harima	Hyōgo
San'yō Main Line	JR-A78	Higashi-Kakogawa	東加古川	3.3	68.6	○	●	|		Kakogawa	Hyōgo
San'yō Main Line	JR-A79	Kakogawa	加古川	3.6	72.2	○	●	●	Kakogawa Line	Kakogawa	Hyōgo
San'yō Main Line	JR-A80	Hoden	宝殿	3.3	75.5		●	|		Takasago	Hyōgo
San'yō Main Line	JR-A81	Sone	曽根	4.0	79.5		●	|		Takasago	Hyōgo
San'yō Main Line	JR-A82	Himeji Bessho	ひめじ別所	2.0	81.5		●	|		Himeji	Hyōgo
San'yō Main Line	JR-A83	Gochaku	御着	2.1	83.6		●	|		Himeji	Hyōgo
San'yō Main Line	JR-A84	Higashi-Himeji	東姫路	2.4	86.0		●	|		Himeji	Hyōgo
San'yō Main Line	JR-A85	Himeji	姫路	1.9	87.9		●	●	San'yō Shinkansen; San'yō Main Line; Bantan Line; Kishin Line; Sanyo Railway Main Line (SY 43: Sanyo-Himeji Station)	Himeji	Hyōgo
Through service to/from the San'yō Main Line and the Ako Line

A new metro station in Nishinomiya is planned to be built in a former industrial area.

== Rolling stock ==
=== Local ===
- 207 series (from 1991, through service with Fukuchiyama Line and Katamachi Line via JR Tōzai Line)
- 321 series (from 2005, through service with Fukuchiyama Line and Katamachi Line via JR Tōzai Line)

=== Special Rapid and Rapid ===
- 221 series (from 1989, through service with Akō Line via San'yō Line, rapid only, until 2023)
- 223-1000/2000series (from 1995, through service with Akō Line via San'yō Line)
- 225-0/100 series (from 2010, through service with Akō Line via San'yō Line)

=== Limited Express ===
- 285 series (Sunrise Izumo/Sunrise Seto service from July 1998, through service with Seto-Ōhashi Line and Hakubi Line)
- 289 series (Rakuraku Harima service from 18 March 2019)
- KiHa 189 series (Hamakaze service from 2010, through service with Sanin Main Line via Bantan Line)
- Chizu Express HOT7000 series (Super Hakuto service from 1994, through service with Sanin Main Line via Chizu Line)

=== Former ===
- 103 series (until August 1, 2005)
- 113 series (until October 16, 2004)
- 115 series
- 117 series (from 1980 until May 10, 1999)
- 201 series (from 1983 until 2007)
- 205-0 series (from 1986 until 2006, from 2011 until March 2013)
- KiHa 181 series (Hamakaze limited express, until 2010)
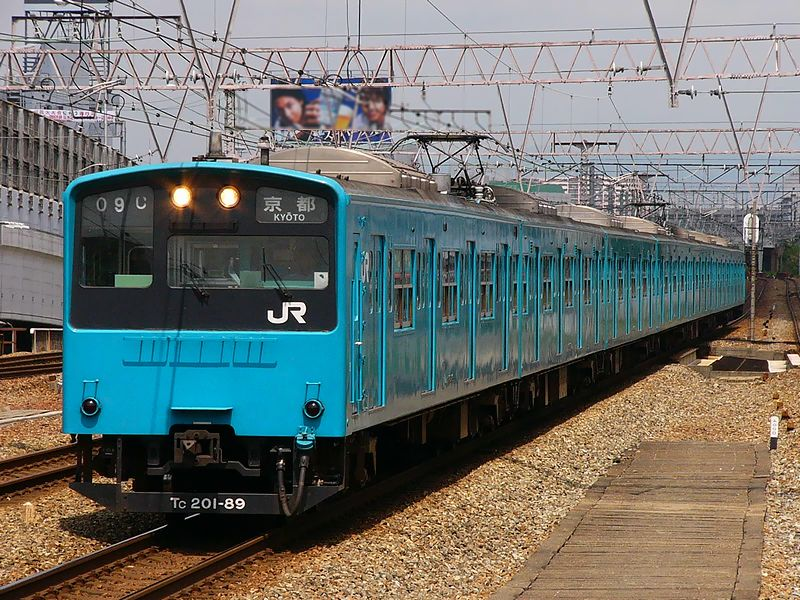
201 series that was once operated as a local service, August 2004

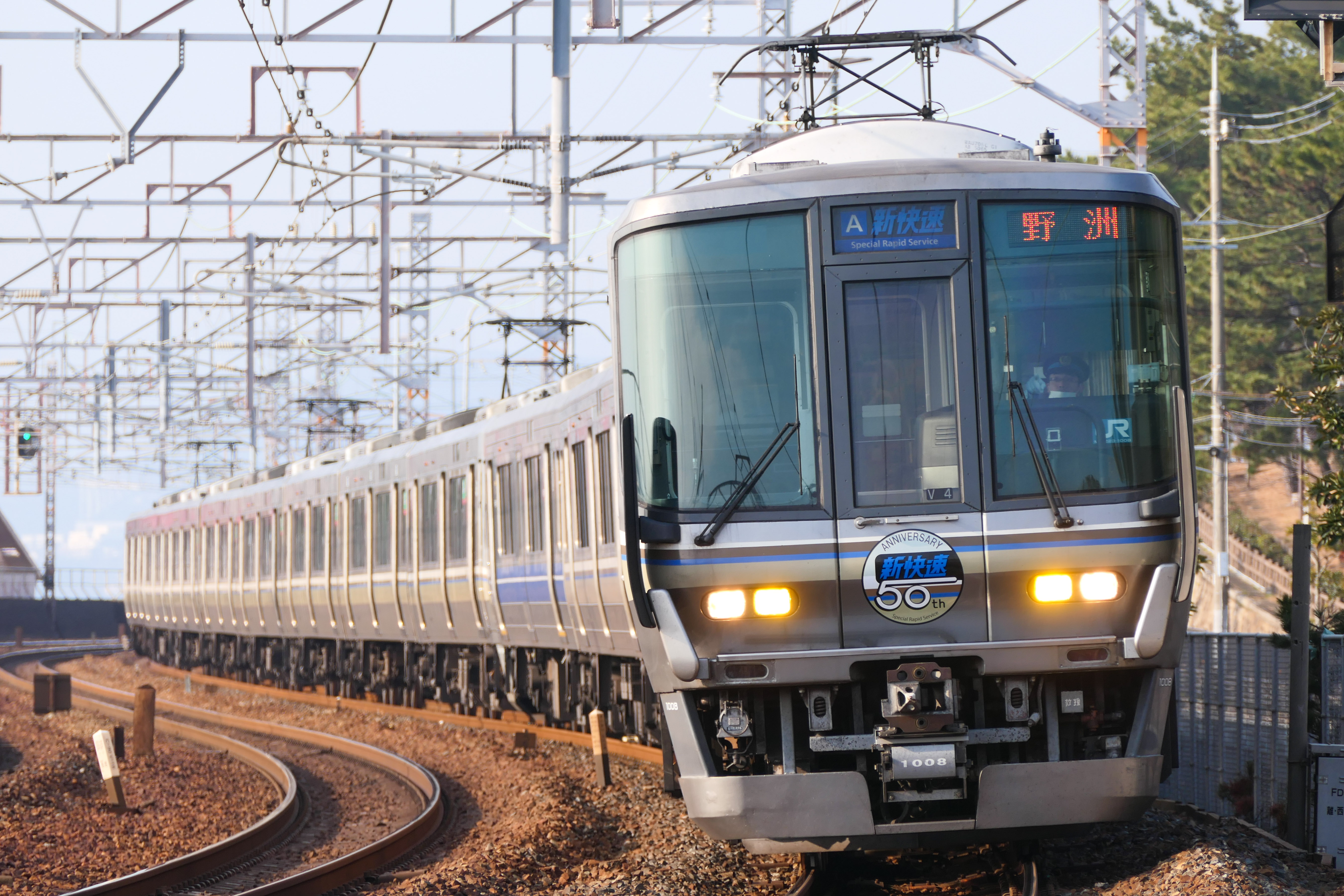
223 series operated at Special Rapid Service, January 2021

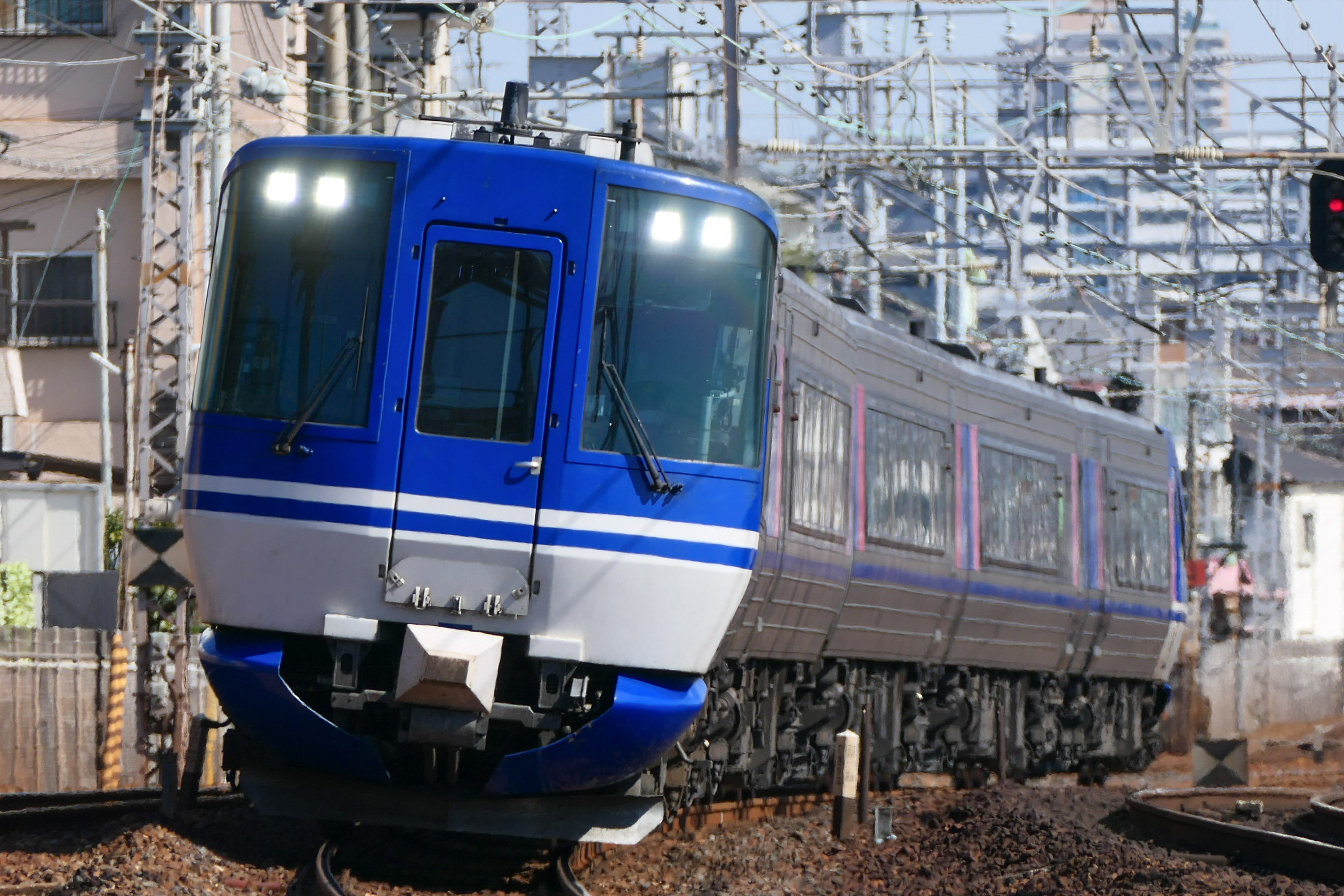
Chizu Express Super Hakuto will board the JR Tōkaidō / San'yō Main Line, February 2021

== See also ==
- Hankyu Kobe Line
- Biwako Line
- JR Kyōto Line
