= Nishinomiya Station (JR West) =

Railway station in Nishinomiya, Hyōgo Prefecture, Japan

Nishinomiya Station 西宮駅
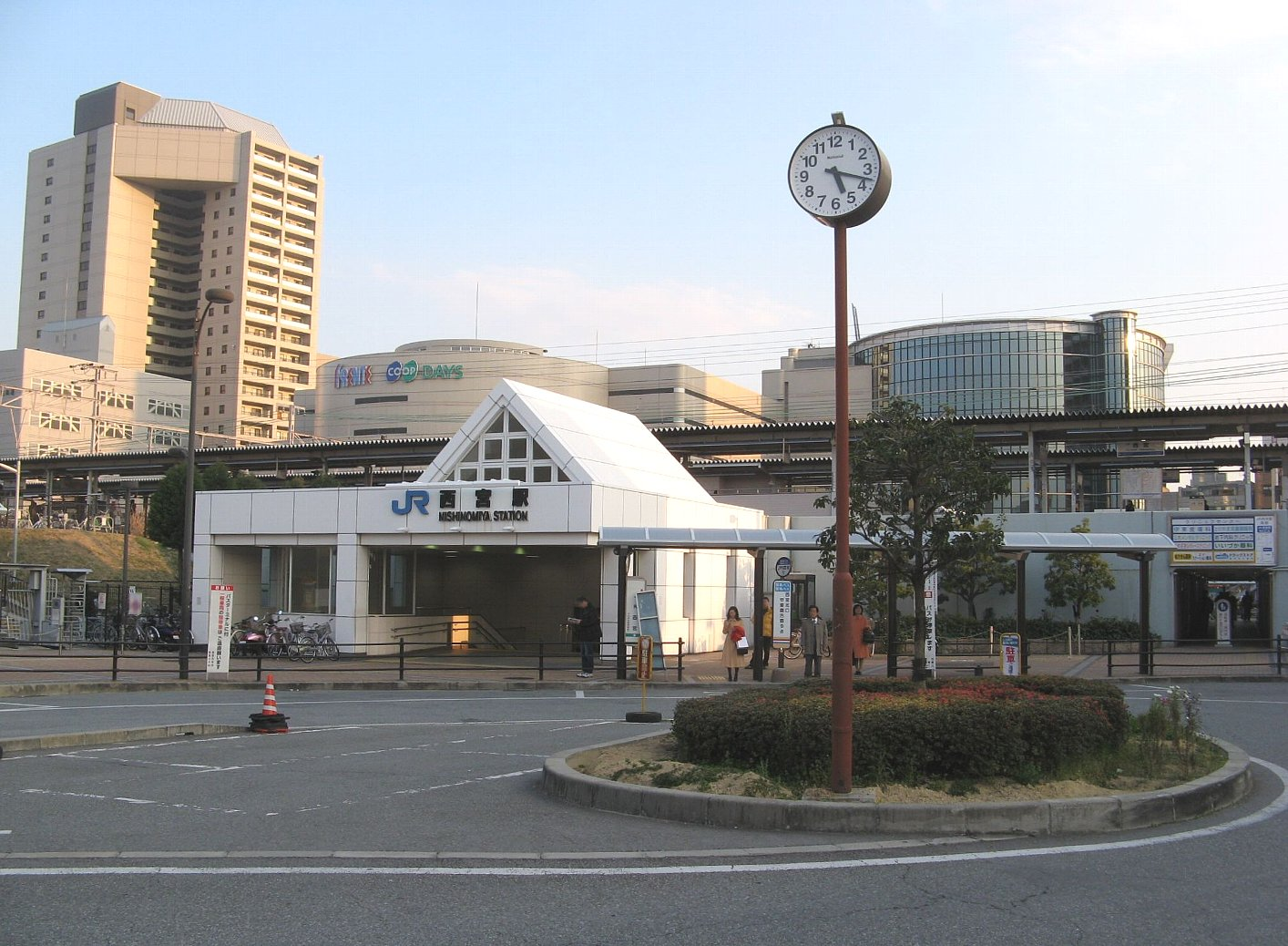
- North entrance

General information
- Location: 9-3, Ikedacho, Nishinomiya-shi, Hyōgo-ken 661-0025; Japan
- Coordinates: 34°44′20.3″N 135°20′52.3″E
- Owner: West Japan Railway Company
- Operator: West Japan Railway Company
- Line: Tōkaidō Main Line (JR Kobe Line)
- Distance: 571.8 km (355.3 miles) from Tokyo
- Platforms: 2 island platforms
- Connections: Bus terminal

Construction
- Structure type: Elevated
- Accessible: Yes

Other information
- Status: Staffed (Midori no Madoguchi)
- Station code: JR-A52
- Website: Official website

History
- Opened: 11 May 1874

Passengers
- FY 2023: 36,524 daily
Location
- Location within Hyōgo Prefecture Location within Japan

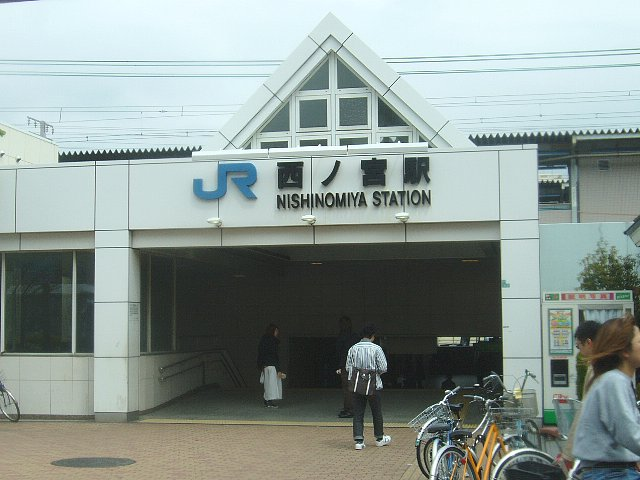
South entrance (prior to Japanese name change)

Nishinomiya Station (西宮駅, Nishinomiya-eki) is a passenger railway station located in the city of Nishinomiya, Hyōgo Prefecture, Japan. It is operated by the West Japan Railway Company (JR West). As a part of the JR West Urban Network, the following cards are accepted: J-Thru Card, ICOCA, Suica, Pasmo, and PiTaPa.

== Name ==
From 1874, when passenger service began at Nishinomiya Station, the station's name was written "西ノ宮", and included the katakana character "ノ" (no), which was not part of the city's name (西宮), to indicate the correct pronunciation of the station name. For many years, the city had requested for the character "ノ" to be removed from the station's title to match the city's name. On March 18, 2007, in coordination with the opening of Sakura Shukugawa Station, the station's Japanese name was renamed to simply 西宮駅 without the character "ノ".

== Lines ==
Nishinomiya Station is served by the Tōkaidō Main Line (JR Kobe Line), and is located 571.8 kilometers from the terminus of the line at Tokyo and 15.4 kilometers from Osaka.

== Layout and design ==
=== Station Placement ===
The section of the JR Kobe Line on which Nishinomiya is located runs on four tracks, meaning that there are two tracks for each direction. Similar to other nearby stations such as Sannomiya Station, Nishinomiya Station is of the island platform type, with two above-ground platforms which service four tracks. The inner tracks, Nos. 2 and 3, are for Local and Rapid Service trains, which do stop at this station. On the outside tracks, Tracks No. 1 and 4, Special Rapid Service and Limited Express trains pass through the station without stopping.

=== Gates ===
The station has two entrances that lead to an integrated ticket gate. The entrances are located on the north and south sides of the station. The gate is located one flight down from ground level. After passing through the gate, a passenger must take the stairs, escalator or elevator up to the platform.

=== Ticket office ===
The station has a Midori-no-Madoguchi, the JR ticket office equipped with MARS terminals. It is open everyday from 05:30 until 23:00.

=== Platforms ===
1	■ JR Kobe Line	rapid services for Sannomiya and Himeji
2	■ JR Kobe Line	local trains and rapid services for Sannomiya and Himeji
3	■ JR Kobe Line	local and rapid services for Amagasaki, Ōsaka, Kyōto and Kitashinchi
4	■ JR Kobe Line	part of rapid services for Amagasaki, Ōsaka and Kyōto in the morning

During rush hour, Track Nos. 1 and 4 are used for Rapid Service, while Local trains stop at Track Nos. 2 and 3. This allows people to transfer quickly from Local to Rapid Service trains, and allows the Rapid Service trains to pass ahead of the Local trains, which operate on the same track, unlike the Special Rapid Service and Limited Express trains. During the afternoon and night hours, when there is less traffic, Rapid Service trains stop at Track Nos. 2 and 3 only, and Track Nos. 1 and 4 are roped off as they used only for trains passing through this station without stopping.

Nishinomiya Station also has two short spurs that allow non-passenger trains (e.g. freight or maintenance) to stop and allow other traffic to pass.

== Adjacent stations ==
«	Service	»
JR Kōbe Line (Tōkaidō Main Line)
Kōshienguchi (JR-A51)	Local	Sakura Shukugawa (JR-A53)
Amagasaki (JR-A49)	Rapid Service	Ashiya (JR-A54)
Special Rapid Service: Does not stop at this station
Hanshin Railway Mukogawa Line (freight only) (suspended in 1958, abandoned in 1970)
Terminus	-	Muko-ohashi

== History ==
=== Timeline ===
- 11 May 1874 - Station opens for passenger service with the name 西ノ宮駅 at the same time rail service begins between Osaka Station and Kobe Station.
- 15 November 1944 - Hanshin Mukogawa Line operating between Nishinomiya Station and Suzaki Station begins freight service.
- 1958 - Hanshin Mukogawa Line between Nishinomiya Station and Suzaki Station ceases operation. Later, in 1970, the rail line was pulled up.
- 1 November 1986 - Freight handling ceases.
  - East of Nishinomiya Station is the Asahi Beer Nishinomiya Brewery and even further east is Sumitomo Cement Service Station. There was a private line running to both of these places which handled freight.
- 1 April 1987 - With the breaking up of Japanese National Railways into separate individual business units, Nishinomiya Station began operating under the West Japan Railway Company.
- 1 December 2003 - Rapid Service trains begin continuous service to Nishinomiya Station. Until this time, Rapid Service trains only stopped during morning and evening rush hour.
- 18 March 2007 - Station renamed 西宮駅 in coordination with the opening of Sakura Shukugawa Station.
- March 2018 - Station numbering was introduced with Nishinomiya being assigned station number JR-A52.

=== Beginning ===
Originally built around Nishinomiya Jinja as an inn town for travelers going further west and for those going to the east and central parts of Japan, beginning in the Edo period, Nishinomiya flourished as an important trading port and fishing harbor, and because the population was large, a train station was placed there. Originally, it is said, that a Katakana character "ノ" was inserted into the station's name in accordance with the policy of the government railway because people from Tokyo could not read the names correctly. In the same way, a "ノ" was inserted to the name of JR Sannomiya Station (三ノ宮駅), which opened on the same day as Nishinomiya Station. However, truth behind this is not clearly known. The national railways later scrapped this naming method; for example, it named Nishinomiya Najio Station on the Fukuchiyama Line without a "ノ" in 1986.

Unlike Hanshin Electric Railway, which was built after the opening of JR Nishinomiya and ran directly between Osaka and Kobe, at the time passenger service began, JR Nishinomiya Station was built away from the city's center in a slightly agricultural area. The rail that passed through divided the city north and south, it is said that this caused the flow of people to begin moving east and west.

=== Competitor stations ===
Later, after the construction of the Tōkaidō Main Line through to Kobe, Hanshin Electric Railway and Hankyu Railway each built their own lines connecting Osaka to Kobe. In the same area as JR Nishinomiya Station, Hanshin Nishinomiya Station and Hankyū Nishinomiya-Kitaguchi Station were built, which decentralized rail service in Nishinomiya, and provided customers other rail service options.

In 1934, the government railways built Kōshienguchi Station adjacent to Nishinomiya Station. The number of passengers using Kōshienguchi Station quickly exceeded that of Nishinomiya Station. During era of Japanese National Railways, that number was approximately double.

=== Rapid service ===
In 1957, a study was conducted to find a station that would be suitable as a Rapid Service stop. An argument unfolded between the adjacent Ashiya Station and Nishinomiya Station. In the end, it was decided that Rapid Service trains running on the inner tracks of the four track line, the Local service tracks, would stop at Ashiya Station. The Rapid Service trains operating on the two outer tracks would stop at Nishinomiya Station. However, in 2003, it was decided that all Local and Rapid Service trains would stop at both stations.

With the area around the station quickly becoming developed, and with the aforementioned fact that all Rapid Service trains stop at Nishinomiya Station, the difference between the number of passengers using Nishinomiya Station and Kōshienguchi Station suddenly began shrinking.

=== Renaming ===
On March 18, 2007, in coordination with the beginning of passenger service at Sakura Shukugawa Station, at the request of the city, the station's Japanese name was renamed to simply 西宮駅 without the character "ノ", while the character "ノ" in the name of JR Sannomiya Station was retained.

=== Streetcar connection ===
From 1926 to 1975, on the Route 2, which passes in front of the station, there used to be an inner-city street car which shared the road with other vehicle traffic.

The closest street car stop to the Nishinomiya Station was named Nishinomiya Ekimae (西宮駅前).

=== Bus connection ===
After Hanshin Electric Railway ceased the street car service, the Amagasaki-Kobe Line of Hanshin Railway Bus replaced it. At the south exit to the station, a roundabout was built, and the Nishinomiya Ekimae bus stop was moved to this location and renamed to Kokudō JR Nishinomiya Eki Mae (国道JR西宮駅前). In addition, on the inside of the roundabout, another bus stop was established with the name JR Nishinomiya Ekimae (JR西宮駅前), allowing busses running in both directions to be able to line up outside the station at one place. In either case, both bus stops were called Nishinomiya Ekimae (西宮駅前), without the "ノ" even during the time when the station name itself was written with it.

== Passenger statistics ==
In fiscal 2020, the station was used by an average of 16,321 passengers daily

== Surrounding area ==
=== Inside the Station ===
- Daily-In

=== North Exit ===
- FamilyMart
- Nishinomiya Police Station
- Nishinomiya Shinmei Post Office

=== South Exit ===
- Route 2
- FamilyMart
- Frente Nishinomiya
- Nishinomiya Ekimae Post Office
- Nishinomiya Fire Station

== Bus routes ==
Bus connections are available at the bus stops on both sides of the station.

=== North exit ===
- Platform 1
  - Hankyu Bus
    - Nishinomiya City Route for Nishinomiya-Kitaguchi and Kōtōen
  - Hanshin Bus
    - Nishinomiya-Kitaguchi Route for Nishinomiya-Kitaguchi
    - Nishinomiya Yamate Loop for Koyoen
    - Jūrinji Loop for Jūrinji
- Platform 2
  - Hankyu Bus
    - Nishinomiya City Route for Nishinomiya City Hall, Hanshin Nishinomiya and Asanagicho
  - Hanshin Bus
    - Nishinomiya-Kitaguchi Route, Nishinomiya Yamate Loop, Jūrinji Loop for Hanshin Nishinomiya
- Platform 3
  - Hankyu Bus
    - Sakura Yamanami Bus for Nishinomiyaebisu Sakura Shukugawa, Hankyu Shukugawa, Arima Onsen, Ryutsu Center minami and Hankyu Bus Yamaguchi Office
- Platform 4
  - Hankyu Bus
    - Sakura Yamanami Bus for Nishinomiya-Kitaguchi

=== South exit ===
- Airport Limousine
  - Hankyu Bus, Hanshin Bus, Osaka Airport Transport, Kansai Airport Transportation Enterprise, Nankai Bus
    - for Kansai International Airport
- Platform 2
  - Hanshin Bus
    - Amagasaki Ashiya Route for Hanshin Amagasaki
    - Nishinomiya Amagasaki Route for Hanshin Koshien and Hanshin Amagasaki
    - Nishinomiya Danchi Route for Hanshin Koshien and Hamakoshien Danchi
    - Nishinomiya Hamate Route for Nishinomiya-Kitaguchi
- Platform 3
  - Hanshin Bus
    - Nishinomiya Hamate Route for Hanshin Nishinomiya and Marina Park
    - Amagasaki Ashiya Route for Hanshin Ashiya
