= Nishinomiya Station (Hanshin) =

Railway station in Nishinomiya, Hyōgo Prefecture, Japan

Nishinomiya Station 西宮駅
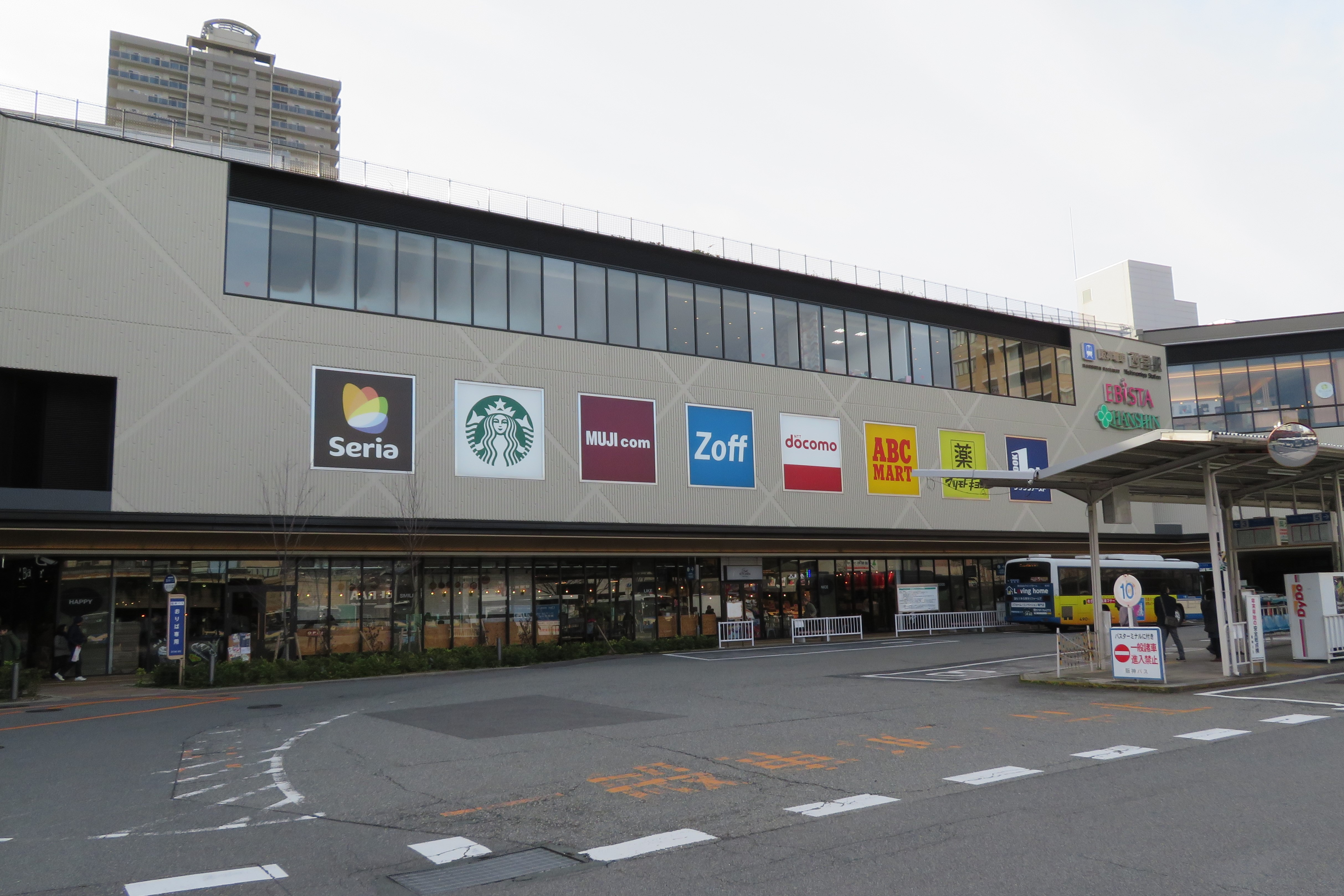
- Nishinomiya Station west entrance

General information
- Location: Tanakachō, Nishinomiya-shi, Hyōgo-ken 662-0973; Japan
- Coordinates: 34°44′12.68″N 135°20′17.67″E
- Operator: Hanshin Electric Railway
- Line: ■ Hanshin Main Line
- Distance: 16.7 km (10.4 miles) from Umeda
- Platforms: 2 island platforms
- Tracks: 4
- Connections: Bus terminal

Construction
- Structure type: Elevated

Other information
- Station code: HS 17
- Website: Official website

History
- Opened: April 12, 1905

Passengers
- 2019: 24,126 (daily)
Services
Hanshin Main Line (HS 17)
Imazu (HS 16)	Local	Kōroen (HS 18)
Imazu (HS 16)	Morning Express (Osaka-Umeda-bound trains only)	Ashiya (HS 20)
Imazu (HS 16)	Express	Ashiya (HS 20) (1 Mikage-bound train only on weekdays)
Kōshien (HS 14); Imazu (HS 16) (except weekday mornings/evenings)	Rapid Express	Ashiya (HS 20) (except weekends and holidays); Uozaki
Morning Limited Express (Osaka-Umeda-bound trains only on weekdays): Does not stop at this station
Kōshien (HS 14)	Limited Express	Ashiya (HS 20)
Amagasaki (HS 09); Kōshien (HS 14) (except 7 Osaka-Umeda-bound trains on weekday mornings)	Direct Limited Express A	Ashiya (HS 20)
Kōshien (HS 14)	Direct Limited Express B	Ashiya (HS 20)
Location
- Location within Hyōgo Prefecture Location within Japan

Nishinomiya Station (西宮駅, Nishinomiya eki; station number: HS-178) is a passenger railway station located in the city of Nishinomiya Hyōgo Prefecture, Japan. It is operated by the private transportation company Hanshin Electric Railway. The station is called "Hanshin Nishinomiya" or "Han-Nishi" to distinguish the name from Nishinomiya Station on the JR West Tōkaidō Line (JR Kōbe Line) and Nishinomiya-kitaguchi Station on Hankyu Railway.

== Lines ==
Nishinomiya Station is served by the Hanshin Main Line, and is located 16.7 kilometers from the terminus of the line at Umeda.

== Layout ==
Track map of Nishinomiya station. (left: for Osaka and Nara)

The station has two elevated island platforms serving four tracks. Two side tracks are located on the west side of the platforms and between two through tracks. The side tracks are used for express trains.

=== Platforms ===
1	■ Main Line	for Kōshien, Amagasaki, Osaka (Umeda), Namba, and Nara
2	■ ■■Main Line	for Kōshien, Amagasaki, Osaka (Umeda), Namba, and Nara
3	■ ■■Main Line	for Kobe (Sannomiya), Akashi, and Himeji
4	■ Main Line	for Kobe (Sannomiya), Akashi, and Himeji

== Gallery ==
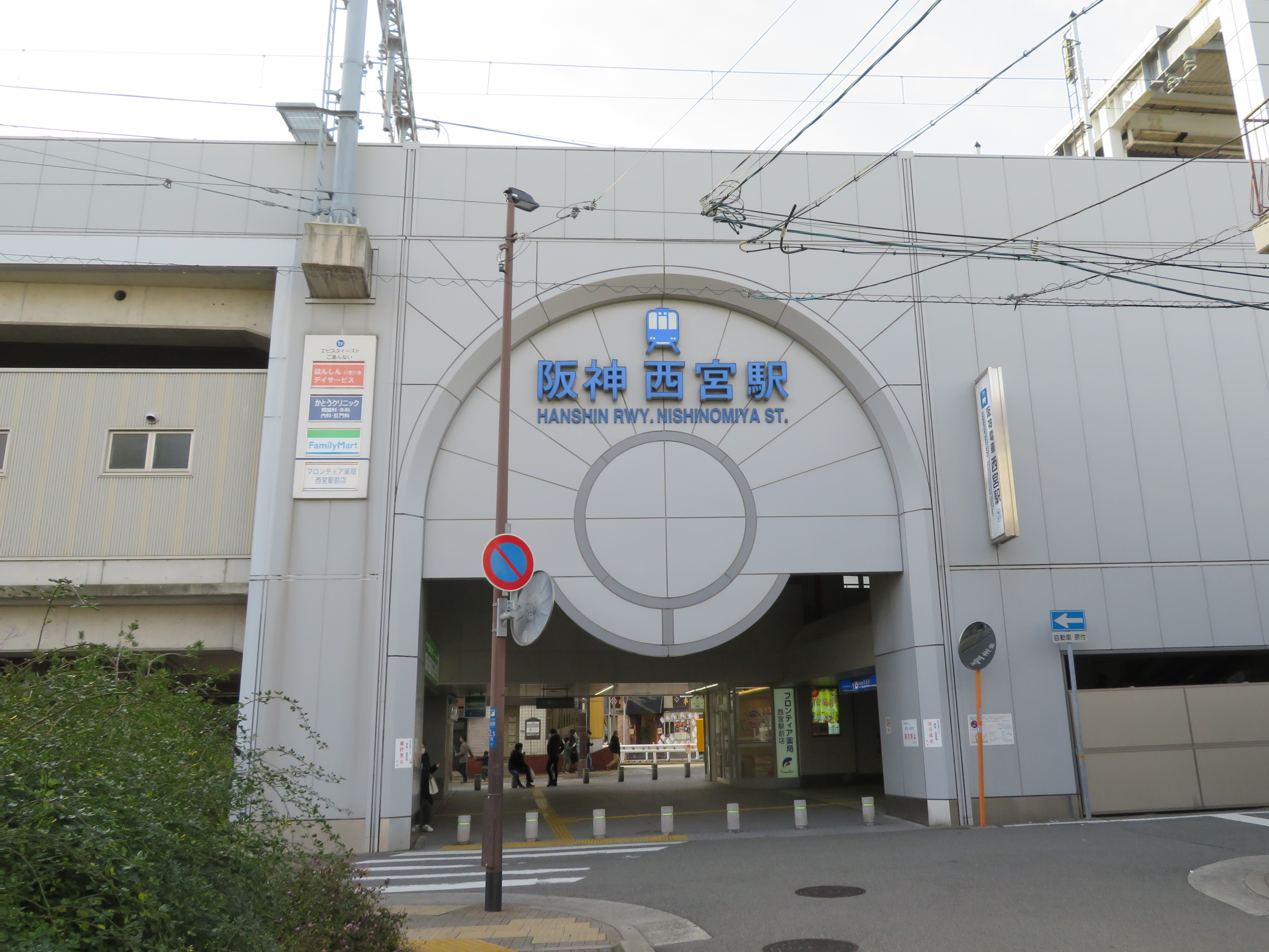
East exit towards Nishinomiya City Hall

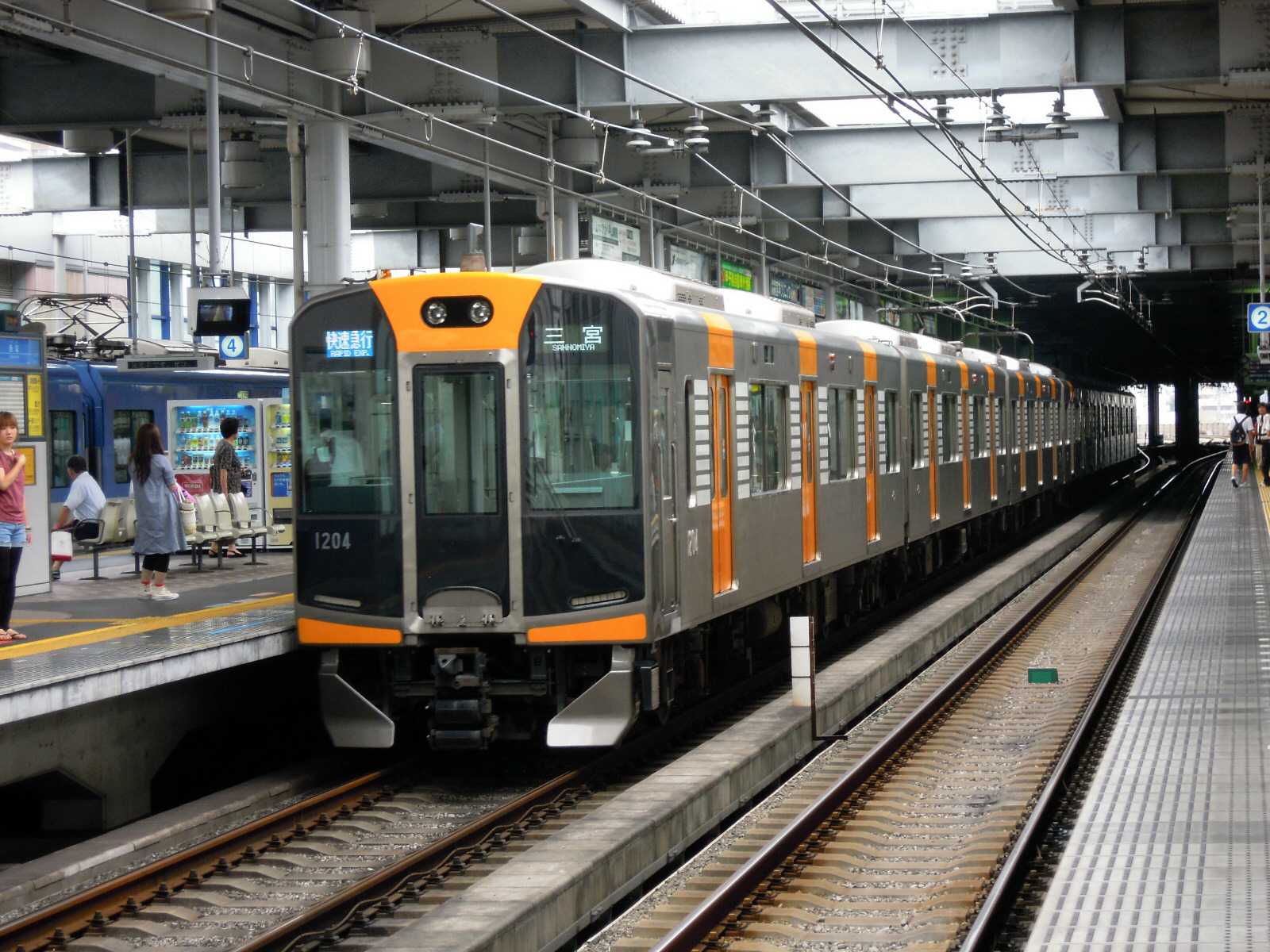
A westbound train waits at platform 3

== History ==
Nishinomiya Station on the Hanshin Main Line opened on 12 April 1905.

On 17 January 1995, the station was damaged by the Great Hanshin earthquake. Service in the affected area was restored by 26 June 1995.

Station numbering was introduced on 21 December 2013, with Nishinomiya being designated as station number HS-17.

== Passenger statistics ==
In fiscal 2019, the station was used by an average of 24,126 passengers daily

== Surrounding area ==
- Nishinomiya Shrine
- Ebista Nishinomiya (Hanshin Department Store, etc.)
- Nishinomiya City Hall
- Nishinomiya Hospital

== See also ==
- List of railway stations in Japan
