= Otomezuka Kofun =

- 処女塚古墳 (Japanese)
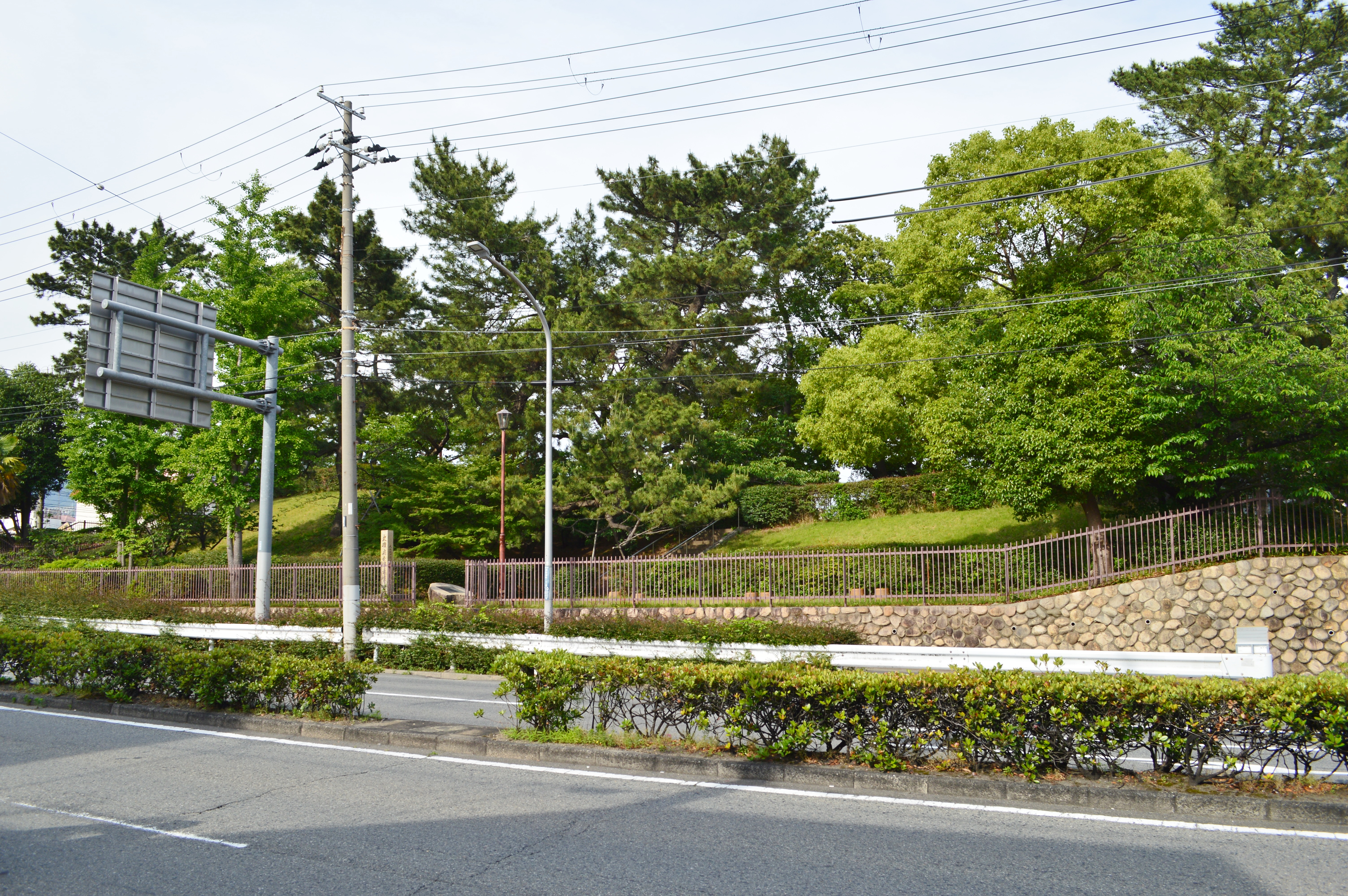
- Otomezuka Kofun

- Otomezuka Kofun Otomezuka Kofun (Japan)
- Interactive map of Otomezuka Kofun
- 34°42′40.92″N 135°14′50.59″E
- Type: Kofun
- Periods: Kofun period
- Location: Higashinada-ku, Kobe, Hyōgo Prefecture, Japan
- Region: Kansai region

History
- Built: c.late 3rd century

Site notes
- Public access: Yes (no facilities)

Otomezuka Kofun (処女塚古墳) is a Kofun period burial mound, located in the Mikagezuka neighborhood of Higashinada-ku, Kobe, Hyōgo Prefecture, in the Kansai region of Japan. The tumulus was designated a National Historic Site of Japan in 1922.

== Overview ==
The Otomezuka Kofun is a zenpō-kōhō-fun (前方後方墳), which is shaped like a keyhole, formed by two conjoined rectangles, when viewed from above. It is located on an alluvial fan formed by the Ishiyagawa River, and is one of the several early Kofun period burial mounds distributed on the coastal plain at the southern foot of Mount Rokkō. The total length of the tumulus, which had fukiishi its surface, is estimated to be about 70 meters after the restoration. It is believed to be the oldest burial mound at the southern foot of Mount Rokkō. The 100-meter Nishimotomezuka Kofun (西求女塚古墳) is about 2,000 meters west of this location, and the 80-meter Higashimotomezuka Kofun (東求女塚古墳) is about 1,500 meters to the east. From this positional arrangement, the Otomezuka Kofun has long been connected with the Unai-otomo Legend (菟原処女の伝説), which appears in the Man'yōshū and the Yamato Monogatari, a tragic love story in which a beautiful young maiden is distrait that two equally worthy suitors are fighting for her hand in marriage. Unable to choose between the two, she commits suicide and the two suitors both follow her into death.

Since 1979, the tumulus has been restored and maintained as a historic park. The tumulus is about a three-minute walk from Ishiyagawa Station on the Hanshin Electric Railway Hanshin Main Line.

== See also ==
- List of Historic Sites of Japan (Hyōgo)
