= Shinzaike Station =

Railway station in Kobe, Japan

Shinzaike Station 新在家駅
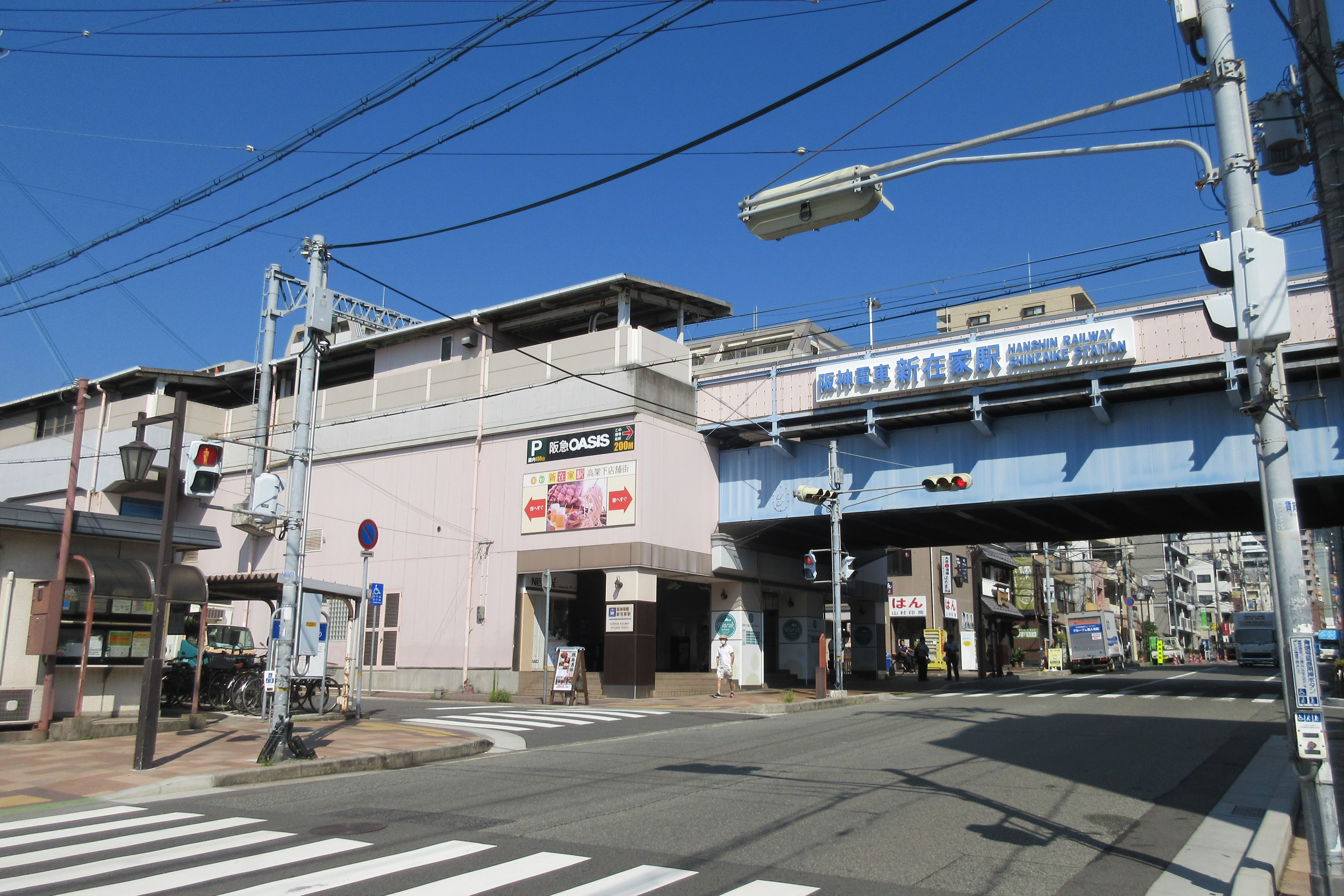
- Shinzaike Station

General information
- Location: Shinzaikekita-machi 1-chōme, Nada, Kobe, Hyōgo （神戸市灘区新在家北町一丁目） Japan
- Coordinates: 34°42′38″N 135°14′26″E
- Operator: Hanshin Electric Railway
- Line: Main Line
- Connections: Bus stop

Other information
- Station code: HS 27

History
- Opened: 1905
- Former names: Tōmyō (until 1930)

Passengers
- 2005: 8,466 daily

Services
Hanshin Main Line (HS 27)
| Ishiyagawa (HS 26) | Local | Ōishi (HS 28) |
Rapid Express: Does not stop at this station
Limited Express; Through Limited Express: Does not stop at this station
Location

Shinzaike Station (新在家駅, Shinzaike-eki) is a railway station in Nada-ku, Kobe, Hyōgo Prefecture, Japan.

== Overview ==
The station has two elevated side platforms serving two tracks.

=== Layout ===
| 1 | ■ Main Line | for Koshien, Amagasaki, Osaka (Umeda), Namba, and Nara |
| 2 | ■ Main Line | for Sannomiya, Kosoku Kobe, Akashi, and Himeji |

=== Surroundings ===
- Route 2 (国道2号) - Arterial route from Osaka to Fukuoka
- Nada Ward Kobe City Office (灘区役所)
- Kobe Rokko Bowl

==== Buses ====
===== Kobe City Bus =====
- "Hanshin Shinzaike" stop of Route 103 for JR Rokkomichi (JR六甲道) and Shogun Dori (将軍通り)

===== Hanshin Bus =====
- "Nada Kuyakusho Mae" stop for Hanshin Nishinomiya (阪神西宮) and Kobe Zeikan Mae (神戸税関前)

=== History ===
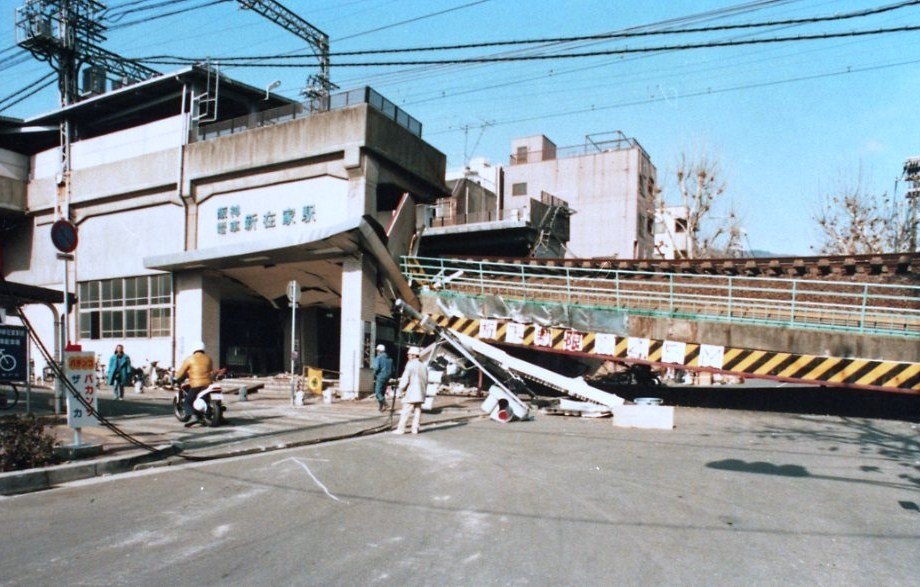
Damage after the Great Hanshin earthquake.

Shinzaike Station opened on the Hanshin Main Line on 12 April 1905 under a different name (Tōmyō station). It was renamed to its current name in 1930.

Service was suspended owing to the Great Hanshin earthquake in January 1995. Restoration work on the Hanshin Main Line took 7 months to complete.

Station numbering was introduced on 21 December 2013, with Shinzaike being designated as station number HS-27.

== Gallery ==
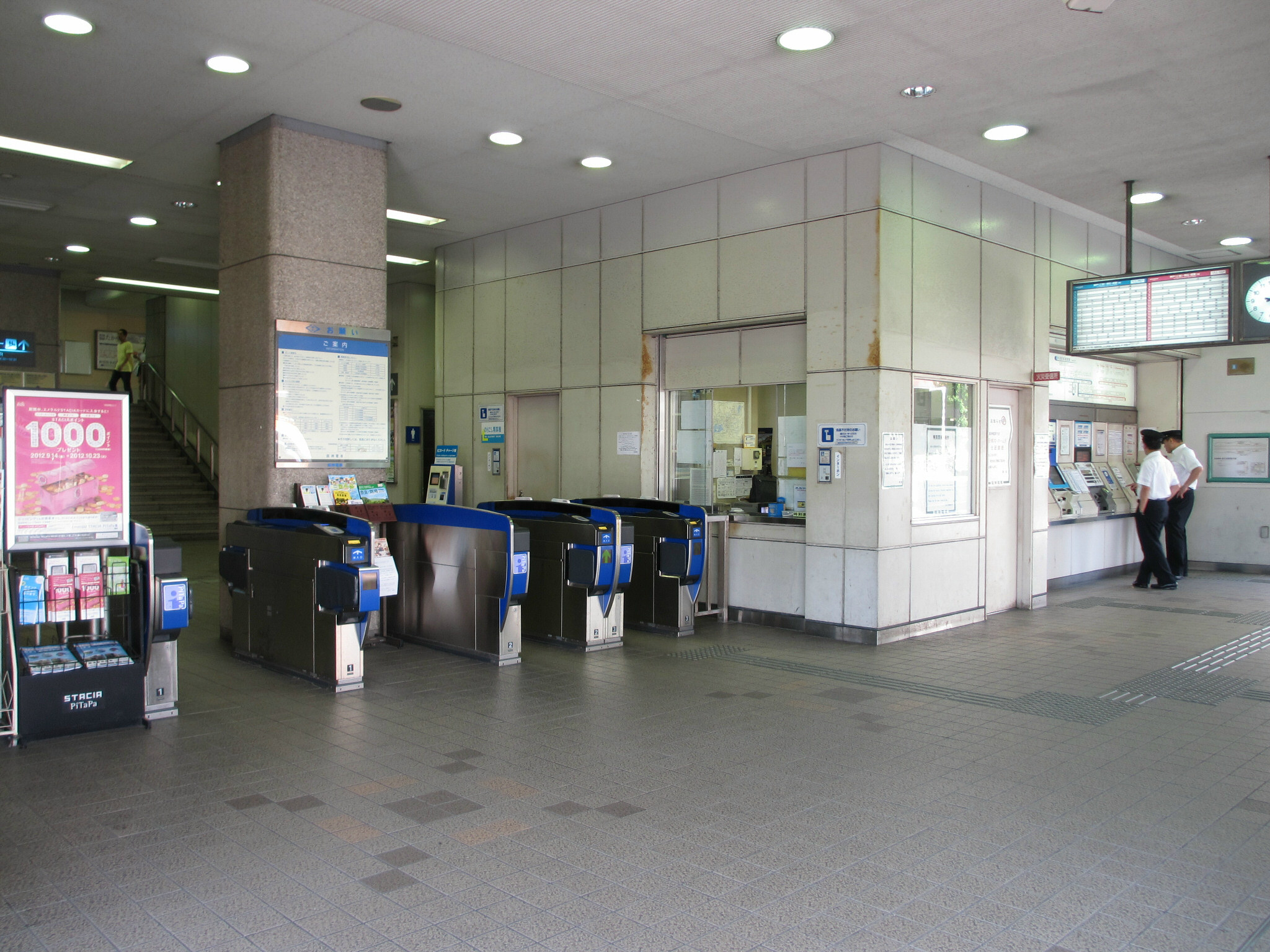
Faregate area

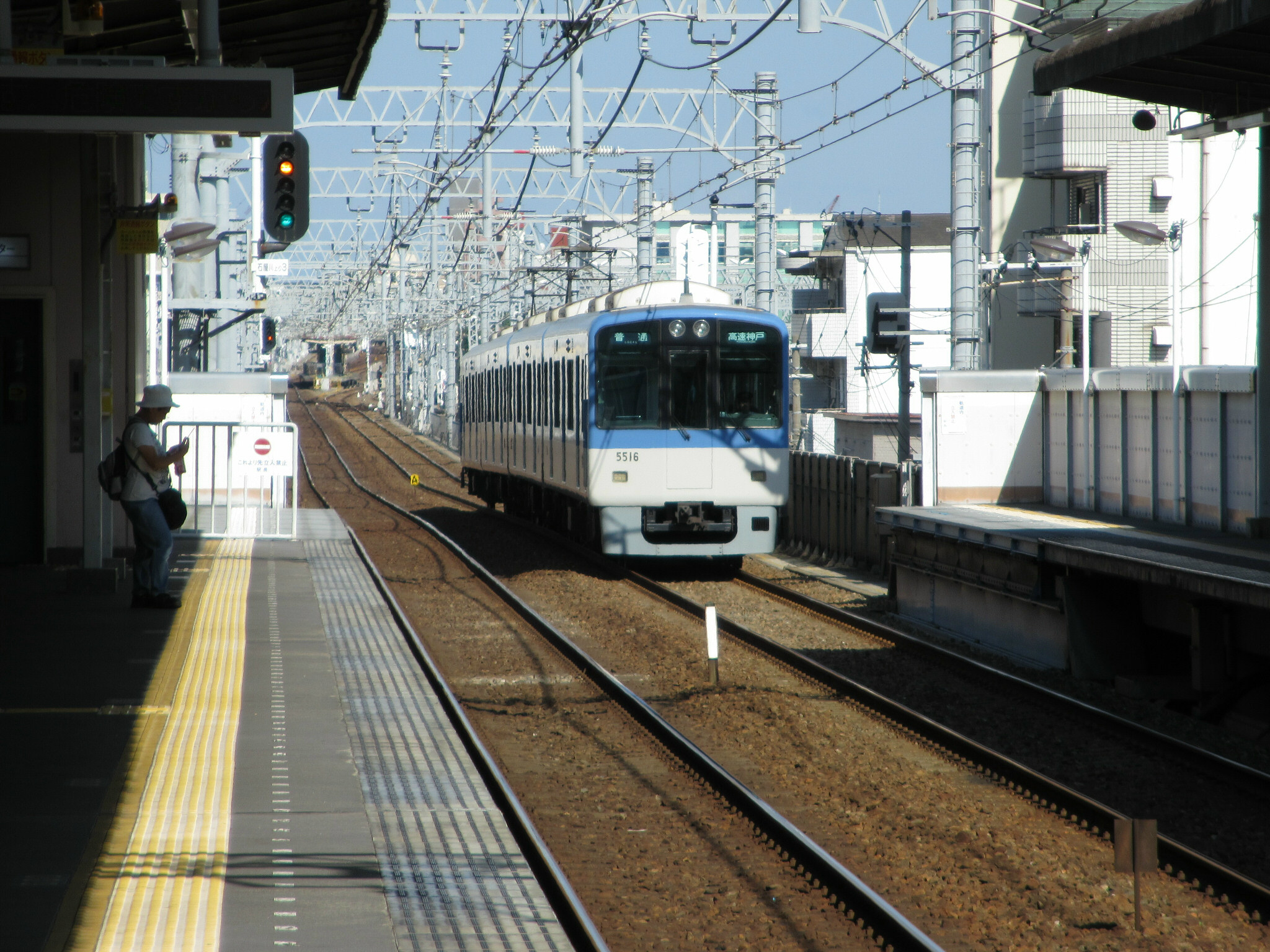
A local train entering the station on track 2
