= Moto-Inari Kofun =

Kofun period keyhole-shaped burial mound in Japan

Motoinari Kofun
- 元稲荷古墳 (Japanese)
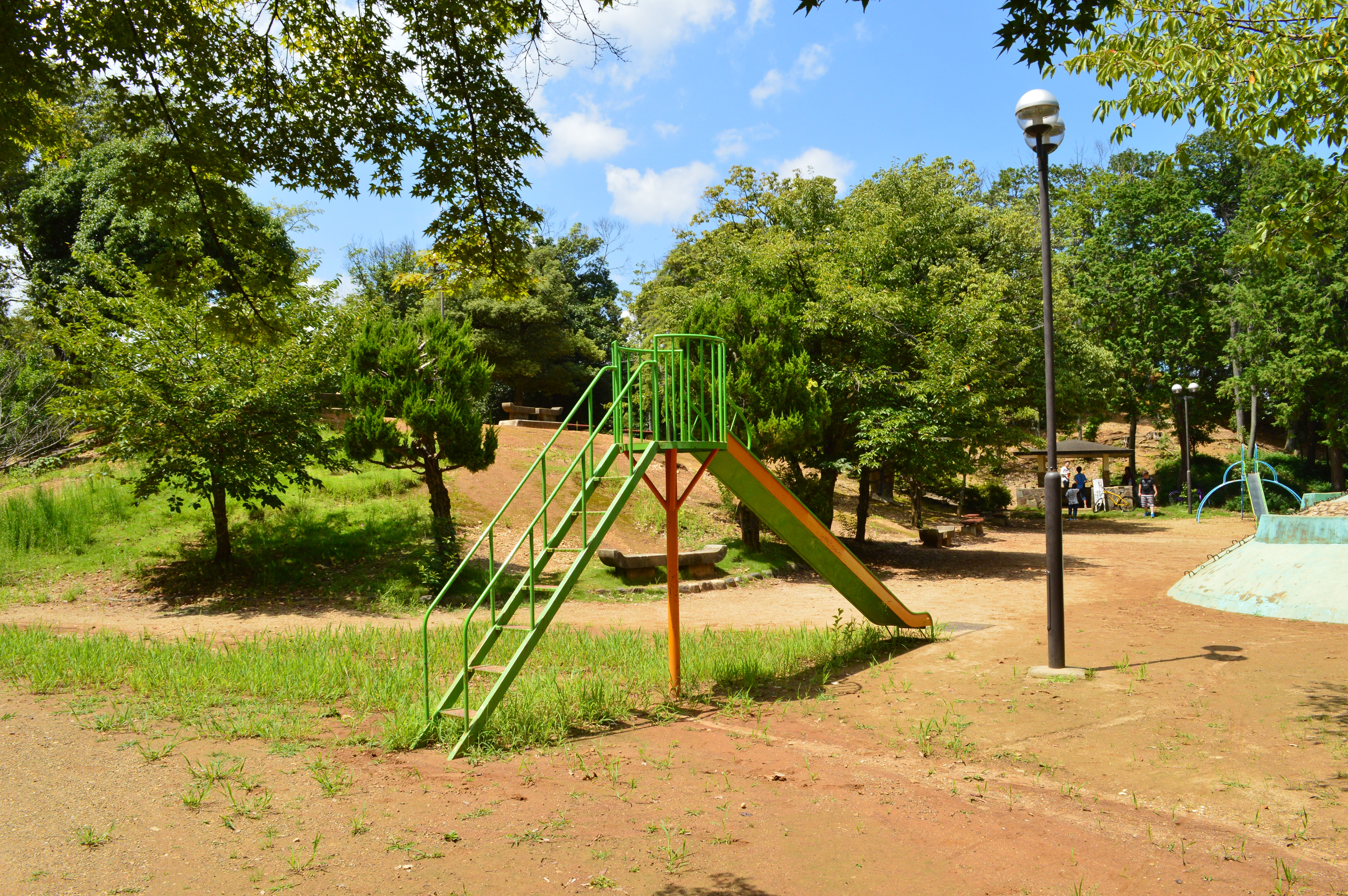
- Motoinari Kofun

- Motoinari Kofun Moto-Inari Kofun (Japan)
- 34°56′42.20″N 135°41′50.53″E
- Type: Kofun
- Periods: Kofun period
- Location: Mukō, Kyoto, Japan
- Region: Kansai region

History
- Built: c.3rd century

Site notes
- Public access: Yes (park)
- National Historic Site of Japan 京都府内の位置

Motoinari Kofun (元稲荷古墳) is a Kofun period keyhole-shaped burial mound, located in the Kitayama, Muko-cho neighborhood of Mukō, Kyoto in the Kansai region of Japan. The tumulus was designated a National Historic Site of Japan as a component of the Otokuni Kofun Cluster in 2016.

== Overview ==
The Motoinari Kofun is a zenpō-kohō-fun (前方後方墳), which is shaped like two co-joined rectangles, orientated to the south. It is located at the southernmost tip of the Muko Hills on the right bank of the Katsura River, on the southwestern edge of the Kyoto Basin. The tumulus borders the grounds of Muko Shrine, and the name "Motoinari" comes from the fact that an Inari shrine was once located on the top of the rear portion of the mound. This burial mound has been the victim of large-scale grave robberies during the Edo period. Since 1960, a total of ten archaeological excavations have been carried out on this burial mound. The mound is built in three tiers at the rear and two tiers at the front. Fukiishi roofing stones can be seen on the outside of the mound. The burial facility is a pit-type stone burial chamber built in the center of the posterior portion of the tumulus. The chamber's main axis runs north-south, parallel to the main axis of the mound. It measures 5.56 meters long, 1.32 meters wide at the north side and 1.02 meters wide at the south side, and 1.9 meters high at the southern end. The base is at the same height as the top of the front section. The floor is clay, with a rectangular platform topped by a layer of clay (painted red) and stone slabs. The walls are made of stone slabs, and the upper half is corbeled, with 11 ceiling stones. Although the burial chamber has been looted, excavations have found remains of grave goods, including one bronze and seven iron arrowheads, three fragments of an iron sword and three fragments of spears, an iron ax and a shard of Haji ware pottery. In addition, a cluster of haniwa shards and jar-shaped pottery fragments has been found in the center of the anterior portion of the tumulus.

The tumulus is estimated to have been built in the late 3rd century, during the early Kofun period. It is said to be of the same shape as the Nishimotomezuka Kofun (Kobe City, Hyogo Prefecture) among other kofun from the same period.

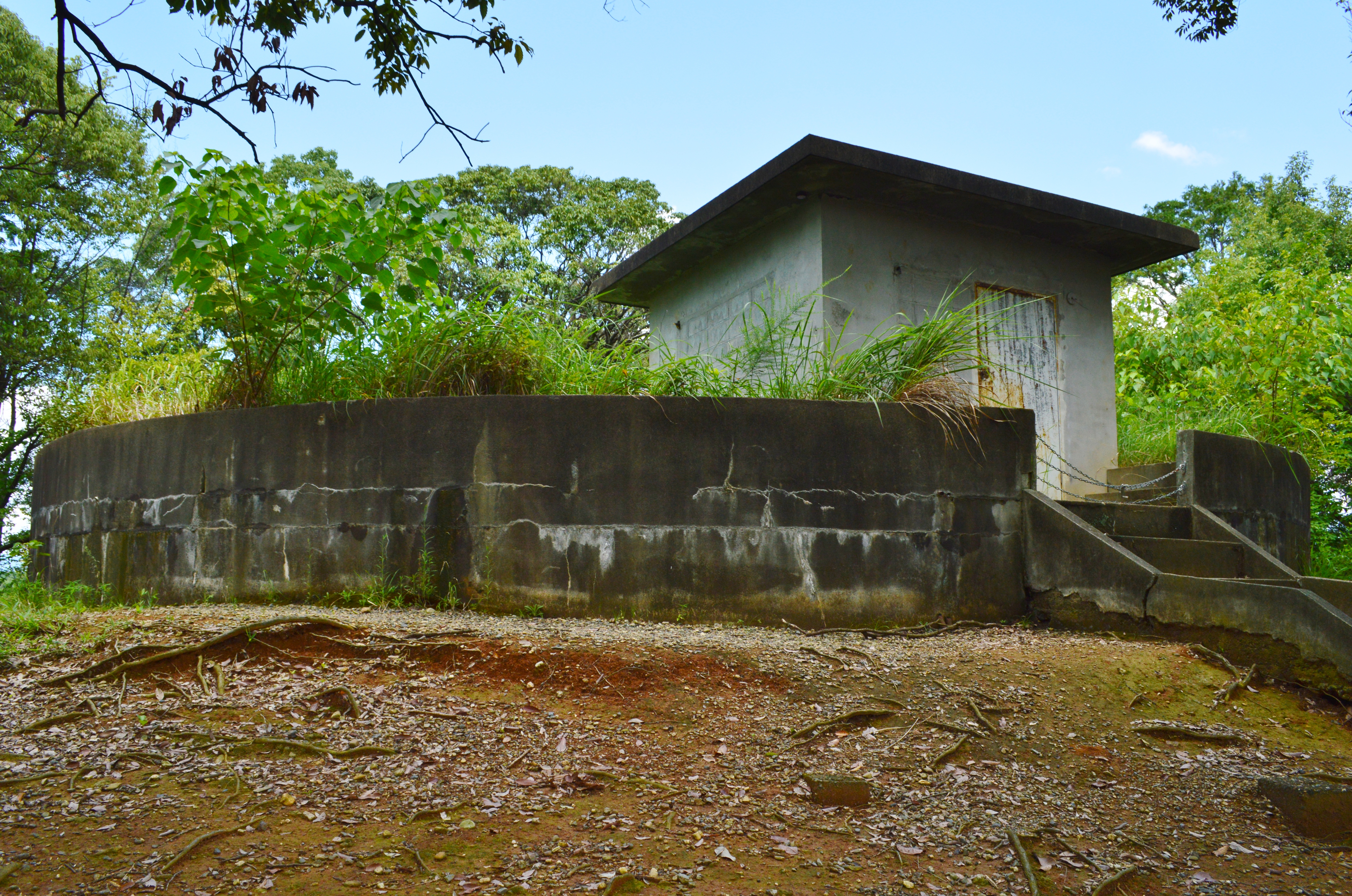
Posterior tumulus

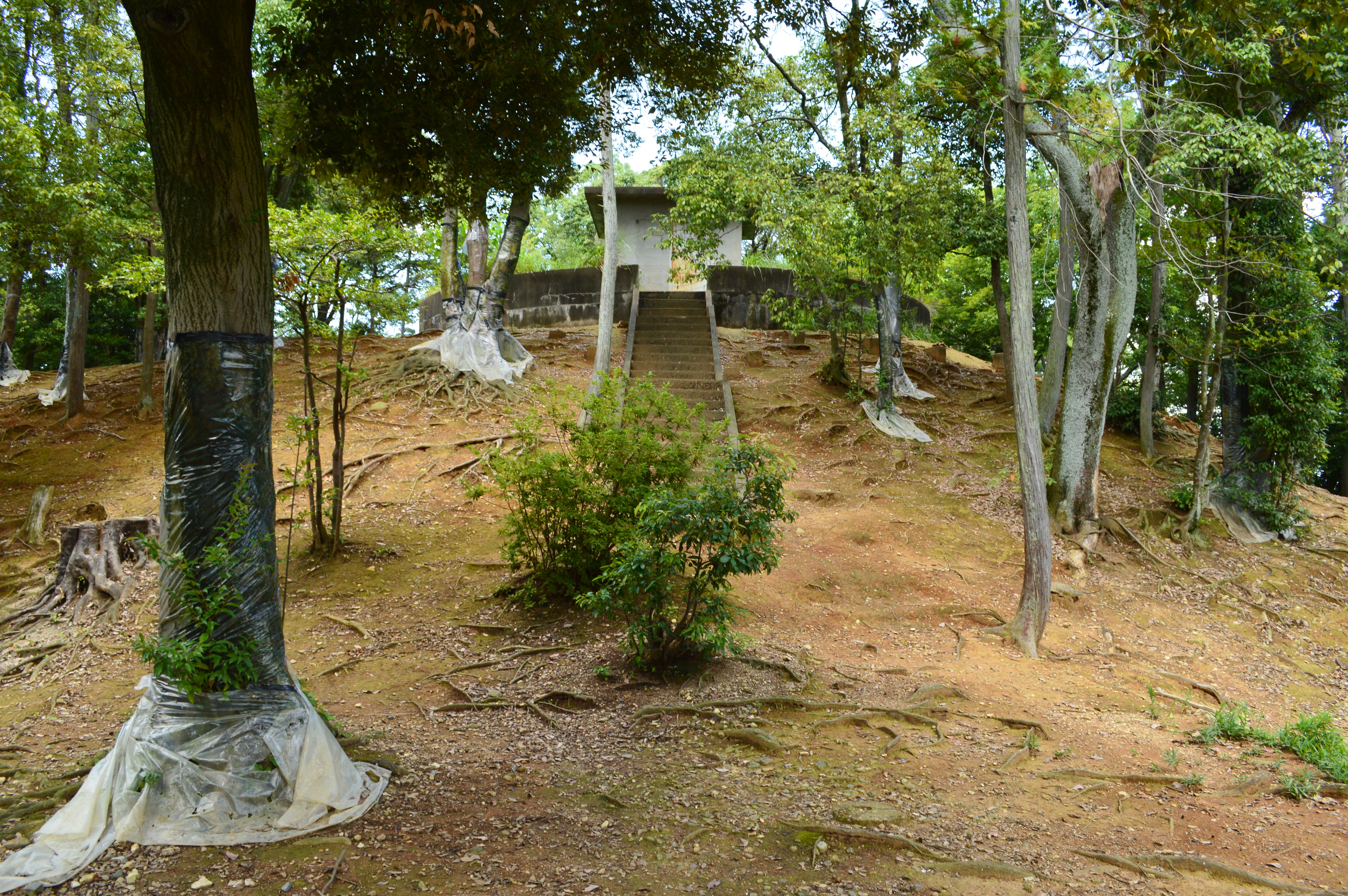
Posterior tumulus

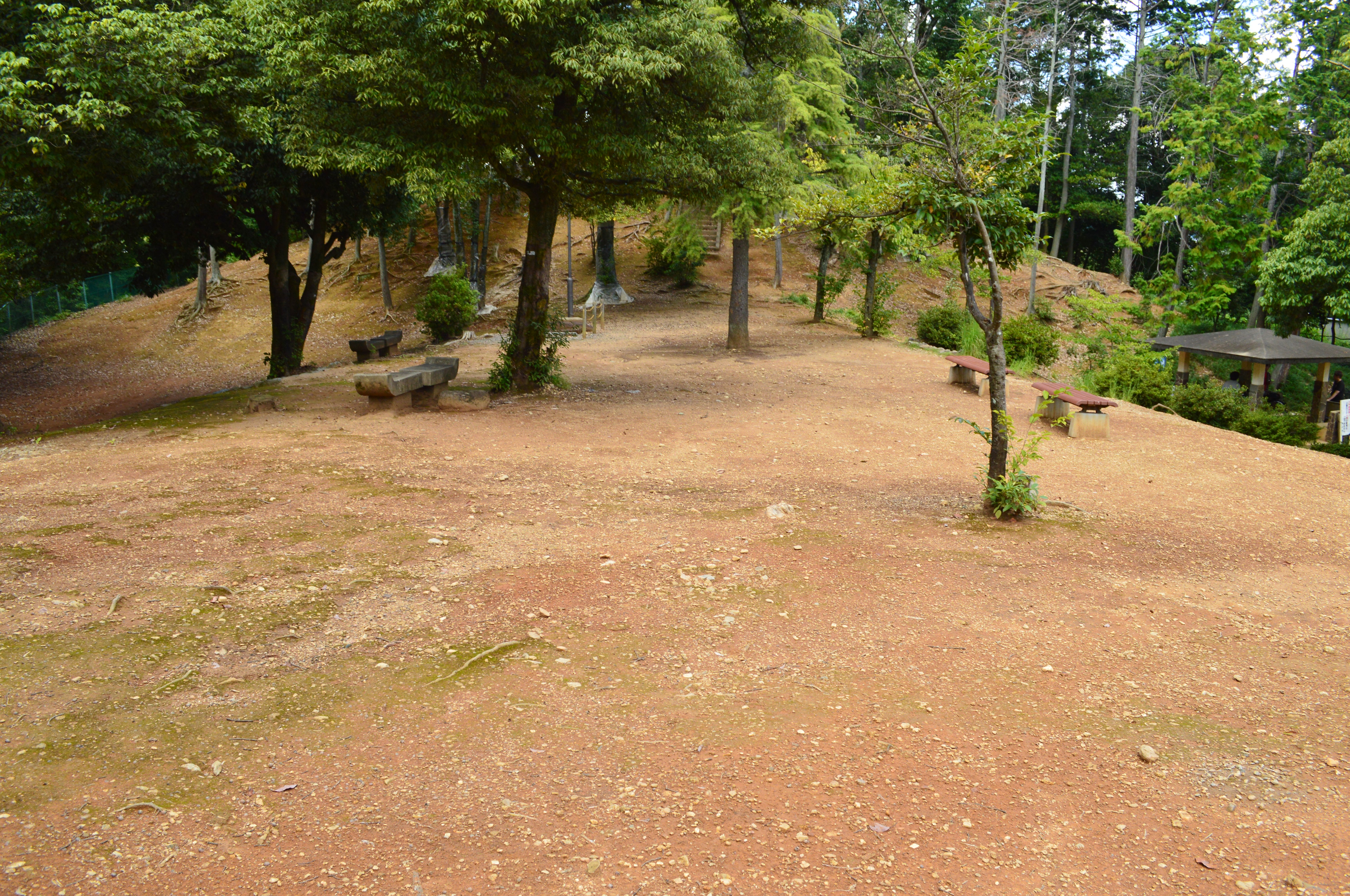
Posterior tumulus viewed from the front

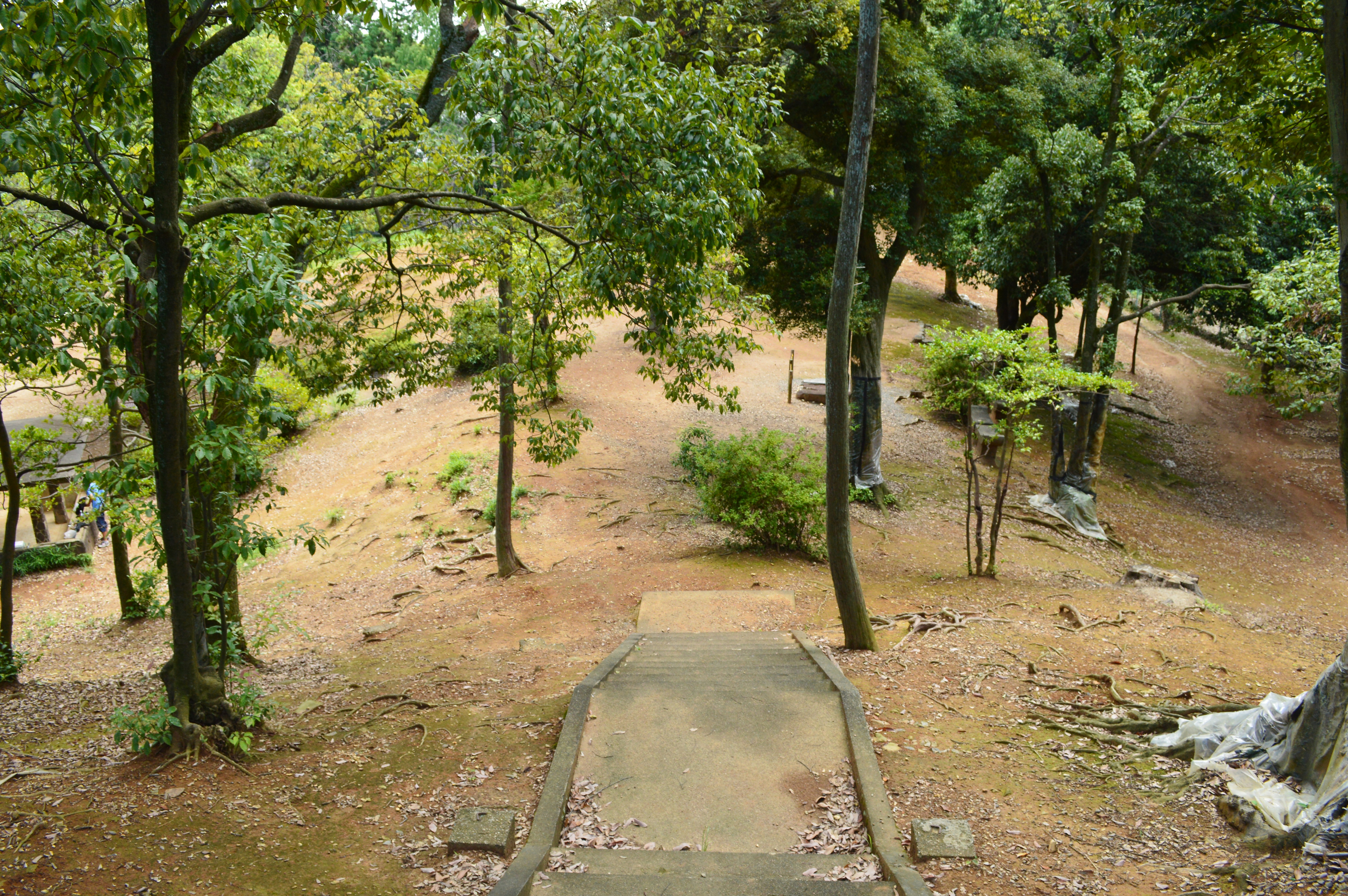
Anterior tumulus viewed from the rear

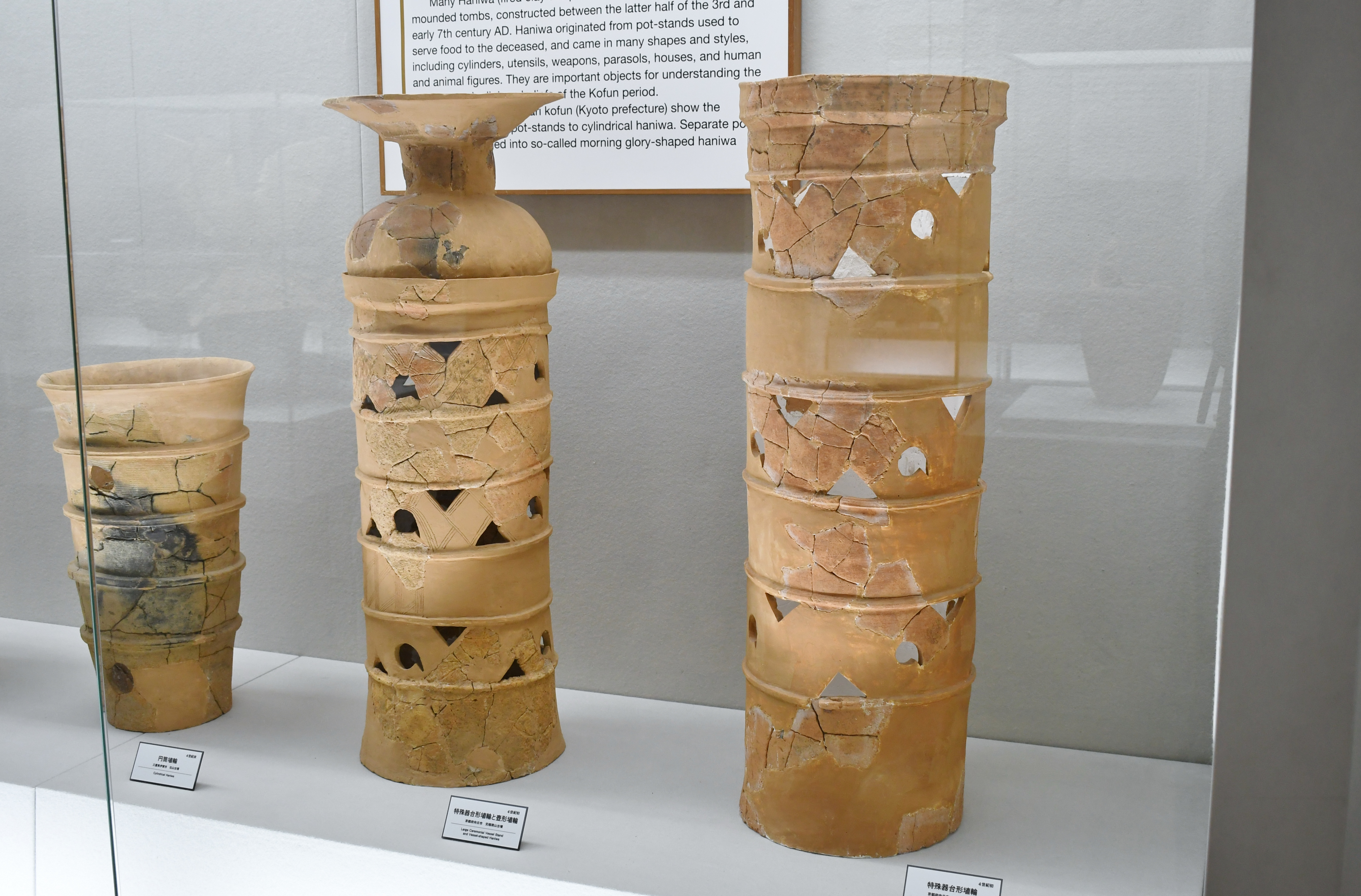
haniwa
Displayed at Kyoto University Museum.

The tumulus is about 1.1 kilometers northwest from Nishi-Mukō Station on the Hankyu Kyoto Line.

== See also ==
- List of Historic Sites of Japan (Kyoto)
