= Maya Station =

Railway station in Kobe, Japan

Maya Station 摩耶駅
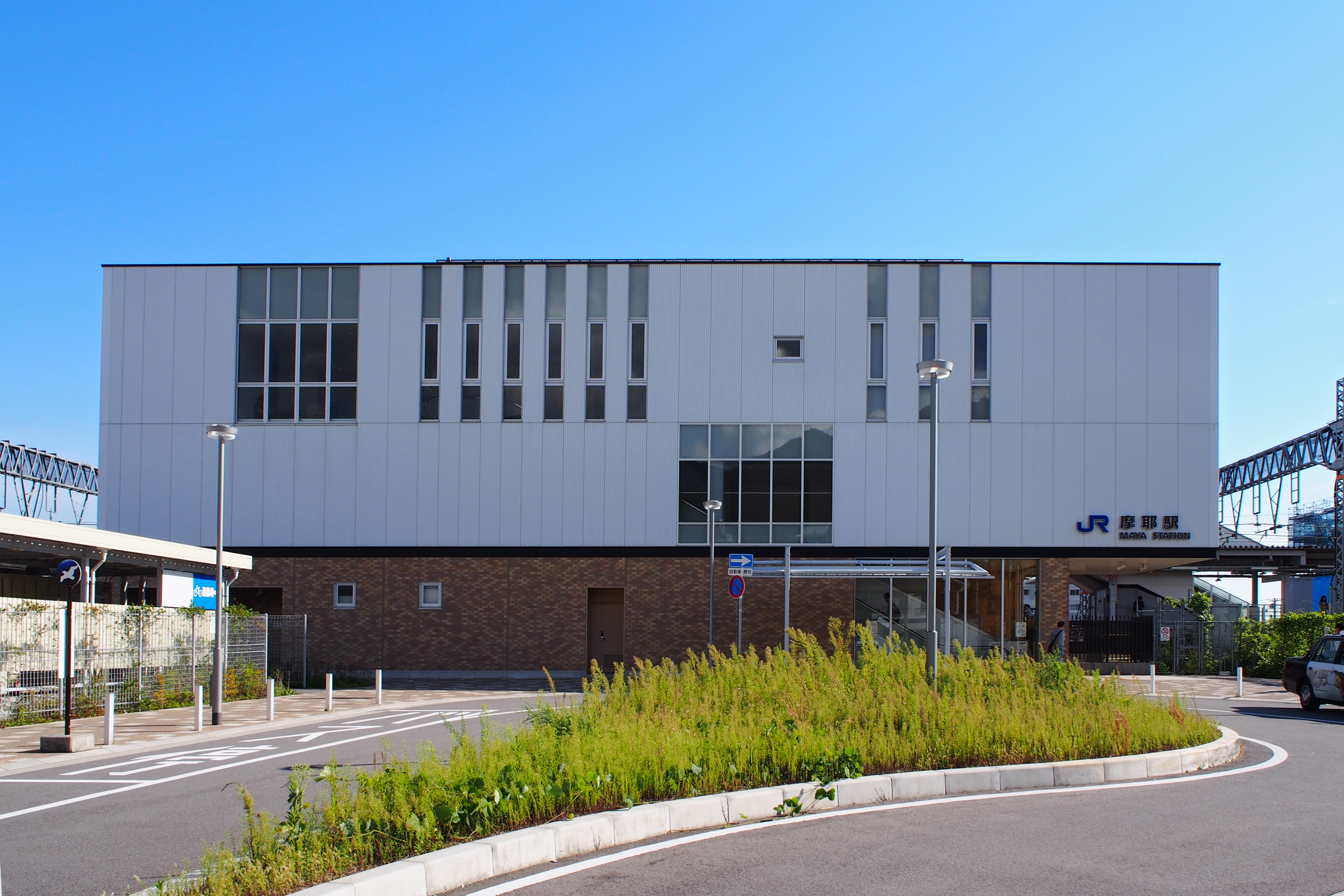
- The north side of the station in October 2018

General information
- Location: 5-5 Nadaminamidori, Nada-ku, Kobe-shi, Hyogo-ken 657-0841; Japan
- Coordinates: 34°42′31.2″N 135°13′30.6″E
- Owner: JR West
- Operator: JR West
- Line: Tōkaidō Main Line (JR Kobe Line)
- Distance: 583.7 km (362.7 miles) from Tokyo
- Platforms: 1 island platform
- Connections: Bus stop

Construction
- Structure type: Ground level
- Accessible: Yes

Other information
- Status: Staffed (Midori no Madoguchi )
- Station code: JR-A59
- Website: Official website

History
- Opened: 26 March 2016

Passengers
- FY 2023: 13,102 daily

Services
Preceding station	JR West	Following station
Nada towards Himeji	JR Kōbe Line Local	Rokkomichi towards Ōsaka
Location
- Location within Hyōgo Prefecture Location within Japan

Maya Station (摩耶駅, Maya-eki) is a passenger railway station located in Nada-ku, Kobe, Hyōgo Prefecture, Japan. It is operated by the West Japan Railway Company (JR West).

== Lines ==
Maya Station is served by the Tōkaidō Main Line (JR Kobe Line), and is located 583.7 kilometers from the terminus of the line at Tokyo and 27.3 km from Osaka Station. Only all-stations "Local" services stop at this station.

== Station layout ==
The station consists of one island platform an elevated station building. The station is staffed. The station has three elevators: one at each entrance and one providing access to the platforms. Similarly, three escalators are provided: one at each entrance and one for the platforms.

In addition to solar panels on the roof of the station, the station incorporates a system which converts electricity generated by trains when they brake to augment the station power supply, the first time such a system has been used by JR West.

=== Platforms ===
1	■ JR Kobe Line	for Osaka
2	■ JR Kobe Line	for Himeji

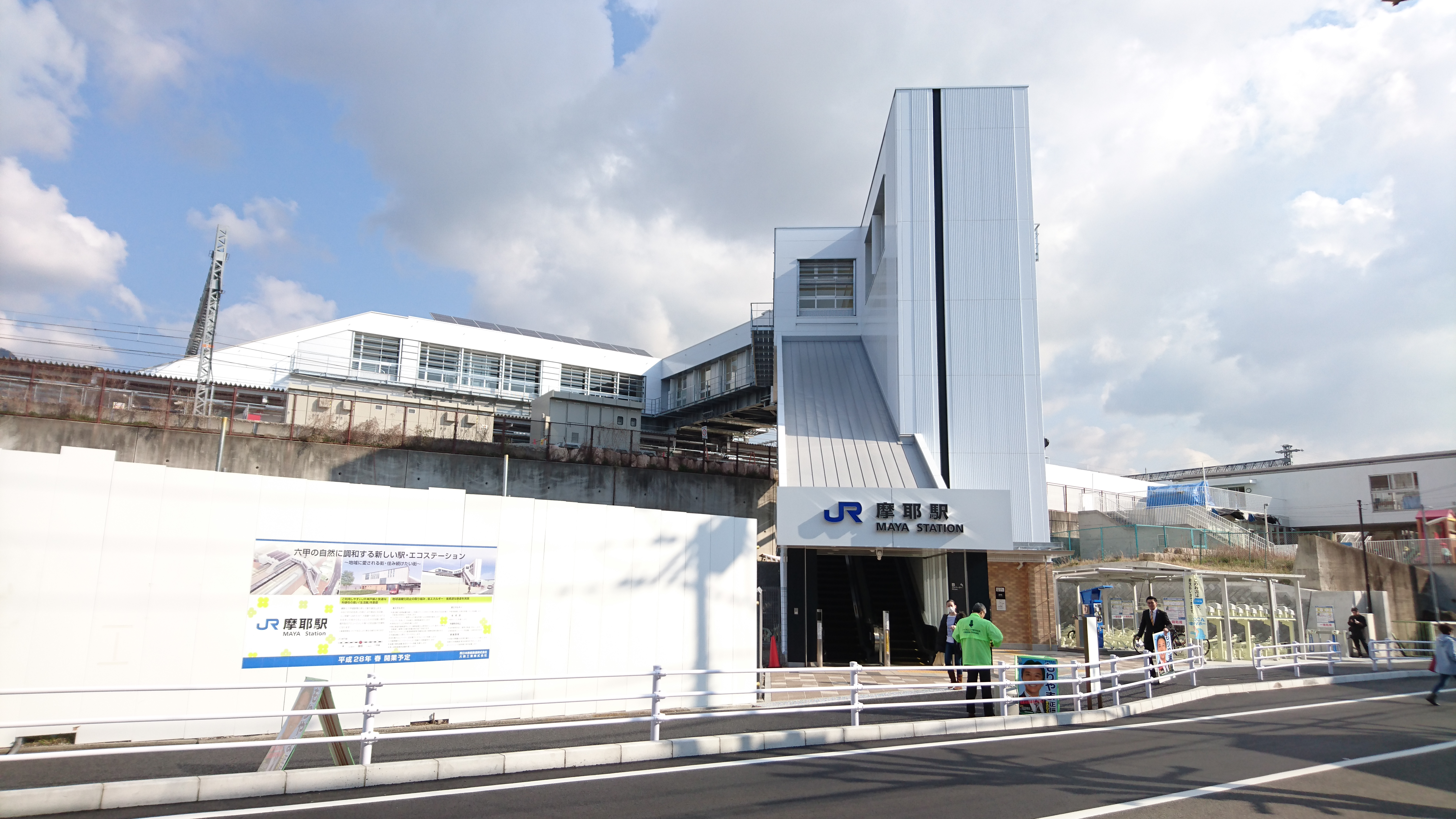
The north entrance in March 2016

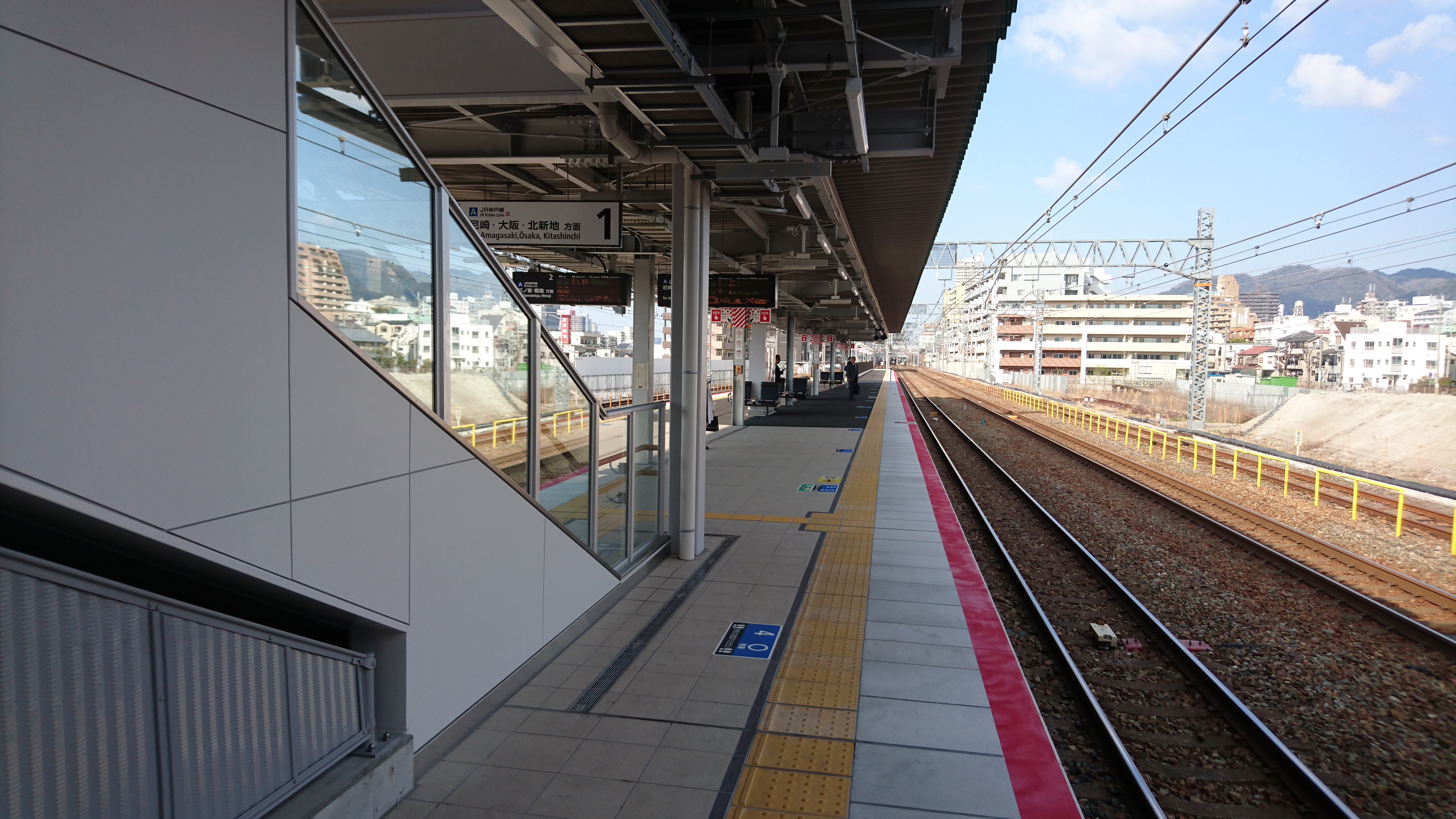
The platforms in March 2016

== History ==
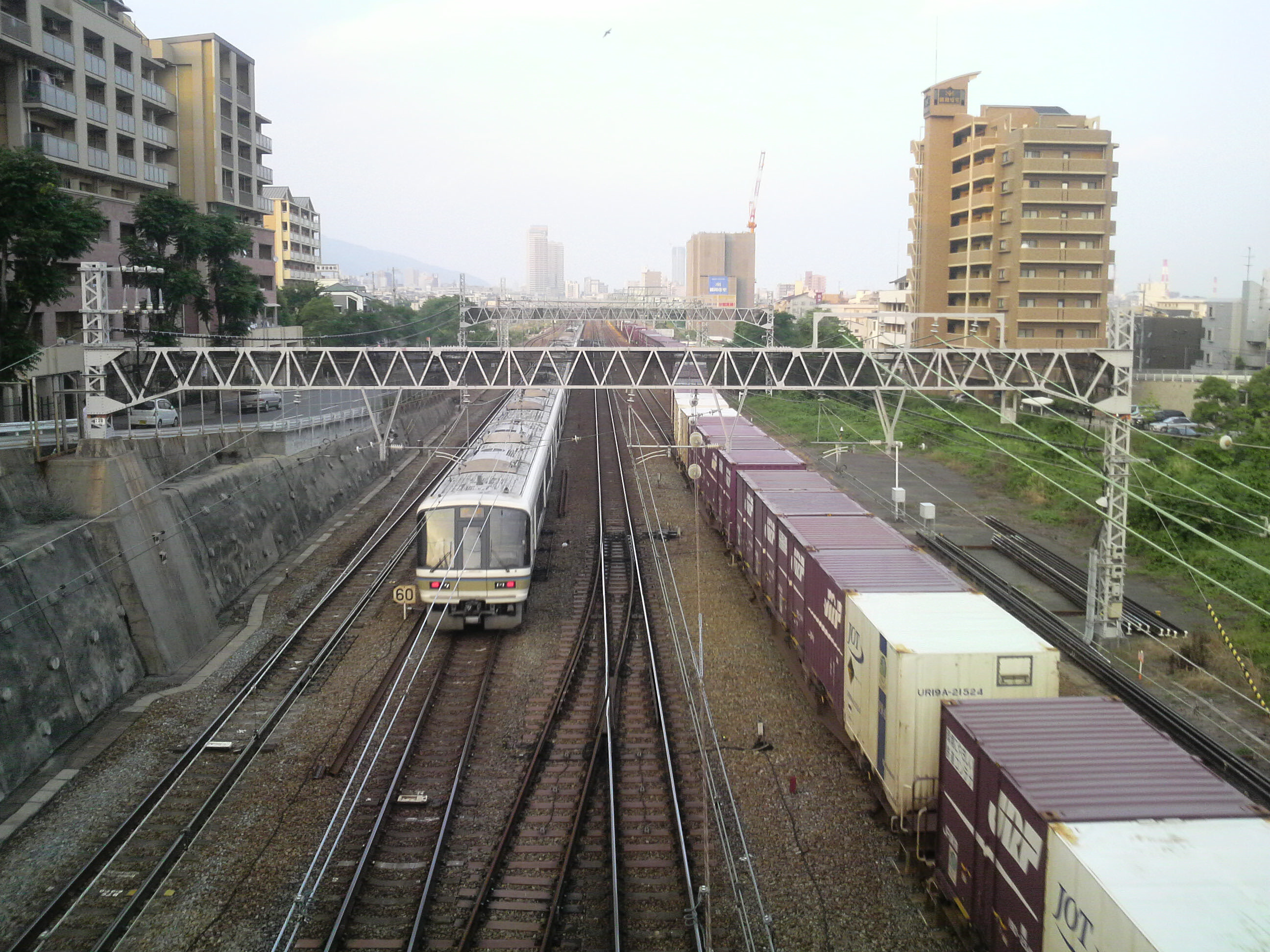
Higashi-Nada Yard on the site of what is now Maya Station in June 2009

Details of the new station were formally announced by JR West on 2 October 2015. The name is derived from the nearby Mount Maya, after which many local features are named. JR West bore virtually all of the total construction costs of JPY 4 billion. The station opened on 26 March 2016.

Station numbering was introduced in March 2018 with Maya being assigned station number JR-A59.

== Passenger statistics ==
In fiscal 2019, the station was used by an average of 5,785 passengers daily

== Surrounding area ==
- Nishinada Station (Hanshin Main Line)
- Ōishi Station (Hanshin Main Line)
- Ōji-kōen Station (Hankyu Kobe Main Line)
- Hanshin Expressway Route 3
- National Route 2
- Ōji Zoo
- Ōji Stadium

== See also ==
- List of railway stations in Japan
