= Iwaya Station =

Iwaya Station is the name of two train stations in Japan:

- Iwaya Station (Hyōgo)
- Iwaya Station (Saga)
