= Ishiyagawa Station =

Railway station in Kobe, Japan

Ishiyagawa Station 石屋川駅
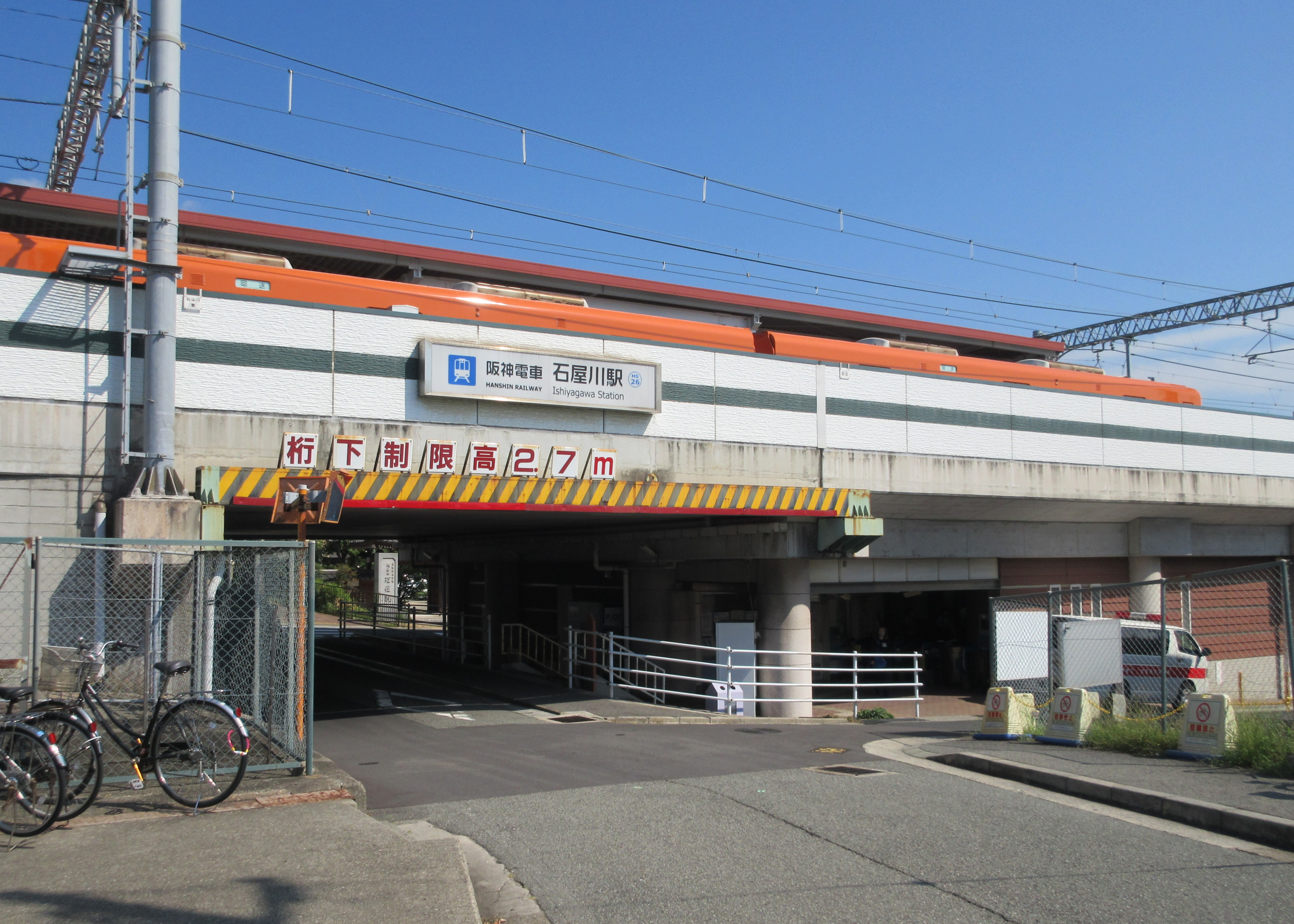
- Ishiyagawa Station

General information
- Location: Mikage Ishi-machi 2-chōme, Higashinada-ku, Kobe-shi, Hyōgo-ken 658-0045; Japan
- Coordinates: 34°42′48″N 135°14′59″E
- Operator: Hanshin Electric Railway
- Line: ■ Hanshin Main Line
- Distance: 26.6 km (16.5 miles) from Umeda
- Platforms: 1 island platform
- Connections

Other information
- Station code: HS 26
- Website: Official website

History
- Opened: April 12, 1905

Passengers
- FY2019: 6,838

Services
Hanshin Main Line (HS 26)
Mikage (HS 25)	Local	Shinzaike (HS 27)
Rapid Express: Does not stop at this station
Limited Express; Through Limited Express: Does not stop at this station
Location
- Location within Hyōgo Prefecture Location within Japan

Ishiyagawa Station (石屋川駅, Ishiyagawa-eki; station number: HS-26) is a passenger railway station located in Higashinada-ku, Kobe, Hyōgo Prefecture, Japan. It is operated by the private transportation company Hanshin Electric Railway.

== Lines ==
Ishiyagawa Station is served by the Hanshin Main Line, and is located 26.6 kilometers from the terminus of the line at Umeda.

== Layout ==
The station consists of one elevated island platform serving two tracks. Part of the platform crosses the Ishiya River. The effective length of the platform is 120 meters, which corresponds to a 19-meter-class Hanshin 6-car train. However, only 4-car trains stop at this station. The Ishiyagawa rail yard is located on the Sannomiya side of the station, and there is a crossover track. There is only one ticket gate on the ground level.

=== Platforms ===
1	■ Main Line	for Koshien, Amagasaki, Osaka (Umeda), Namba, and Nara
2	■ Main Line	for Sannomiya, Kosoku Kobe, Akashi, and Himeji

== History ==
Ishiyagawa Station opened on the Hanshin Main Line on 12 April 1905.

Service was suspended owing to the Great Hanshin earthquake in January 1995. Restoration work on the Hanshin Main Line took 7 months to complete. The station was reconstructed as an island platform station, instead of its previous two opposed side platform configuration.

Station numbering was introduced on 21 December 2013, with Ishiyagawa being designated as station number HS-26.

== Passenger statistics ==
In fiscal 2020, the station was used by an average of 6,838 passengers daily

== Surrounding area ==
- Route 2 (国道2号) - Arterial route from Osaka to Fukuoka
- Kobe Municipal Mikage Public Hall (神戸市立御影公会堂)
- A stage of Grave of the Fireflies (火垂るの墓の舞台)
- Ishiyagawa Park (石屋川公園)

=== Buses ===
Kobe City Bus

- "Mikage Kokaido Mae" stop of Route 16 for JR Rokkomichi (JR六甲道), Hankyu Rokko, Kobe University Faculty of Intercultural Studies (神大国際文化学部前), and Rokko Cable Car Station

Hanshin Bus

- "Kami Ishiya" stop for Hanshin Nishinomiya (阪神西宮) and Kobe Zeikan Mae (神戸税関前)

== See also ==
- List of railway stations in Japan
