= Kasuganomichi Station (Hanshin) =

Railway station in Kobe, Japan

Kasuganomichi Station 春日野道駅
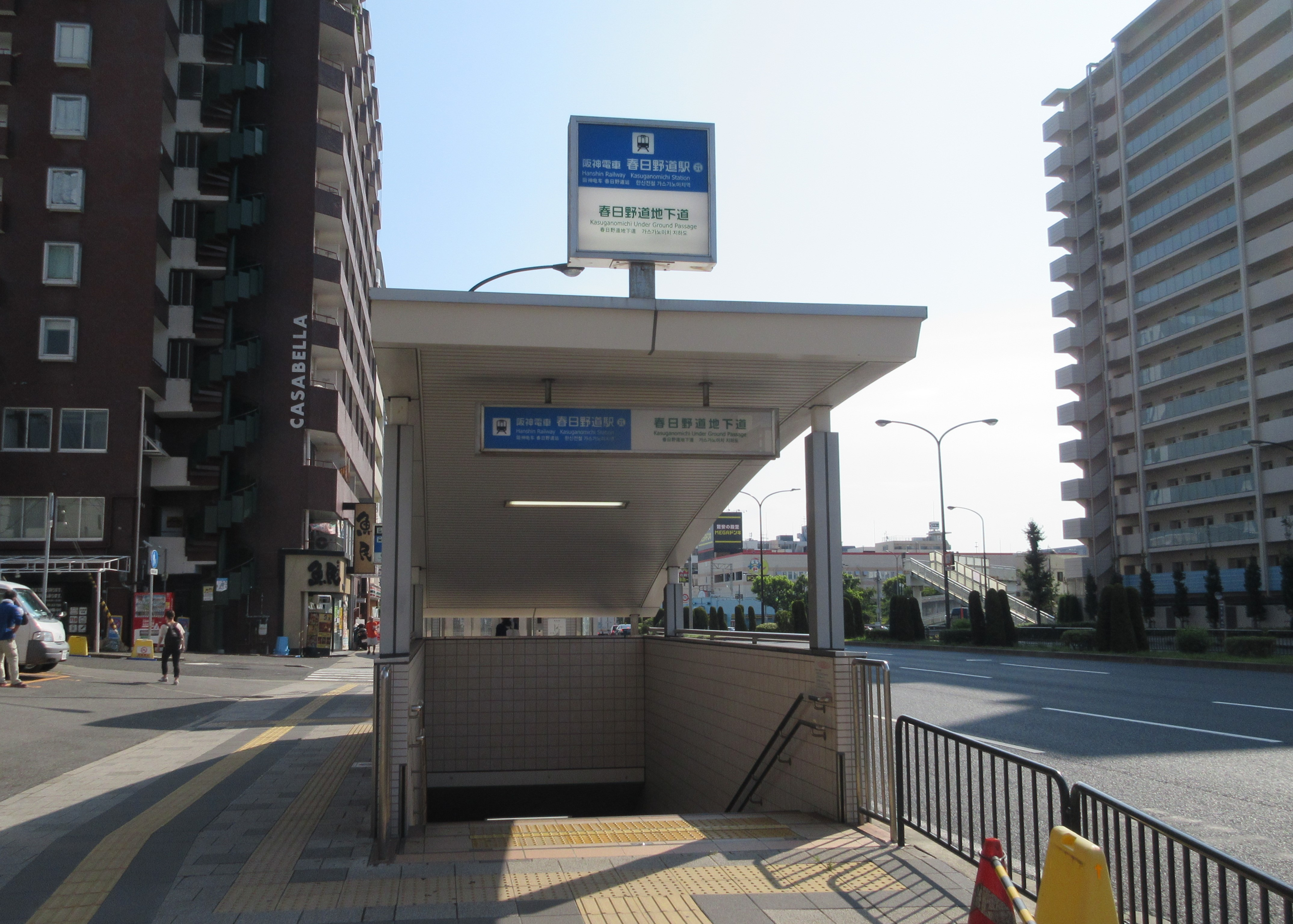
- Kasuganomichi Station

General information
- Location: Azuma-dōri 1-chōme, Chūō, Kobe, Hyōgo （神戸市中央区吾妻通一丁目） Japan
- Coordinates: 34°42′11″N 135°12′19″E
- Operator: Hanshin Electric Railway
- Line: Main Line
- Connections: Bus stop

Other information
- Station code: HS 31

History
- Opened: 1905

Passengers
- 2006: 10,917 daily

Services
Hanshin Main Line (HS 31)
Iwaya (HS 30)	Local	Kobe-Sannomiya (HS 32)
Rapid Express: Does not stop at this station
Limited Express; Through Limited Express: Does not stop at this station
Location

Kasuganomichi Station (春日野道駅, Kasuganomichi-eki) is a railway station in Chūō-ku, Kobe, Hyōgo Prefecture, Japan.

== Overview ==
Kasuganomichi is an underground station. It is served by two side platforms serving two tracks.

=== Layout ===
1	■ Main Line	for Koshien, Amagasaki, Osaka (Umeda), Namba, and Nara
2	■ Main Line	for Kobe-Sannomiya, Kosoku Kobe, Akashi, and Himeji

=== History ===
Kasuganomichi Station opened on the Hanshin Main Line on 12 April 1905.

The station was moved underground in 1934.

Once dubbed "Japan's scariest station", the layout built in 1934 was a single platform serving two tracks. The single island platform was only 2.6 m (8.5 ft) wide, which was narrower than the average train body (2.8 m (9.2 ft)). Construction work on new side platforms concluded in September 2004.

Station numbering was introduced on 21 December 2013, with Kasuganomichi being designated as station number HS-31.

== Gallery ==
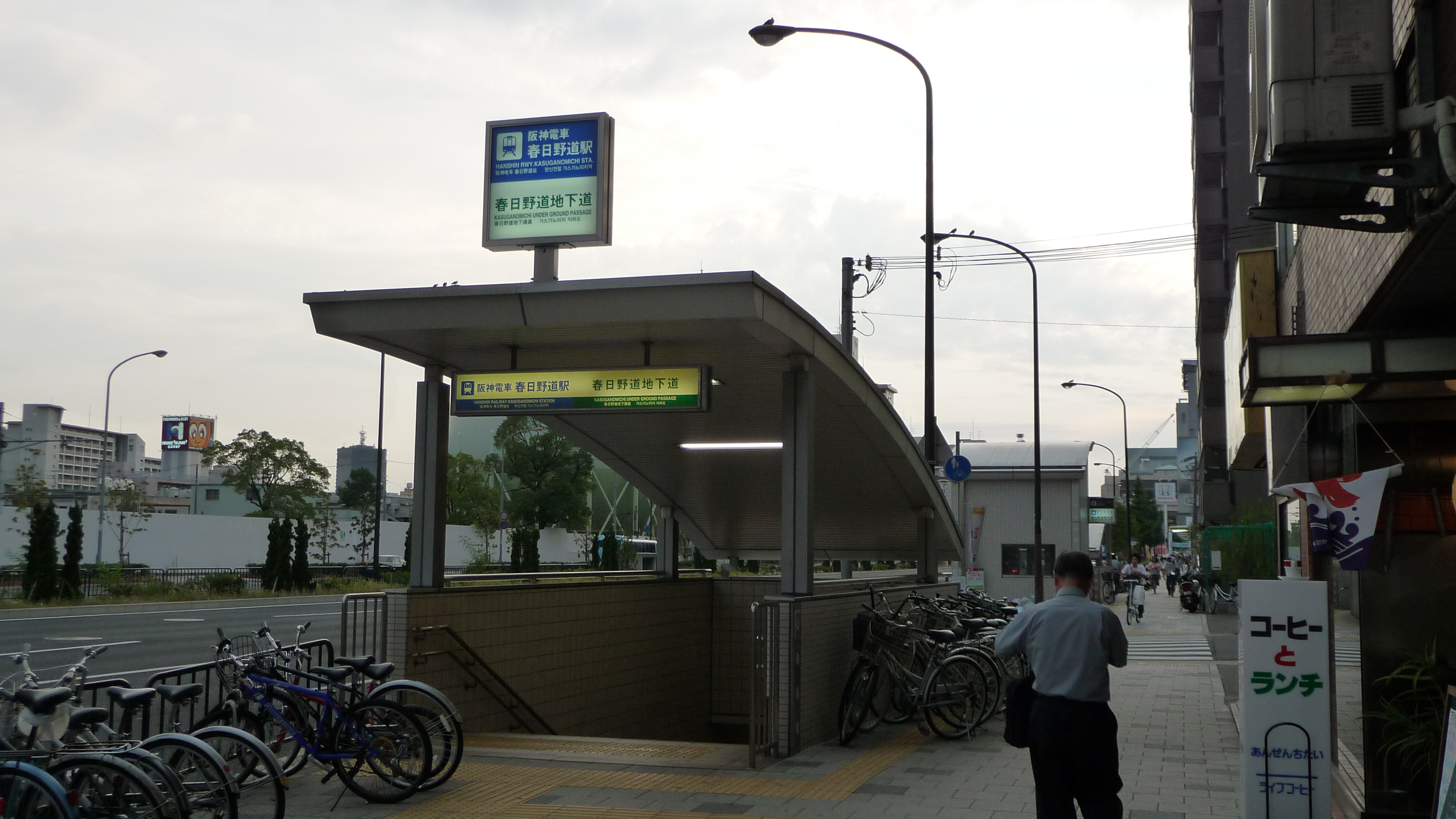
East station entrance

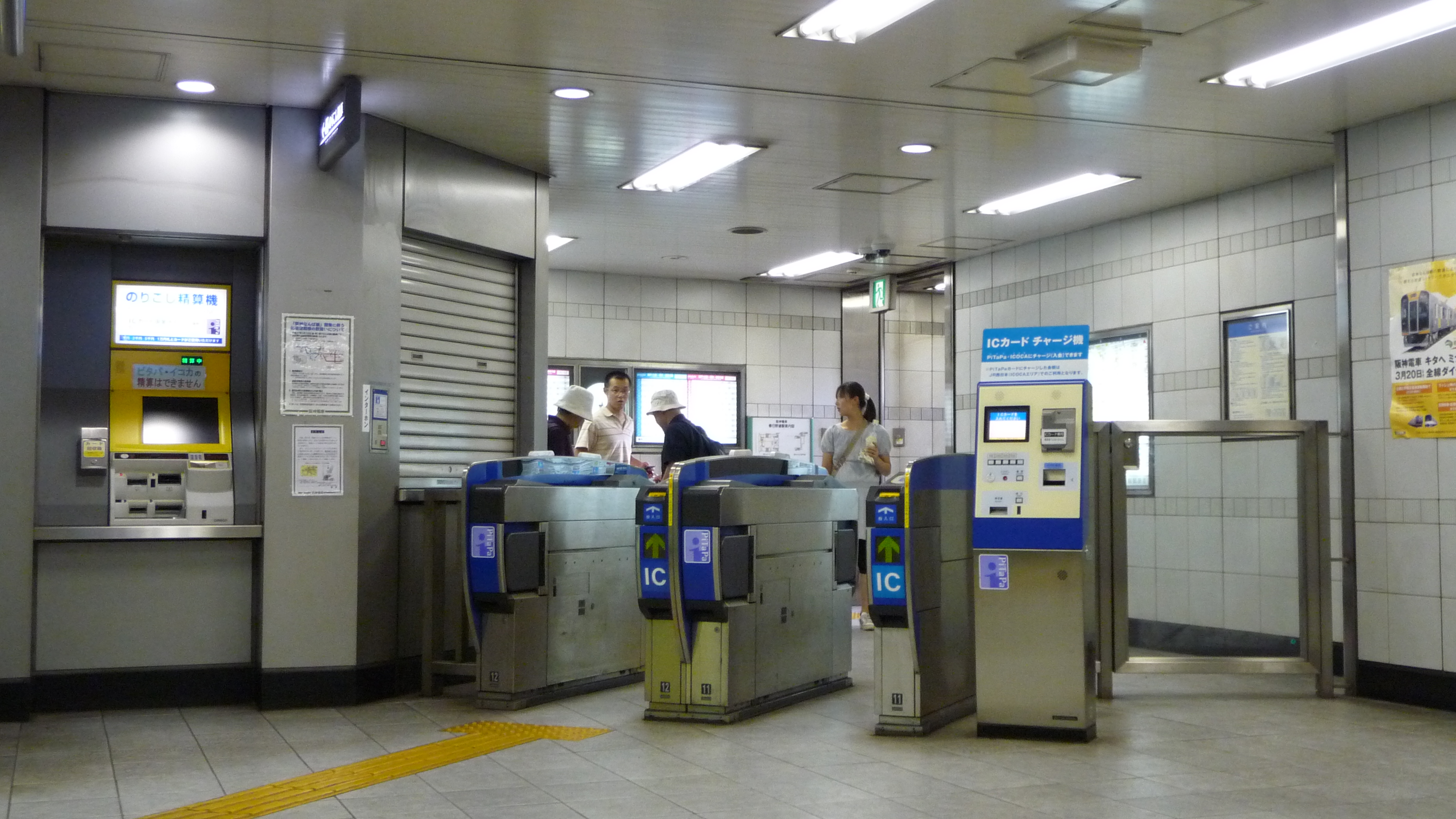
West exit faregates

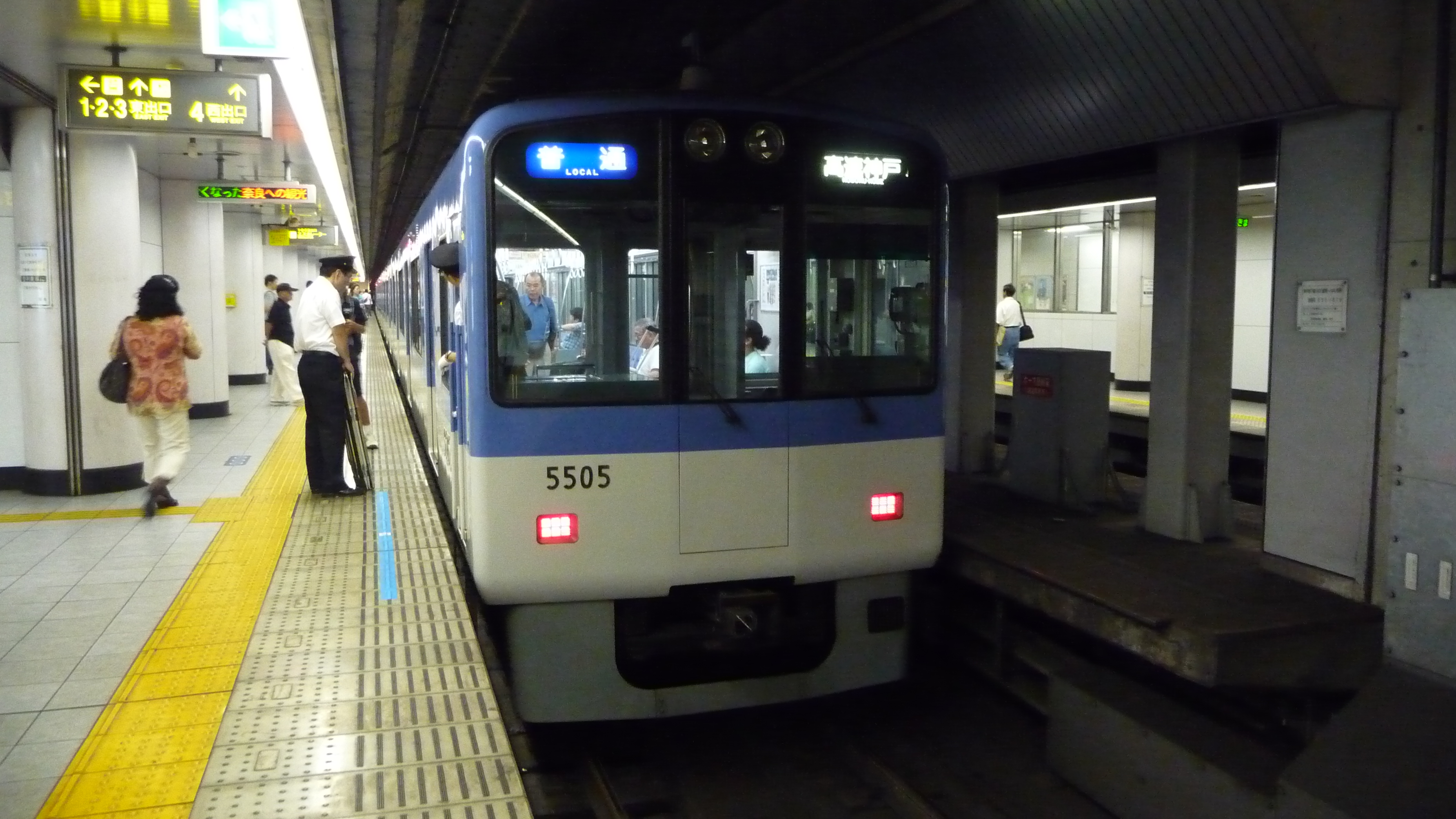
Westbound platforms for Kobe-Sannomiya, Shinkaichi, and Himeji

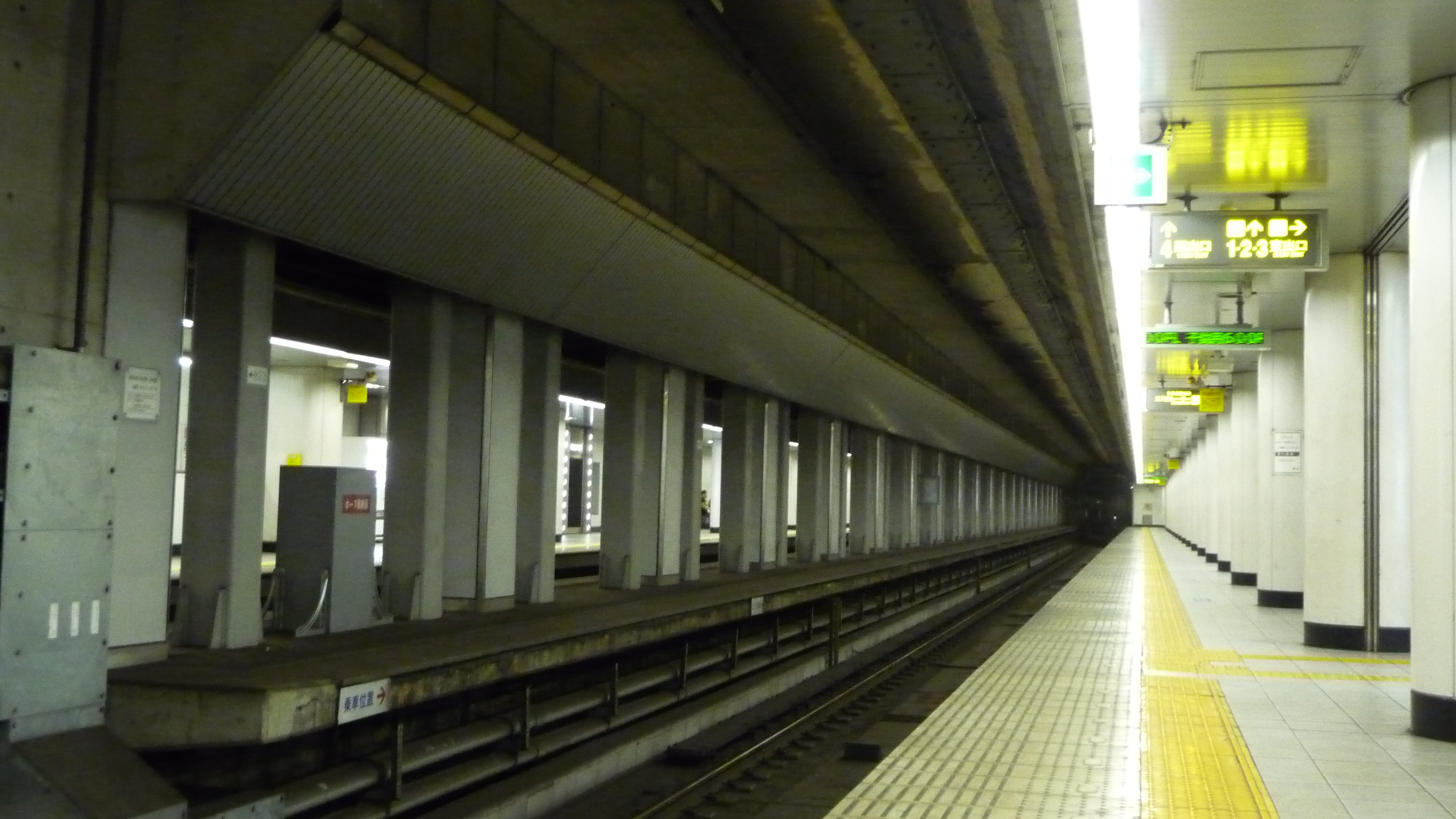
The old platforms as seen in 2009
