= Nishimotomezuka Kofun =

Historical Japanese burial mound

- 西求女塚古墳 (Japanese)
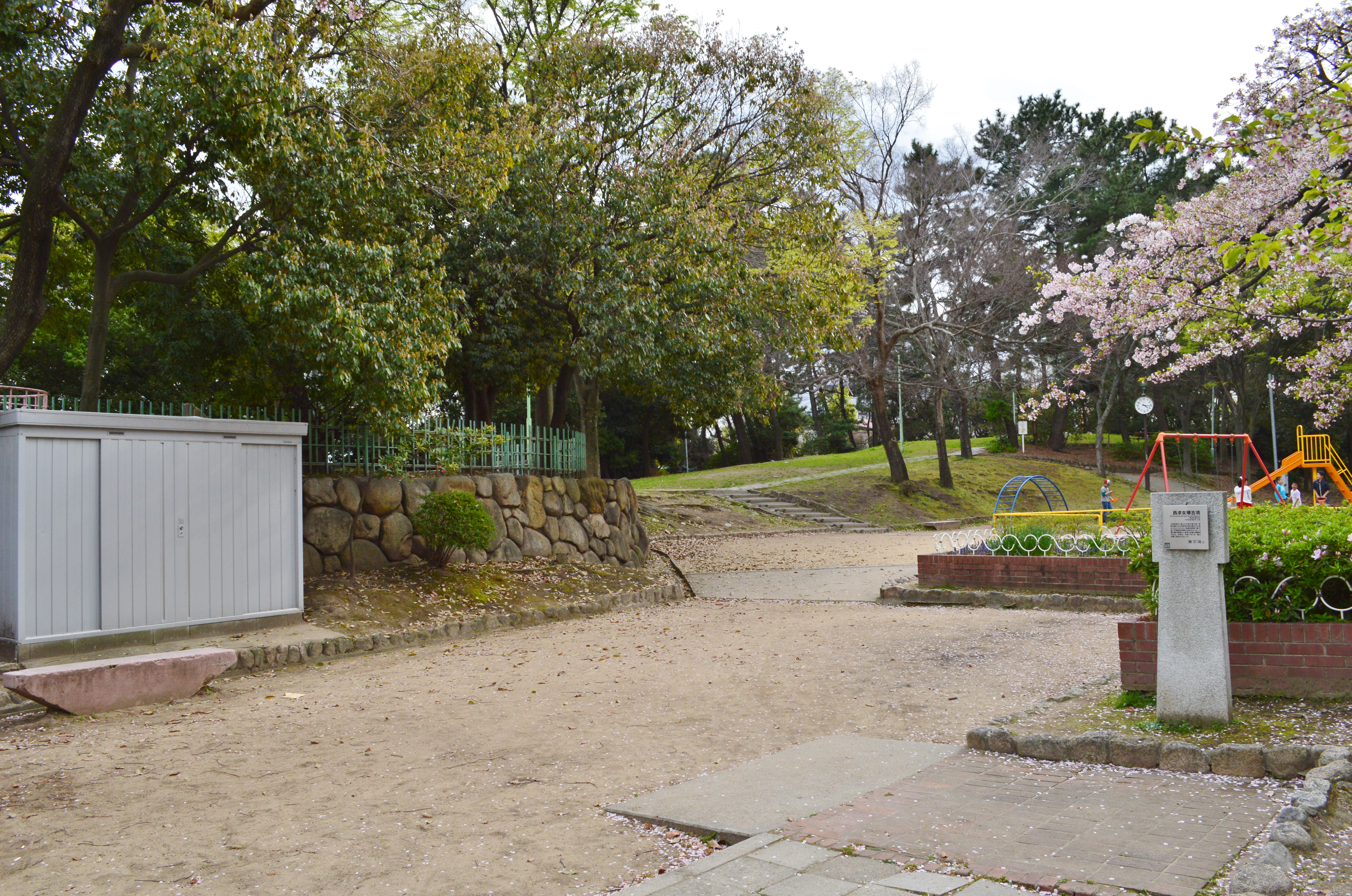
- Nishimotomezuka Kofun

- Nishimotomezuka Kofun Nishimotomezuka Kofun (Japan)
- Interactive map of Nishimotomezuka Kofun
- 34°42′18.38″N 135°13′35.41″E
- Type: Kofun
- Periods: Kofun period
- Location: Nada-ku, Kobe, Hyōgo Prefecture, Japan
- Region: Kansai region

History
- Built: mid 3rd century

Site notes
- Public access: Yes (no facilities)

Nishimotomezuka Kofun (西求女塚古墳) is a Kofun period burial mound, located in the Miyakodori, neighborhood of Nada-ku, Kobe, Hyōgo Prefecture, in the Kansai region of Japan. The tumulus was designated a National Historic Site of Japan in 2005.

== Overview ==
The Nishimotomezuka Kofun is a zenpō-kōhō-fun (前方後方墳), which is shaped like a keyhole, formed by two conjoined rectangles, when viewed from above. It is located on an alluvial fan at an elevation of six to eight meters between the southern foot of Mount Rokkō and Osaka Bay in the southeastern part of the prefecture. The existence of ancient burial mounds has been known since ancient times and is one of the several early Kofun period burial mounds distributed in the area. Together with the Otomezuka Kofun (処女塚古墳) and the Higashimotomezuka Kofun (東求女塚古墳) it has been connected with the Unai-otomo Legend (菟原処女の伝説), which appears in the Man'yōshū and the Yamato Monogatari, a tragic love story in which a beautiful young maiden is distrait that two equally worthy suitors are fighting for her hand in marriage. Unable to choose between the two, she commits suicide and the two suitors both follow her into death.

Due to landslides and other natural disasters, notably the 1596 Keichō–Fushimi earthquake, the burial chamber of the tumulus collapsed, and the form of the tumulus became unclear. Traditionally, it was thought to be a zenpō-kōen-fun (前方後円墳) keyhole-shaped tumulus, but as a result of archaeological excavations that have been continuously conducted since 1985, it was found that it was the largest two conjoined rectangle style tumulus in the early Kofun period. The tumulus was found to measure 98 meters in length, with a 52-meter rear portion, 46 meter anterior, 50 meters in width at the rear, 25 meters in width at the neck, and up to 9 meters in height. The main axis is orientated in the east–west direction, and there are two or more steps in the front part, and fukiishi were slightly detected near the base. The burial chamber was a pit-type stone chamber with an auxiliary chamber, containing a split bamboo-shaped coffin. Stone materials for the burial chamber were not only local but were also transported from Awa Province (Tokushima Prefecture) and Kii Province (Wakayama Prefecture).

Grave goods included a total of 11 Shinju-kyo bronze mirrors, including seven triangular-rimmed divine beast mirrors, of the type that the Chinese chronicle Wei zhi (魏志 "Records of Wei"), which is part of the Records of the Three Kingdoms (三國志), states that Emperor Cao Rui sent to Queen Himiko of Wa in the year 239 CE. Two of the triangular-rimmed mirrors were found to be wrapped in cloth. The main room contained these bronze mirrors and jasper stone spindle-shaped artifacts, while the auxiliary room contained iron products such as 56 iron arrowheads, and 26 iron swords, iron daggers, axes, and fishing gear. From these grave goods, it is estimated that the tumulus was constructed before 250 CE. In 2005, these artifacts collectively designated as a National Important Cultural Property

Currently, the tumulus is maintained as a park. It is located a two-minute walk from Nishinada Station on the Hanshin Electric Railway Hanshin Main Line.

== See also ==
- List of Historic Sites of Japan (Hyōgo)

== Sources ==
- Goodrich, Carrington C., ed. (1951). Japan in the Chinese Dynastic Histories: Later Han Through Ming Dynasties. Translated by Tsunoda, Ryūsaku. South Pasadena, California: P. D. and Ione Perkins.
