= Ōishi Station =

Railway station in Kobe, Japan

Ōishi Station 大石駅
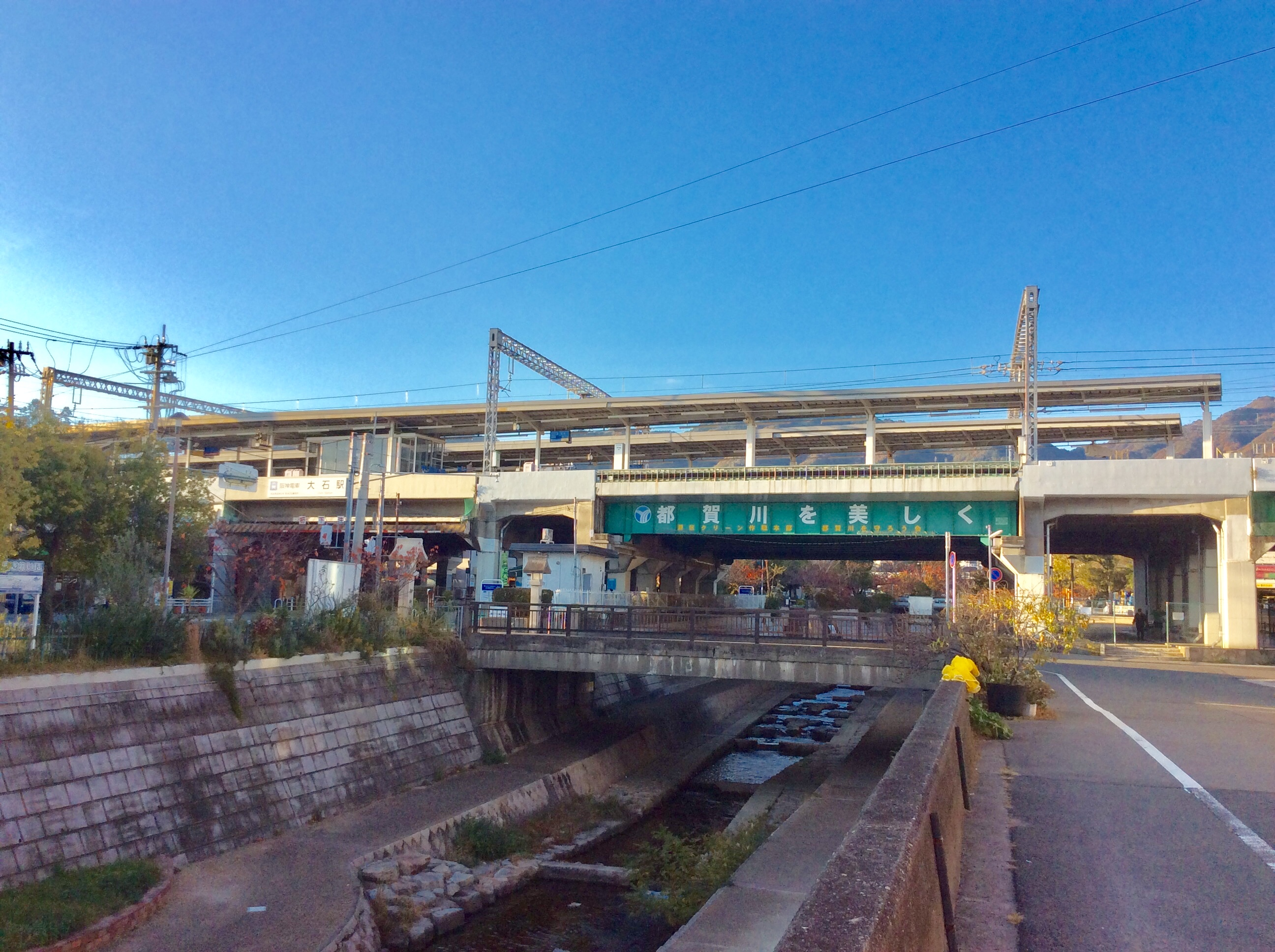
- Ōishi Station in November 2019

General information
- Location: Funadera-Dōri 1-chōme, Nada, Kobe, Hyōgo （神戸市灘区船寺通一丁目） Japan
- Coordinates: 34°42′27.98″N 135°13′51.57″E
- Operator: Hanshin Electric Railway
- Line: Main Line
- Connections: Bus stop

Other information
- Station code: HS 28

History
- Opened: 1905

Passengers
- 2005: 8,934 daily

Services
Hanshin Main Line (HS 28)
Shinzaike (HS 27)	Local	Nishi-Nada (HS 29)
Rapid Express: Does not stop at this station
Limited Express; Through Limited Express: Does not stop at this station
Location

Ōishi Station (大石駅, Ōishi-eki) is a railway station on the Hanshin Electric Railway Main Line in Nada-ku, Kobe, Hyōgo Prefecture, Japan.

== Overview ==
=== Layout ===
This station is elevated and has two island platforms serving two tracks each, and crossovers are located on both sides of the platforms enabling to depart from any track for Osaka and Kobe Sannomiya.

1	■ Main Line	Used for dead-head trains and returning trains using Sanyo Railway EMUs
2	■ Main Line	for Koshien, Amagasaki, Osaka (Umeda, Namba), and Nara
3	■ Main Line	for Kobe Sannomiya, Kosoku Kobe, Akashi, and Himeji
4	■ Main Line	Used for dead-head trains

=== History ===
Nishinada Station opened on the Hanshin Main Line on 12 April 1905.

Service was suspended owing to the Great Hanshin earthquake in January 1995. Restoration work on the Hanshin Main Line took 7 months to complete.

Station numbering was introduced on 21 December 2013, with Ōishi being designated as station number HS-28.

== Gallery ==
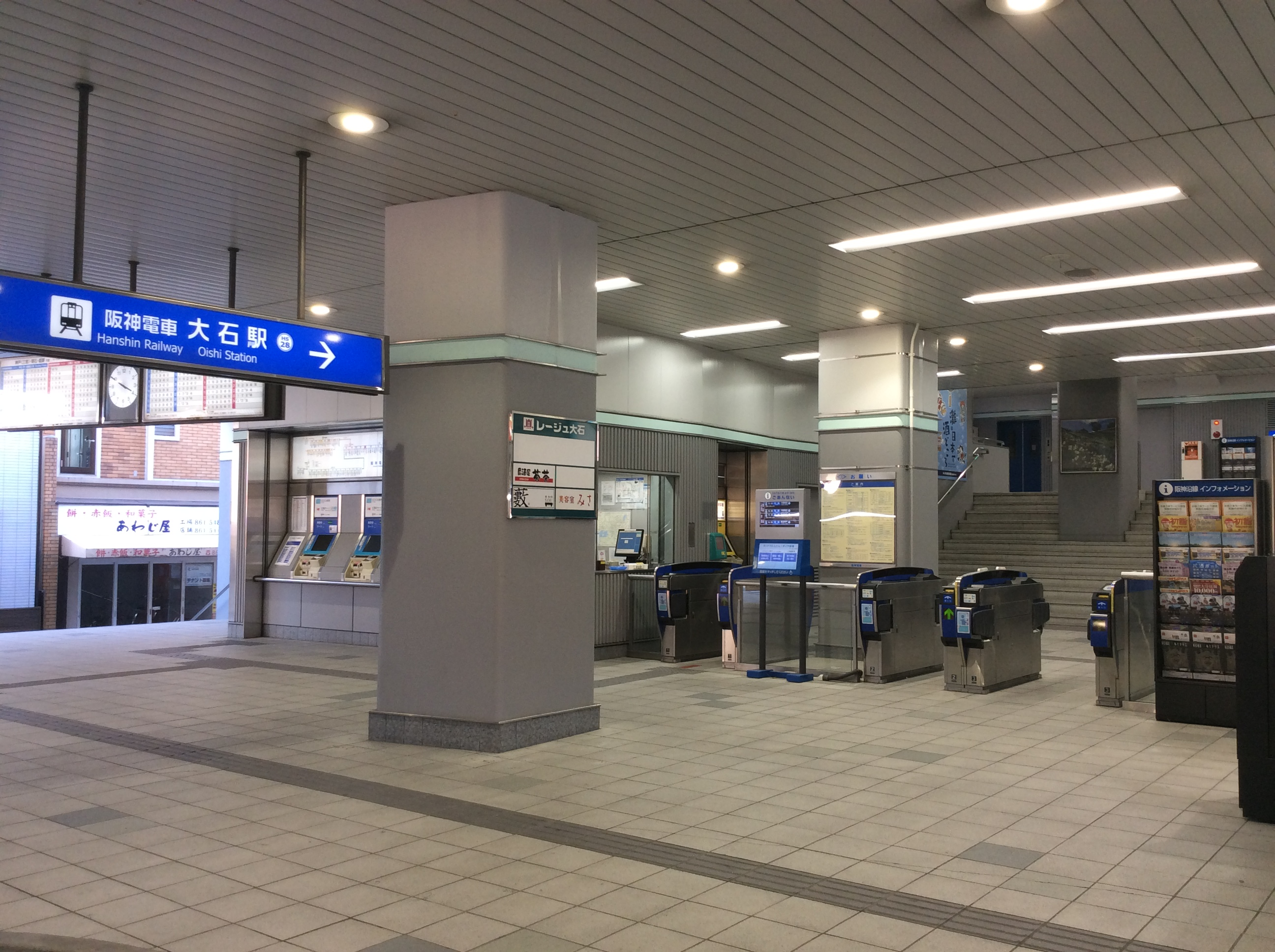
Station entrance in 2019

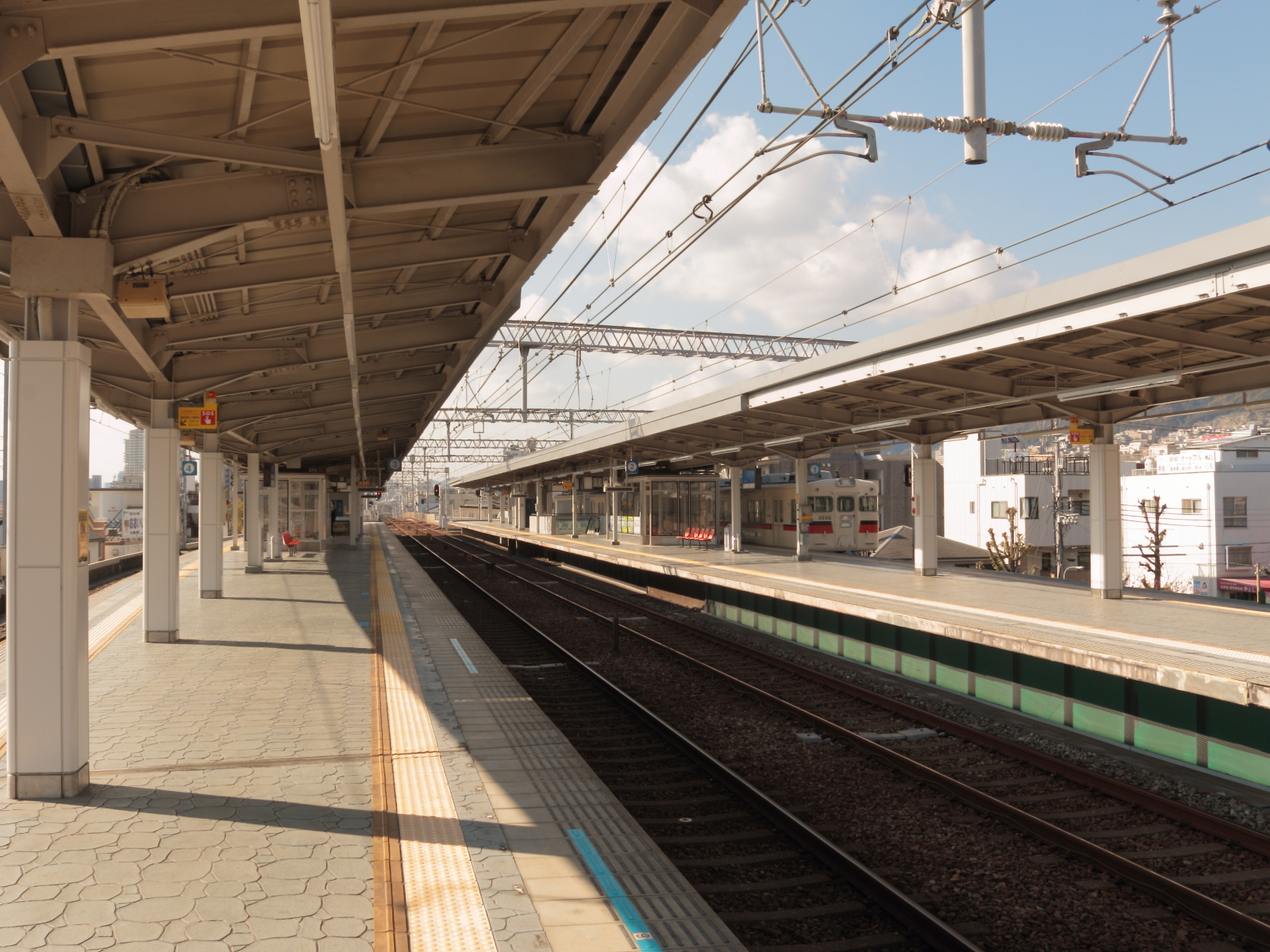
Station platforms in 2015

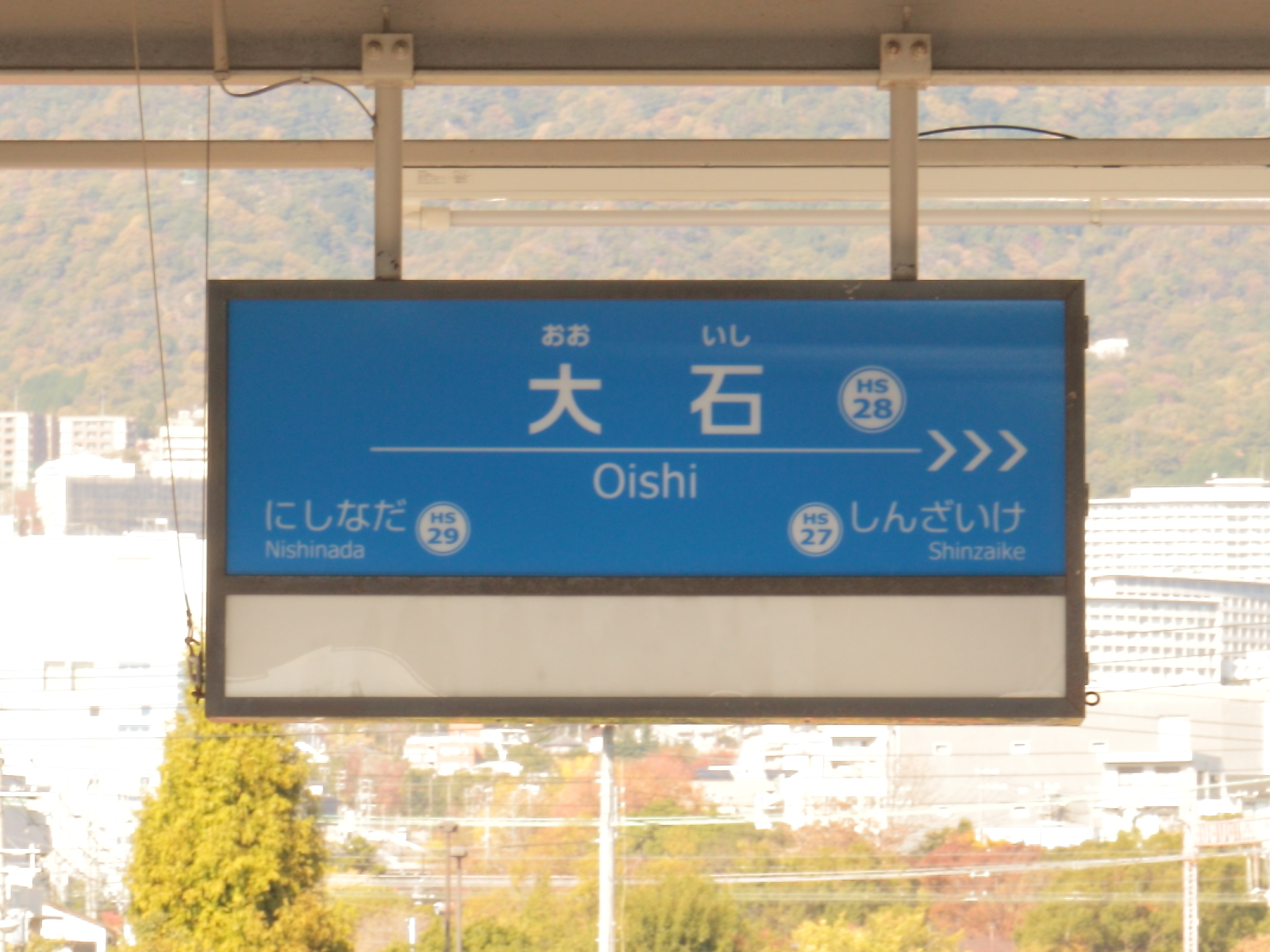
Station nameplate
