= Nishinada Station =

Railway station in Kobe, Japan

Nishinada Station 西灘駅
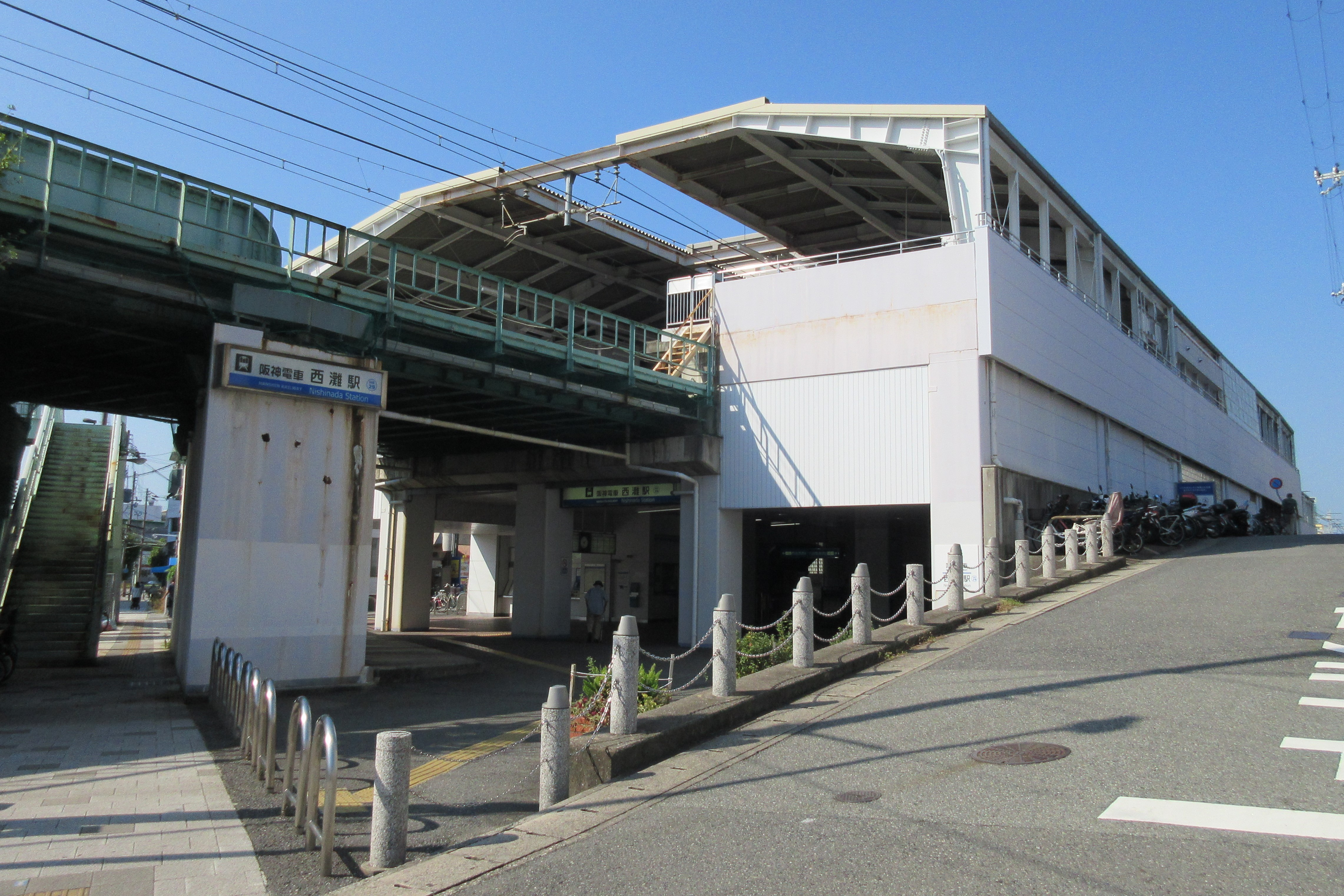
- Nishinada Station in September 2020

General information
- Location: 4-5 Miyako-dōri Nada, Kobe, Hyōgo （神戸市灘区都通五丁目5） Japan
- Coordinates: 34°42′21″N 135°13′29″E
- Operator: Hanshin Electric Railway
- Line: Hanshin Main Line
- Connections: Bus stop

Other information
- Station code: HS 29

History
- Opened: 1 July 1927

Passengers
- FY2006: 2,400 daily
Services
Hanshin Main Line (HS 29)
Ōishi (HS 28)	Local	Iwaya (HS 30)
Rapid Express: Does not stop at this station
Limited Express; Through Limited Express: Does not stop at this station
Location
- Location within Japan

Nishinada Station (西灘駅, Nishinada-eki) is a railway station on the Hanshin Main Line in Nada-ku, Kobe, Hyōgo Prefecture, Japan, operated by the private railway operator Hanshin Electric Railway.

== Overview ==
The station has two elevated side platforms serving two tracks.

=== Layout ===
1	■ Hanshin Main Line	for Koshien, Amagasaki, Osaka (Umeda), Namba, and Nara
2	■ Hanshin Main Line	for Sannomiya, Kosoku Kobe, Akashi, and Himeji

=== Surrounding area ===
- Maya Station on the JR Kobe Line (opening March 2016)
- Iwaya Intersection where Japan National Route 2 (国道2号) and Japan National Route 43 (国道43号) merge.

=== History ===
Nishinada Station opened on the Hanshin Main Line on 1 July 1927.

Station numbering was introduced on 21 December 2013, with Kasuganomichi being designated as station number HS-29.

== Gallery ==
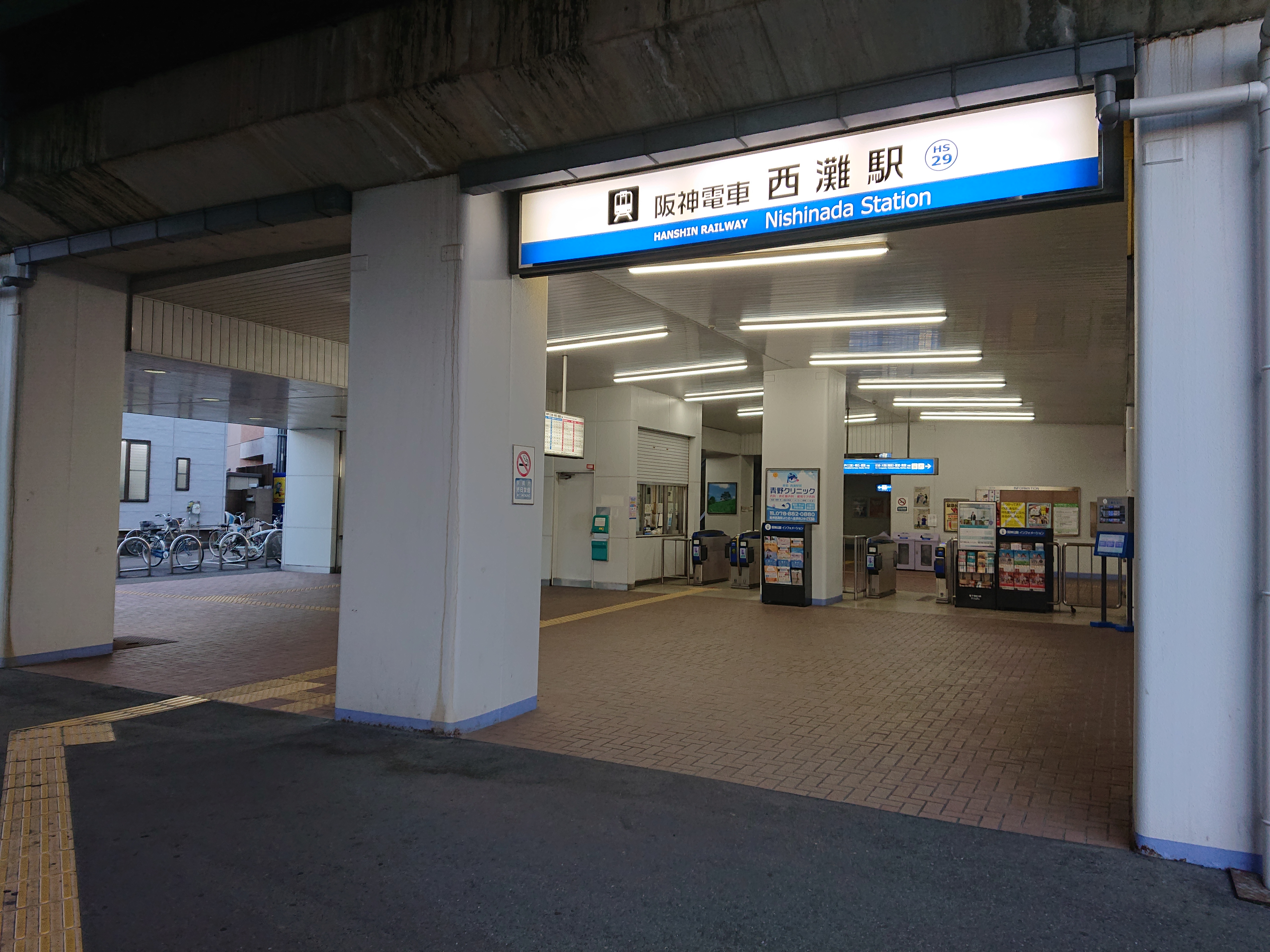
Station entrance

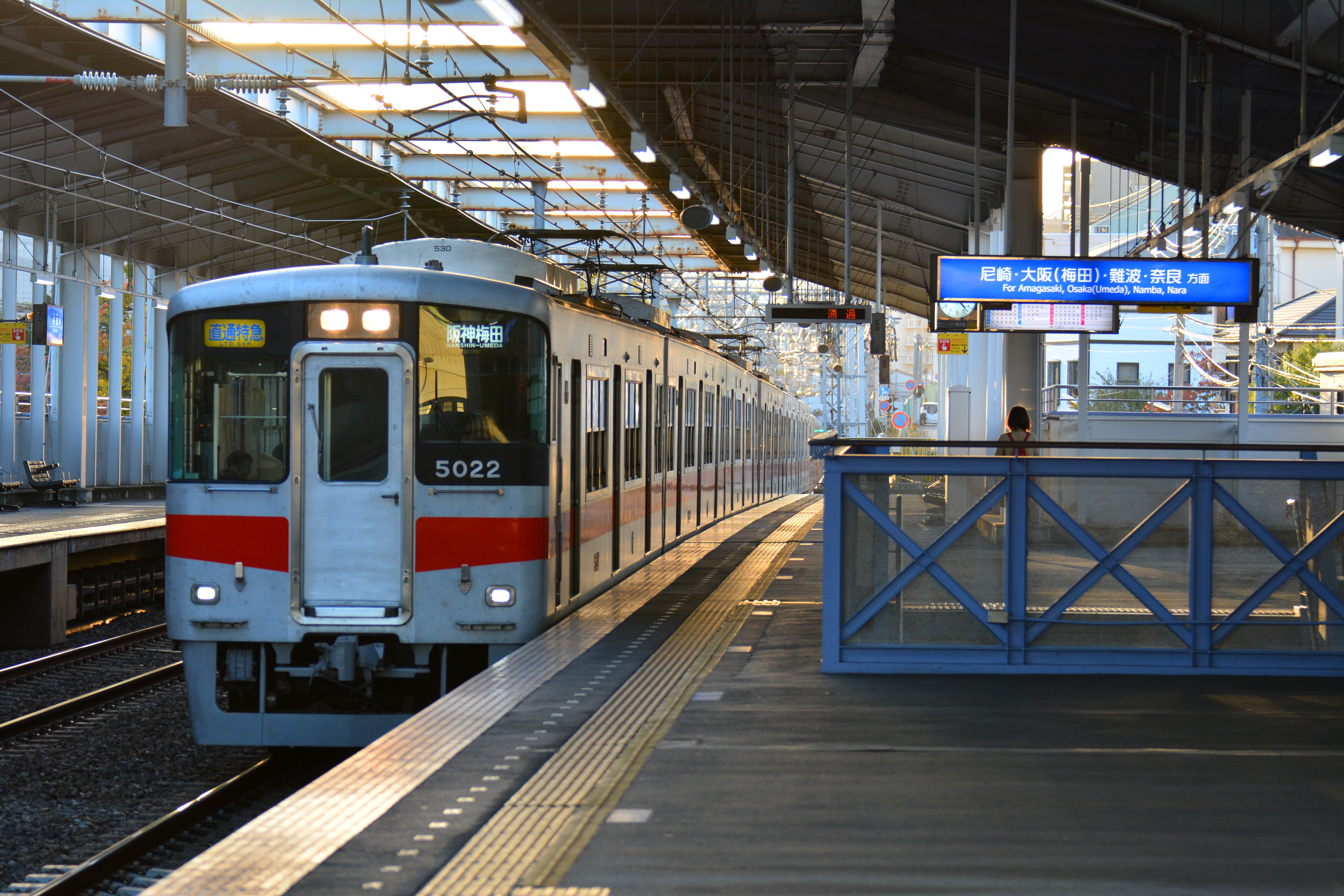
A Sanyo Electric Railway trainset passing by the station

== See also ==
- List of railway stations in Japan
