= Iwaya Station (Hyōgo) =

Railway station in Kobe, Japan

Iwaya Station 岩屋駅
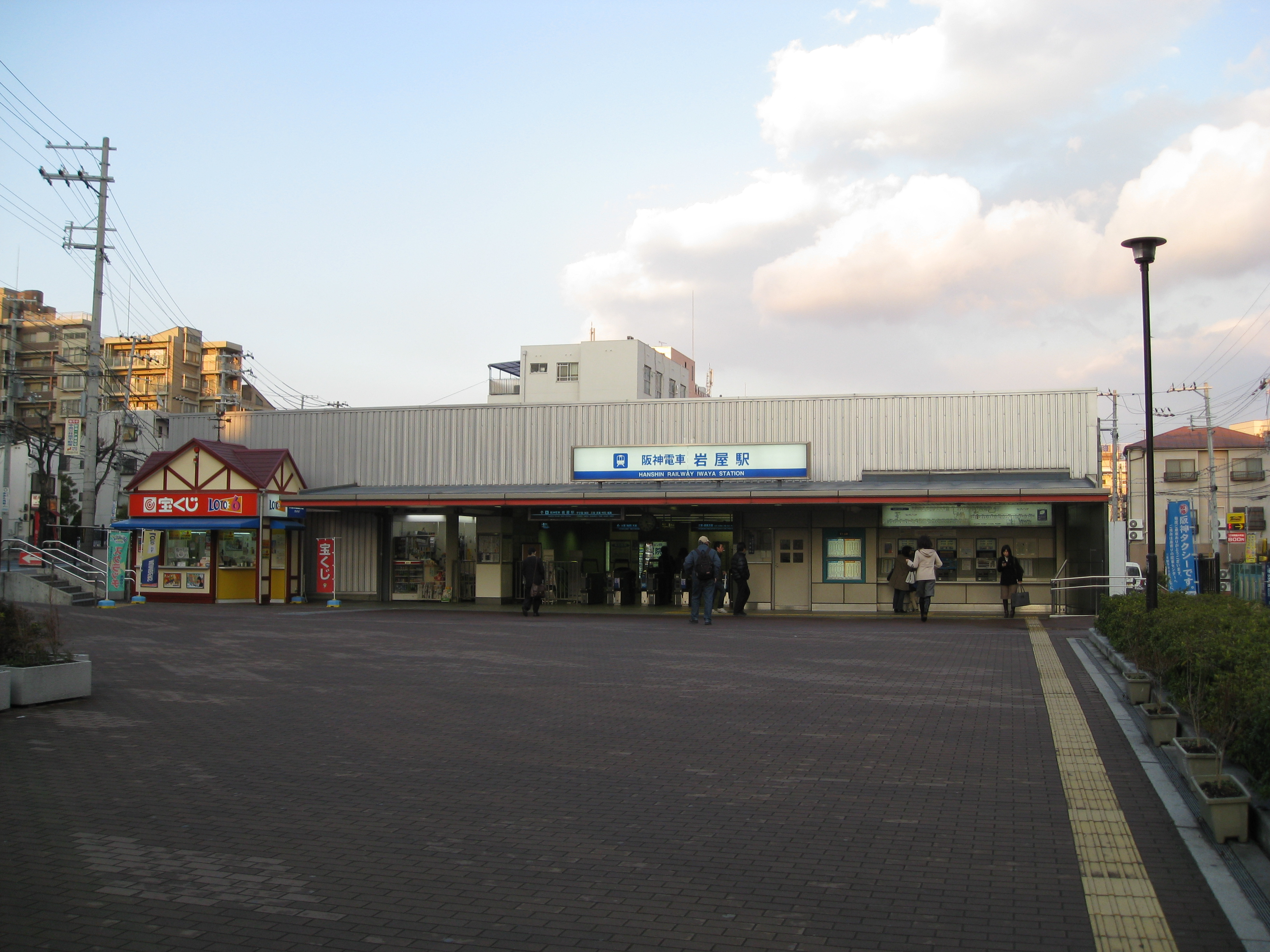
- Iwaya Station

General information
- Location: 2, Iwayakita-machi 4-chōme, Nada, Kobe, Hyōgo （神戸市灘区岩屋北町） Japan
- Coordinates: 34°42′15″N 135°13′04″E
- Operator: Hanshin Electric Railway
- Line: Main Line
- Connections: Bus stop

Other information
- Station code: HS 30

History
- Opened: 1905

Passengers
- 2007: 9,804 daily

Services
Hanshin Electric Railway Main Line (HS 30)
Nishi-Nada (HS 29)	Local	Kasuganomichi (HS 31)
Rapid Express: Does not stop at this station
Limited Express; Through Limited Express: Does not stop at this station
Location

Iwaya Station (岩屋駅, Iwaya-eki) is a railway station of Hanshin Main Line, in Nada-ku, Kobe, Hyōgo Prefecture, Japan, between Nishi-Nada Station and Kasuganomichi Station.

== Overview ==
=== Layout ===
- There are a side platform and an island platform serving a track each in a trench.

1	■ Main Line	for Koshien, Amagasaki, Osaka (Umeda), Namba, and Nara
2	■ Main Line	for Sannomiya, Kosoku Kobe, Akashi, and Himeji

=== Surroundings ===
The station is located near Nada Station of JR Kōbe Line (Tōkaidō Main Line) and is an entrance to Hyogo Prefectural Museum of Art, Hyogo International Center of JICA, WHO Centre for Health Development and Disaster Reduction and Human Renovation Institution.

=== History ===
Iwaya Station opened on the Hanshin Main Line on 12 April 1905.

The tracks to the west of the station were moved underground in 1934.

Service was suspended owing to the Great Hanshin earthquake in January 1995. Restoration work on the Hanshin Main Line took 7 months to complete.

Station numbering was introduced on 21 December 2013, with Iwaya being designated as station number HS-30.

== Gallery ==
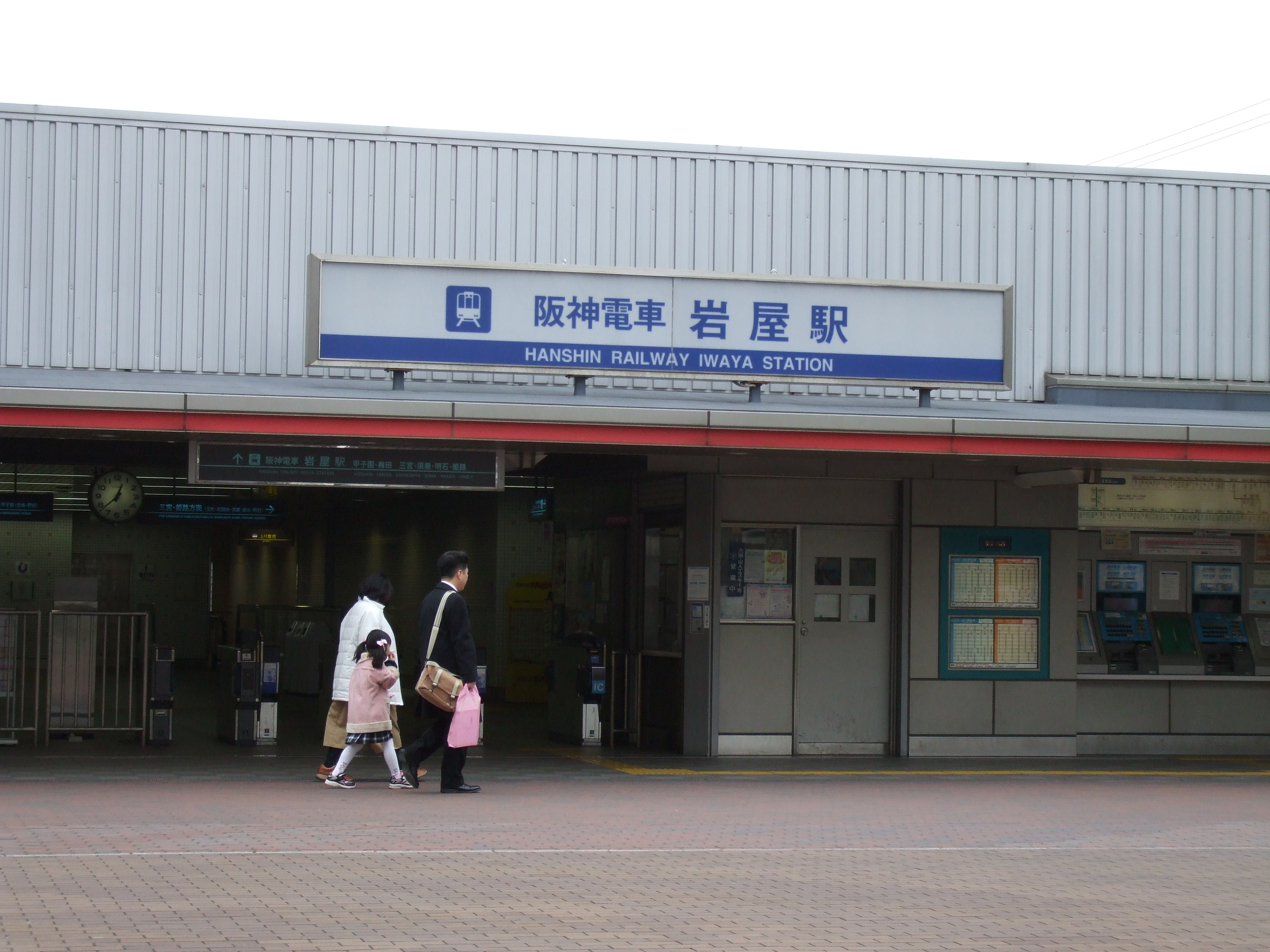
Station entrance

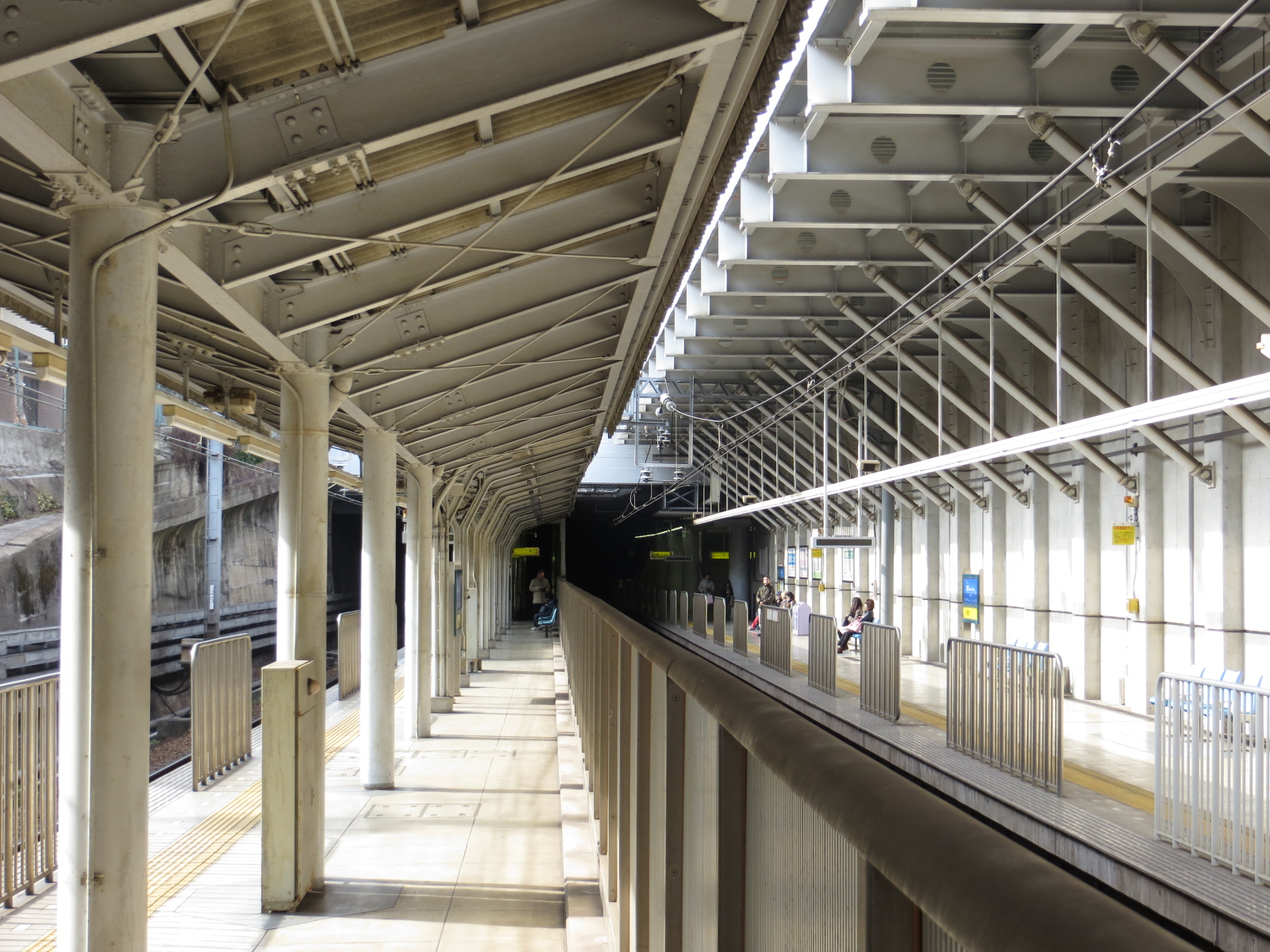
View of the platforms in January 2013
