= Rokkōmichi Station =

Railway station in Kobe, Japan

Rokkōmichi Station 六甲道駅
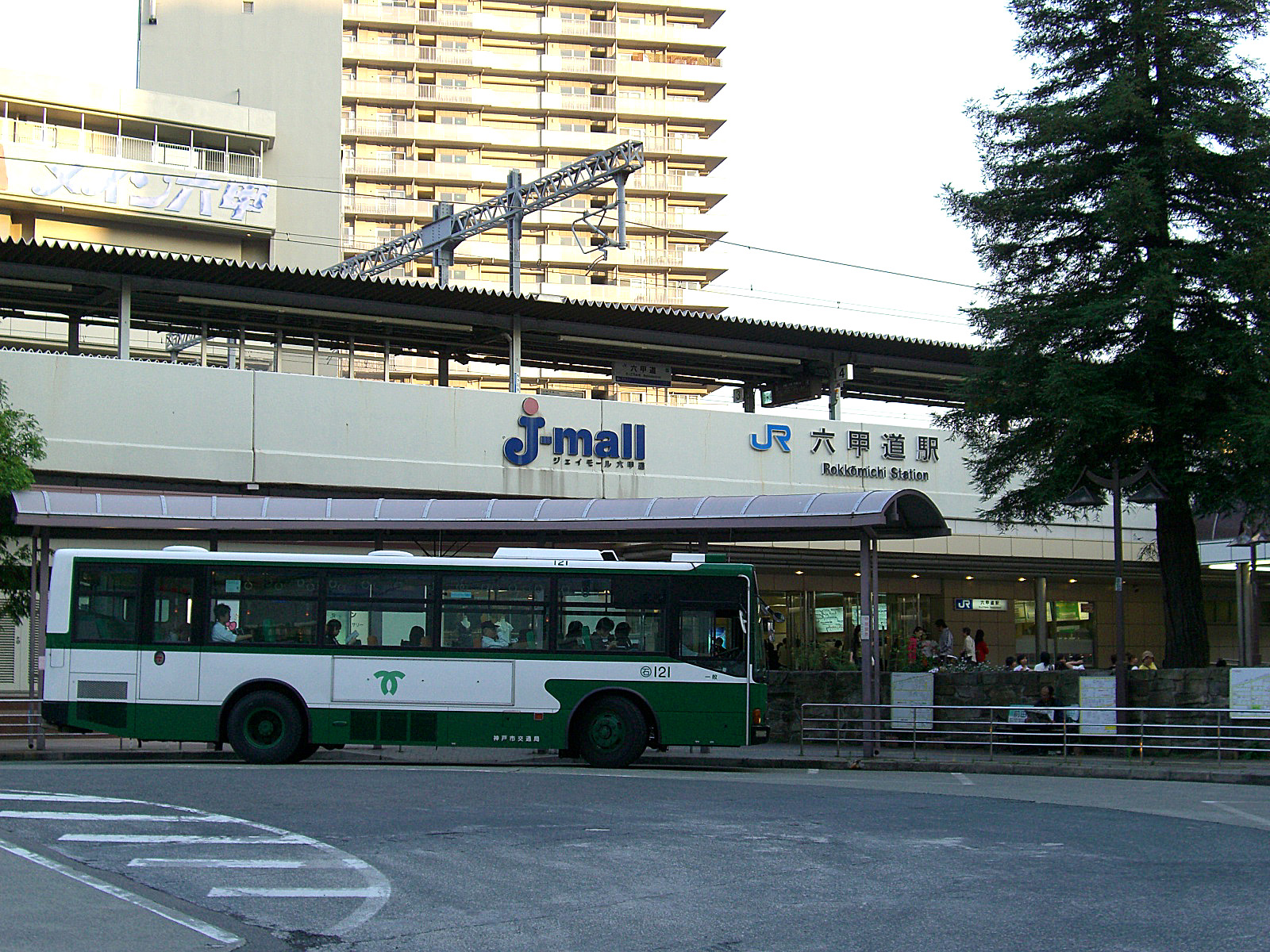
- North gate of Rokkōmichi Station

General information
- Location: 11-1, Nagatecho Yonchome, Nada-ku, Kobe-shi, Hyōgo-ken; Japan
- Coordinates: 34°42′53.96″N 135°14′18.63″E
- Owner: JR West
- Operator: JR West
- Line: Tōkaidō Main Line (JR Kobe Line)
- Distance: 582.3 km (361.8 miles) from Tokyo
- Platforms: 2 island platforms
- Connections: Bus stop

Construction
- Structure type: Elevated
- Accessible: Yes

Other information
- Status: Staffed (Midori no Madoguchi )
- Station code: JR-A58
- Website: Official website

History
- Opened: 30 July 1934

Passengers
- FY 2023: 49,536 daily
Location
- Location within Hyōgo Prefecture Location within Japan

Rokkōmichi Station (六甲道駅, Rokkōmichi--eki) is a passenger railway station located in Nada-ku, Kobe, Hyōgo Prefecture, Japan. It is operated by the West Japan Railway Company (JR West).

== Lines ==
Rokkōmichi Station is served by the Tōkaidō Main Line (JR Kobe Line), and is located 582.3 kilometers from the terminus of the line at Tokyo and 25.9 kilometers from Osaka.

== Station layout ==
The station consists of two elevated island platforms with the station building underneath; however, only the inner tracks are normally used, with the outer tracks reserved for passing express trains except during peak commuting hours. The station has a Midori no Madoguchi staffed ticket office.

=== Platforms ===
1	■ JR Kobe Line	rapid services for Sannomiya and Himeji (partly in the morning on weekdays)
2	■ JR Kobe Line	local trains and rapid services for Sannomiya and Himeji
3	■ JR Kobe Line	local trains and rapid services for Amagasaki, Osaka and Kyoto
4	■ JR Kobe Line	rapid services for Amagasaki, Osaka and Kyoto (partly in the morning)

== Adjacent stations ==
«	Service	»
JR West Tōkaidō Line (JR Kobe Line)
Sumiyoshi (JR-A57)	Local	Maya (JR-A59)
Sumiyoshi (JR-A57)	Rapid Service	Sannomiya (JR-A61)
Special Rapid Service: Does not stop at this station

== History ==
Rokkōmichi Station opened on 20 July 1934. With the privatization of the Japan National Railways (JNR) on 1 April 1987, the station came under the aegis of the West Japan Railway Company. Due to the Great Hanshin earthquake of 17 January 1995, the first floor of the station building, which had just been rebuilt several years previously, collapsed along with the elevated tracks. Restoration work was completed by 1 April of the same year.

Station numbering was introduced in March 2018 with Rokkōmichi being assigned station number JR-A58.

== Passenger statistics ==
In fiscal 2019, the station was used by an average of 26,441 passengers daily

== Surrounding area ==
- Nada Ward Office
- Kobe University
- Kobe Shoin Women's College Junior College Division
- Shinwa Junior High School/Shinwa Girls' High School
- Rokkomichi Minami Park (Completed on September 15, 2005, as part of Kobe City's post-earthquake reconstruction and redevelopment project)

== See also ==
- List of railway stations in Japan
