= 5500 series =

5500 series may refer to:

- Avaya ERS 5500 Series, a series of stackable Layer 3 switches used in computer networking
- Hanshin 5500 series, a Japanese train type
- Toei 5500 series, a Japanese train type
