= Hanshin 3000 series =

Japanese electric multiple unit train type

- Replaced: 8000 series
- Entered service: Planned for 2027
- Formation: 6 cars per trainset
- Operator: Hanshin
- Lines served: Hanshin Main Line; Kobe Kosoku Line; Sanyo Electric Railway Main Line

Specifications
- Traction system: Variable frequency
- Traction motors: Synchronous reluctance motor

The Hanshin 3000 series (Japanese: 阪神3000系, romanized: Hanshin 3000-kei) is an electric multiple unit (EMU) train type on order by the private railway operator Hanshin Electric Railway for use on express services in Japan.

== Design ==
The 3000 series will carry a "Re Vermilion" colour scheme inspired by the vermilion livery carried by previous Hanshin express trains.

== Technical specifications ==
The trains will use a SynTRACS variable-frequency traction control system incorporating synchronous reluctance motors, offering approximately 60% energy savings over the earlier 8000 series.

== Operations ==
The 3000 series is planned to enter revenue service in early 2027 to gradually replace the ageing 8000 series fleet. The train type will also allow for a joint introduction of reserved-seat services in one car. These services are planned to operate between Osaka-Umeda on the Hanshin Main Line and Sanyo-Himeji on the Sanyo Electric Railway Main Line via the Kobe Kosoku Line. On 17 July 2026, Hanshin announced that the seat reservation service would be named Rakuyan Seat (らくやんシート).
