= Hanshin 5500 series =

Japanese train type

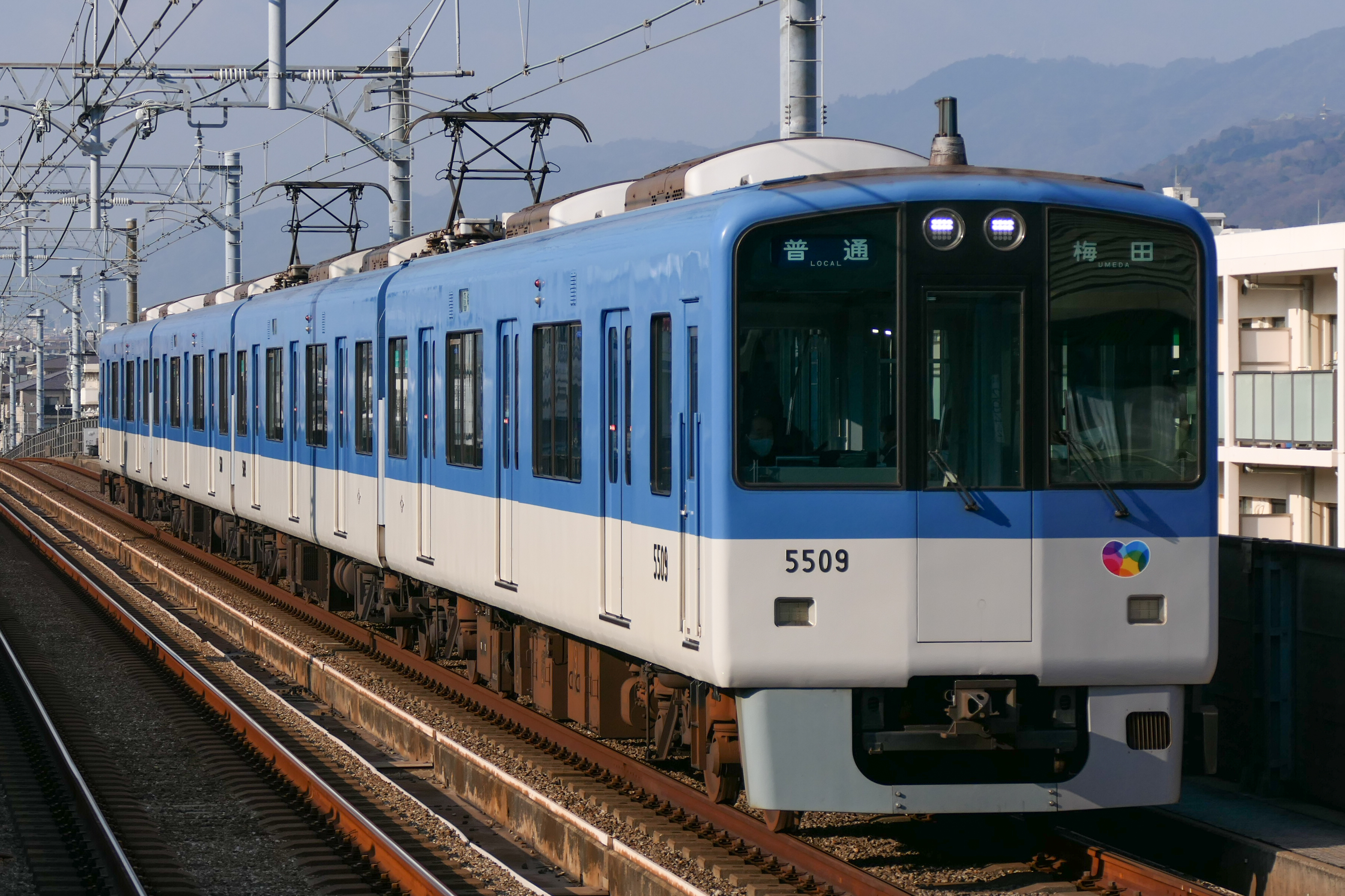
- Set 5509 in December 2021
- Manufacturers: Mukogawa Sharyo, Kawasaki Heavy Industries
- Family name: Jet Car
- Replaced: 5001 series; 7861 series; Rolling stock damaged by the 1995 Great Hanshin Earthquake
- Constructed: 1995–2000
- Entered service: 1 November 1995
- Refurbished: 2017–
- Number built: 36 vehicles (9 sets)
- Number in service: 36 vehicles (11 sets)
- Formation: 4 cars per Main Line trainset; 2 cars per Mukogawa Line trainset
- Fleet numbers: 5501–5517
- Capacity: 132 per car
- Operator: Hanshin Electric Railway
- Lines served: Hanshin Main Line; Hanshin Mukogawa Line

Specifications
- Car body construction: Steel
- Car length: 18,980 mm (62 ft 3 in)
- Width: 2,800 mm (9 ft 2 in)
- Height: 4,060 mm (13 ft 4 in)
- Doors: 3 pairs per side
- Maximum speed: 90 km/h (56 mph)
- Traction system: Variable frequency (GTO)
- Power output: 110 kW per motor
- Acceleration: 4.0 km/(h⋅s) (2.5 mph/s)
- Deceleration: 4.5 km/(h⋅s) (2.8 mph/s) (service); 5.0 km/(h⋅s) (3.1 mph/s) (emergency)
- Electric system: 1,500 V DC
- Current collection: Overhead catenary
- Braking system: Electronically controlled pneumatic brakes with regenerative braking
- Safety system: Hanshin ATS
- Coupling system: Shibata-type
- Track gauge: 1,435 mm (4 ft 8 1/2 in)

The Hanshin 5500 series (阪神電鉄5500系, Hanshin Dentetsu 5500-kei) is a commuter electric multiple unit (EMU) train type operated by the private railway operator Hanshin Electric Railway in Japan since 1995.

== Design ==
Manufactured to replace any previous train cars damaged by the January 1995 Great Hanshin earthquake, the design of the 5500 series is based on the earlier 8000 series trains. The 5500 series was the first variable-frequency drive-equipped train type to be introduced by the Hanshin Electric Railway.

== Operations ==
Together with the sole 5550 series set, the 5500 series sets are used primarily on Hanshin Main Line services.

== Formation ==
=== Mainline sets ===
As of 1 April 2016, nine four-car sets are in service, formed as shown below. All cars are powered.

Designation	Mc1	M1	M2	Mc2
Numbering	55xx (odd)	56xx (odd)	56xx (even)	55xx (even)
Capacity (total/seated)	132/48	132/50	132/50	132/48

The two intermediate (M1 and M2) cars are each fitted with one lozenge-type pantograph.

=== Mukogawa Line sets ===
The Mukogawa Line sets are formed as shown below.

Designation	M'c1	Mc1	Mc2	M'c2
Numbering	551x (odd)	591x (odd)	591x (even)	551x (even)
Capacity (total/seated)	127/39	125/40	125/40	127/39

The 591x cars are each fitted with two single-arm pantographs.

== Interior ==
Passenger accommodation consists of longitudinal bench seating throughout, with sculpted seats finished in blue moquette.

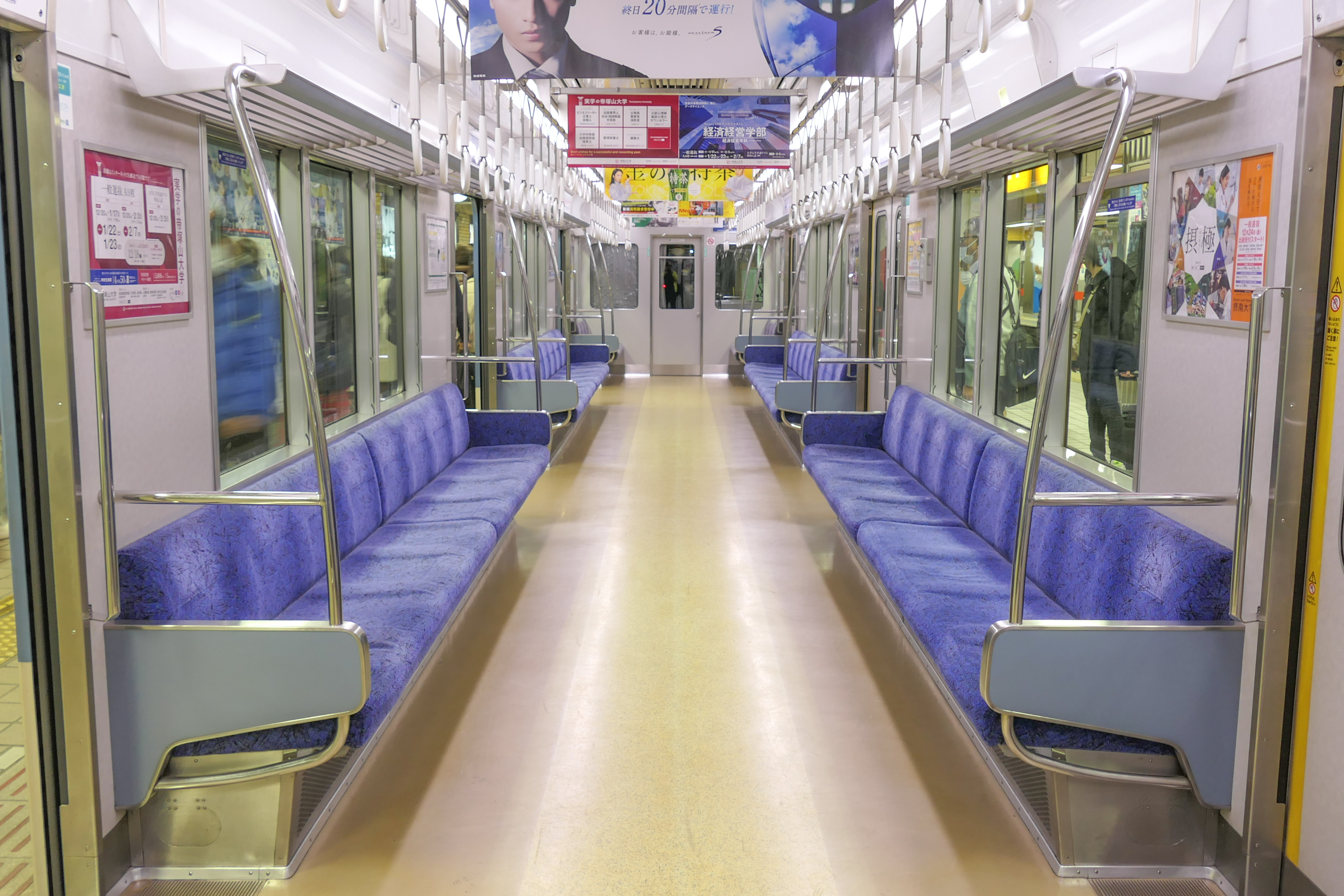

== History ==
The first trains entered service in 1995. Nine four-car sets were built by 2000.

=== Refurbishment ===
The fleet underwent a programme of refurbishment from 2017, with the first set, 5501, treated in April 2017. Refurbishment includes the addition of external passenger door control buttons, full-colour LED destination display panels, and a new blue livery.

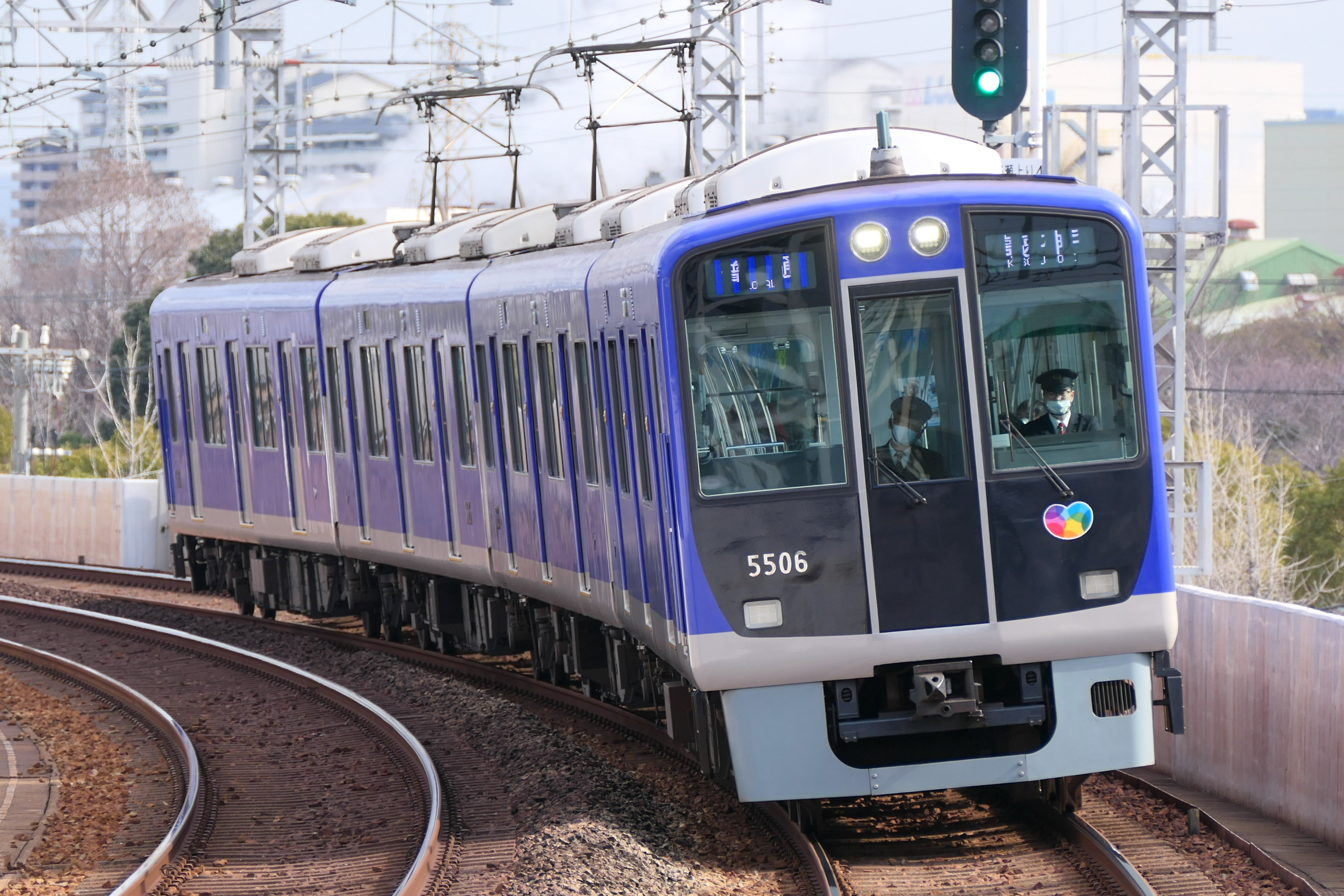
Refurbished set 5505 in January 2021

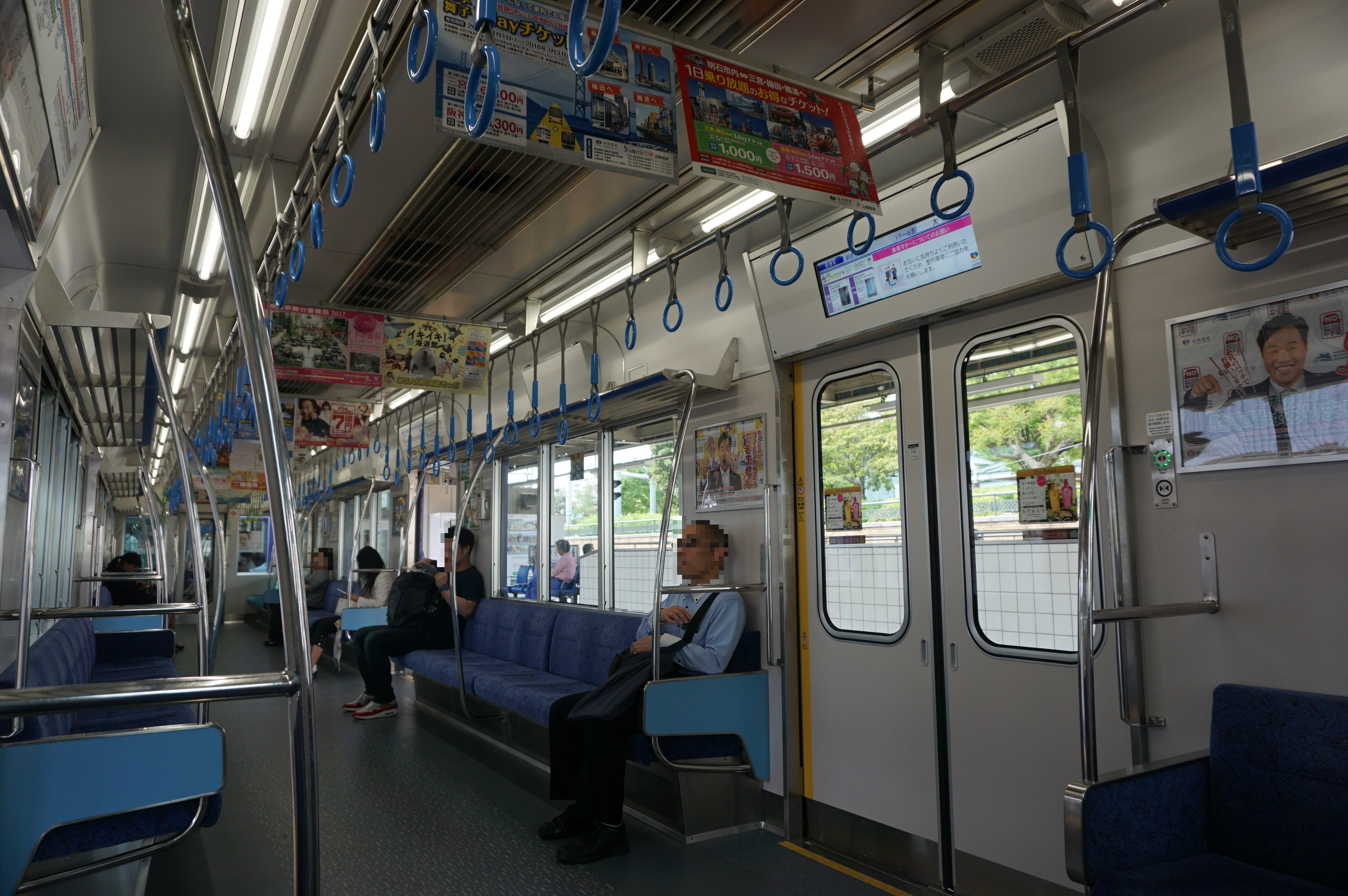
Interior view of a refurbished set

=== Transfer to the Mukogawa Line ===
Hanshin unveiled the first 5500 series set modified for use on the Mukogawa Line in March 2020. The set was modified from set 5513, which was split into two 2-car sets: 5513+5913 and 5514+5914. The 591x cars were fitted with driver's cabs based on those of the 9000 series and two single-arm pantographs. Hanshin confirmed that they would also modify set 5511 as such.

The converted 5500 series sets entered service on the Mukogawa Line on 6 June 2020, replacing the 7861 series sets previously used.

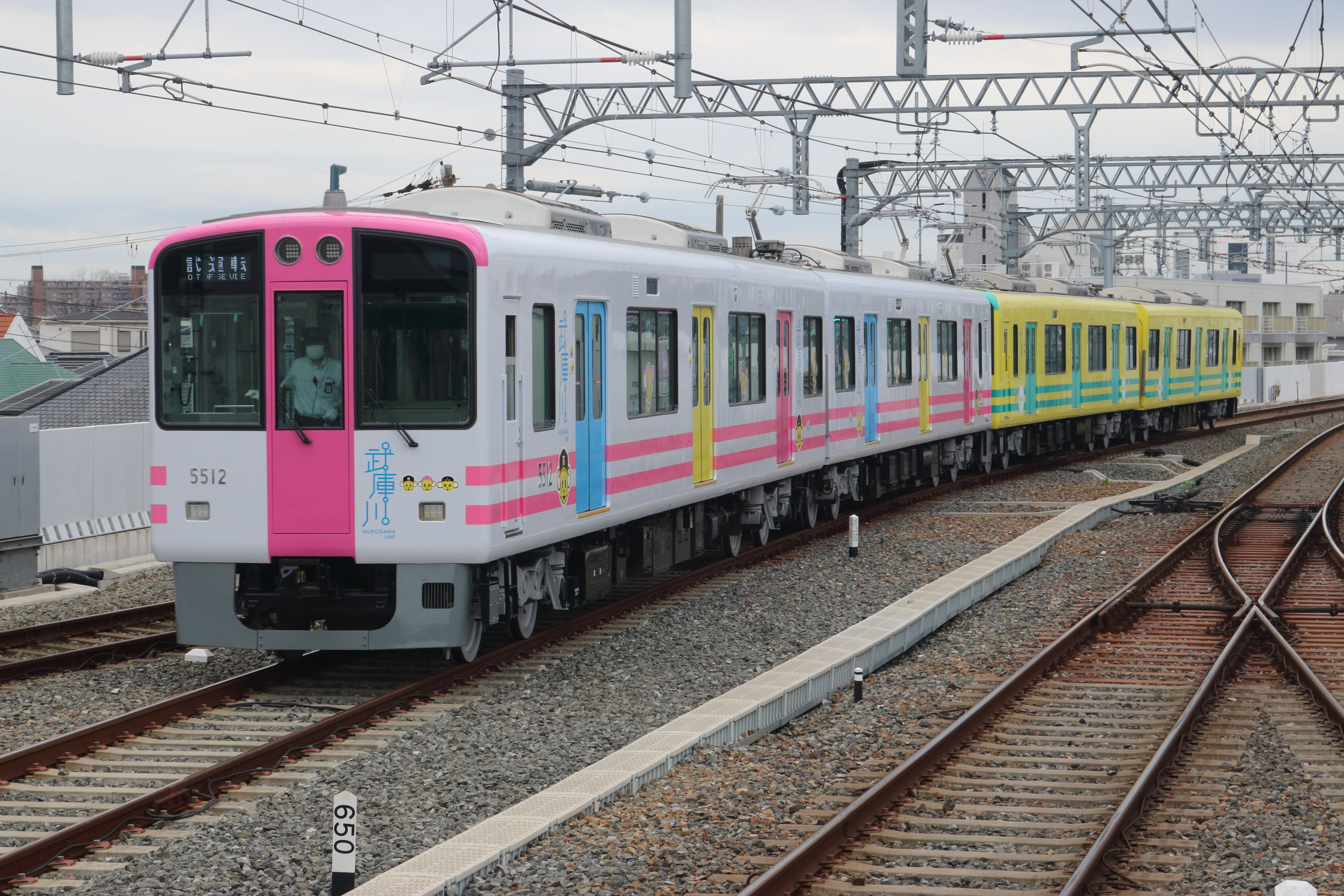
Test run 5511F-5912F

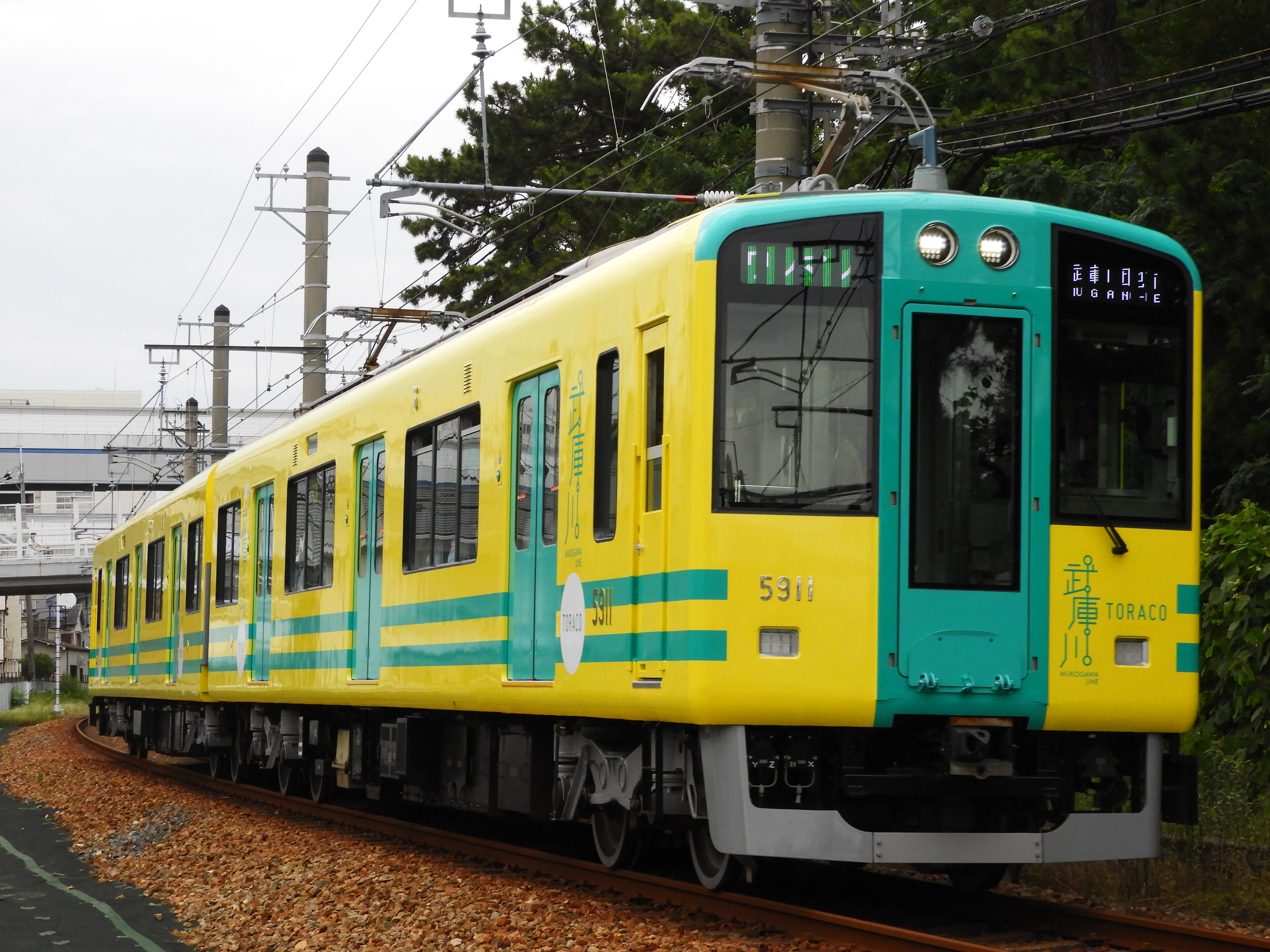
Toraco 5511-5911F

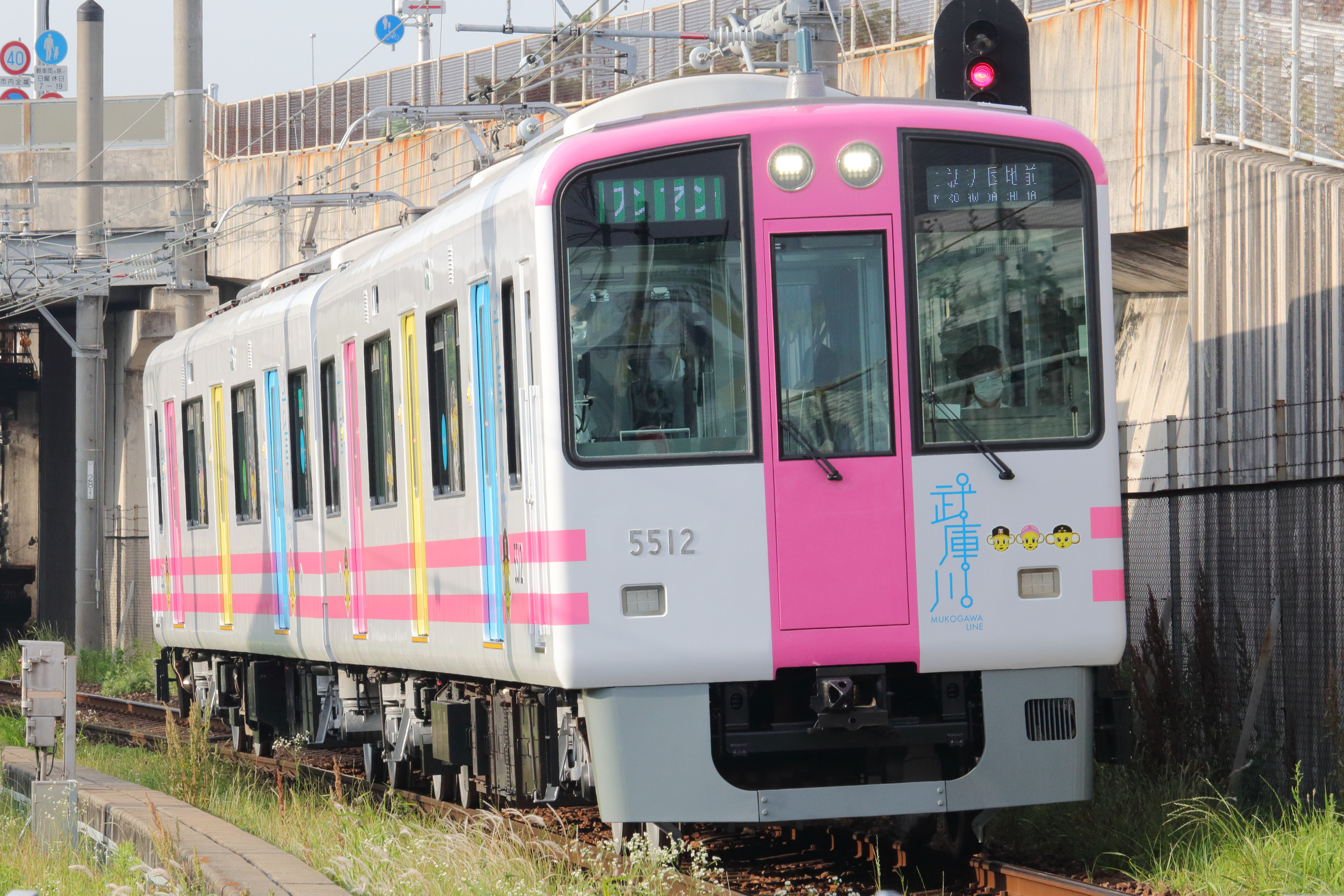
To-lucky 5512F-5912F

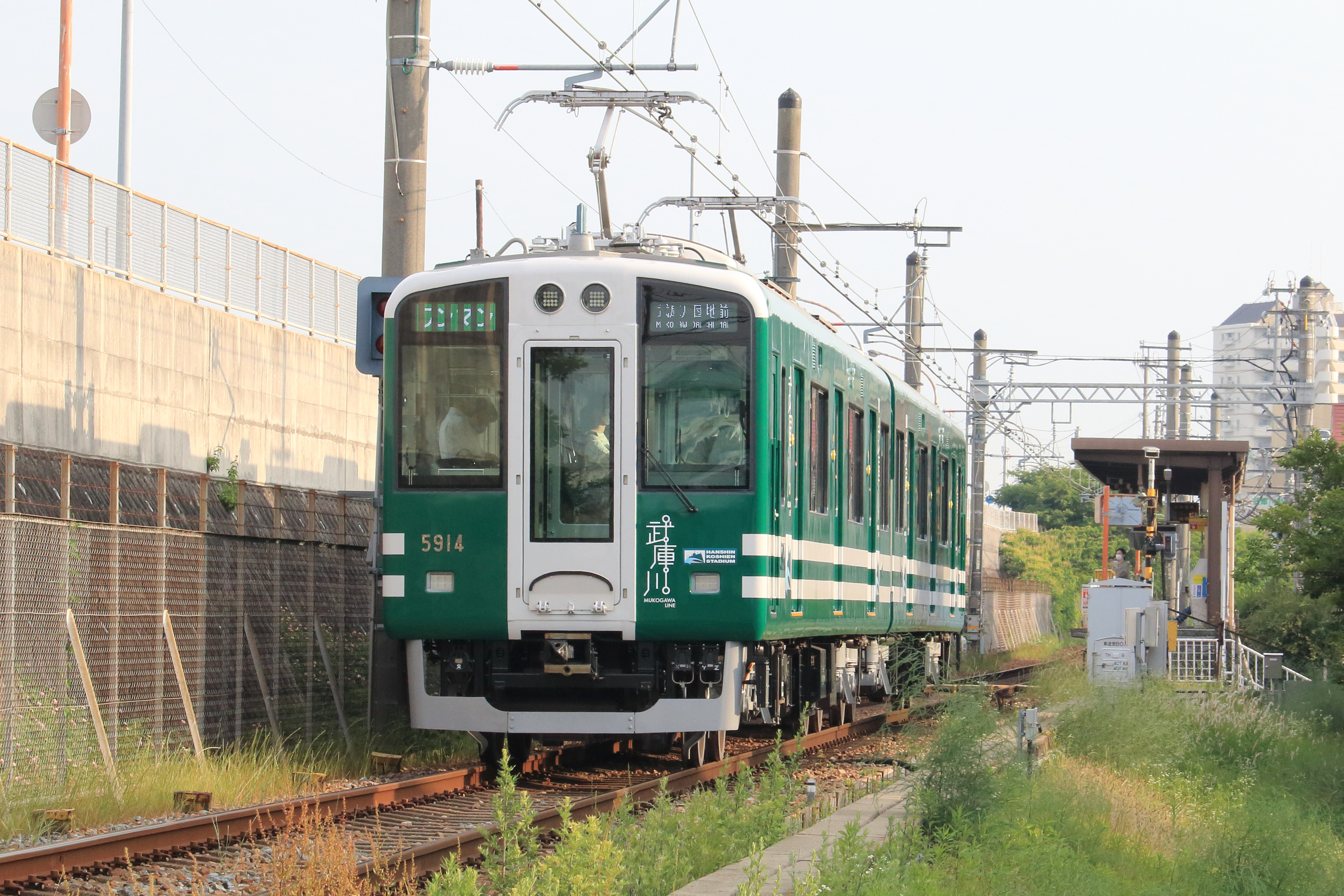
Koshien 5514-5914F
