= Hanshin 5550 series =

Japanese train type

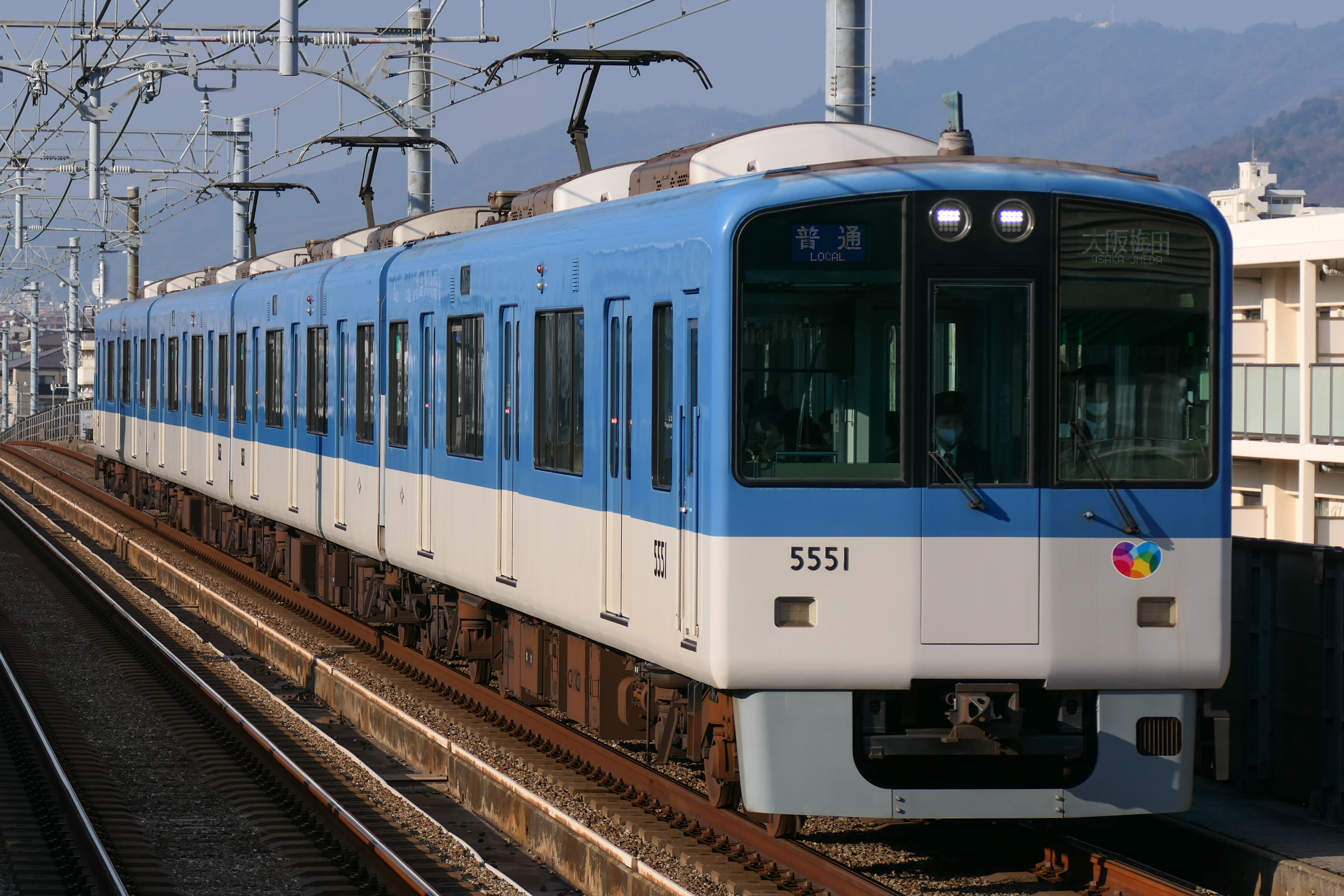
- Set 5551 in December 2021
- Manufacturer: Alna Sharyo, Hanshin Sharyo Maintenance
- Built at: Settsu, Amagasaki
- Family name: Jet Car
- Constructed: 2010
- Entered service: 29 December 2010
- Number built: 4 vehicles (1 set)
- Number in service: 4 vehicles (1 set)
- Formation: 4 cars per trainset
- Operators: Hanshin Electric Railway
- Lines served: Hanshin Main Line

Specifications
- Car body construction: Steel
- Car length: 18,980 mm (62 ft 3 in) (end cars); 18,880 mm (61 ft 11 in) (intermediate cars)
- Width: 2,800 mm (9 ft 2 in)
- Height: 4,085 mm (13 ft 4.8 in)
- Doors: 3 pairs per side
- Maximum speed: 110 km/h (68 mph)
- Traction system: Variable frequency (IGBT)
- Power output: 170 kW per motor
- Acceleration: 4.0 km/(h⋅s) (2.5 mph/s)
- Deceleration: 4.5 km/(h⋅s) (2.8 mph/s)
- Electric system(s): 1,500 V DC (overhead catenary)
- Current collection: Pantograph
- Braking system(s): Electronically controlled pneumatic brakes with regenerative braking
- Safety system(s): Hanshin ATS
- Coupling system: Shibata-type
- Track gauge: 1,435 mm (4 ft 8 1/2 in)

The Hanshin 5550 series (阪神電鉄5550系, Hanshin Dentetsu 5550-kei) is a commuter electric multiple unit (EMU) train operated by the private railway operator Hanshin Electric Railway in Japan since 2010.

== Design ==
The design was based on the earlier 5500 series trains, which were themselves developed from the 8000 series trains. The bogies are the same as those used on the 1000 series trains.

== Operations ==
Together with the 5500 series trains, the 5550 series set is primarily used on Hanshin Main Line services.

== Formation ==
As of 1 April 2015, one four-car set is in service, formed as shown below, with three motored "M" cars and one non-powered trailer "T" car. The "Mc" car is at the Umeda end.

Designation	Mc	M1	M2	Tc
Numbering	5551	5651	5652	5562
Weight (t)	35.5	35.0	35.0	29.0
Capacity Total/seated	124/46	133/50	133/50	124/46

Each motored car is fitted with one single-arm pantograph.

== Interior ==
Passenger accommodation consists of longitudinal bench seating throughout, with sculpted seats finished in blue moquette.

== History ==
The train entered revenue service 29 December 2010.
