= 9300 series =

9300 series may refer to:

== Japanese train types ==
- Hankyu 9300 series electric multiple unit operating for Hankyu Railroad
- Hanshin 9300 series electric multiple unit operating for Hanshin Electric Railway
- Semboku 9300 series electric multiple unit operating for Semboku Rapid Railway
