= Hanshin 1000 series =

Japanese train type

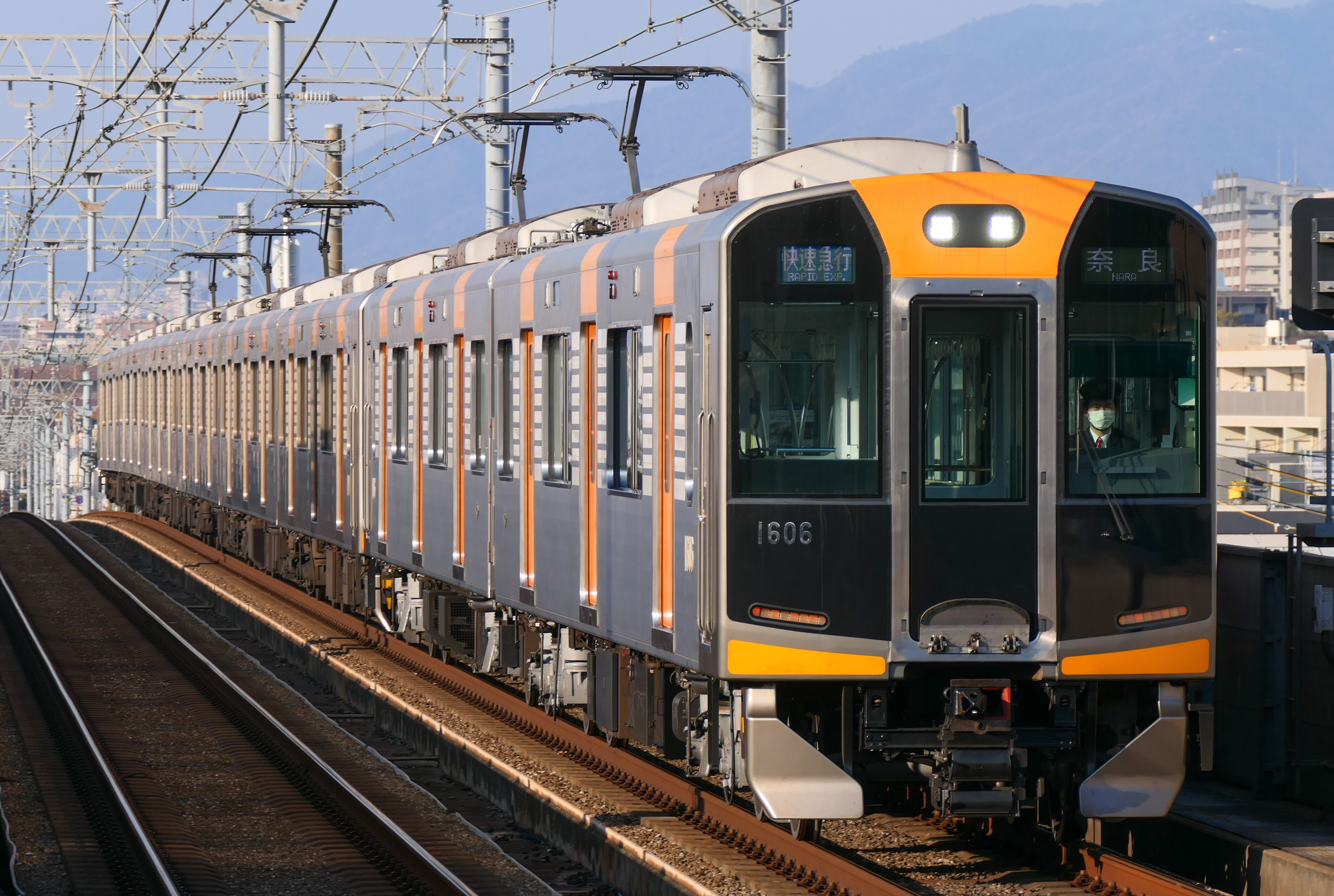
- A 1000 series on a Hanshin Main Line "Rapid Express" service, December 2021
- Manufacturer: Kinki Sharyo
- Built at: Higashiosaka
- Entered service: October 2007
- Number built: 96 vehicles (22 sets)
- Number in service: 96 vehicles (22 sets)
- Formation: 2/6 cars per trainset
- Operator: Hanshin
- Lines served: Main Line; Kobe Kosoku Line; Hanshin Namba Line; A Kintetsu Nara Line; A Kintetsu Namba Line; Sanyo Electric Railway Main Line

Specifications
- Car body construction: Stainless steel
- Car length: 18,980 mm (62 ft 3 in) (end cars); 18,880 mm (61 ft 11 in) (intermediate cars)
- Width: 2,800 mm (9 ft 2 in)
- Height: 4,085 mm (13 ft 4.8 in)
- Doors: 3 pairs per side
- Maximum speed: 110 km/h (68 mph)
- Traction system: Variable frequency (IGBT)
- Power output: 170 kW per motor
- Acceleration: 3.0 km/(h⋅s) (1.9 mph/s)
- Deceleration: 4.0 km/(h⋅s) (2.5 mph/s) (service); 4.3 km/(h⋅s) (2.7 mph/s) (emergency)
- Electric system: 1,500 V DC overhead catenary
- Current collection: Single-arm pantograph
- Bogies: SS171M (motored); SS171T (trailer)
- Braking system: Electronically controlled pneumatic brakes with regenerative braking
- Safety systems: Hanshin ATS; Kintetsu ATS (old/new)
- Coupling system: Shibata-type
- Multiple working: 9000 series
- Track gauge: 1,435 mm (4 ft 8 1/2 in)

The Hanshin 1000 series (阪神電鉄1000系) is a commuter electric multiple unit (EMU) train type operated by the private railway operator Hanshin Electric Railway in Japan since 2007.

== Design ==
The design was based on the earlier 9000 series trains, formed as six- and two-car sets. The motored cars are mounted on SS171M bogies, and the non-powered trailer cars use SS171T bogies.

== Operations ==
The 1000 series sets are used on through-running services over Kintetsu lines, and are able to operate in multiple with 9000 series trains, running as up to 10-car formations.

== Formations ==
As of 1 April 2014, the fleet consists of thirteen six-car sets, numbered 1201 to 1213, and nine two-car sets, numbered 1501 to 1509.

=== 6-car sets ===
The thirteen six-car sets are formed as shown below, with three motored "M" cars and three non-powered trailer "T" cars.

Designation	Tc1	M1	M2	T	M3	Tc2
Numbering	1200	1000	1100	1300	1050	1250
Weight (t)	29.5	35.0	32.5	25.5	35.0	29.5
Capacity Total/seated	123/44	133/50	133/50	133/50	133/50	123/44

Each motored car is fitted with one PT7160-A single-arm pantograph.

=== 2-car sets ===
The nine two-car sets are formed as shown below, with one motored "M" car and one non-powered trailer "T" car.

Designation	Tc	Mc
Numbering	1600	1500
Weight (t)	29.5	37.5
Capacity Total/seated	123/44	123/44

The motored cars are fitted with two PT7160-A single-arm pantographs.

== Interior ==
Passenger accommodation consists of longitudinal bench seating throughout, with sculpted seats finished in olive green moquette.

== History ==
The first train entered revenue service in October 2007.

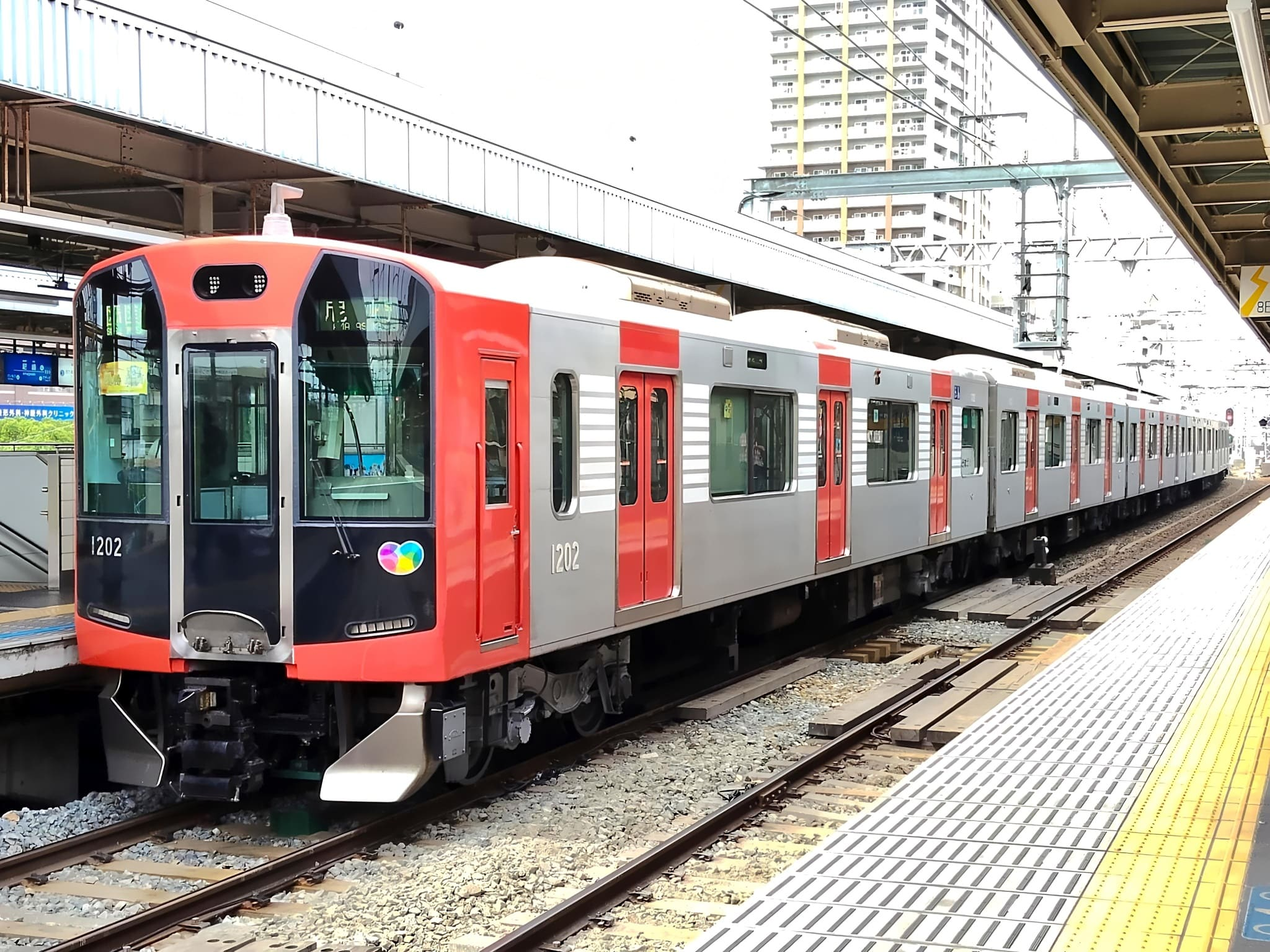
Set 1202 in "Re Vermilion" livery in September 2025

The fleet is scheduled to gradually receive a new "Re Vermillion" colour scheme based on that of the to-be-introduced 3000 series trains. The first set to receive the updated livery, 1202, returned to service on 29 August 2025.
