= Hanshin 8000 series =

Japanese train type

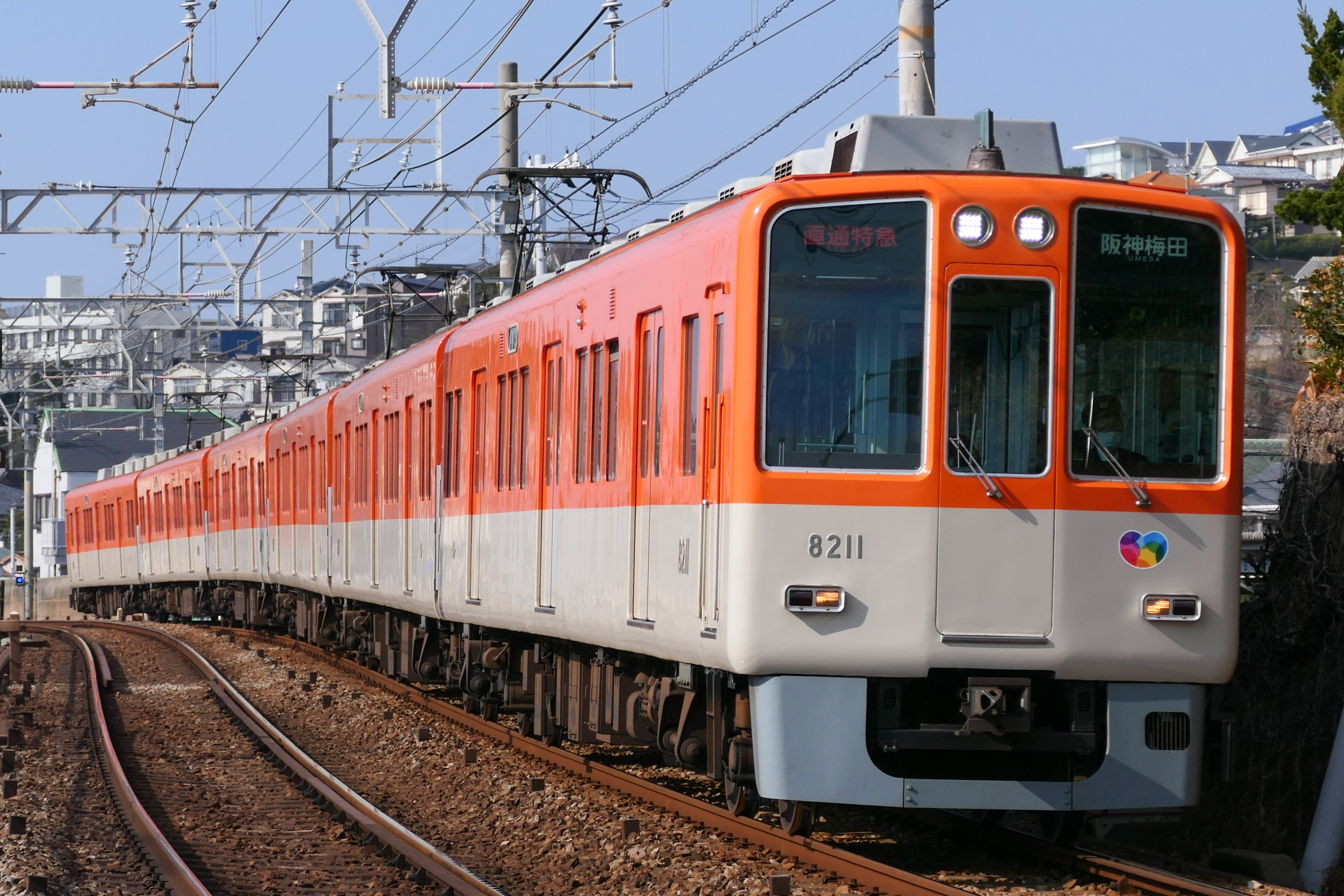
- Refurbished set 8211 in January 2021
- In service: 1984–present
- Manufacturer: Mukogawa Sharyo
- Entered service: 31 March 1984
- Refurbished: 2001–2015
- Number built: 129 vehicles (22 sets)
- Number in service: 114 vehicles (19 sets)
- Number scrapped: 15 vehicles (earthquake damage)
- Formation: 6 cars per trainset
- Fleet numbers: 8201, 8211–8221, 8523, 8225–8249
- Capacity: 140 (end cars), 150 (intermediate cars)
- Operators: Hanshin
- Lines served: Main Line; Kobe Kosoku Line; Sanyo Electric Railway Main Line

Specifications
- Car body construction: Steel
- Car length: 18,980 mm (62 ft 3 in) (most cars); 18,880 mm (61 ft 11 in) (end cars)
- Width: 2,800 mm (9 ft 2 in)
- Height: 4,087 mm (13 ft 4.9 in) (up to set 8215); 4,160 mm (13 ft 8 in) (set 8217 and on)
- Doors: 3 pairs per side
- Maximum speed: 110 km/h (68.4 mph)
- Traction system: Field chopper
- Power output: 110 kW per motor
- Acceleration: 4.0 km/(h⋅s) (2.5 mph/s)
- Deceleration: 4.5 km/(h⋅s) (2.8 mph/s) (service); 5 km/(h⋅s) (3.1 mph/s) (emergency)
- Electric system(s): 1,500 V DC overhead catenary
- Current collector(s): Pantograph
- Braking system(s): Regenerative brake, electronically controlled pneumatic brakes
- Safety system(s): Hanshin ATS, Sanyo ATS
- Coupling system: Shibata-type
- Track gauge: 1,435 mm (4 ft 8 1/2 in)

The Hanshin 8000 series (阪神電鉄8000系, Hanshin Dentetsu 8000-kei) is a commuter electric multiple unit (EMU) train type operated by the private railway operator Hanshin Electric Railway in Japan since 1984.

== Formation ==
As of 1 April 2016, nineteen six-car sets (numbered 8211 to 8249) are in service, formed as shown below, with car 1 at the Umeda end. Four cars are powered.

Car No.	1	2	3	4	5	6
Designation	Tc1	M1'	M	M	M'	Tc2
Numbering	82xx (odd)	80xx (odd)	81xx (odd)	81xx (even)	80xx (even)	82xx (even)
Capacity (Total)	140	150				140

Cars 2 to 5 each have one lozenge-style pantograph.

Four sets break the numbering rule as shown above; sets 8213, 8221, 8523 and 8235, due to random cars from random sets being inserted into these four sets to replace cars scrapped due to heavy damage from the quakes, along with the insertion of some new-build cars in these sets.

=== Set 8213 ===
All six cars are original-build cars.

Car No.	1	2	3	4	5	6
Designation	Tc1	M1'	M	M	M'	Tc2
Numbering	8213	8013	8117	8118	8018	8218
Capacity Total	140	150				140

=== Set 8221 ===
All six cars are original-build cars.

Car No.	1	2	3	4	5	6
Designation	Tc1	M1'	M	M	M'	Tc2
Numbering	8221	8021	8121	8122	8022	8214
Capacity Total	140	150				140

=== Set 8523 ===
Set 8523 contains one new-build car, 8523, and a car sourced from the prototype set, 8201 (renumbered 8502). 8502 still retains its original appearance.

Car No.	1	2	3	4	5	6
Designation	Tc1	M1'	M	M	M'	Tc2
Numbering	8523	8023	8123	8102	8002	8502 (ex-8201)
Capacity Total	140	150				140

=== Set 8235 ===
Set 8235 contains two new-build cars, 8336 and 8536, while the rest of the cars are original-build.

Car No.	1	2	3	4	5	6
Designation	Tc1	M1'	M	M	M'	Tc2
Numbering	8235	8035	8135	8136	8336	8536
Capacity Total	140	150				140

== Interior ==
Passenger accommodation consists of 2+2 transverse seating in some cars and longitudinal bench seating in others.

== History ==
The 8000 series was built by Mukogawa Sharyo to replace aging rolling stock on Hanshin lines. Like the 3301 series and 3501 series trains, the sets were finished in a livery of cream and vermilion. A prototype set, 8201, was built in 1984 based on the 3901 series set 3905. 11 sets were damaged during the 1995 Great Hanshin Earthquake; 15 cars spanning across all 11 sets were heavily damaged by the quakes and were scrapped. There were no sets with all six cars scrapped due to heavy damage by the quakes, and as such, the remaining cars from those sets were randomly inserted into various sets, with additional newly built cars.

=== Refurbishment ===
From 2001 to 2015, the entire fleet of 8000 series sets underwent a period of refurbishment. Changes included a new color scheme of breast orange and silky beige resembling that of later 9300 series cars, the replacements of longitudinal bench seats in some cars with transverse seating, LED headlights and LED destination boards. The first set to undergo refurbishment, 8211, was returned to service on 11 April 2002. The last set to undergo refurbishment, 8239, was returned to service in October 2015.

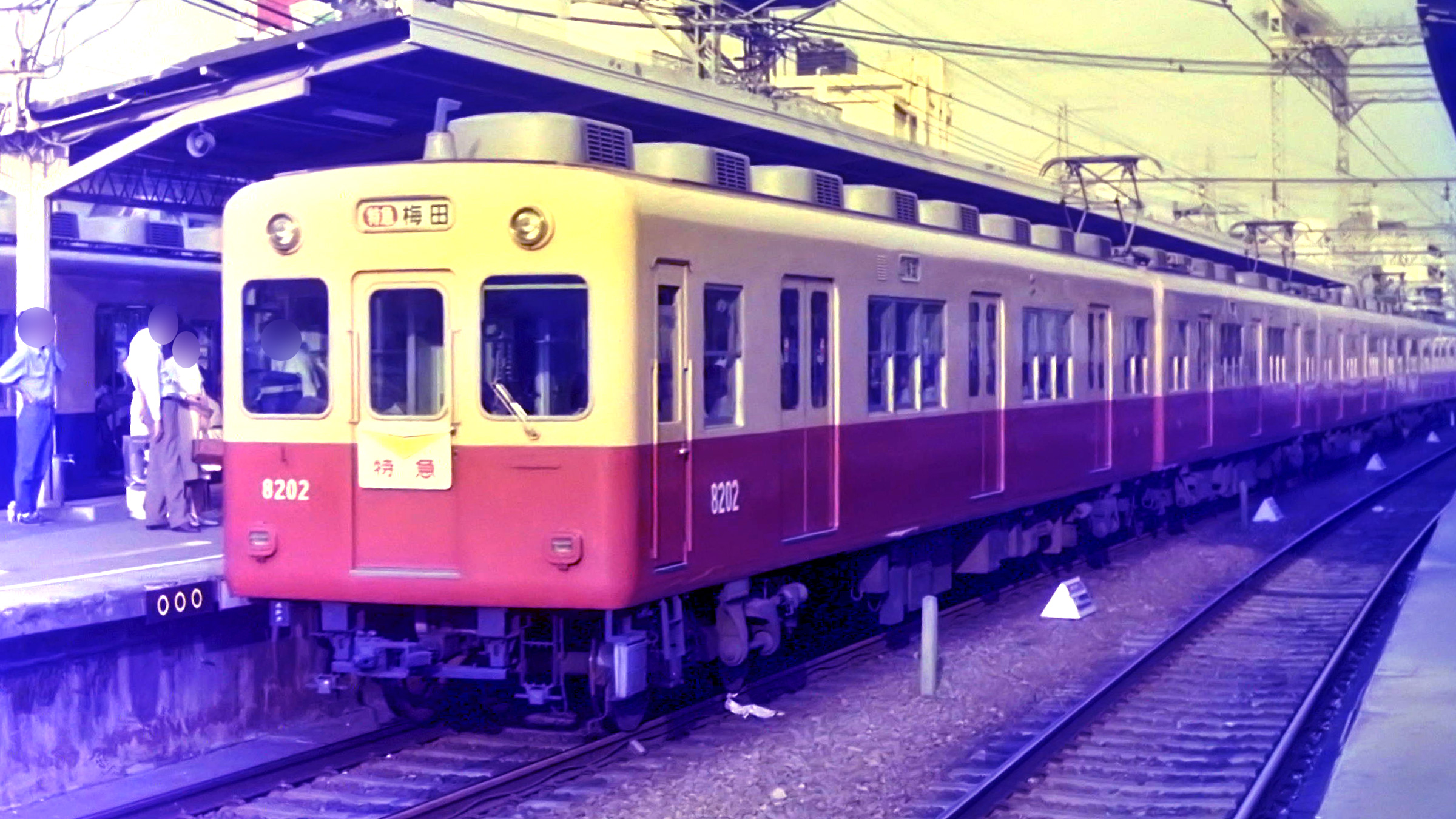
Prototype set 8201 at Nishinomiya Station in 1985

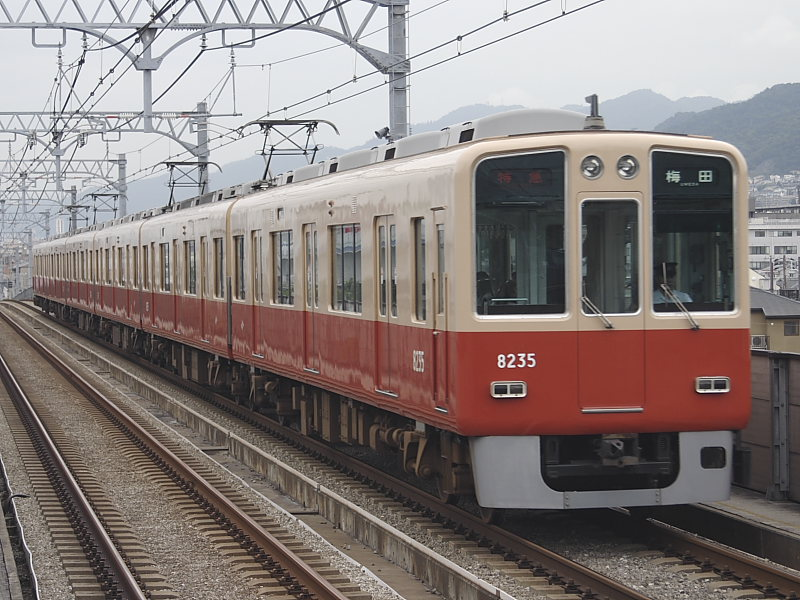
Unrefurbished set 8235 in July 2007

Prototype car 8201 (renumbered as 8502) in 2014

=== Future plans ===
Starting in 2025, the entire fleet of 8000 series sets is scheduled to be repainted back into the original livery used prior to refurbishment. This repainting programme is set to take place for a period of three to four years. Set 8215 will be the first set to receive the original livery.
