= Hanshin Electric Railway =

Japanese railway company

Overview
- Parent company: Hankyu Hanshin Holdings (Hankyu Hanshin Toho Group)
- Headquarters: Osaka, Japan
- Locale: Kansai region, Japan
- Dates of operation: 1905 (established in 1899)–

Technical
- Track gauge: 1,435 mm (4 ft 8 1/2 in)
- Length: 48.9 km (30.4 mi)

Other
- Website: rail.hanshin.co.jp

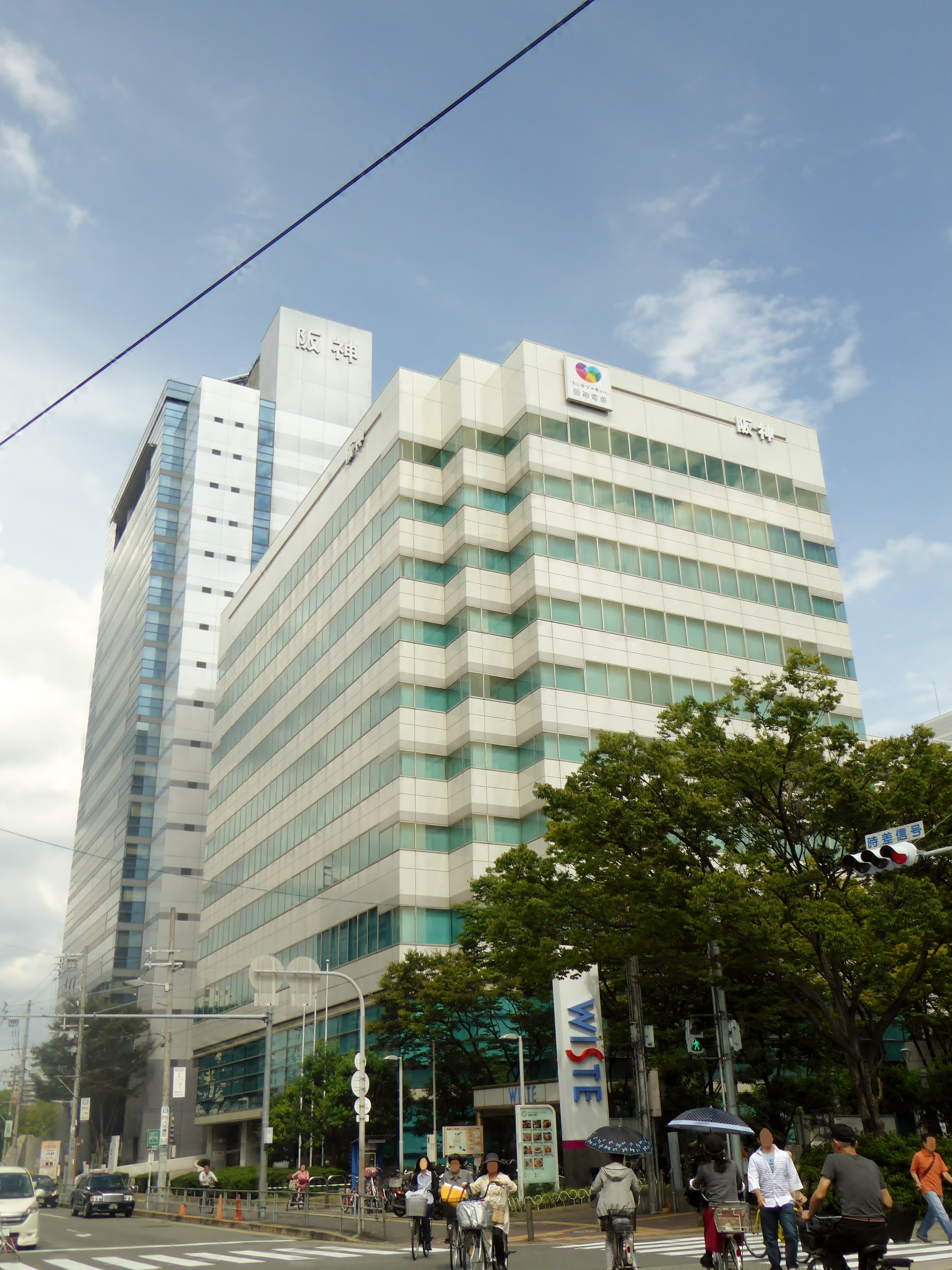
Corporate headquarters of Hanshin

Hanshin Electric Railway Co., Ltd. (阪神電気鉄道株式会社, Hanshin Denki-tetsudō Kabushiki-gaisha) is a Japanese private railway company owned by Hankyu Hanshin Toho Group. Its lines serve to link the cities of Osaka and Kobe in the Hanshin region of Japan. The first character from Kobe (神戸) and the second character from Osaka (大阪) combine to form the company name, 阪神, read as Han-shin.

The company also owns the Hanshin Tigers baseball team, which plays in the Central League and is based in Nishinomiya, Hyōgo Prefecture.

IC cards, including ICOCA and PiTaPa, are accepted on all trains.

== Rail lines ==
Line map of Hanshin Electric Railway

=== Operating lines ===
- Main Line (本線) (Umeda – Motomachi, 32.1 km)
- Hanshin Namba Line (阪神なんば線) (Amagasaki – Ōsaka Namba, 10.1 km)

The section between Nishikujō and Ōsaka-Namba is the newest segment, having opened on March 20, 2009. Prior to this extension, the line was called the Nishi-Ōsaka Line.

- Mukogawa Line (武庫川線) (Mukogawa – Mukogawa-danchimae, 1.7 km)
- Kobe Kosoku Line (神戸高速線) (Category-2, Motomachi – Nishidai, 5.0 km)

The tracks of the line are owned by Kobe Rapid Transit Railway, called the Tōzai Line.

=== Abandoned lines ===
- Kita-Osaka Line (北大阪線) (Noda – Tenjimbashisuji Rokuchome)
- Kokudo Line (国道線) (Noda – Higashi-Kobe)
- Koshien Line (甲子園線) (Kamikoshien – Kōshien – Hamakoshien – Nakatsuhama)
- Amagasaki Kaigan Line (尼崎海岸線) (Deyashiki – Higashihama)
- Mukogawa Line (武庫川線) (Mukogawa – Muko-ohashi – Nishinomiya): the line between Muko-ohashi and Nishinomiya was used only for freight trains operated by JNR.

=== Incomplete lines ===
- Imazu Deyashiki Line (今津出屋敷線): Takasu – Suzaki - Hamakoshien – Imazu
- Amagasaki Takarazuka Line (尼崎宝塚線): Amagasaki – Takarazuka (formerly under Takarazuka–Amagasaki Electric Railway)
- Daini Hanshin Line: Umeda - Chidoribashi - Amagasaki – Sannomiya – Minatogawa

== History ==
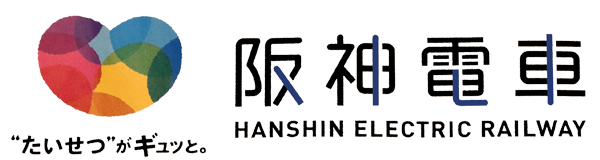
Former marketing logo until 2024

- June 12, 1899: Settsu Electric Railway Co., Ltd. (摂津電気鉄道株式会社, Settsu Denki-tetsudō Kabushiki-gaisha) was established.
- July 7, 1899: The company was renamed "Hanshin Electric Railway Co., Ltd."
- April 7, 1968: Kobe Rapid Railway was opened and joint operation with Sanyo Electric Railway was started.
- February 15, 1998: Joint operation with Sanyo Electric Railway for limited express service between Umeda and Himeji was started.
- June 20, 2006: Hankyu Holdings, Inc. completed its purchase of a controlling interest in Hanshin in a transaction valued at about $2.2 billion.
- March 20, 2009: Joint operation with Kintetsu Railway for Rapid Express service between Sannomiya and Kintetsu Nara was started.

== Rolling stock ==
=== Limited Express/Express ===
- 1000 series - through services onto the Kintetsu Nara Line
- 8000 series
- 9000 series - through services onto the Kintetsu Nara Line
- 9300 series
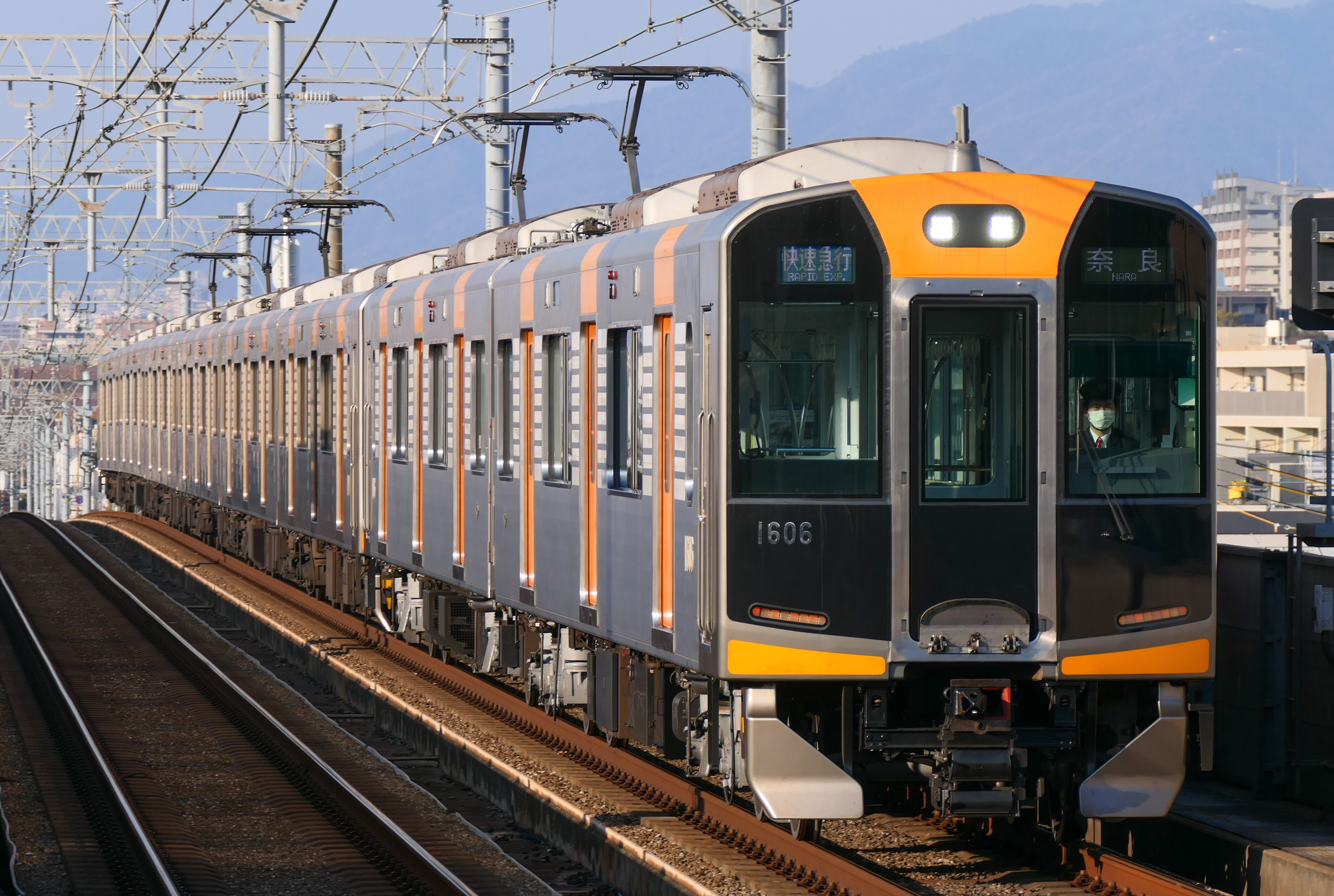
1000 series

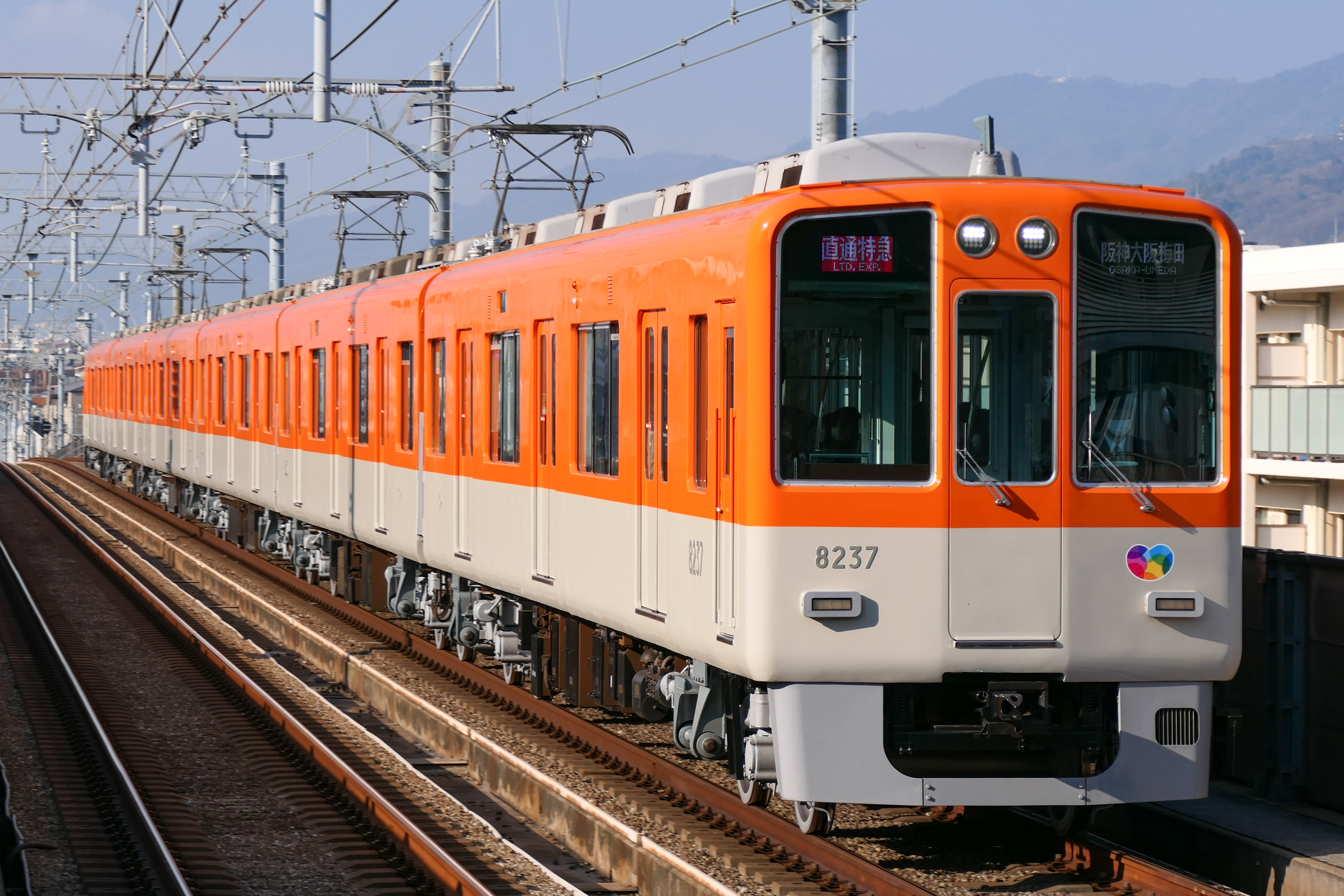
8000 series

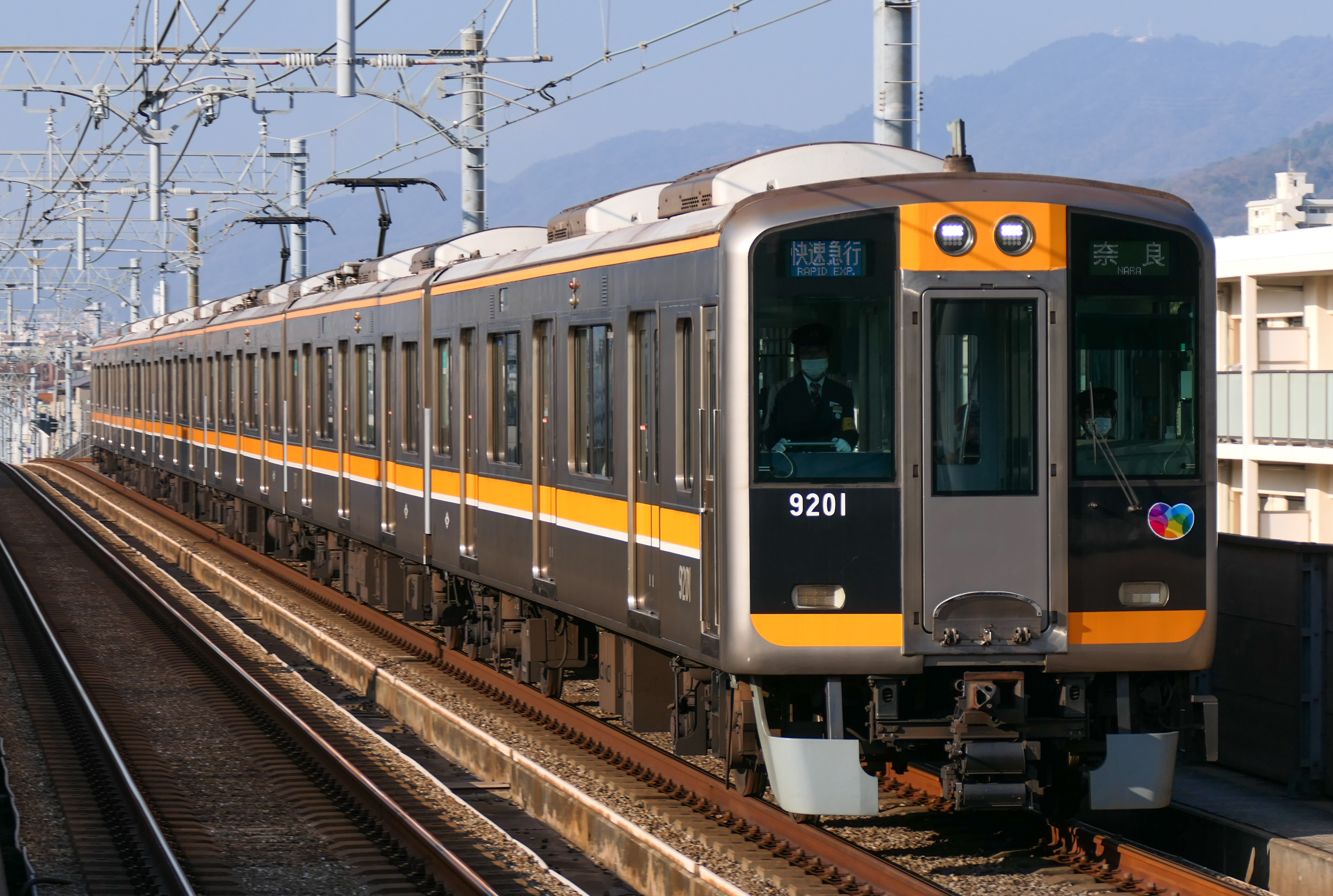
9000 series

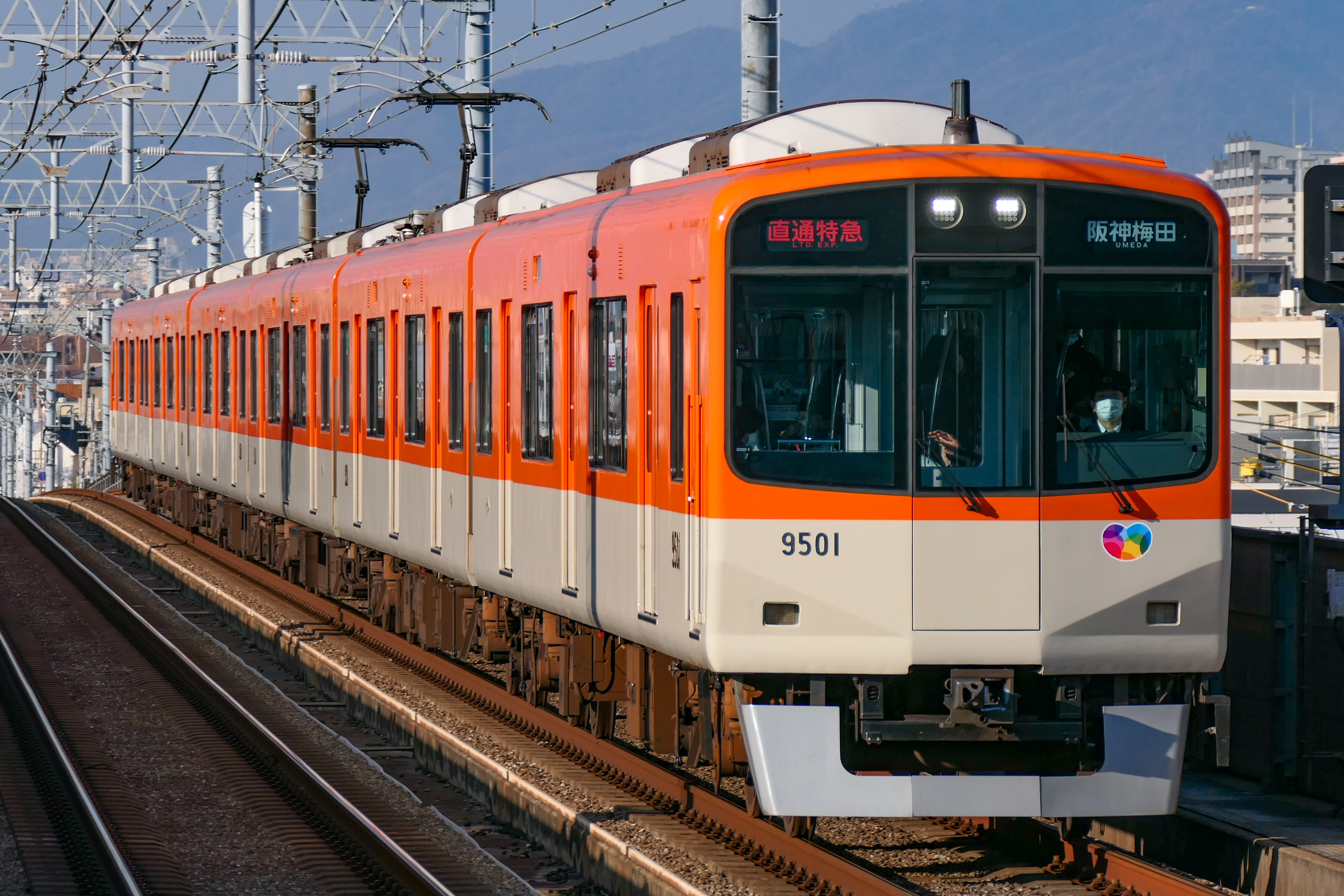
9300 series

=== Local ===
- 5001
- 5131/5331
- 5500 series
- 5550 series (since January 2010)
- 5700 series (since August 2015) (2016 Blue Ribbon Award winner)
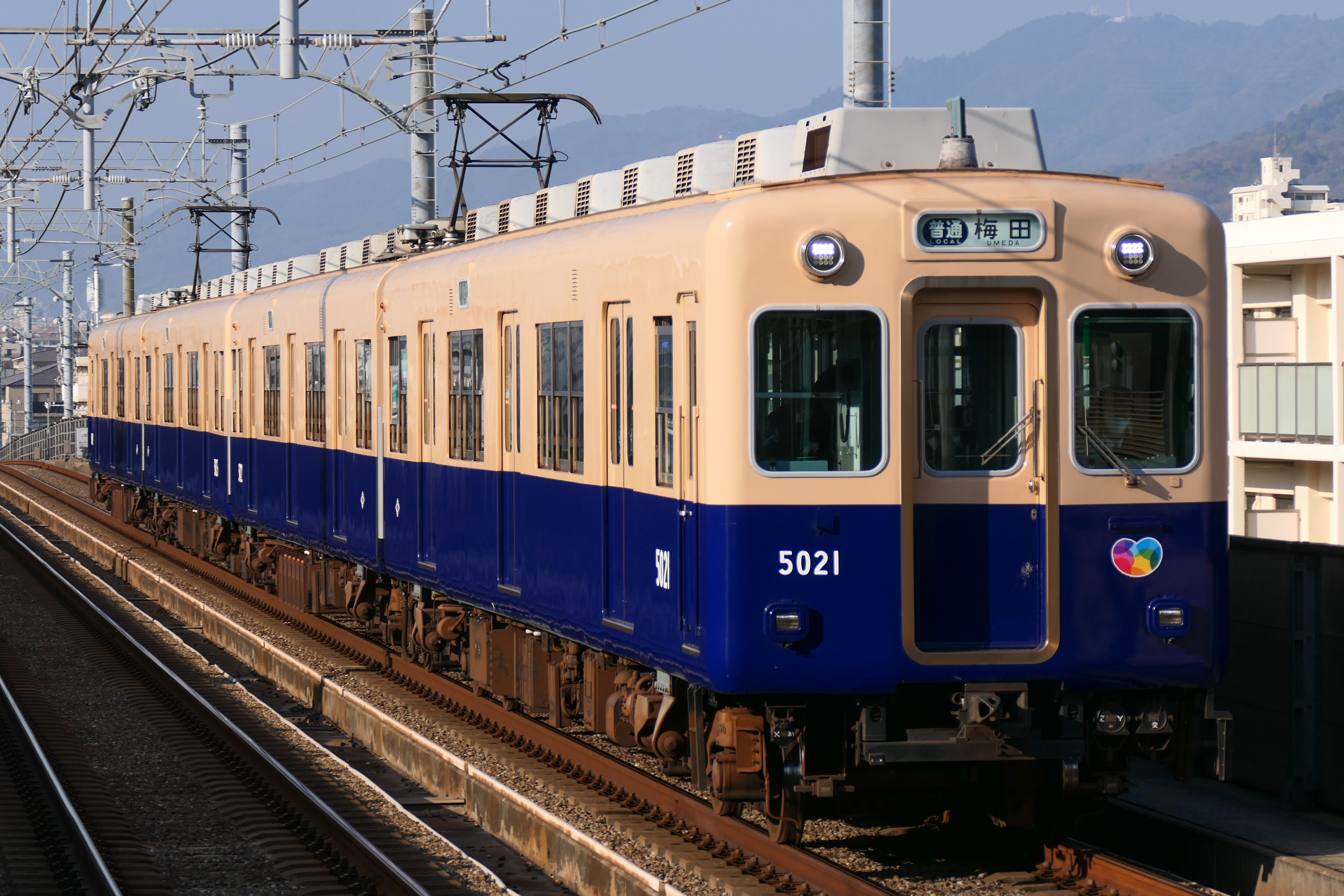
5001

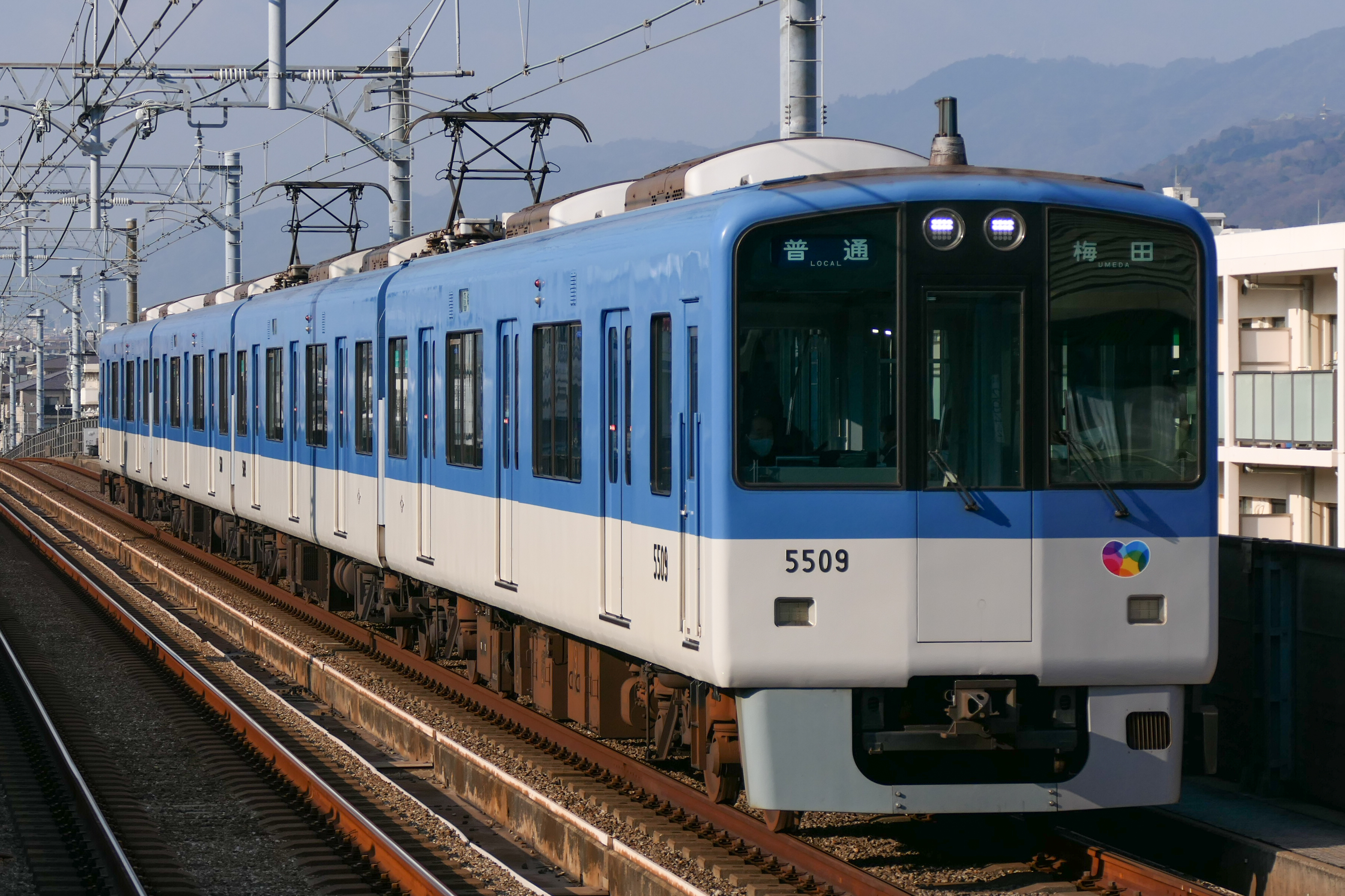
5500 series

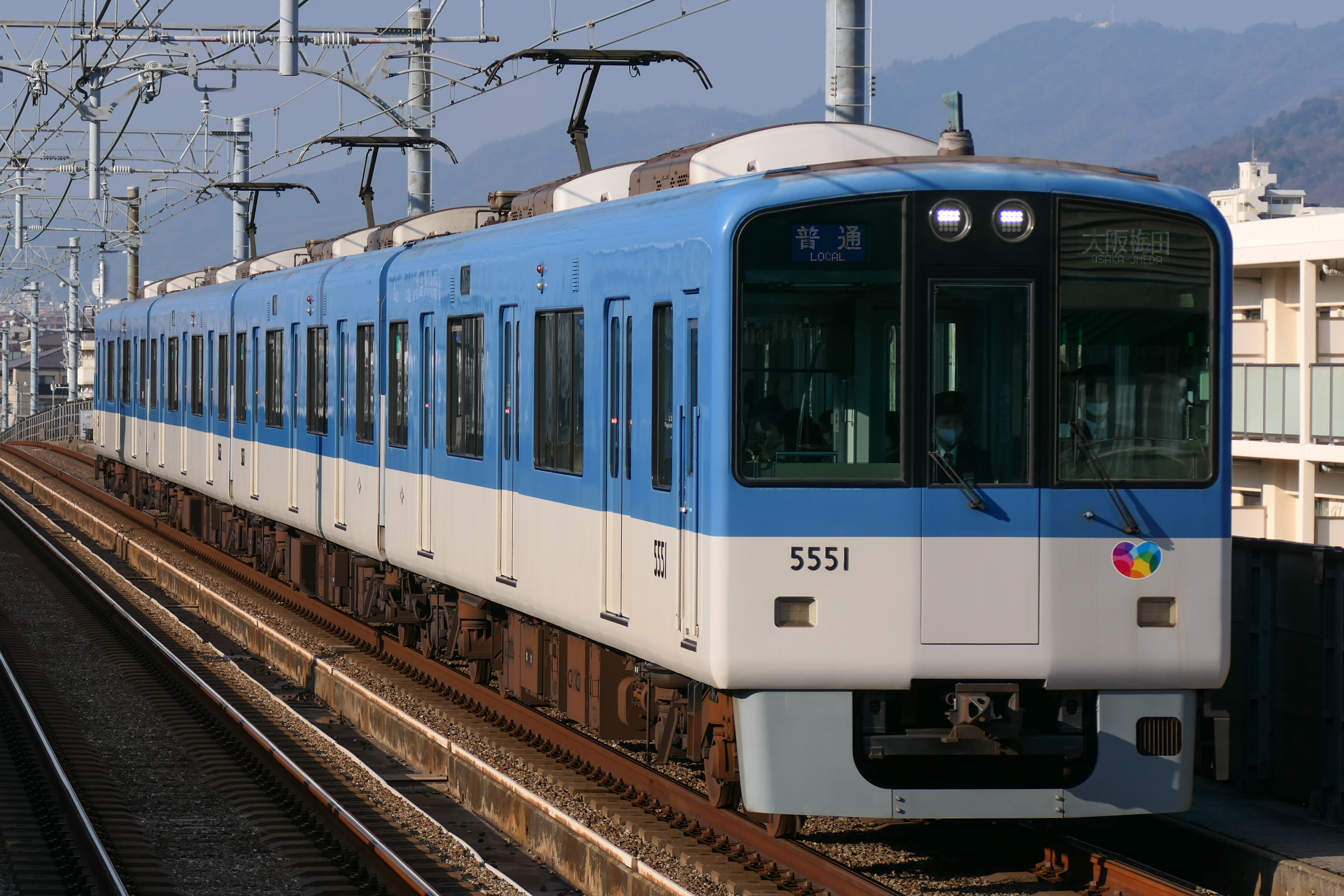
5550 series

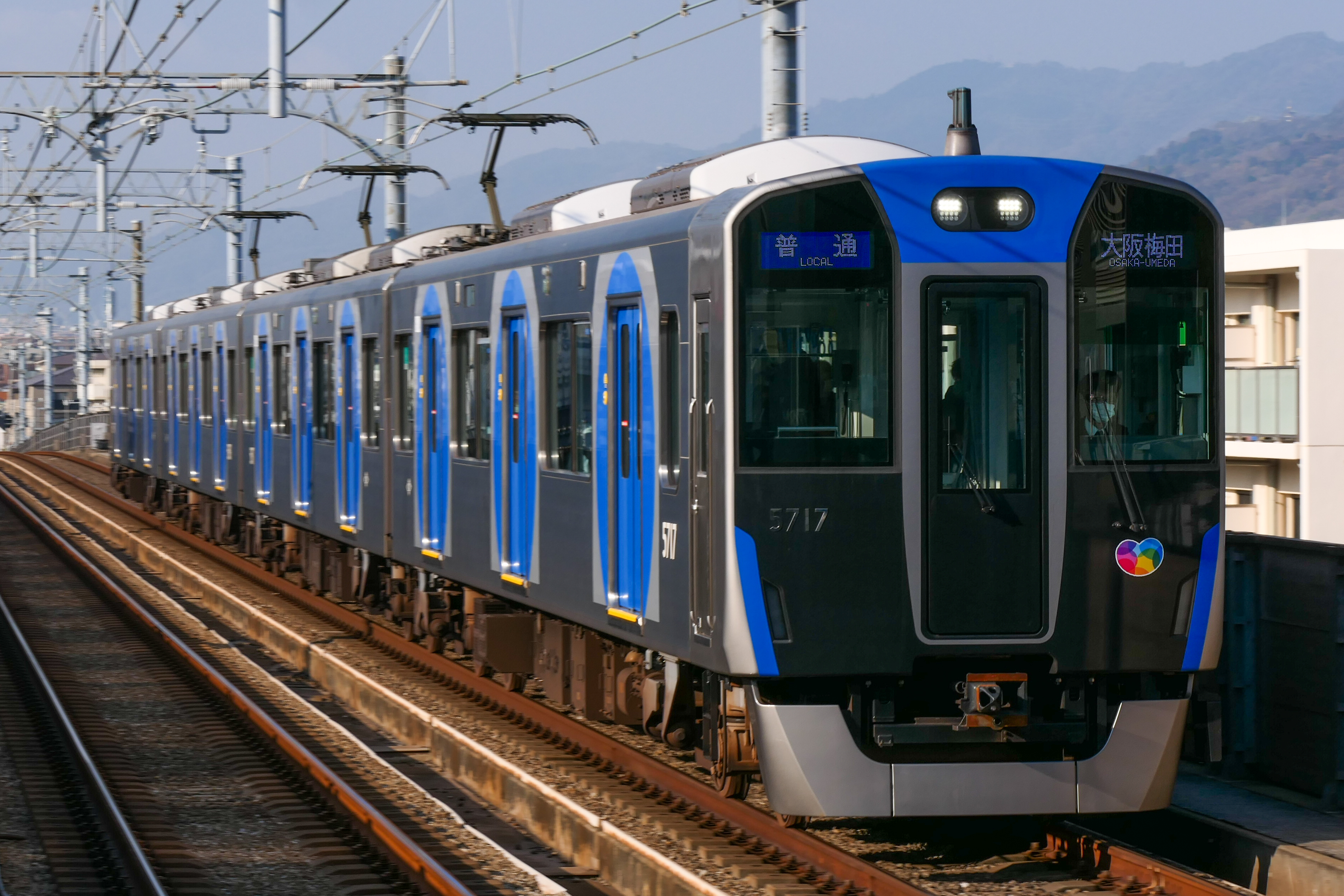
5700 series

=== Mukogawa Line ===
- 7861
- 7890/7990
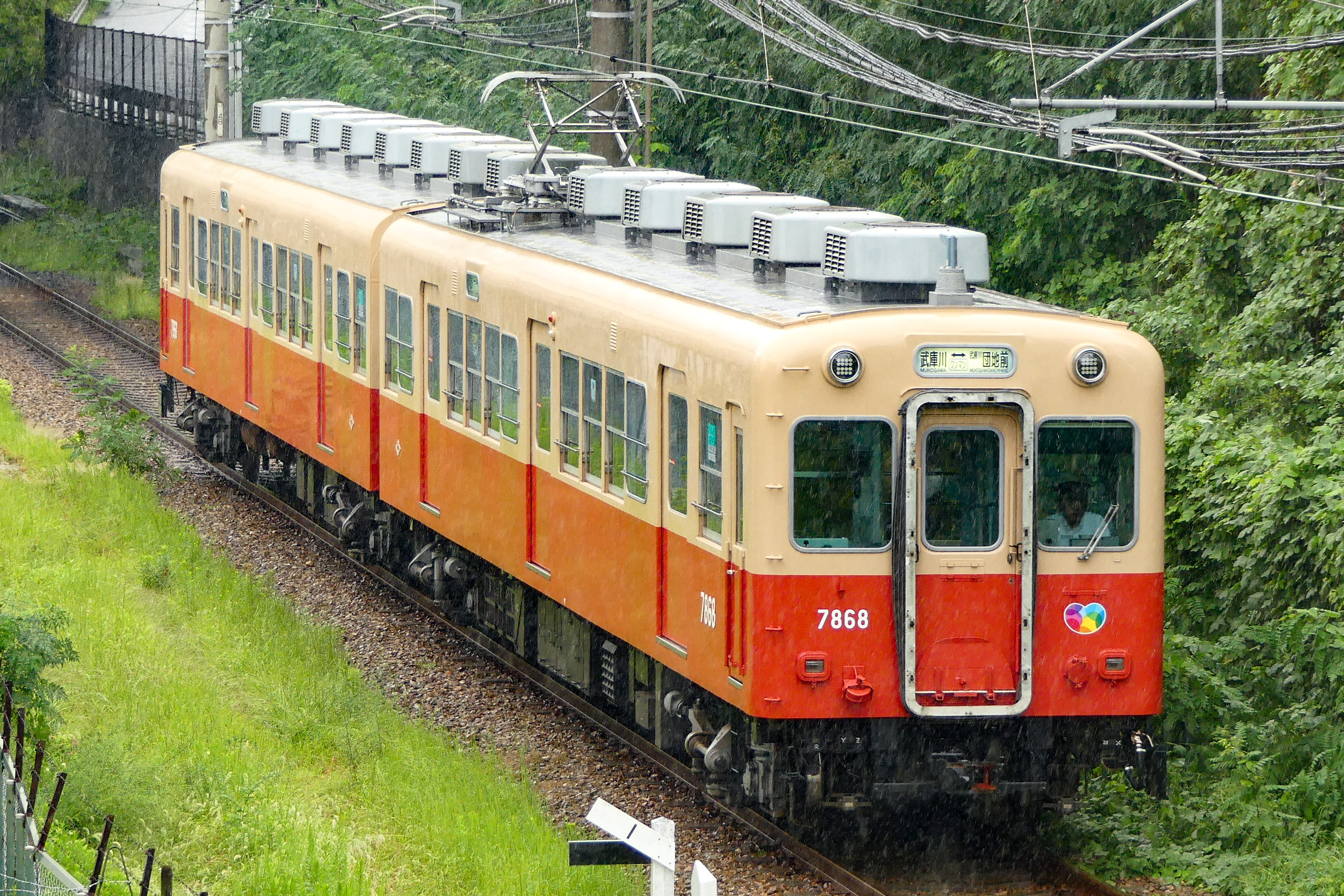
7861

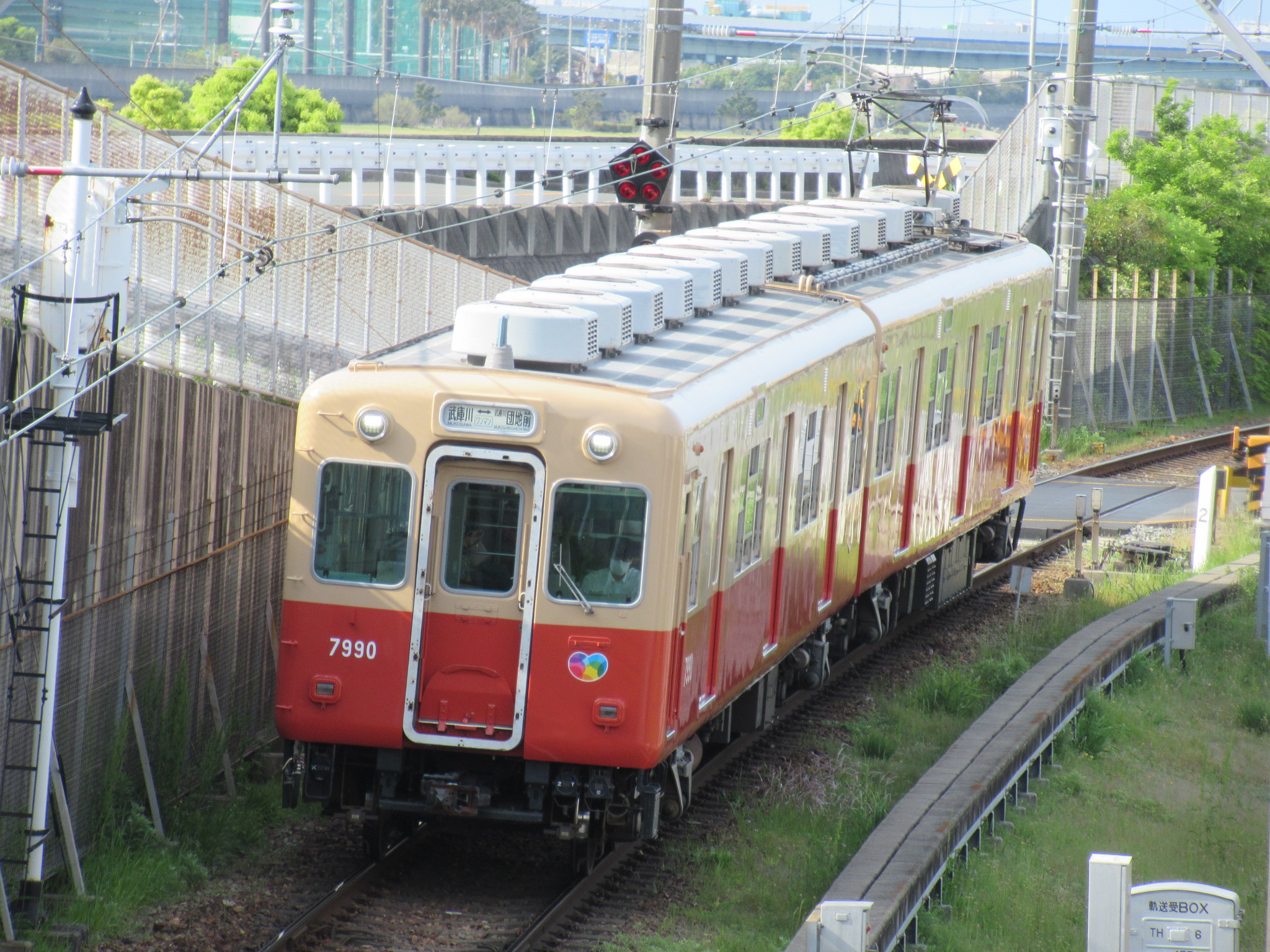
7890/7990
(Retirement)

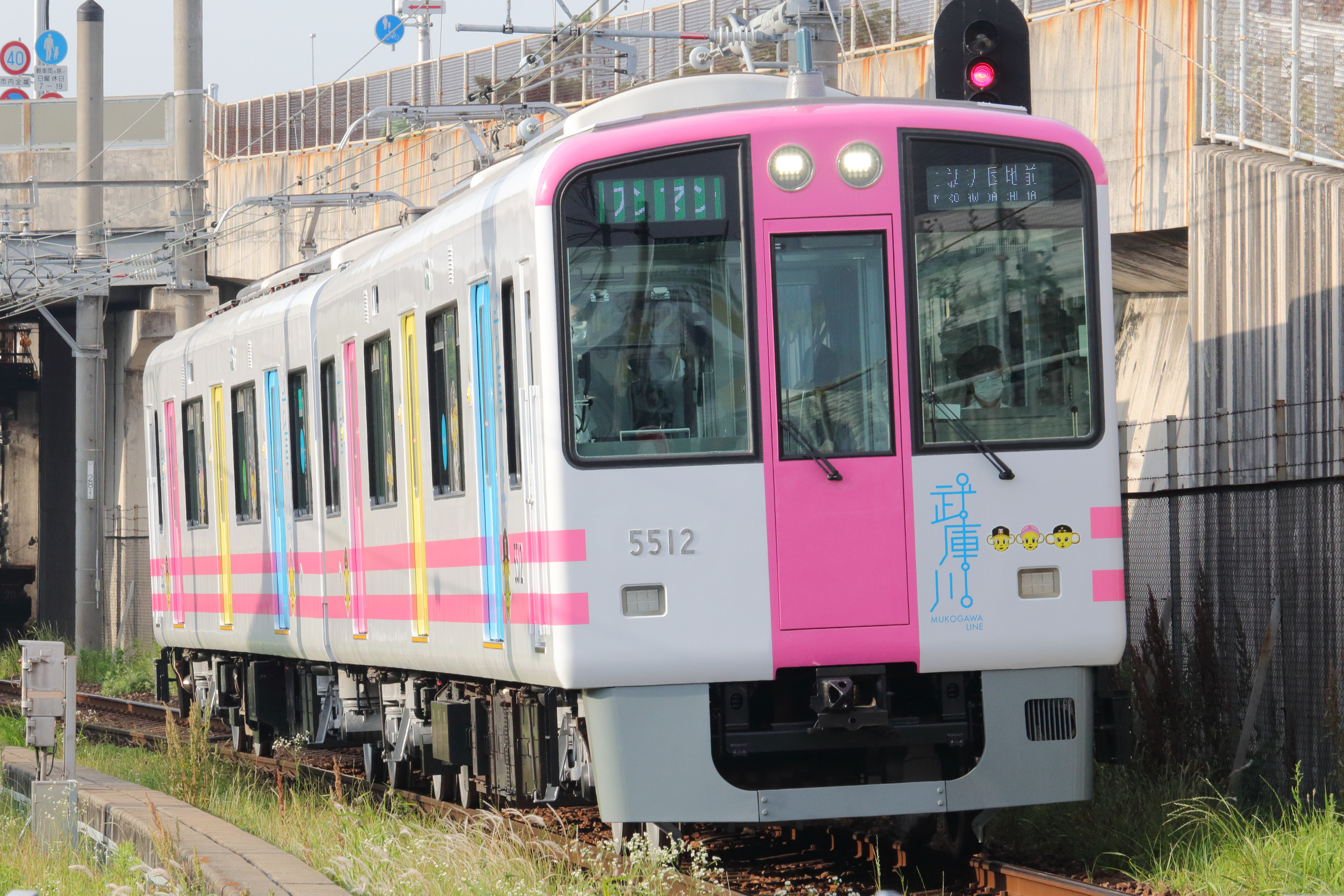
Series 5500
To-lucky 5511F-5912F

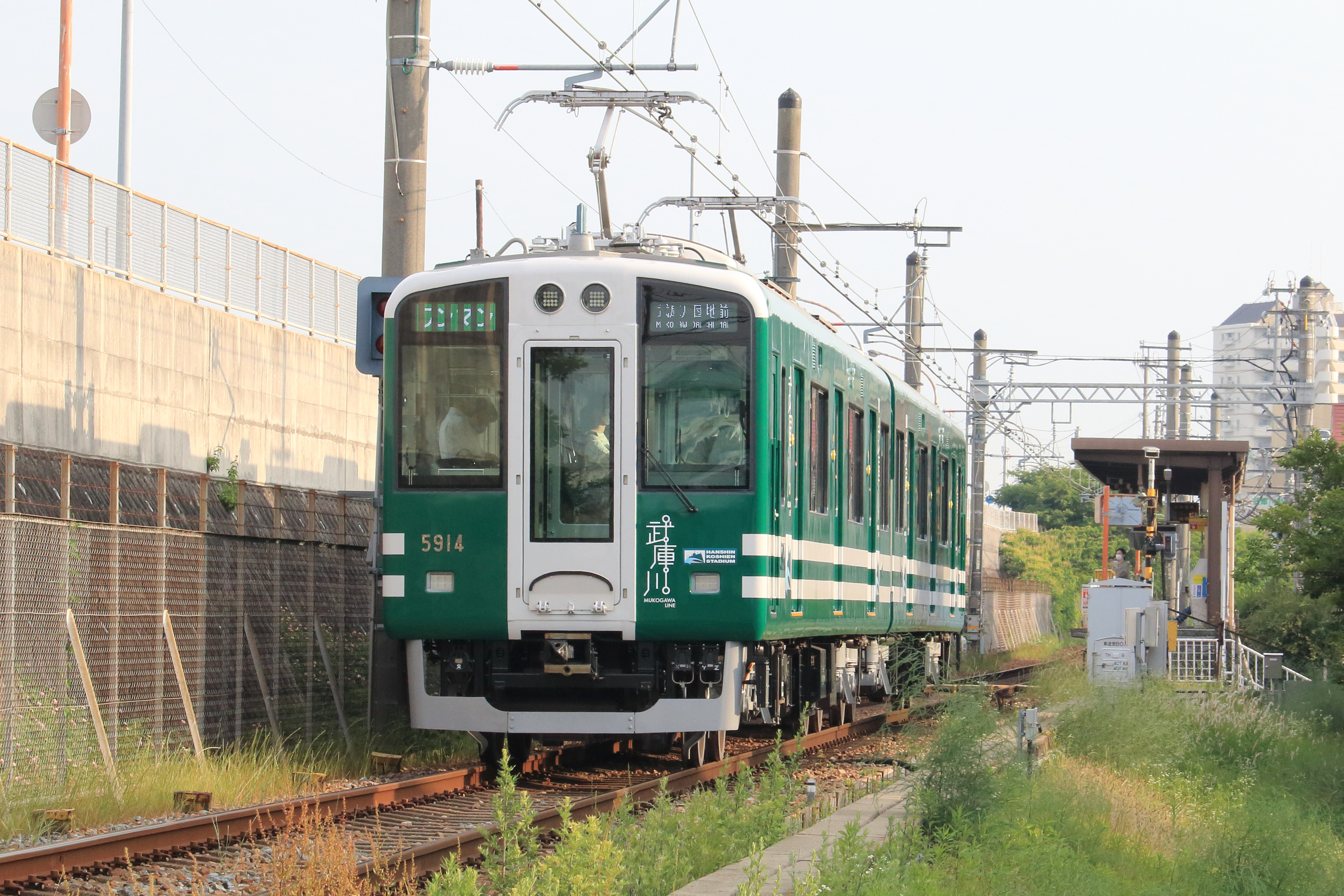
Series 5500
Koshien 5514-5914F

== Subsidiaries ==
Hanshin Electric Railway owns the Hanshin Tigers baseball team, whose home ground is Hanshin Koshien Stadium in front of Kōshien Station of the railway's Main Line.

One of the company's subsidiaries is the Osaka-based company Hanshin Contents Link, that operates the Billboard Japan brand under licence from Billboard's publisher.
