= Hanshin 9300 series =

Japanese train type

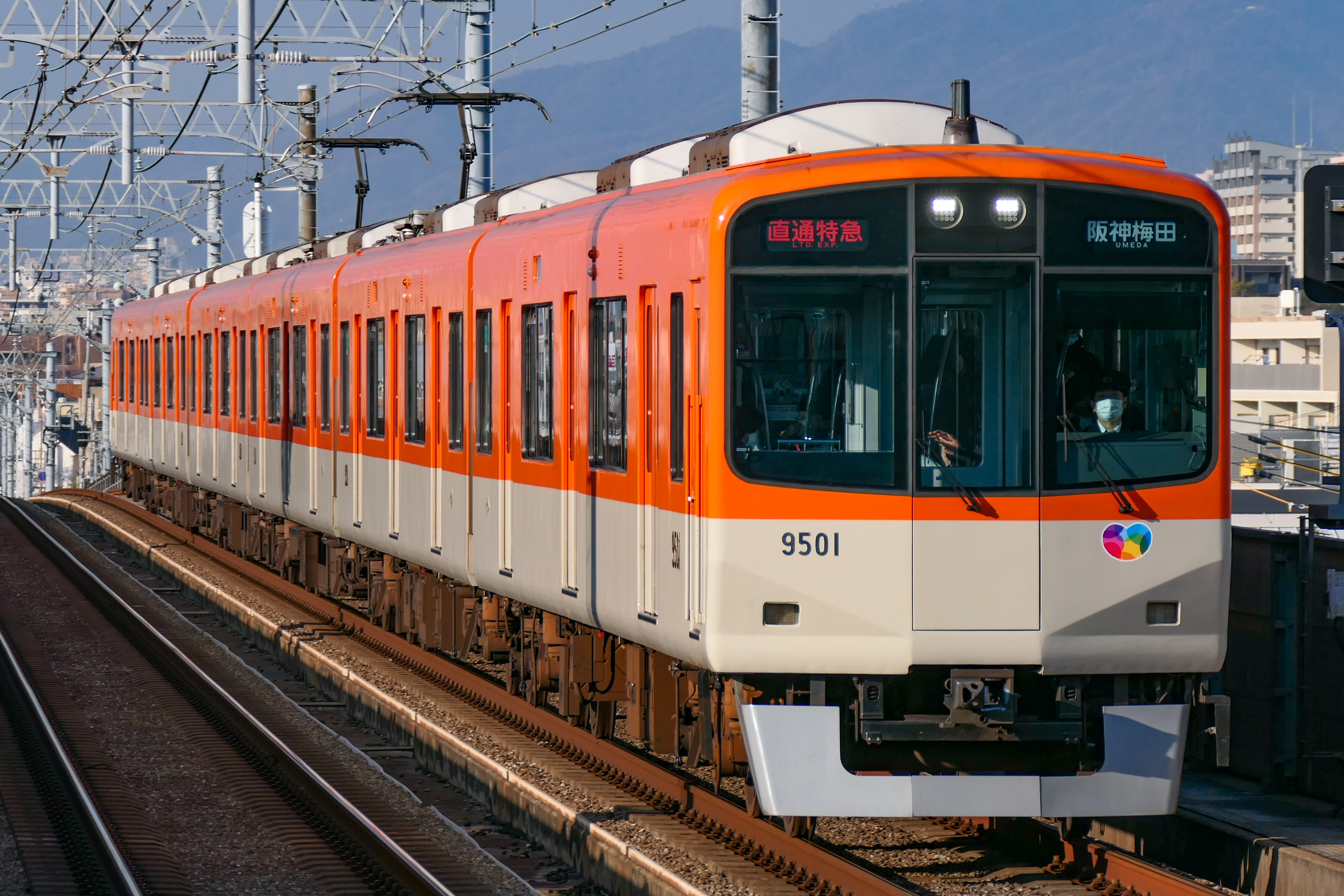
- Set 9501 on the Hanshin Main Line in December 2021
- Manufacturer: Mukogawa Sharyo
- Constructed: 2001–2002
- Entered service: 10 March 2001
- Number built: 18 vehicles (3 sets)
- Number in service: 18 vehicles (3 sets)
- Formation: 6 cars per trainset
- Operators: Hanshin Electric Railway
- Lines served: Hanshin Main Line; Hanshin Namba Line; Kobe Kosoku Line; Sanyo Electric Railway Main Line

Specifications
- Car body construction: Steel
- Car length: 18,980 mm (62 ft 3 in) (end cars); 18,880 mm (61 ft 11 in) (intermediate cars)
- Width: 2,800 mm (9 ft 2 in)
- Height: 4,160 mm (13 ft 8 in) (M cars); 4,060 mm (13 ft 4 in) (M' cars and Tc cars)
- Doors: 3 pairs per side
- Maximum speed: 110 km/h (68 mph)
- Weight: 34.5 t (34.0 long tons; 38.0 short tons) (M and M' cars); 29.5 t (29.0 long tons; 32.5 short tons) (Tc cars)
- Traction system: Toyo Denki three-phase induction motor
- Power output: 130 kW per motor
- Acceleration: 3.0 km/(h⋅s) (1.9 mph/s)
- Deceleration: 4.0 km/(h⋅s) (2.5 mph/s) (service); 4.3 km/(h⋅s) (2.7 mph/s) (emergency)
- Electric system(s): 1,500 V DC
- Current collector(s): Overhead catenary
- Braking system(s): Electronically controlled pneumatic brakes with regenerative braking
- Safety system(s): Hanshin ATS; Sanyo ATS; Hankyu ATS
- Coupling system: close-contact
- Track gauge: 1,435 mm (4 ft 8 1/2 in)

The Hanshin 9300 series (阪神電鉄9300系) is a commuter electric multiple unit (EMU) train type operated by the private railway operator Hanshin Electric Railway in Japan since 2001.

== Design ==
The design was based on the earlier 9000 series trains, formed as six-car sets. The motored cars are mounted on SS144 bogies, and the non-powered trailer cars use SS044 bogies. Upon introduction, it was the first trainset to feature perpendicular seating since the 3011 series from 1954 - the first in 47 years.

This is the last train to be built by Mukogawa Sharyo Kogyo. The manufacturer went out of business in 2002.

== Operations ==
The 9300 series sets have been operating on direct express services on the Hanshin Main Line since March 2001.

== Formations ==
As of 1 April 2017, the fleet consists of three six-car sets, numbered 9301, 9303, and 9305. Odd-numbered cars are at the Umeda end while even-numbered cars are at the Sannomiya end.

The three six-car sets are formed as shown below, with four motored "M" cars and two non-powered trailer "T" cars.

| Designation | Tc1 | M' | M | M | M' | Tc2 |
| Numbering | 9501 | 9301 | 9401 | 9402 | 9302 | 9502 |
| Weight (t) | 29.5 | 34.5 | 34.5 | 34.5 | 34.5 | 29.5 |
| Total capacity | 124 | 131 | 131 | 131 | 131 | 124 |

Each M car (the middle two cars) are fitted with one single-arm pantograph.

== Interior ==
Seating in the end cars consists of longitudinal seating throughout. In the intermediate cars, seating consists of longitudinal seating on the car ends. Between the car doors, seating is arranged in a 2+2 configuration.
