= Hanshin 9000 series =

Japanese train type

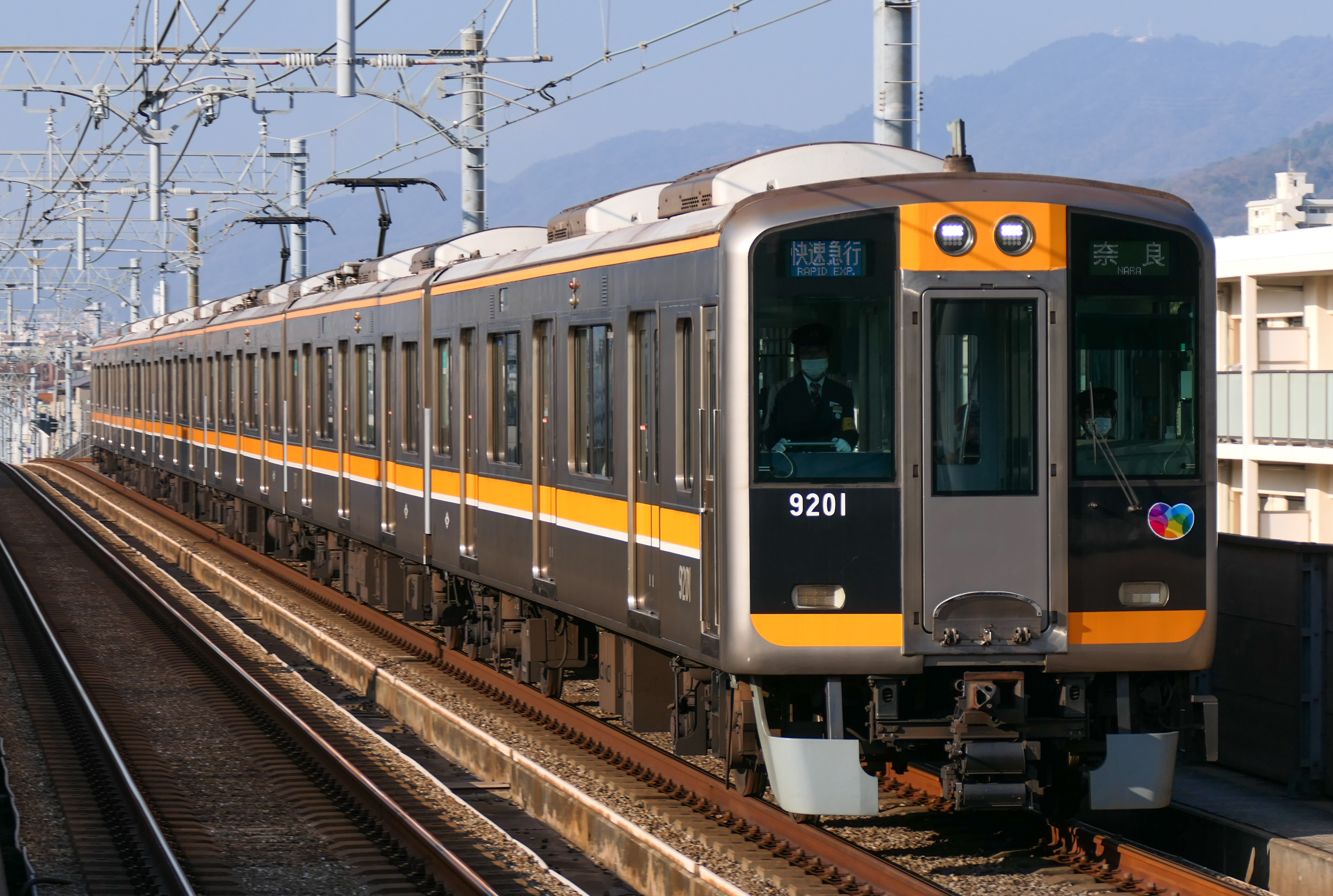
- Set 9201 on the Hanshin Main Line in December 2021
- Manufacturer: Kawasaki Heavy Industries
- Replaced: All vehicles damaged by the 1995 Great Hanshin Earthquake
- Entered service: 20 March 1996
- Number built: 30 vehicles (5 sets)
- Number in service: 30 vehicles (5 sets)
- Formation: 6 cars per trainset
- Fleet numbers: 9201–9209
- Capacity: 122 per car
- Operator: Hanshin
- Lines served: Main Line; Kobe Kosoku Line; Hanshin Namba Line; A Kintetsu Nara Line; A Kintetsu Namba Line; Sanyo Electric Railway Main Line

Specifications
- Car body construction: Stainless steel
- Car length: 18,980 mm (62 ft 3 in) (end cars); 18,880 mm (61 ft 11 in) (intermediate cars)
- Width: 2,800 mm (9 ft 2 in)
- Height: 4,060 mm (13 ft 4 in) (end cars); 4,160 mm (13 ft 8 in) (intermediate cars)
- Doors: 3 pairs per side
- Maximum speed: 110 km/h (68 mph)
- Traction system: Variable frequency (GTO)
- Power output: 110 kW per motor
- Acceleration: 3.0 km/(h⋅s) (1.9 mph/s)
- Deceleration: 4.0 km/(h⋅s) (2.5 mph/s) (service); 4.5 km/(h⋅s) (2.8 mph/s) (emergency)
- Electric system: 1,500 V DC
- Current collection: Overhead catenary
- Braking system: Electronically controlled pneumatic brakes with regenerative braking
- Safety systems: Hanshin ATS; Kintetsu ATS (old/new)
- Coupling system: Shibata-type
- Multiple working: 1000 series
- Track gauge: 1,435 mm (4 ft 8 1/2 in)

The Hanshin 9000 series (阪神電鉄9000系, Hanshin Dentetsu 9000-kei) is a commuter electric multiple unit (EMU) train type operated by the private railway operator Hanshin Electric Railway in Japan since 1996.

== Design ==
The 9000 series was designed and built by Kawasaki Heavy Industries following the January 1995 Great Hanshin earthquake, to replace vehicles damaged by the earthquake. The 9000 series uses a stainless steel design for its body work.

== Operations ==
The 9000 series are able to operate in multiple with the newer 1000 series.

== Formation ==
As of 1 April 2016, five six-car sets (numbered 9201 to 9209) are in service, formed as shown below, with car 1 at the Umeda end. Four cars are powered.

Car No.	1	2	3	4	5	6
Designation	Tc1	M1'	M	M	M'	Tc2
Numbering	92xx (odd)	90xx (odd)	91xx (odd)	91xx (even)	90xx (even)	92xx (even)
Capacity Total	122	132	132	132	132	122

Cars 3 and 4 each have one lozenge-style pantograph.

== Interior ==
Passenger accommodation consists of longitudinal bench seating throughout.

== History ==
Beginning in 2008, the 9000 series fleet underwent modification for use on Kintetsu Nara Line through services via the Hanshin Namba Line. These changes include an orange colour scheme similar to that of the 1000 series, an electrical connector (Umeda-facing end car only), modified end gangways, and full-colour external LED destination displays. Kintetsu Nara Line through services commenced on 20 March 2009, alongside the opening of the Hanshin Namba Line section between Nishikujo and Osaka Namba.

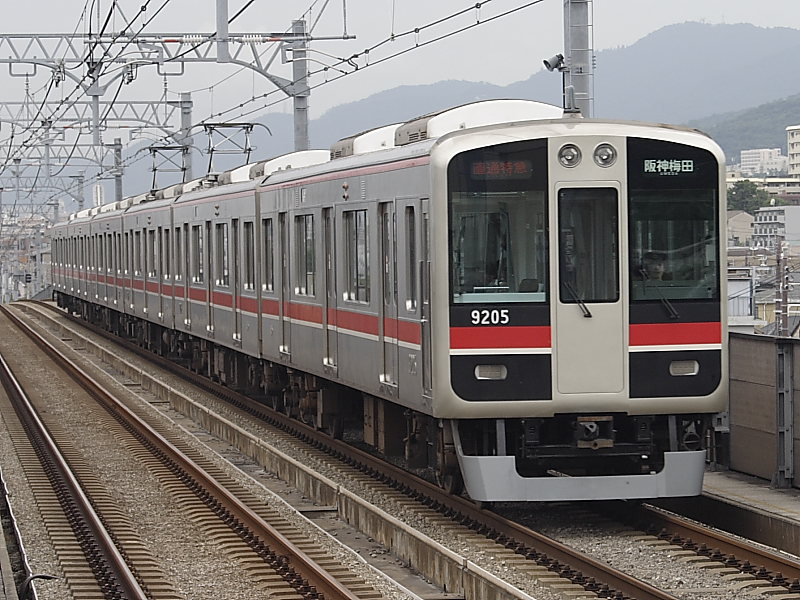
Set 9205 in original livery in July 2007
