= Imazu =

Imazu may refer to:

== People ==
- Eddie Imazu (1897–1979), Japanese art director
- Hiroshi Imazu (born 1946), Japanese politician of the Liberal Democratic Party, a member of the House of Representatives in the Diet

== Places ==
- Ōmi-Imazu Station, a railway station in Takashima, Shiga Prefecture, Japan
- Hankyū Imazu Line, a commuter rail line in Hyōgo Prefecture, Japan
- Imazu, Shiga, a town located in former Takashima District, Shiga, Japan
- Imazu Station (Ōita), a train station in Nakatsu, Ōita Prefecture, Japan
- Imazu Station (Hyōgo), a train station in Nishinomiya, Hyōgo Prefecture, Japan
