= Obayashi Station =

Railway station in Takarazuka, Hyōgo Prefecture, Japan

Obayashi Station 小林駅
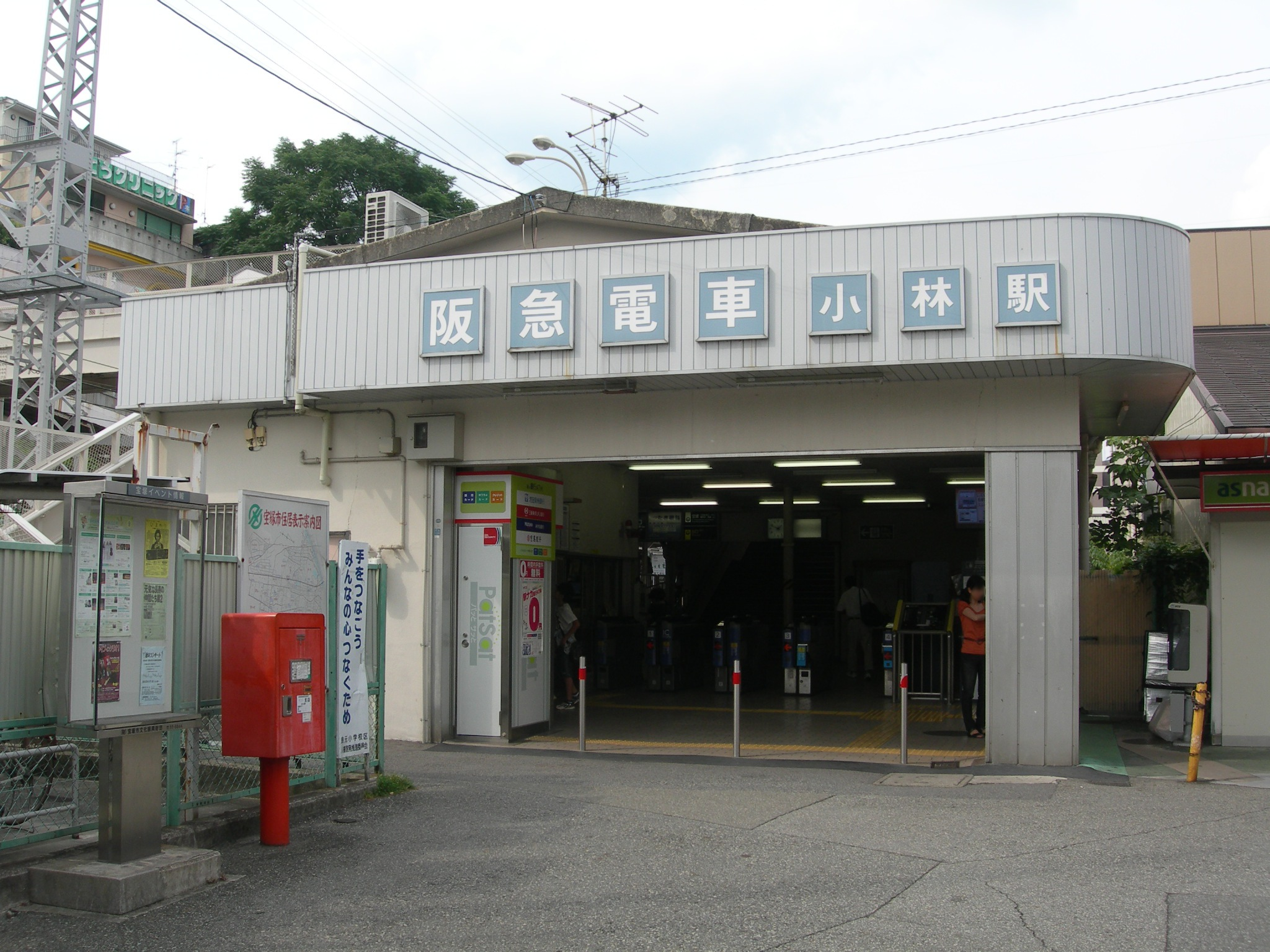
- Obayashi Station, 2012

General information
- Location: 2-chōme-1 Chigusa, Takarazuka-shi, Hyōgo-ken 665-0072; Japan
- Coordinates: 34°47′20.41″N 135°21′9.45″E
- Operator: Hankyu Railway.
- Line: ■ Hankyu Imazu Line
- Distance: 2.8 km (1.7 miles) from Takarazuka
- Platforms: 2 side platforms
- Tracks: 2

Other information
- Status: Staffed
- Station code: HK-26
- Website: Official website

History
- Opened: September 2, 1921

Passengers
- FY2019: 17,196 daily
Location
- Location within Hyōgo Prefecture Location within Japan

Obayashi Station (小林駅, Obayashi-eki; station number: HK-26) is a passenger railway station located in the city of Takarazuka Hyōgo Prefecture, Japan. It is operated by the private transportation company Hankyu Railway.

== Lines ==
Obayashi Station is served by the Hankyu Imazu Line, and is located 2.8 kilometers from the terminus of the line at Takarazuka and 20.5 kilometers from Osaka-umeda.

== Layout ==
The station consists of two opposed ground-level side platforms, connected by a footbridge. The effective length of the platform is 6 cars for Track 1 and 8 cars for Track 2.

=== Platforms ===
1	■ Imazu Line	for Takarazuka
2	■ Imazu Line	for Nishinomiya-Kitaguchi

== Adjacent stations ==
«	Service	»
Sakasegawa	Local	Nigawa
Sakasegawa	Semi-Express for Umeda	Nigawa
Sakasegawa	Arashiyama Limited Express (Extra)	Nigawa

== History ==
Obayashi Station opened on September 2, 1921.

== Passenger statistics ==
In fiscal 2019, the station was used by an average of 17,196 passengers daily

== Surrounding area ==
- Obayashi Sacred Heart School
- Takarazuka Municipal Yoshimoto Elementary School

== See also ==
- List of railway stations in Japan
