= 仁川驛 =

仁川驛 or 仁川駅 may refer to:

- Incheon Station
- Nigawa Station
