= Kokudo =

Kokudo or Kokudō may refer to:

== National Land ==
- Ministry of Land, Infrastructure, Transport and Tourism, Kokudo-kōtsū-shō, Japan
- Kokudo Keikaku, land development and leisure company under the Seibu Railway
  - Kokudo Ice-hockey, sponsored by above company 1972, then 2006–2009 as Seibu Prince Rabbits

== National Route ==
- Kokudō 1-507, National highways of Japan
- Kokudō Station (国道駅, Kokudō-eki), Yokohama
- Hanshin-Kokudō Station (阪神国道駅, Hanshin-kokudō-eki), Nishinomiya
