= Mondo-Yakujin Station =

Railway station in Nishinomiya, Hyōgo Prefecture, Japan

Mondo-Yakujin Station 門戸厄神駅
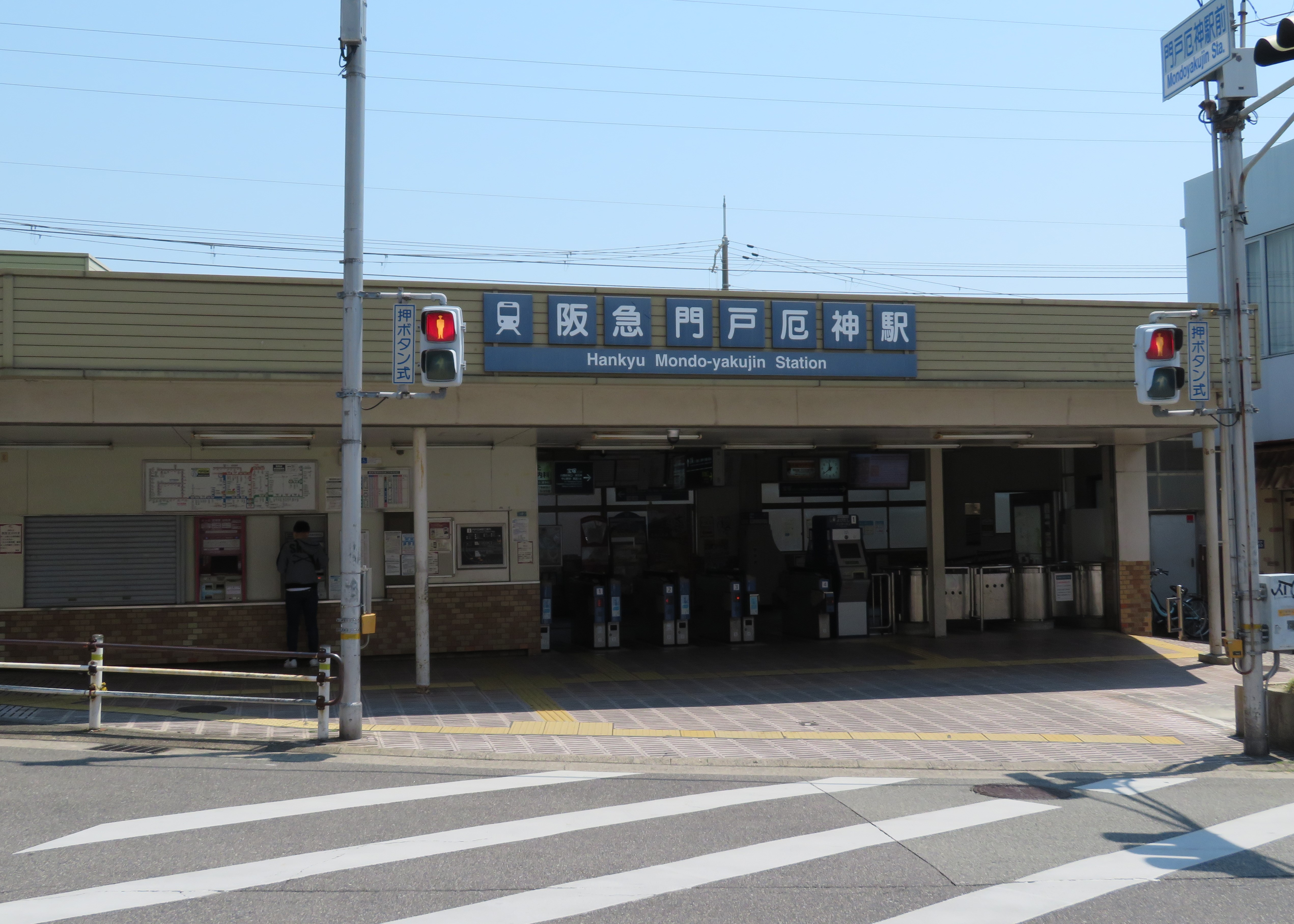
- Station building, April 2020

General information
- Location: 1-22 Higashimachi, Shimooichi, Nishinomiya-shi, Hyōgo-ken; Japan
- Coordinates: 34°45′28.48″N 135°21′29.57″E
- Operator: Hankyu Railway.
- Line: ■ Hankyu Imazu Line
- Distance: 6.4 km (4.0 miles) from Takarazuka
- Platforms: 2 side platforms
- Tracks: 2

Other information
- Status: Staffed
- Station code: HK-24
- Website: Official website

History
- Opened: September 2, 1921

Passengers
- FY2019: 20,452 daily
Location
- Location within Hyōgo Prefecture Location within Japan

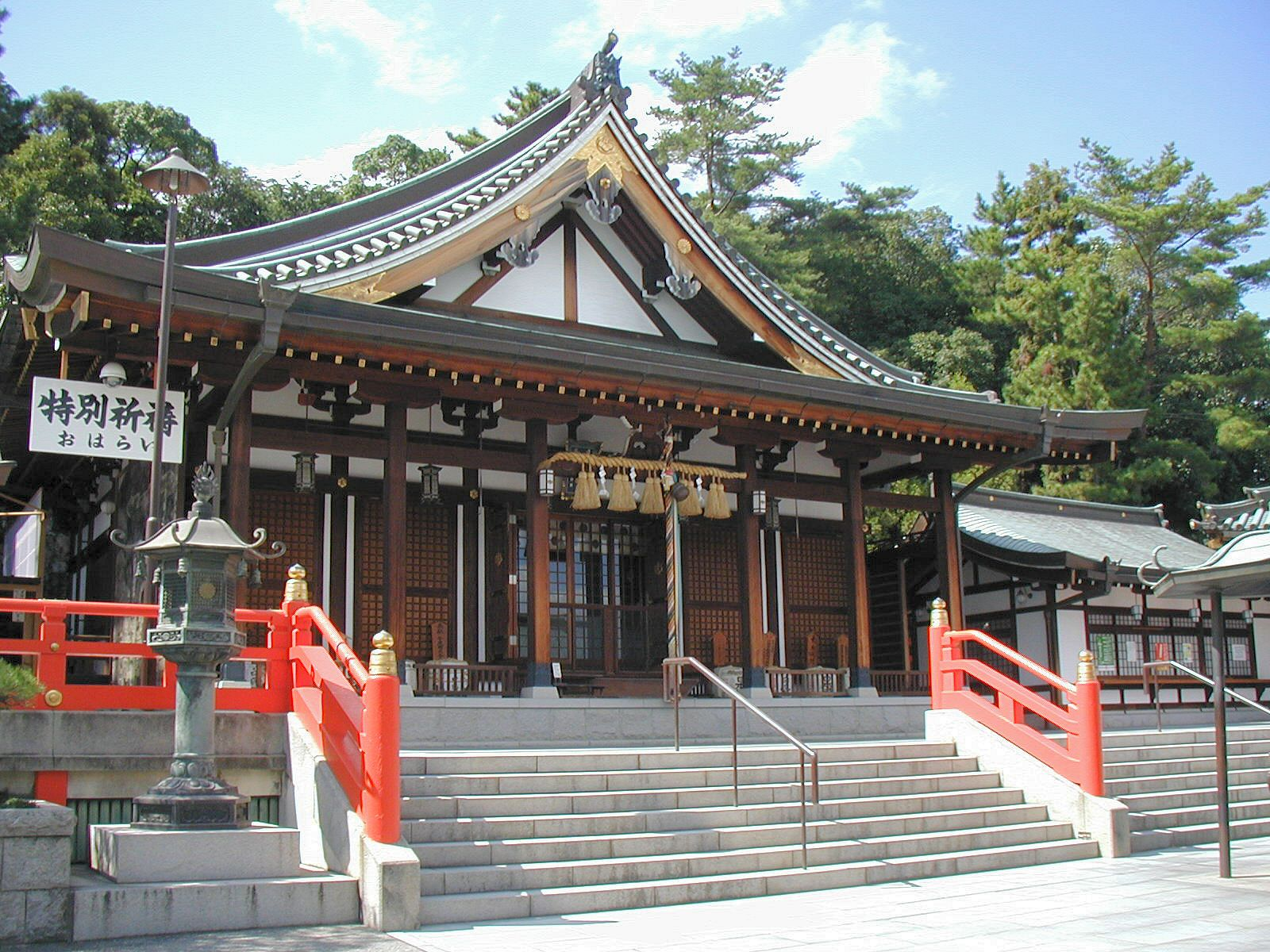
Mondo-yakujin temple

Mondo-Yakujin Station (門戸厄神駅, Mondo-yakujin-eki; station number: HK-23) is a passenger railway station located in the city of Nishinomiya Hyōgo Prefecture, Japan. It is operated by the private transportation company Hankyu Railway. It is located near Mondo-Yakujin (Tōkōji), a famous tailsman temple and the station name is after the temple. In addition, Kobe College and Seiwa College are near the station.

== Lines ==
Mondo-Yakujin Station is served by the Hankyu Imazu Line, and is located 6.4 kilometers from the terminus of the line at Takarazuka and 16.9 kilometers from Osaka-umeda.

== Layout ==
The station consists of two opposed ground-level side platforms, connected by an underground passage.

=== Platforms ===
1	■ Imazu Line	for Takarazuka
2	■ Imazu Line	for Nishinomiya-Kitaguchi

== Adjacent stations ==
«	Service	»
Hankyu Imazu Line (HK-23)
Kōtōen (HK-24)	Local	Nishinomiya-kitaguchi (HK-08)
Kōtōen (HK-24)	Semi-Express (only running for Umeda)	Tsukaguchi (Kobe Line, HK-06)
Kōtōen (HK-24)	Limited Express "Togetsu"	Tsukaguchi (Kobe Line, HK-06)
Express (only running for Umeda on the days of horse racing): Does not stop at this station

== History ==
The station opened on September 2, 1921 when the line between Nishinomiya-Kitaguchi and Takarazuka (then called the Saihō Line) started operation.

== Passenger statistics ==
In fiscal 2019, the station was used by an average of 20,452 passengers daily

== Surrounding area ==
- Nishinomiya Municipal Central Hospital
- Mondo-Yakujin Tōkō-ji
- Kobe College
- Seiwa College
- Nishinomiya Municipal Koto Elementary School

== See also ==
- List of railway stations in Japan
