= Kōtōen Station =

Railway station in Nishinomiya, Hyōgo Prefecture, Japan

Kōtōen Station 甲東園駅
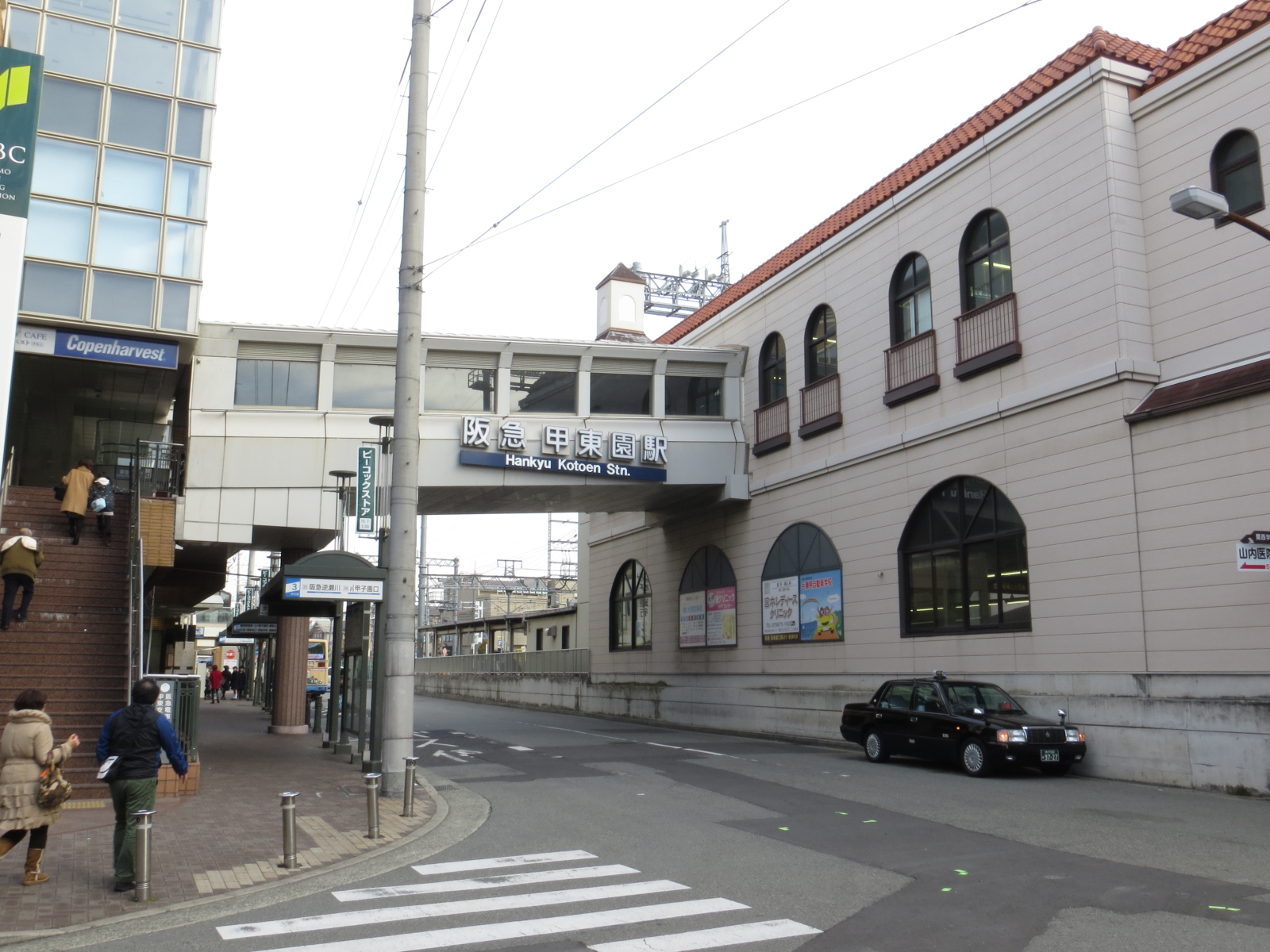
- Kōtōen Station West Exit

General information
- Location: 1-chōme-1 Kōtōen, Nishinomiya-shi, Hyōgo-ken 662-0812; Japan
- Coordinates: 34°46′1.51″N 135°21′35.25″E
- Operator: Hankyu Railway.
- Line: ■ Hankyu Imazu Line
- Distance: 5.4 km (3.4 miles) from Takarazuka
- Platforms: 2 side platforms
- Tracks: 2

Other information
- Status: Staffed
- Station code: HK-24
- Website: Official website

History
- Opened: June 1, 1922

Passengers
- FY2019: 26,007 daily
Location
- Location within Hyōgo Prefecture Location within Japan

Kōtōen Station (甲東園駅, Kōtōen-eki; station number: HK-24) is a passenger railway station located in the city of Nishinomiya Hyōgo Prefecture, Japan. It is operated by the private transportation company Hankyu Railway. It is located near Kwansei Gakuin University and highschools so many students use this station.

== Lines ==
Kōtōen Station is served by the Hankyu Imazu Line, and is located 5.4 kilometers from the terminus of the line at Takarazuka and 17.9 kilometers from Osaka-umeda.

== Layout ==
The station consists of two opposed ground-level side platforms connected by an elevated station building. The effective length of the platform is 6 cars for Track 1 and 8 cars for Track 2.

=== Platforms ===
1	■ Imazu Line	for Takarazuka
2	■ Imazu Line	for Nishinomiya-Kitaguchi

== Adjacent stations ==
«	Service	»
Hankyu Imazu Line
Nigawa	Local	Mondo-yakujin
Nigawa	Semi-Express (only running for Umeda)	Mondo-yakujin
Nigawa	Arashiyama Limited Express (Extra)	Mondo-yakujin
Express (only running for Umeda on the days of horse racing): Does not stop at this station

== History ==
Kōtōen Station opened on June 1, 1922.

== Passenger statistics ==
In fiscal 2019, the station was used by an average of 26,007 passengers daily

== Surrounding area ==
- Kwansei Gakuin University
- Kwansei Gakuin Junior High School
- Kwansei Galuin Senior High School
- Hōtoku Gakuen High School
- Nigawa Gakuin

== See also ==
- List of railway stations in Japan
