= Mukogawa Women's University Junior College Division =

- 武庫川女子大学短期大学部
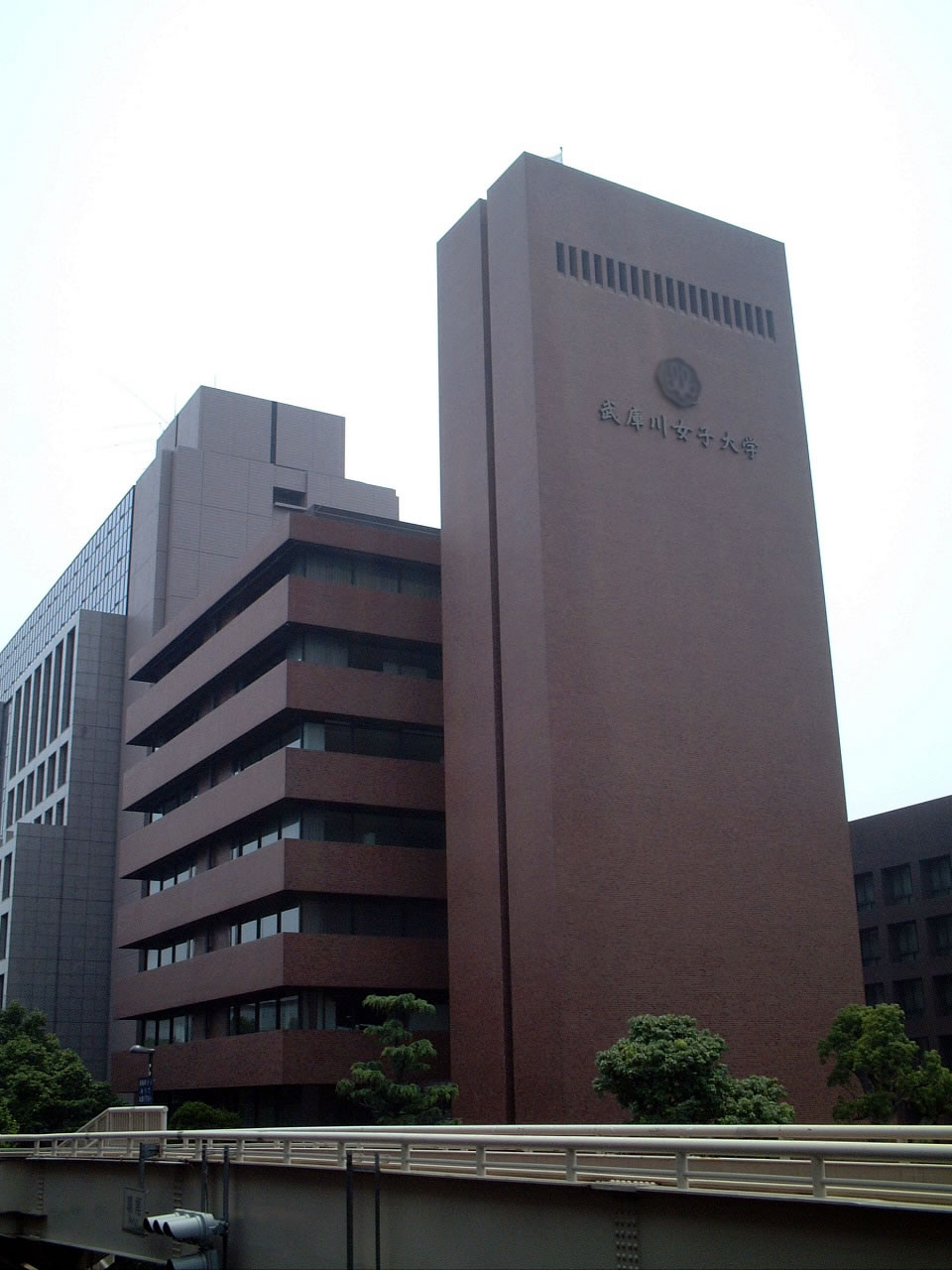
- Established: 1950
- Location: Nishinomiya, Hyōgo, Japan

Mukogawa Women's University Junior College Division (武庫川女子大学短期大学部, Mukogawa Joshi Daigaku Tanki Daigakubu) is a private junior college in Nishinomiya, Hyōgo, Japan.

== History ==
The school was founded in 1939 as a school under the name Mukogawa Gakuin (武庫川学院). It was chartered as a college in 1950. In 1985, the name of the junior college was changed to the present one. This junior college consists of seven academic departments. This number is the most for Japanese junior colleges at the present time.
