= Nigawa Station =

Railway station in Takarazuka, Hyōgo Prefecture, Japan

Nigawa Station 仁川駅
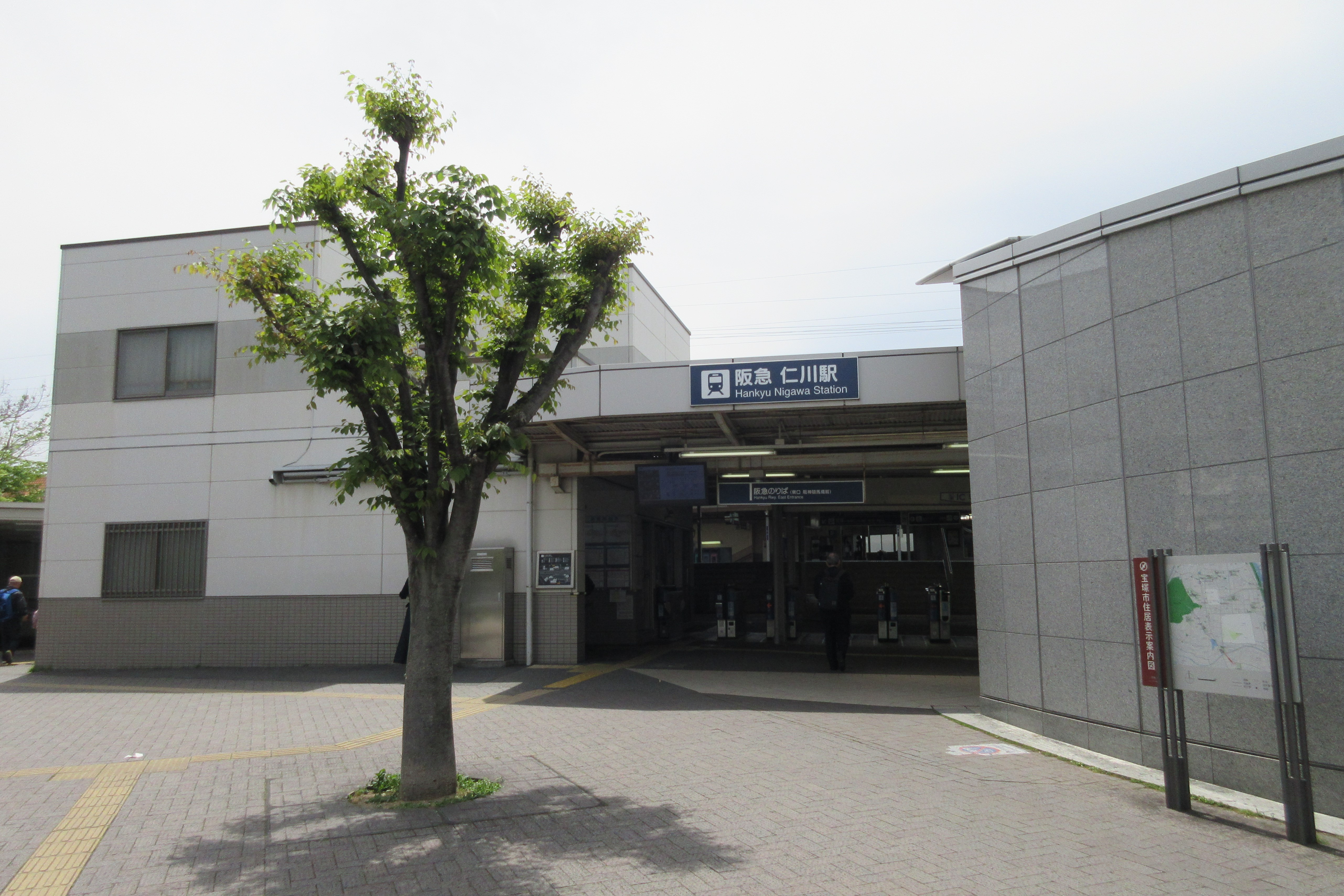
- Nigawa Station East Gate

General information
- Location: 3-chōme-3 Nigawakita, Takarazuka-shi, Hyōgo-ken 665-0061; Japan
- Coordinates: 34°46′30.86″N 135°21′25.13″E
- Operator: Hankyu Railway.
- Line: ■ Hankyu Imazu Line
- Distance: 4.5 km (2.8 miles) from Takarazuka
- Platforms: 2 side platforms
- Tracks: 2

Other information
- Status: Staffed
- Station code: HK-25
- Website: Official website

History
- Opened: December 28, 1923

Passengers
- FY2019: 24,998 daily
Location
- Location within Hyōgo Prefecture Location within Japan

Nigawa Station (仁川駅, Nigawa-eki; station number: HK-25) is a passenger railway station located in the city of Takarazuka Hyōgo Prefecture, Japan. It is operated by the private transportation company Hankyu Railway. It is located near JRA Hanshin Racecourse and Kwansei Gakuin University. It is also an entrance station to Mount Kabutoyama, the east end of the Rokkō Mountains.

== Lines ==
Nigawa Station is served by the Hankyu Imazu Line, and is located 4.5 kilometers from the terminus of the line at Takarazuka and 18.8 kilometers from Osaka-umeda.

== Layout ==
The station consists of two opposed ground-level side platforms, with an addition side platform on the inbound line in the direction of Nishinomiya Kitaguchi. Each platform is connected by underground passages in two places, north and south, connecting to two ticket gates, east and west. The main entrance is the east ticket gate, which has a window, an automatic ticket vending machine, a shop, and a toilet. Since it is also the exit for the racecourse, there are many automatic ticket gates, The additional side platform has its own temporary ticket gate,

=== Platforms ===
| 1 | ■ Imazu Line | for Takarazuka |
| 2 | ■ Imazu Line | for Nishinomiya-Kitaguchi |

== Adjacent stations ==
| « | Service | » |
Hankyu Imazu Line
| Obayashi | Local | Kōtōen |
| Obayashi | Semi-Express (only running for Umeda) | Kōtōen |
| Obayashi | Arashiyama Limited Express (Extra) | Kōtōen |
| Terminus | Express (only running for Umeda on the days of horse racing) | Tsukaguchi (Kōbe Line) |

== History ==
Nigawa Station opened on December 28, 1923. The name 'Nigawa' is originally the name of the river on the border of Takarazuka city and Nishinomiya city, and today Nigawa is used as the name of a town along the river of both cities. During the times of World War II (12/15/1943 - 9/21/1945), there was a station between Nigawa and Obayashi named Kashio (鹿塩). The station was in front of the factory of Kawanishi Aircraft Company, a predecessor of ShinMaywa Industries, Ltd. The factory was closed after GHQ ordered the company to stop manufacturing aircraft. In 1949, JRA Hanshin Racecourse was built on the vacant lot. In 2002, the station installed barrier-free facilities for the elderly and the disabled.

== Passenger statistics ==
In fiscal 2019, the station was used by an average of 24,998 passengers daily

== Surrounding area ==
- Hanshin Racecourse
- Kwansei Gakuin University
- Kwansei Gakuin Junior High School
- Kwansei Galuin Senior High School
- Nigawa Gakuin
- ShinMaywa

== See also ==
- List of railway stations in Japan
