= Imazu Station (Hyōgo) =

Railway station in Nishinomiya, Hyōgo Prefecture, Japan

Imazu Station 今津駅

General information
- Location: Nishinomiya, Hyōgo （兵庫県西宮市） Japan
- Operator: Hanshin Electric Railway Co.; Hankyu Corporation
- Connections: Bus stop
Location
- Location within Hyōgo Prefecture Location within Japan

Imazu Station (今津駅, Imazu-eki) is the name of two separate passenger railway stations located in the city of Nishinomiya, Hyōgo Prefecture, Japan. One is operated by the private transportation company Hanshin Electric Railway and web other by the private transportation company Hankyu Railway. The two stations are connected with a passage.

== Lines ==
Imazu Station is served by the Hanshin Main Line for which it is station number HS-16, and is located 15.4.0 kilometers from the terminus of the line at Umeda. It is also served by the Hankyū Imazu Line for which it is station number HK-21, and is 9.3 kilometers from the terminus of that line at Takarazuka

== Hanshin Main Line ==
Imazu Station 今津駅
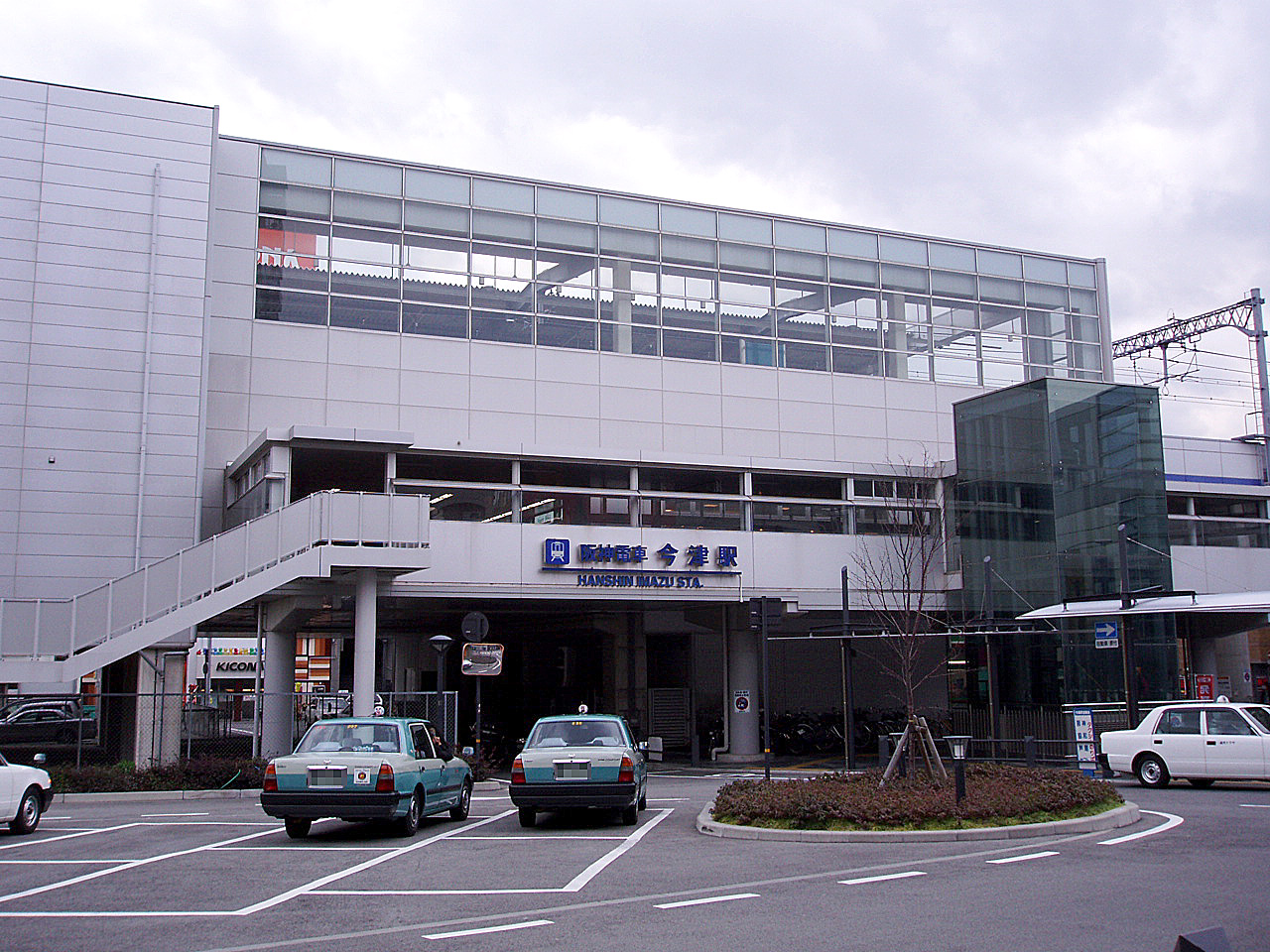
- Hanshin Imazu Station (elevated in 2001)

General information
- Location: 1-1, Imazu-Akebonocho, Nishinomiya-shi, Hyōgo-ken; Japan
- Coordinates: 34°43′51.63″N 135°21′4.91″E
- System: Hanshin Railway station
- Operator: Hanshin Electric Railway
- Line: ■ Hanshin Main Line
- Platforms: 2 side platforms
- Tracks: 2
- Connections: Hankyu Imazu Line; Bus stop

Construction
- Structure type: Elevated

Other information
- Station code: HS 16

History
- Opened: 18 December 1926

Passengers
- 2019: 33,382 (daily)

Services
Hanshin Main Line (HS 16)
Kusugawa (HS 15)	Local	Nishinomiya (HS 17)
Kōshien (HS 14)	Morning Express (Osaka-Umeda-bound trains only); Express	Nishinomiya (HS 17)
Kōshien (HS 14)	Rapid Express (except weekday mornings/evenings)	Nishinomiya (HS 17)
Kōshien (HS 14)	Morning Limited Express (Osaka-Umeda-bound trains only)	Koroen (HS 18)
Limited Express; Direct Limited Express: Does not stop at this station
Location

=== Layout ===
The station operated by Hanshin Railway was elevated in 2001. The station has two side platforms serving a track each on the 3rd level. Ticket gates and ticket machines are located on the 2nd level. The 170-m platforms are servable for the EMUs owned by Hanshin Railway and those by Kintetsu.

1	■ ■■Main Line	for Koshien, Amagasaki, Osaka (Umeda), Namba, and Nara
2	■ ■■Main Line	for Kobe (Sannomiya), Akashi, and Himeji

=== History ===
The current Imazu Station opened at this location on the Hanshin Main Line on 19 December 1926. It was also on this date that the original Imazu station to the east was renamed to Kusugawa Station.

Originally a surface-level station, the tracks once continued onto the Hanshin Main Line. This configuration was abolished after 1949 after a runaway train ran from the Imazu Line to the Hanshin Main Line at Kusugawa station.

Service was suspended owing to the Great Hanshin earthquake in January 1995. Restoration work on the Hanshin Main Line took 7 months to complete.

The station was shifted to an elevated structure on 3 March 2001.

Station numbering was introduced on 21 December 2013, with the Hanshin station being designated as station number HS-16.

In 2019, the platforms were extended to the west by about 10 meters. This was done to enable a stop for 8-car long through services to and from the Kintetsu Nara Line.

=== Gallery ===
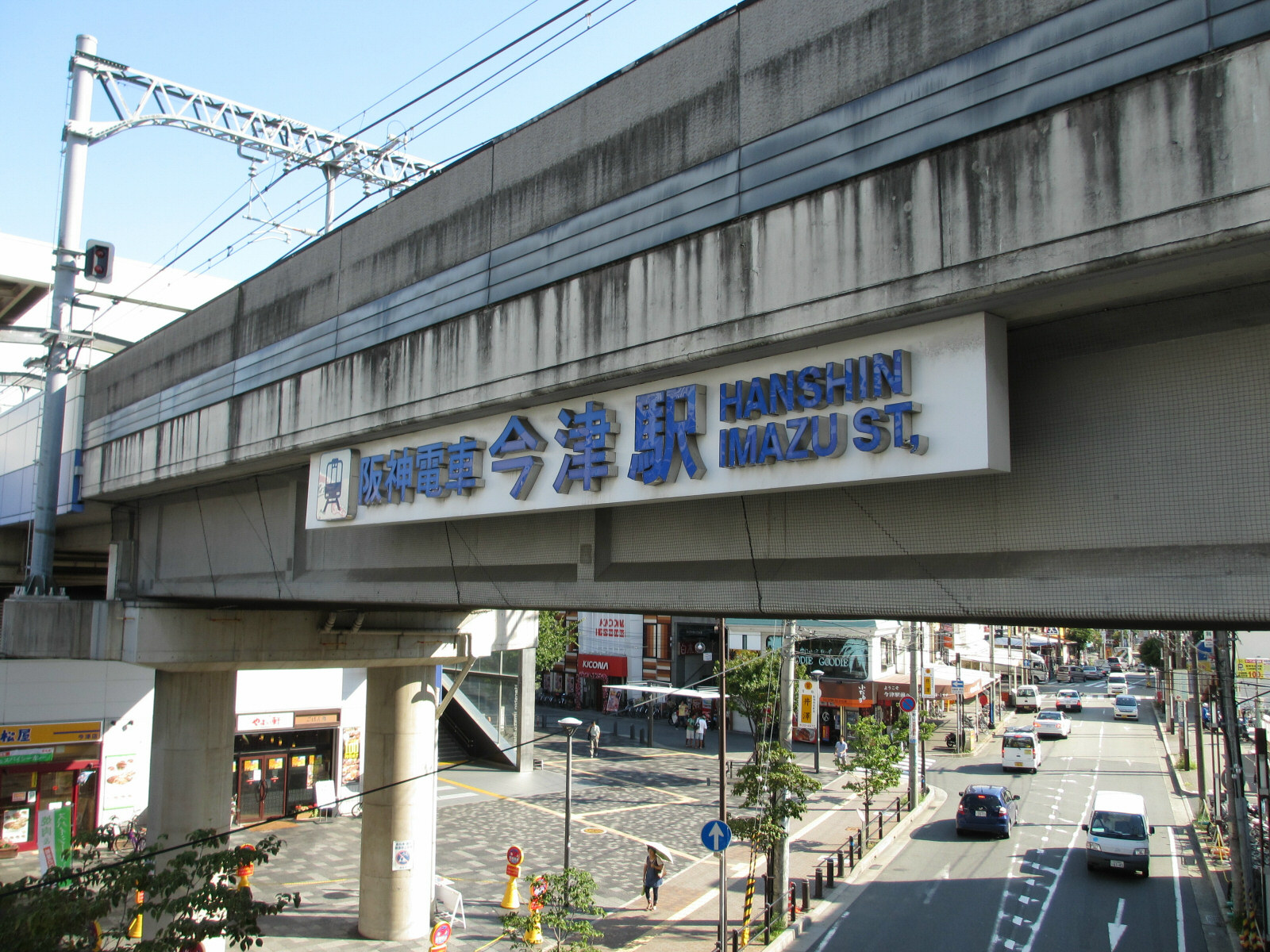
Station sign

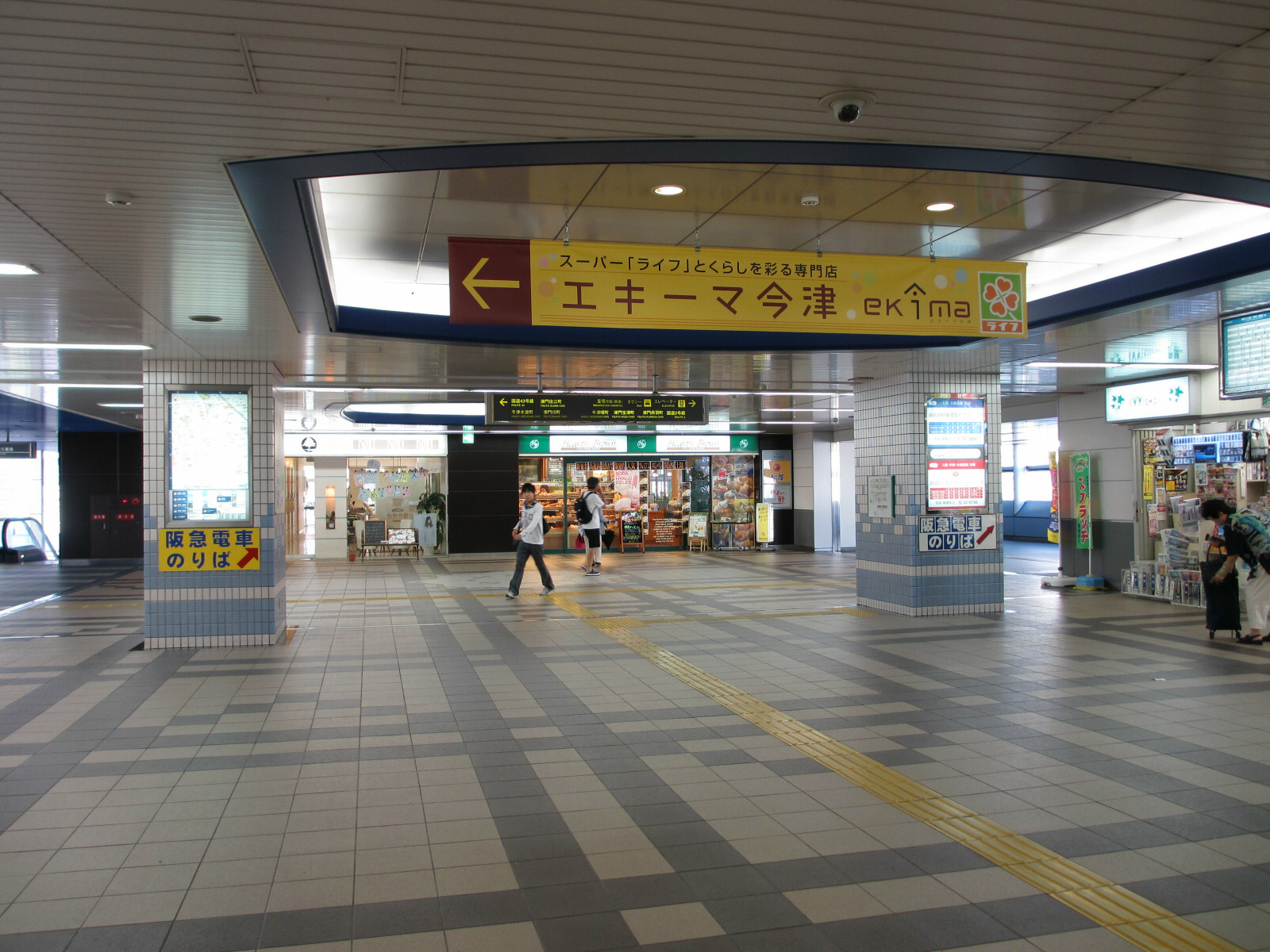
Station concourse in 2010

== Hankyu Imazu Line ==
Imazu Station 今津駅
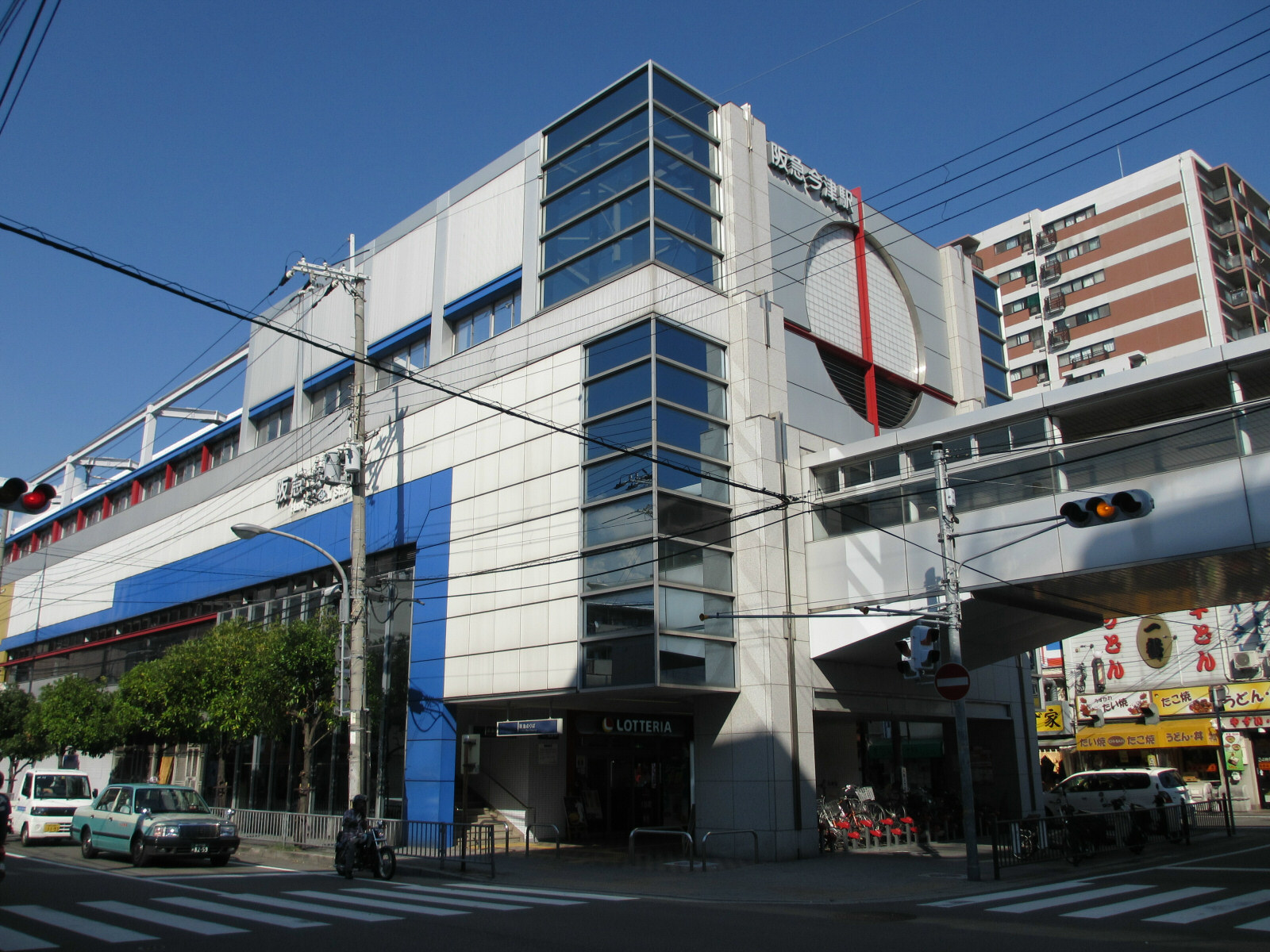
- Hankyu Imazu Station building

General information
- Location: 1-37, Tsuto-Kurehacho, Nishinomiya-shi, Hyōgo-ken; Japan
- Coordinates: 34°43′55.08″N 135°21′5.72″E
- System: Hankyu Railway station
- Operator: Hankyu Railway
- Line: Imazu Line (south)
- Platforms: 1 island platform
- Tracks: 2
- Connections: Hanshin Main Line; Bus stop

Construction
- Structure type: Elevated

Other information
- Station code: HK-21

History
- Opened: 18 December 1926

Passengers
- 2020: 18,037 (daily) (boardings only) (Note: Represents a significant ridership decrease from prior years owing to the impact of the COVID-19 pandemic on public transport.)

Services
Preceding station	Hankyu Railway	Following station
Terminus	Imazu Line South section Local	Hanshin-Kokudō HK-22 towards Nishinomiya-Kitaguchi
Location

=== Layout ===
The station is served by a single dead-end elevated island platform serving two tracks.

1	■ Imazu Line	for Nishinomiya-Kitaguchi; Change at Nishinomiya-Kitaguchi for Osaka, Kobe, Kyoto and Takarazuka
2	■ Imazu Line	for Nishinomiya-Kitaguchi (usually used); Change at Nishinomiya-Kitaguchi for Osaka, Kobe, Kyoto and Takarazuka

=== History ===
Imazu Station opened on the Hanshin Main Line on 18 December 1926.

The tracks from the Hankyu Line ran through to the Hanshin Main Line until 1949, when an air compressor failure caused a runaway train to run from the Hankyu Line to the Hanshin Main Line. The trainset, a Hankyu 600 series, continued for about 700 meters east until it hit the platforms at Kusugawa Station.

The Imazu Line was damaged by the Great Hanshin earthquake in January 1995. Restoration work on this line took a few days to complete, which the entire southern portion re-opening for service on 5 February 1995.

The current elevated platforms opened on 16 December 1995.

Station numbering was introduced on 21 December 2013, with the station being designated as station number HK-21.

=== Gallery ===
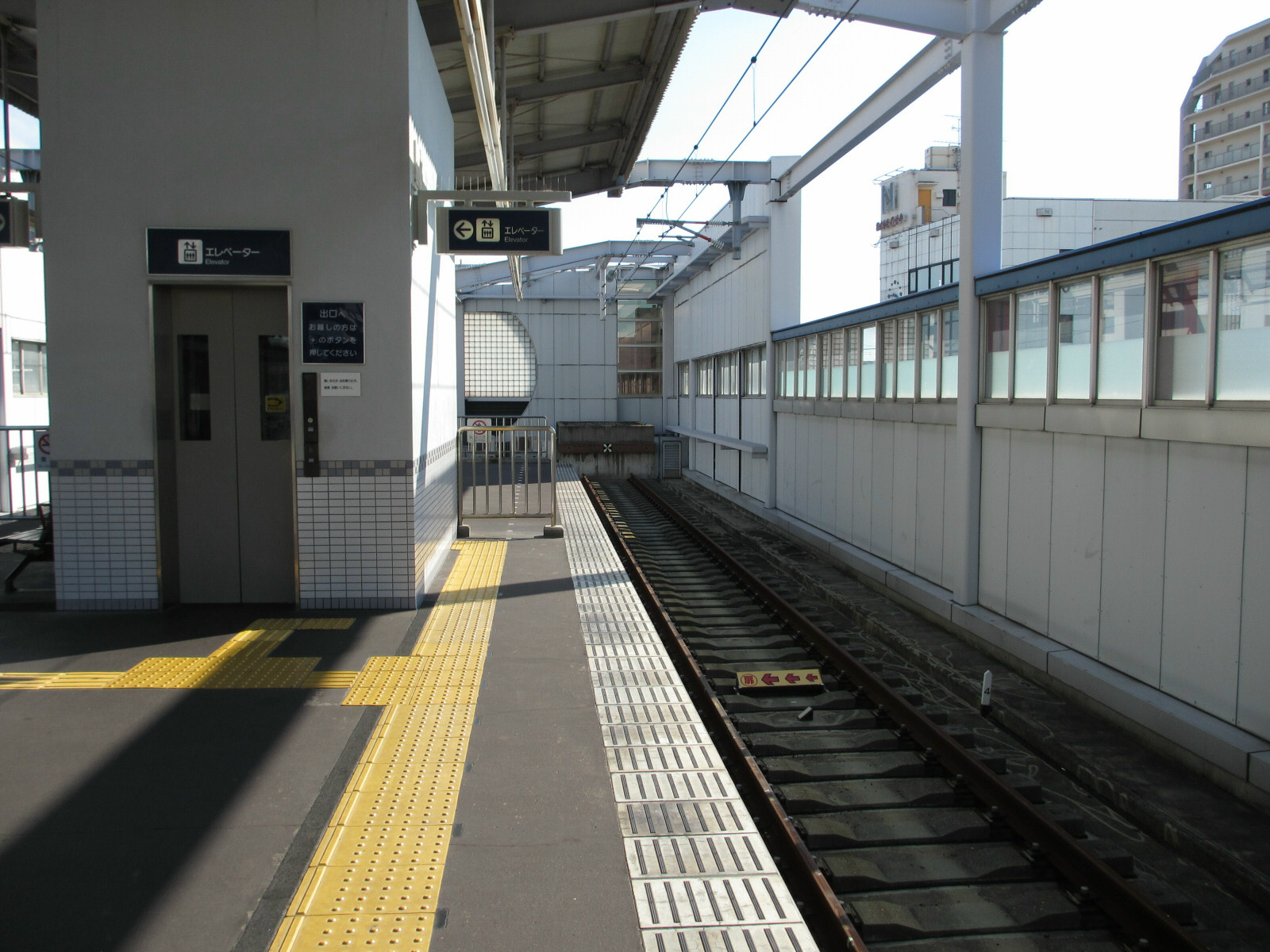
Station platforms in 2013

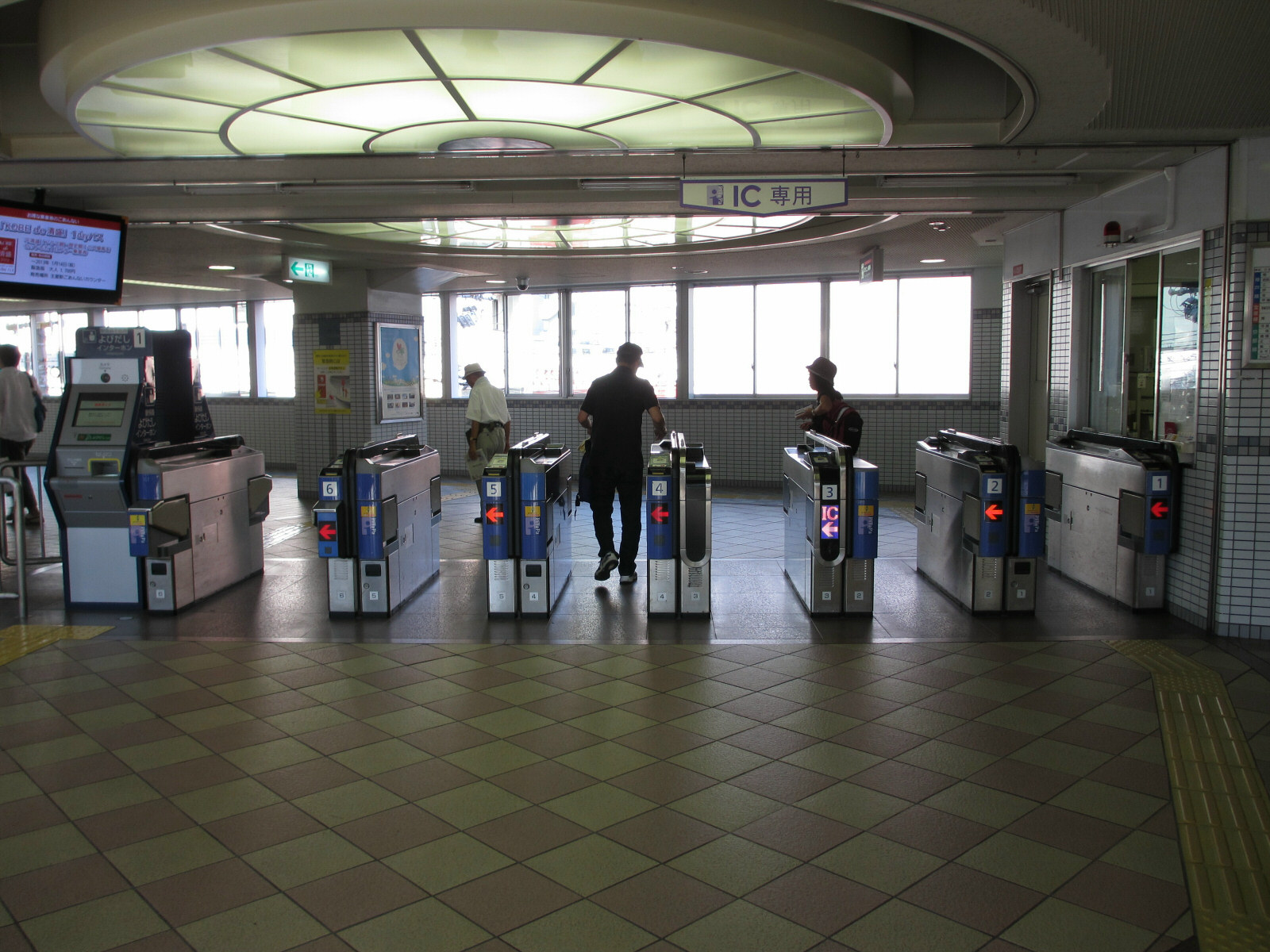
Ticketing area

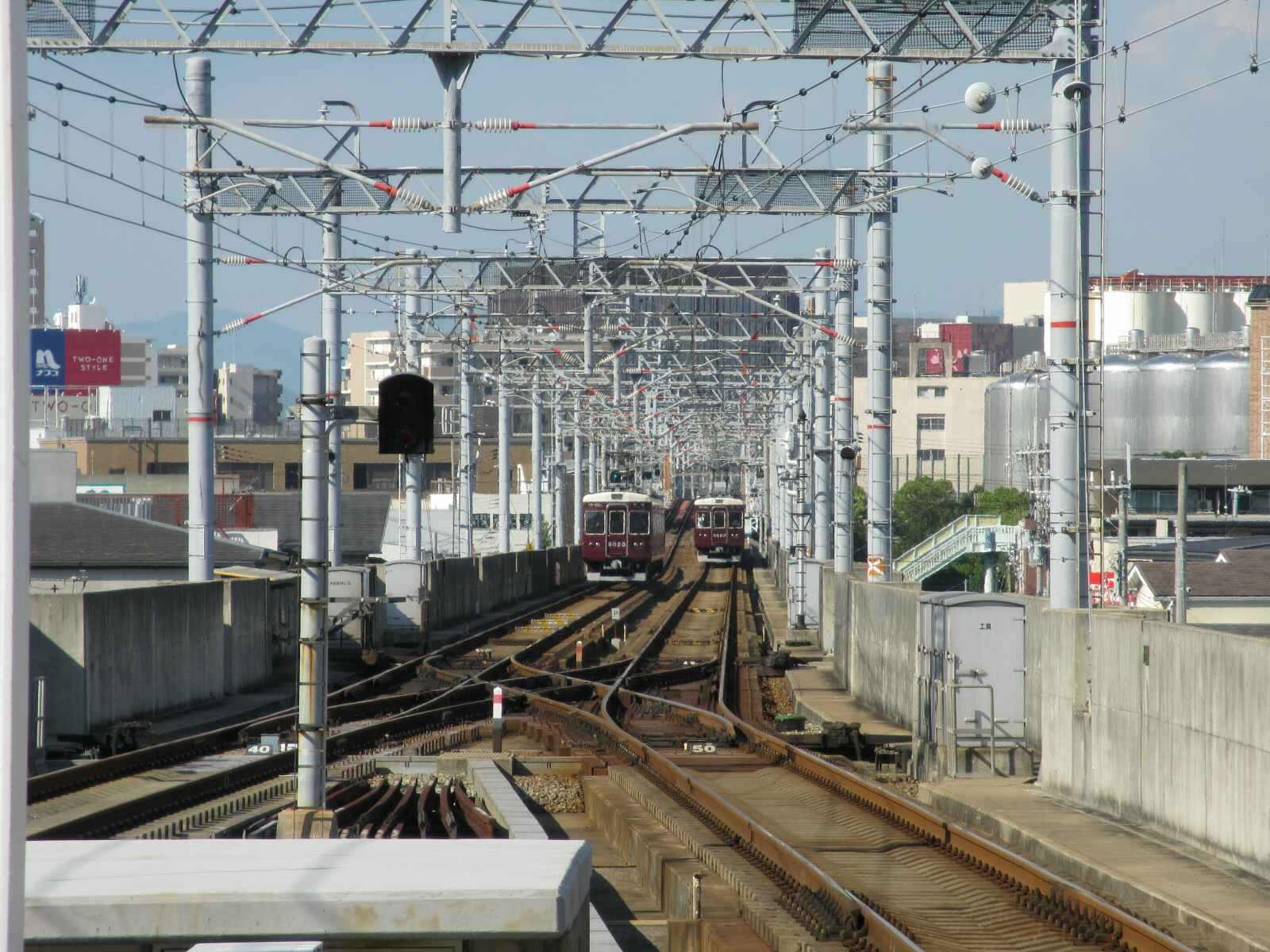
View facing north

== Surroundings ==
- Jogan-ji
- Japan National Route 43

== See also ==
- List of railway stations in Japan
