= Nishinomiya-Kitaguchi Station =

Railway station in Nishinomiya, Hyōgo Prefecture, Japan

Nishinomiya-Kitaguchi Station 西宮北口駅
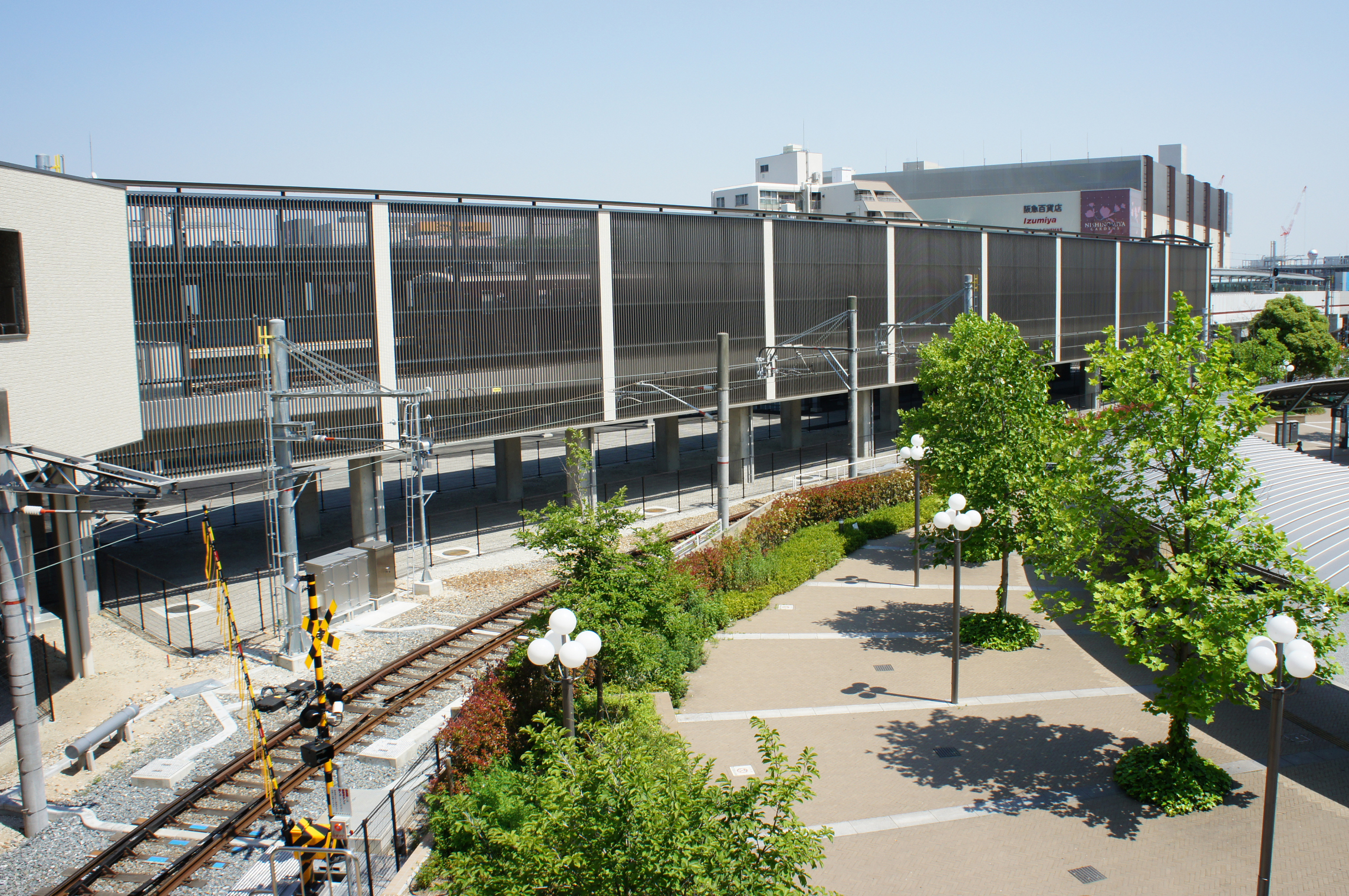
- Hankyu Nishinomiya-Kitaguchi Station track 5

General information
- Other names: Hankyu Nishinomiya Gardens (阪急西宮ガーデンズ前)
- Location: 1-chōme-2 Kōfūen, Nishinomiya-shi, Hyōgo-ken 662-0832; Japan
- Coordinates: 34°44′45.32″N 135°21′23.99″E
- Operator: Hankyu Railway
- Line: ■ Hankyu Kobe Main Line ■ Hankyu Imazu Line
- Platforms: 2 island + 3 side + 3 bay platforms

Other information
- Station code: HK-08
- Website: Official website

History
- Opened: 16 July 1920

Passengers
- FY2019: 57,674

Services
Hankyu Railway Kōbe Main Line (HK 08)
Mukonosō (HK 07)	Local	Shukugawa (HK 09)
Tsukaguchi (HK-06)	Express	Shukugawa (HK 09)
Mukonosō (HK 07)	Commutation Express (on weekdays)	Shukugawa (HK 09)
Jūsō (HK 03)	Limited Express	Shukugawa (HK 09)
Tsukaguchi (HK-06)	Commutation Limited Express; Semi limited Express; Limited Express "Atago" (operated during crowded season)	Shukugawa (HK 09)
Semi-Express from the Imazu Line for Umeda: Does not stop at this station
Express from the Imazu Line for Umeda (on the days of horse racing): Does not stop at this station
Limited Express "Togetsu" (operated during crowded season): Does not stop at this station
Hankyu Railway Imazu Line (north) (HK 08)
Mondo-Yakujin (HK 23)	Local	Terminus
Semi-Express to the Kōbe Line for Umeda: Does not stop at this station
Express to the Kōbe Line for Umeda (on the days of horse racing): Does not stop at this station
Limited Express "Togetsu" (operated during crowded season): Does not stop at this station
Hankyu Railway Imazu Line (south) (HK 08)
Terminus	-	Hanshin Kokudō (HK 22)
Location
- Location within Hyōgo Prefecture Location within Japan

Nishinomiya-Kitaguchi Station (西宮北口駅, Nishinomiya-kitaguchi-eki; station number: HK-08) is a junction passenger railway station located in the city of Nishinomiya, Hyōgo Prefecture, Japan. It is operated by the private transportation company Hankyu Railway. It is one of the main stations in Nishinomiya City, with Hanshin Nishinomiya Station and JR Nishinomiya Station.

== Lines ==
Nishinomiya-Kitaguchi Station is served by the Hankyu Imazu Line, and is located 7.7 kilometres (4.8 miles) from the terminus of the line at Takarazuka and is also served by the Hankyu Kobe Line, for which it is 15.6 kilometres (9.7 miles) from the terminus of that line at Osaka-umeda. The platforms of Hankyu Imazu Line to Takarazuka Station, northbound, and Imazu Station, southbound are separated, and so there are no through trains from Takarazuka to Imazu.

== Layout ==
Current track map of Hankyu Railway Nishinomiya-kitaguchi station

- Kobe Line: 2 island platforms and 2 side platforms serving 2 tracks each.

	■ Exit	from trains at Line 1
1, 2	■ Kōbe Line	for Shukugawa, Kōbe (Kobe-sannomiya, Rokko, Shinkaichi) and the Sanyo Railway Main Line
3, 4	■ Kōbe Line	for Ōsaka (Umeda), Itami, Kyōto and Kita-Senri
	■ Exit	from trains at Line 4

- Imazu Line (south): an elevated side platform serving a track.

5	■ Imazu Line (south)	for Imazu

- Imazu Line (north): 3 bay platforms serving 2 tracks.

	■ Exit	from trains at Line 6
6	■ Imazu Line (north)	for Nigawa, Takarazuka, Kawanishi-noseguchi and Minoo (during the rush hour)
7	■ Imazu Line (north)	for Nigawa, Takarazuka, Kawanishi-noseguchi and Minoo
	■ Exit	from trains at Line 7

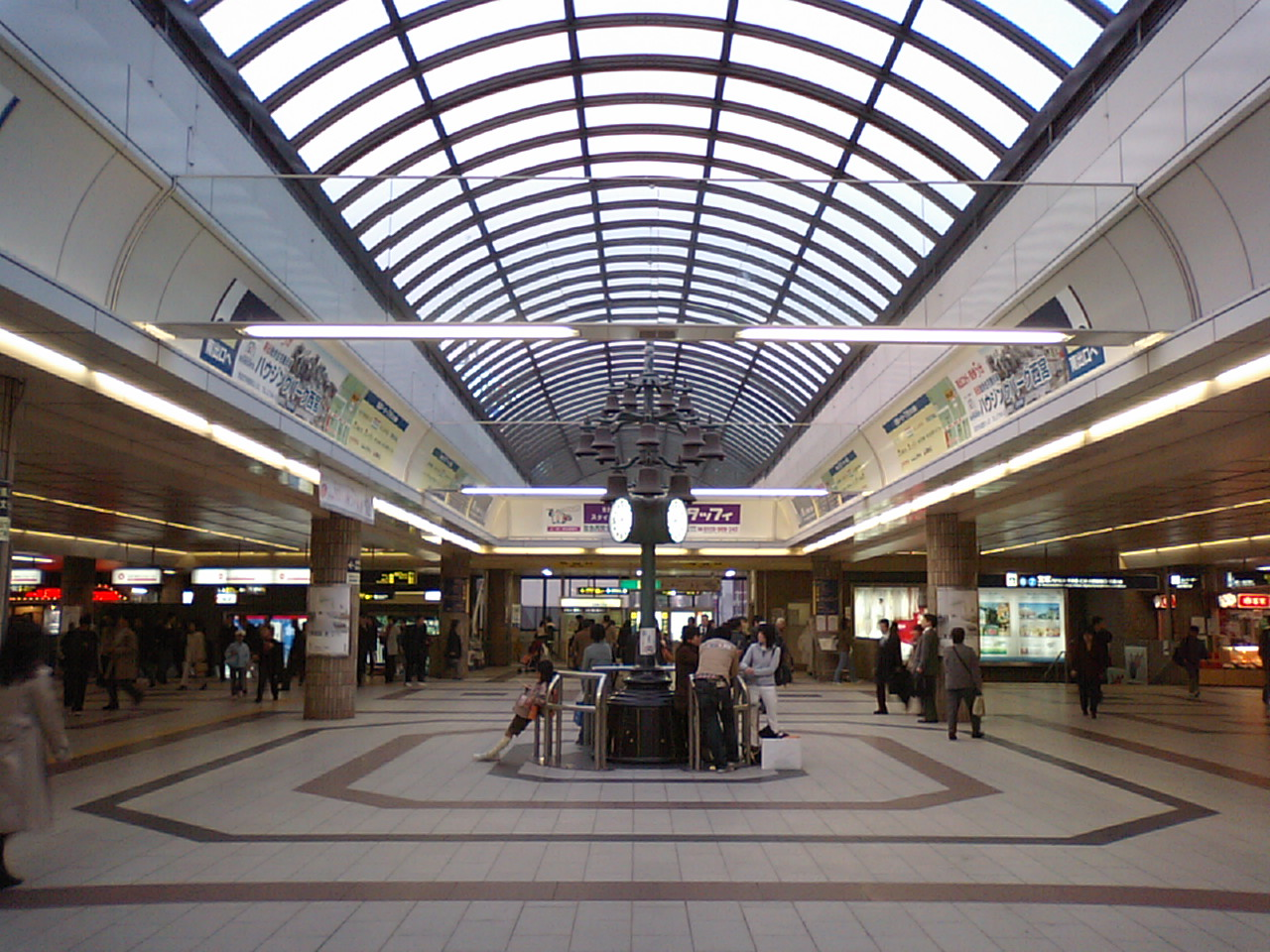
Concourse of Nishinomiya-Kitaguchi Station

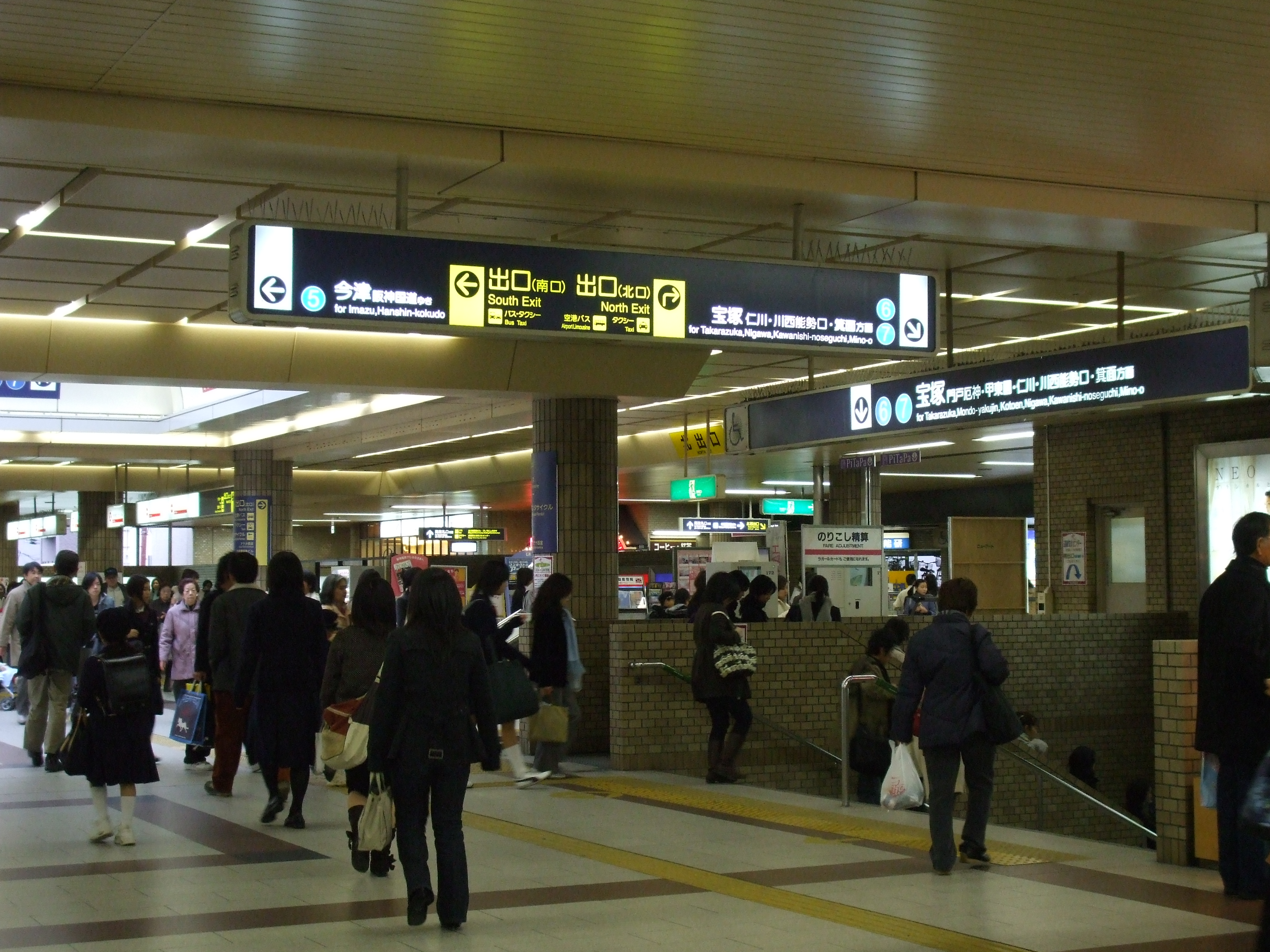
Concourse of Nishinomiya-Kitaguchi Station

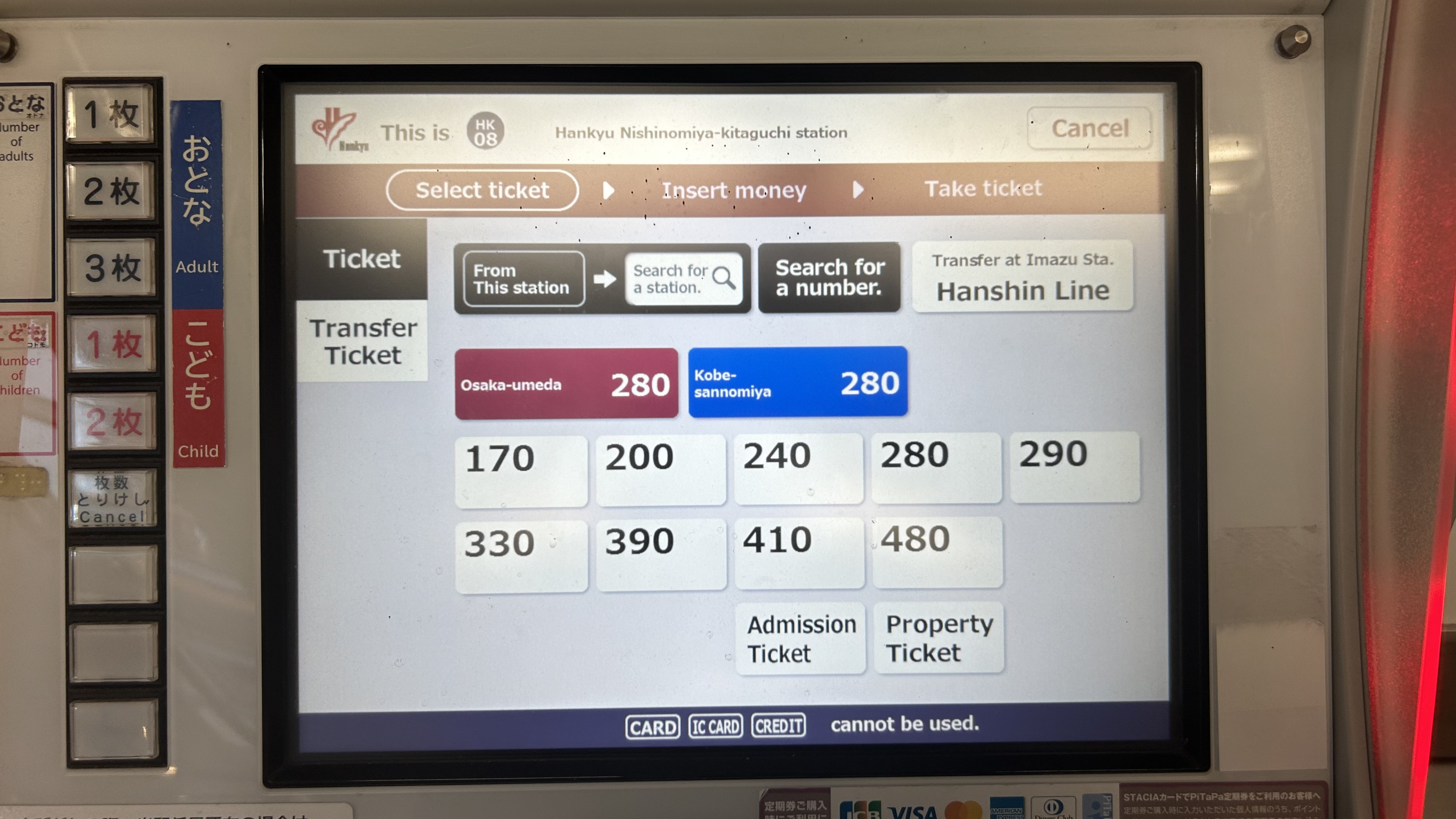
Ticket machine screen

== History ==
Nishinomiya-Kitaguchi Station opened on 16 July 1920 when the Kobe Main Line opened. The Imazu Line opened the next year.

Nishinomiya-Kitaguchi Station was damaged by the Great Hanshin earthquake in January 1995. Restoration work on the Kobe Line took 7 months to complete.

Station numbering was introduced on 21 December 2013, with Nishinomiya-Kitaguchi being designated as station number HK-08.

=== Past layout ===
Track map of Hankyu Railway Nishinomiya-kitaguchi station before 1984

There were four 90-degree diamond crossings served by the Kobe Line and the Imazu Line until they were removed in 1984 to build the new station building. The crossings were located in the south of the platforms for the Imazu Line, between the westbound platforms and the eastbound platforms for the Kobe Line.

- Kobe Line westbound platforms: on the east side of the Imazu Line, an island platform serving 2 tracks with a side platform for arrivals in the south.

	■ Exit	from trains at Line 1
1, 2	■ Kōbe Line	for Kōbe (Kobe-sannomiya, Rokko, Shinkaichi) and the Sanyo Railway Main Line

- Kobe Line eastbound platforms: on the west side of the Imazu Line, an island platform serving 2 tracks with a side platform for arrivals in the north.

3, 4	■ Kōbe Line	for Ōsaka (Umeda), Itami, Kyoto and Kita-Senri
	■ Exit	from trains at Line 4

- Imazu Line: on the north side of the Kobe Line, a side platform and a dead-end platform serving 4 tracks, one of which tracks was removed in 1977.

5	■ Imazu Line	for Imazu
6, 7	■ Imazu Line	for Nigawa, Takarazuka, Kawanishi-noseguchi and Minoo
8	■ Imazu Line	for Takarazuka (Used during the rush hour until 1977)

== Passenger statistics ==
In fiscal 2019, the station was used by an average of 57,674 passengers daily

=== Buses ===
South Terminal
Hankyu Bus Co.
Bus stop 1	Route 1 for Kabutoyama Cemetery (via JR Nishinomiya, Nishinomiya City Hall, JR Sakura Shukugawa, Hankyu Shukugawa and Nishinomiya-Kabutoyama High School); Route 7 for Hankyu Shukugawa (via JR Nishinomiya, Egamicho and JR Sakura Shukugawa) only one service on Saturdays; Route 26 for Hanshin Nishinomiya (via JR Nishinomiya and Nishinomiya City Hall); Route 50 for Nishinomiya Central Hospital (via Koshien Junior College, Kumanocho, JR Koshienguchi, Kumanocho, Kawaragi Junior High School and Hinoguchi Elementary School); Route 96 for Hankyu Ishibashi and Ishibashi-kitaguchi (via Nishinomiya Central Hospital, Koyanosato, Itami City Hall and Kitamura); Route 97 for Toyonaka (via Nishinomiya Central Hospital, Koyanosato, Itami City Hall, Kitamura and Hotarugaike); Route 100 for Hanshin Koshien (via Takahatacho and Kokudo Kamikoshien); Sakura Yamanami Bus for Yamaguchi area and Arima Onsen (via JR Nishinomiya, JR Sakura Shukugawa and Hankyu Shukugawa)
Bus stop 2	Route 11 for Kwansei-Gakuin and Kotoen (via JR Nishinomiya, Nakamura and Uegahara-rokubancho); Route 12 for Kwansei-Gakuin and Kotoen (via Notocho and Uegahara-rokubancho); Route 16 for Kwansei-Gakuin and Kotoen (via Notocho and Atagoyama); Route 19 for Kwansei-Gakuin and Kotoen (via JR Nishinomiya, Nakamura and Atagoyama)
Bus stop 3	Route 22, 23 for Asanagicho (via Ryodocho, JR Nishinomiya and Nishinomiya City Hall (Hanshin Nishinomiya Station East Entrance)); Route 24 for Asanagicho (via Hankyu Bus Nishinomiya Office, JR Nishinomiya and Nishinomiya City Hall (Hanshin Nishinomiya Station East Entrance))
Hanshin Bus Co.
Bus stop 1	for Hanshin Nishinomiya (via JR Nishinomiya and Nishinomiya City Hall); for Hanshin Koshien (via Takahatacho and Kokudo Kamikoshien); for Nishinomiyahama (via JR Nishinomiya, Nishinomiya City Hall and Hanshin Nishinomiya)
North Terminal
airport limousine
for Kansai International Airport	operated by Hankyu Bus Co., Hanshin Bus Co., Osaka Airport Transport Co., Kansai Airport Transportation Enterprise Co. and Nankai Bus Co.
for Osaka International Airport	operated by Hanshin Bus Co. and Osaka Airport Transport Co.

== Surrounding area ==
- Hankyu Railway Nishinomiya Garage
- Hankyu Nishinomiya Gardens (formerly Hankyu Nishinomiya Stadium)
- Hyogo Performing Arts Center
- ACTA Nishinomiya
- Koshien Gakuin
- Koshien Junior College

== See also ==
- List of railway stations in Japan
- Orix Buffaloes - The Hankyu Braves, predecessors of the Orix Buffaloes, were based at Nishinomiya Stadium and Nishinomiya-Kitaguchi Station was the nearest station. In those days, train conductors called the station name as "Nishinomiya-kitaguchi, Nishinomiya Stadium-mae". Now there is Hankyu Nishinomiya Gardens opened on November 26, 2008 on the vacant lot where the stadium used to be, and the station name is announced "Nishinomiya-kitaguchi, Hankyu Nishinomiya Gardens-mae".
- The Melancholy of Haruhi Suzumiya - "Kitaguchi station" in this anime was modeled on this station.
