= Seiwa College =

Higher education institution in Hyōgo Prefecture, Japan

Coordinates: 34°45′42″N 135°21′06″E

Seiwa College (聖和大学, Seiwa daigaku) was a private university in Nishinomiya, Hyōgo, Japan which was consolidated into Kwansei Gakuin University (関西学院大学, Kansei Gakuin Daigaku) in 2009.

The predecessor of the school was founded in 1880 as a Congregational Women's Seminary in Kōbe by two missionaries from the US, Julia Elizabeth Dudley and Martha J. Burrows. It was in 1941 when by Holy Union three institutions including Methodist Lambuth Memorial Women's Seminary (ランバス記念伝道女学校, Lambuth Kinen Dendo Jogakō) (founded 1888) and Nursing Course of Hiroshima Women's School (l広島女学校, Hiroshima Jogakō) (founded 1895) became Seiwa Women's School (聖和女子学院, Seiwa Joshi Gakuin). Chartered as a university in 1950, and became a four-year college in 1964. The school closed in 2013.
