= Hanshin-Kokudō Station =

Railway station in Nishinomiya, Hyōgo Prefecture, Japan

Hanshin-Kokudō Station 阪神国道駅
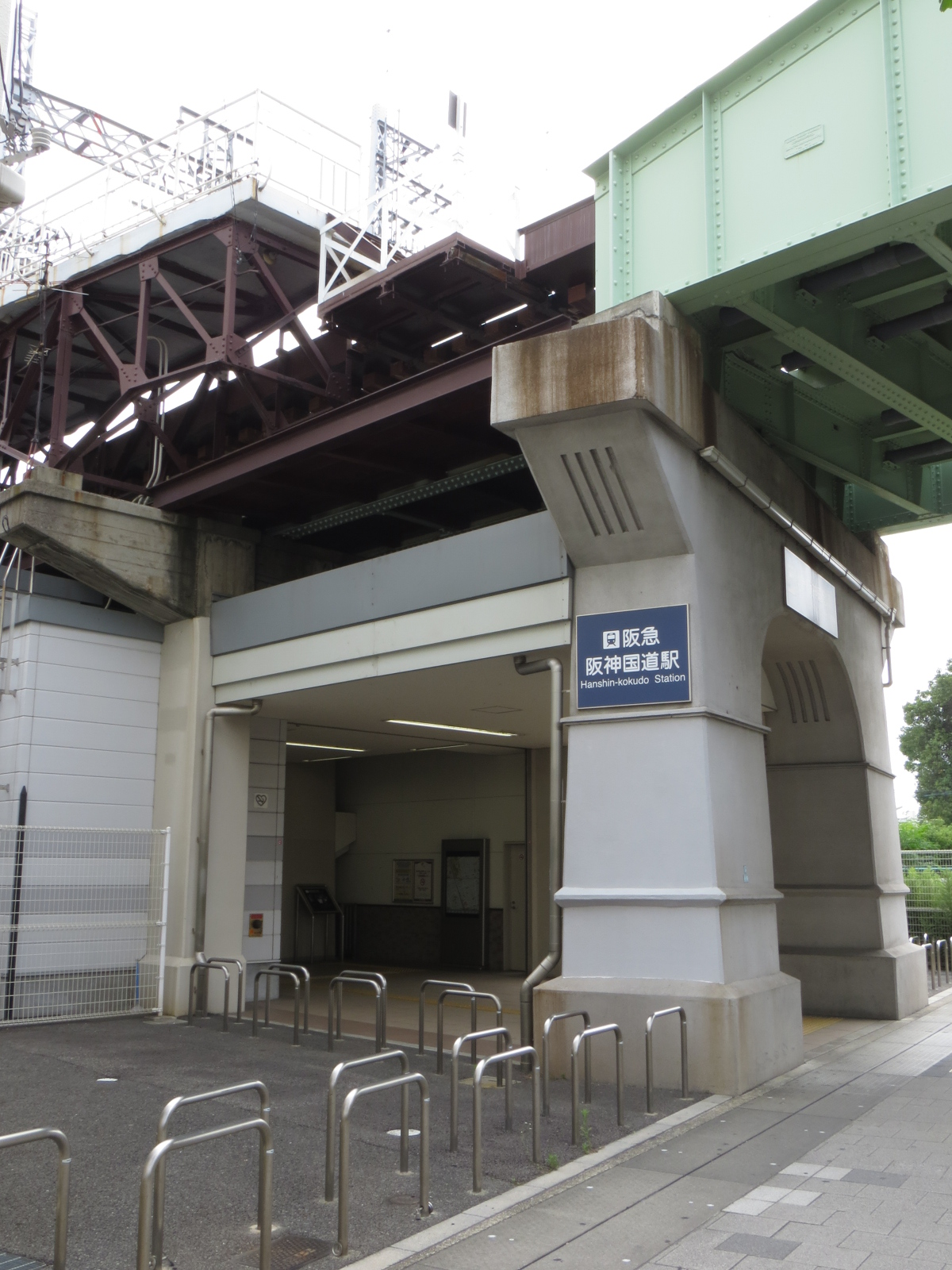
- Hanshin-Kokudō Station entrance, July 2014

General information
- Location: 10 Tsutoōtsukachō, Nishinomiya-shi, Hyōgo-ken 663-8241; Japan
- Coordinates: 34°44′13.87″N 135°21′16.71″E
- Operator: Hankyu Railway.
- Line: ■ Hankyu Imazu Line
- Distance: 8.6 km (5.3 miles) from Takarazuka
- Platforms: 2 side platforms

Other information
- Station code: HK-22
- Website: Official website

History
- Opened: May 10, 1927

Passengers
- FY2019: 2,438 daily
Location
- Location within Hyōgo Prefecture Location within Japan

Hanshin-Kokudō Station (阪神国道駅, Hanshin-kokudō-eki) is a passenger railway station located in the city of Nishinomiya Hyōgo Prefecture, Japan. It is operated by the private transportation company Hankyu Railway. The station name, meaning "Osaka–Kobe National Highway Station", is after Japan National Route 2 which passes near the station.

== Lines ==
Hanshin-Kokudō Station is served by the Hankyu Imazu Line, and is located 8.6 kilometers from the terminus of the line at Takarazuka and 0.9 kilometers from Nishinomiya-Kitaguchi.

== Layout ==
The station consists of two opposed elevated side platforms, with the station building underneath.

=== Platforms ===
1	■ Imazu Line	for Nishinomiya-Kitaguchi; Change at Nishinomiya-Kitaguchi for Osaka, Kobe, Kyoto and Takarazuka
2	■ Imazu Line	for Imazu

== Adjacent stations ==
«	Service	»
Nishinomiya-Kitaguchi	Local	Imazu

== History ==
Hanshin-Kokudō Station opened on May 10, 1927, the year after the opening of the line between Nishinomiya-Kitaguchi and Imazu.

== Passenger statistics ==
In fiscal 2019, the station was used by an average of 2,438 passengers daily. It is the least-used station in the whole Hankyu network.

== Surrounding area ==
- Japan National Route 2
- Nishinomiya Municipal Fukatsu Junior High School
- Nishinomiya Municipal Fukatsu Elementary School

== See also ==
- List of railway stations in Japan
