= Nishinomiya =

Nishinomiya 西宮市
- Core city
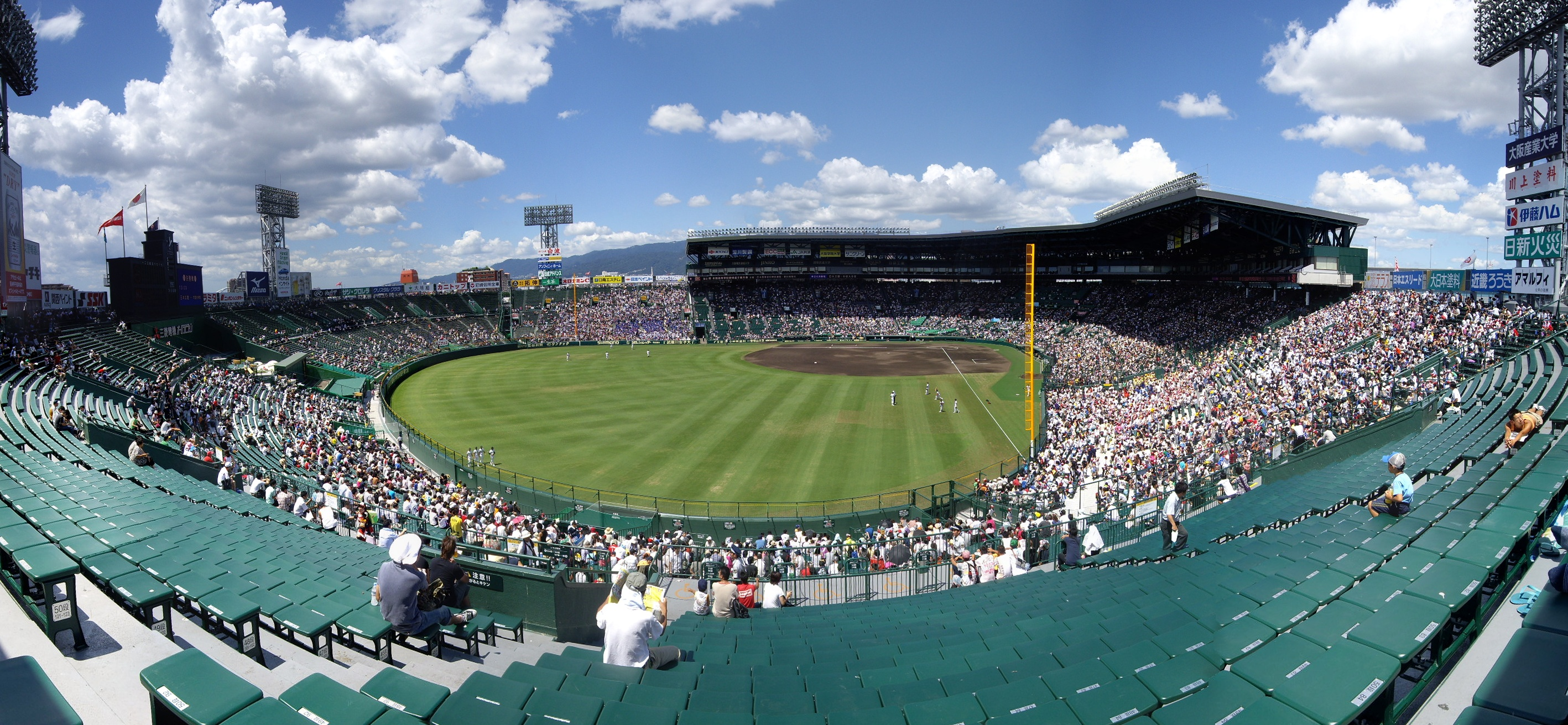
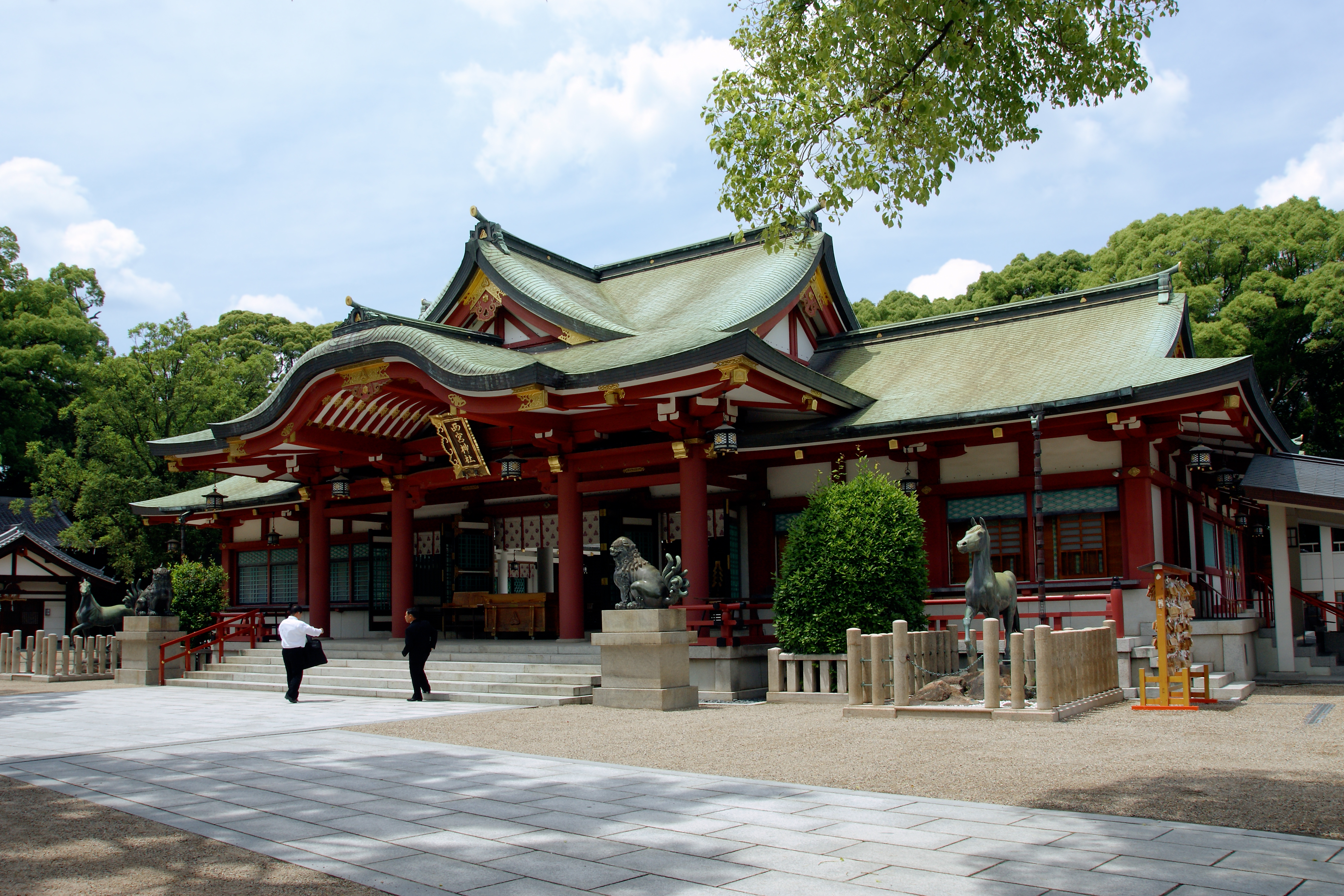
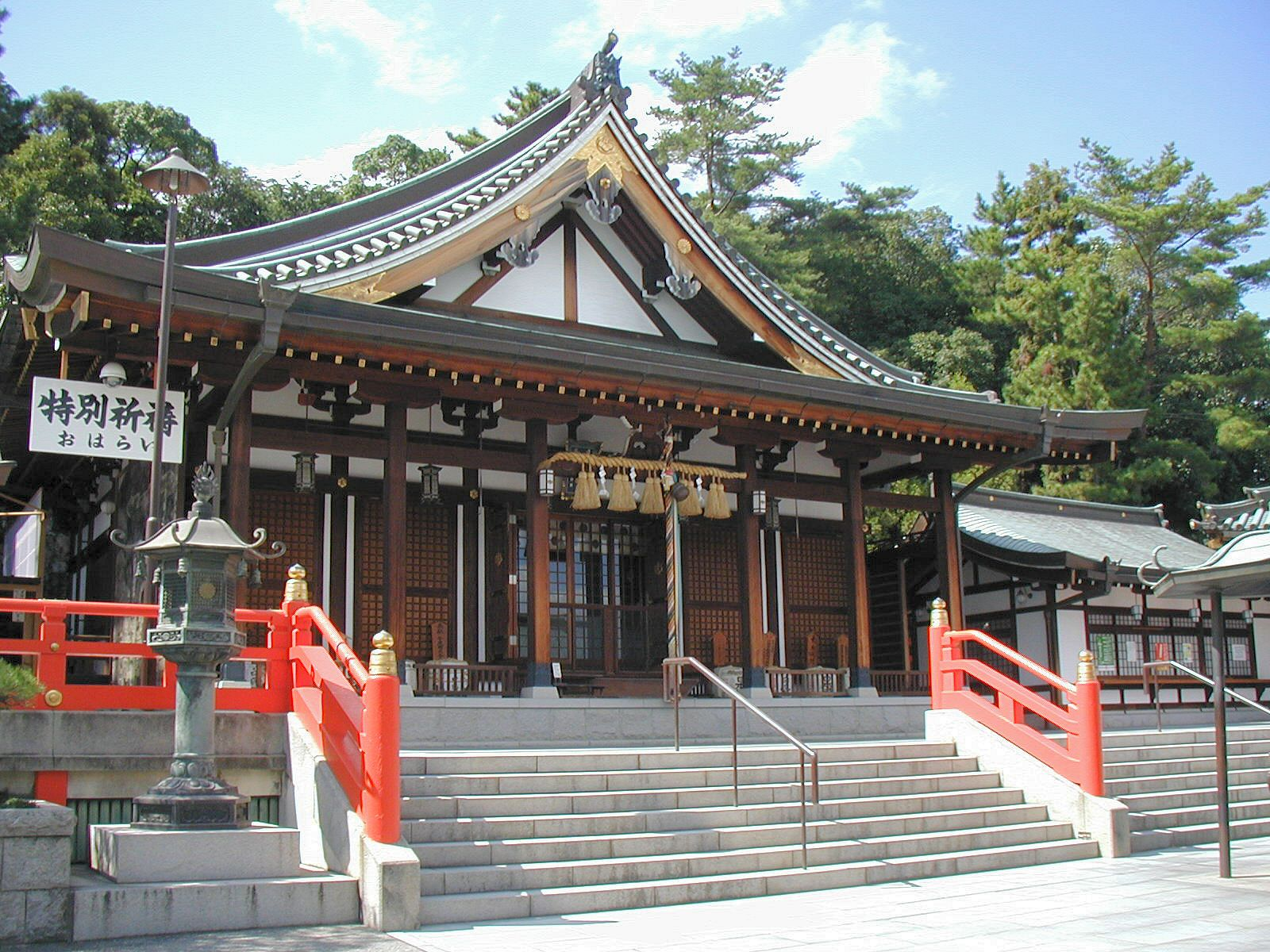
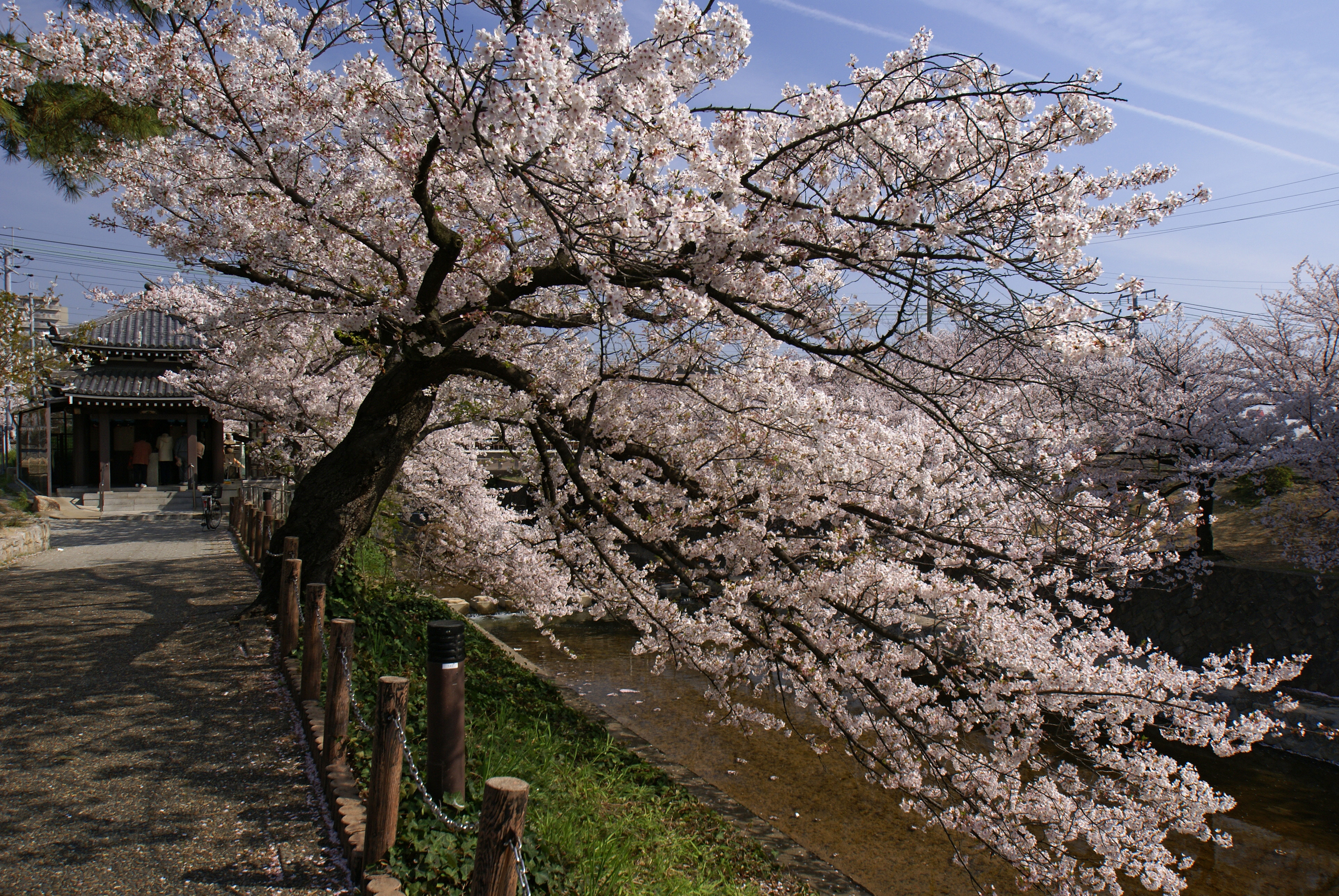
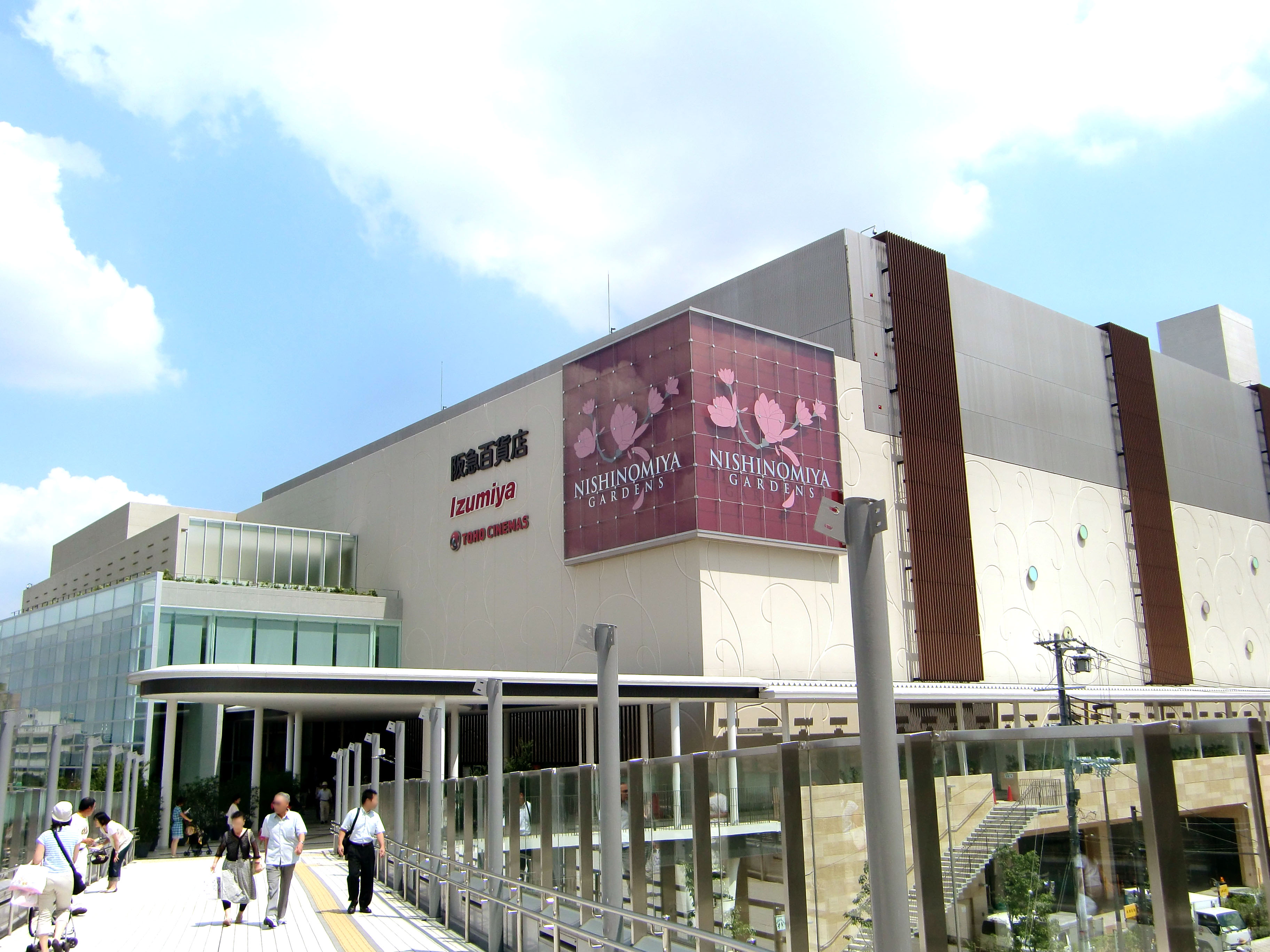
- From top left: Hanshin Koshien Stadium, Nishinomiya Shrine, Tōkō-ji, Shukugawa Park, and Hankyu Nishinomiya Gardens

- Flag Chapter
- Location of Nishinomiya in Hyōgo Prefecture

- Location in Japan
- Coordinates: 34°44′15.35″N 135°20′29.63″E
- Country: Japan
- Region: Kansai
- Prefecture: Hyōgo

Government
  - Mayor: Ishii Toshiro

Area
  - Total: 99.96 km^{2} (38.59 sq mi)

Population (May 1, 2021)
  - Total: 484,368
  - Density: 4,846/km^{2} (12,550/sq mi)
- Time zone: UTC+09:00 (JST)
- City hall address: 10-3 Rokutanji-chō, Nishinomiya-shi, Hyōgo-ken 662-8567
- Website: Official website
- Symbols
- Flower: Sakura
- Tree: Camphor laurel

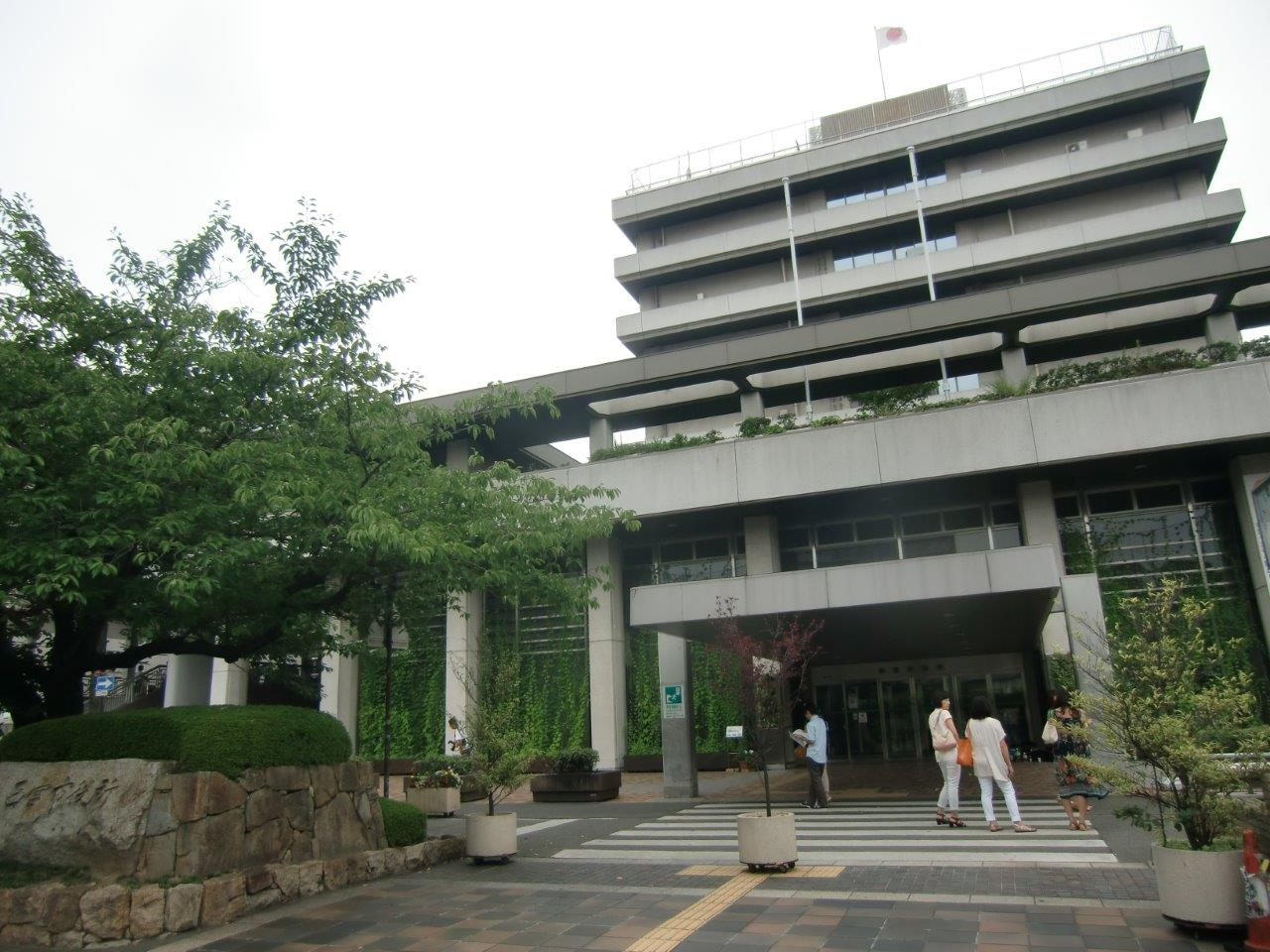
Nishinomiya City Hall

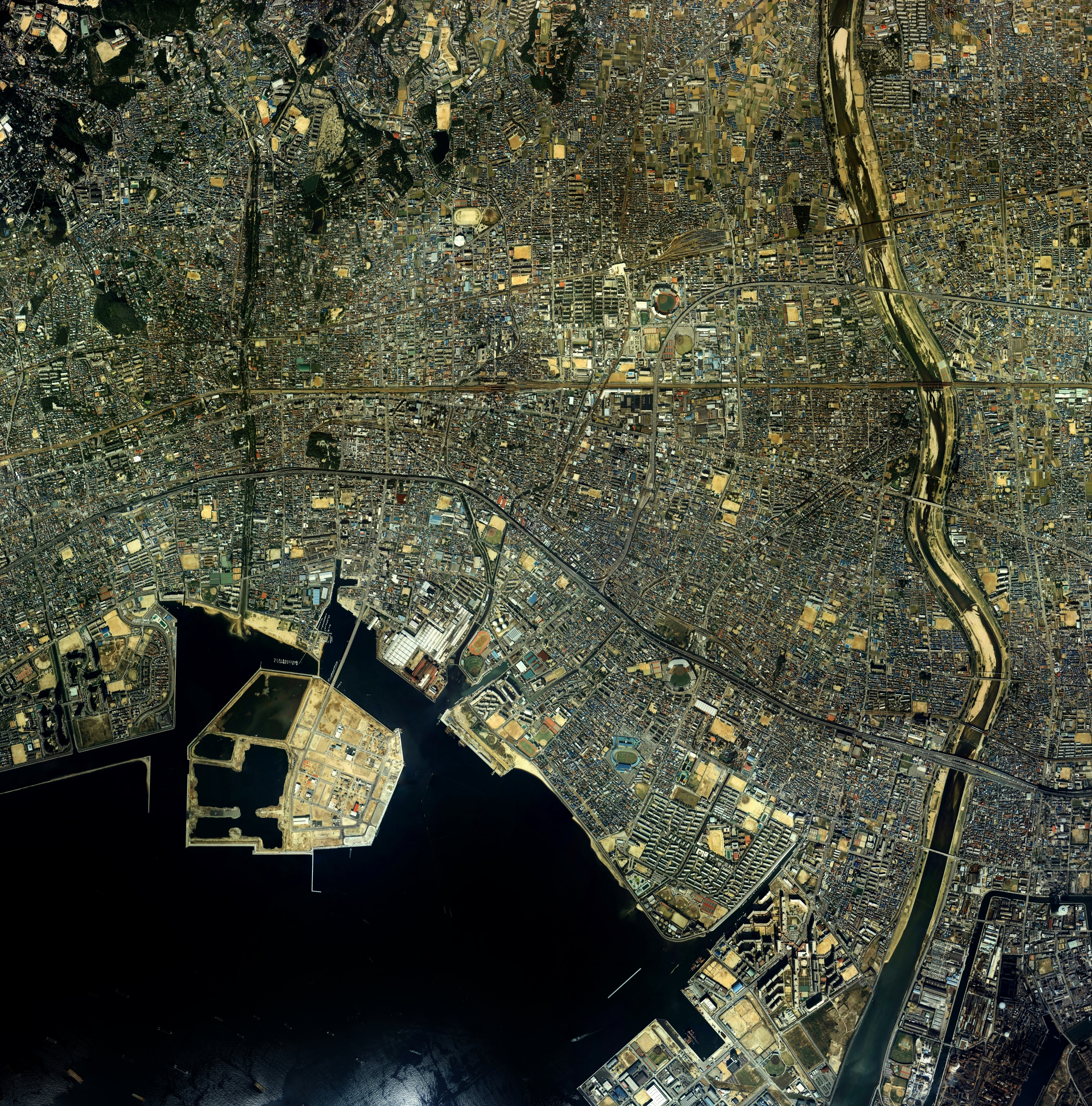
Aerial view of Nishinomiya city center 1985

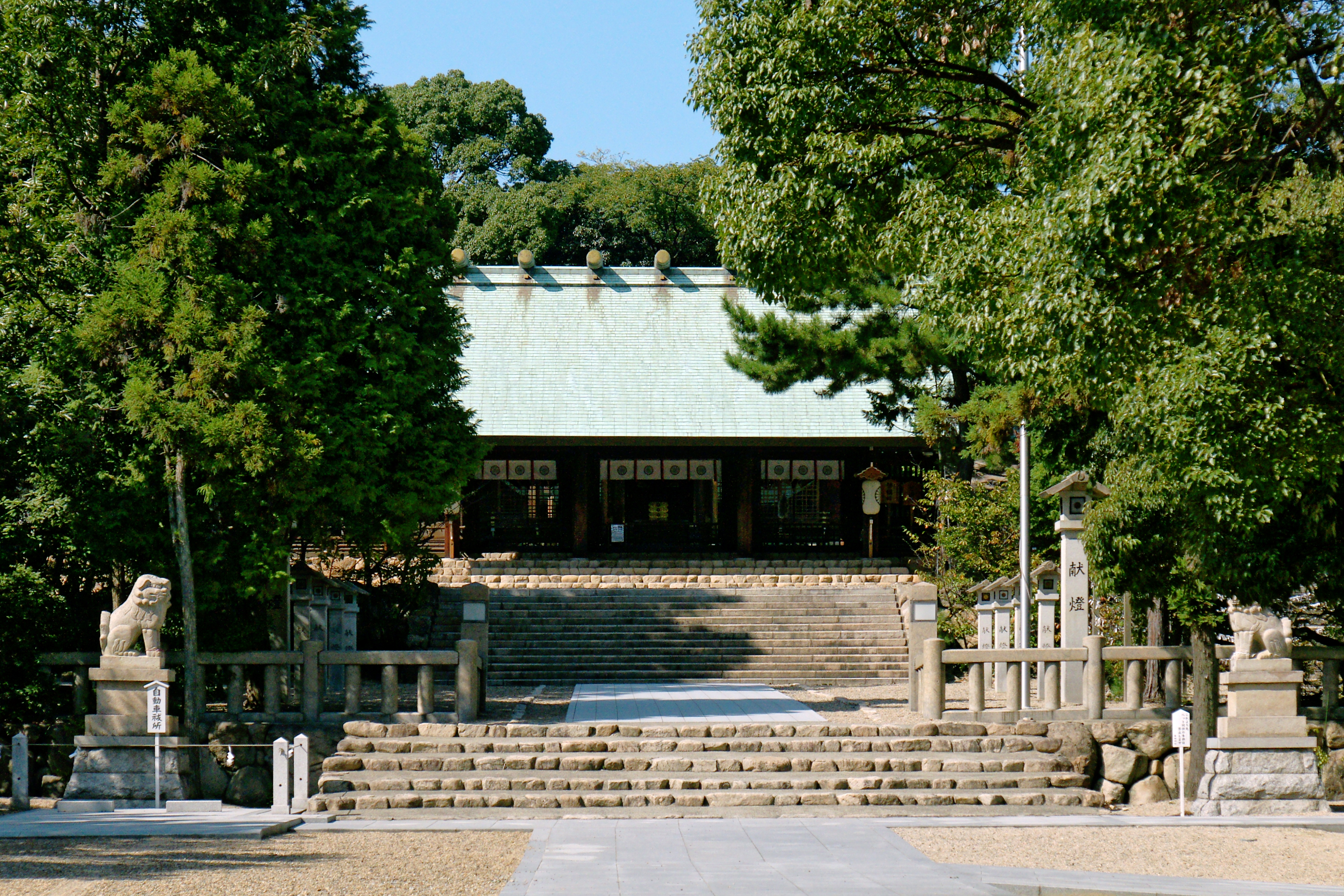
Hirota Shrine

Nishinomiya (西宮市, Nishinomiya-shi) is a city located in Hyōgo Prefecture, Japan. As of 1 November 2022, the city had an estimated population of 484,368 in 218,948 households and a population density of 4,800 persons per km^{2}. The total area of the city is 99.98 square kilometres (38.60 sq mi). Nishinomiya is an important commercial and shipping city in the Kansai region with the third largest population in Hyōgo Prefecture. Nishinomiya is best known as the home of Koshien Stadium, where the Hanshin Tigers baseball team plays home games and where Japan's annual high school baseball championship is held.

== Geography ==
Nishinomiya is located in southeast Hyōgo Prefecture between the cities of Kobe and Osaka. It is bordered by Osaka Bay to the south, the cities of Amagasaki, Itami and Takarazuka along the Mukogawa and Nigawa rivers to the east and by the Rokkō Mountains and Kobe to the north. The city can be divided into two areas: a mountainous area in the north and a coastal plain in the south. Situated in the middle is Mount Kabuto (309 meters), a landmark of the city.

=== Neighboring municipalities ===
Hyōgo Prefecture

- Amagasaki
- Ashiya
- Itami
- Kita-ku, Kobe
- Takarazuka

=== Climate ===
Nishinomiya has a humid subtropical climate (Köppen Cfa) characterized by warm summers and cool winters with light snowfall. The average annual temperature in Nishinomiya is 14.6 °C. The average annual rainfall is 1578 mm with September as the wettest month. The temperatures are highest on average in August, at around 26.4 °C, and lowest in January, at around 3.3 °C.

== Demographics ==
Per Japanese census data, the population of Nishinomiya grew rapidly in the 1950s and 1960s, and has been increasing at a slower rate since.

Historical population
Year	Pop.	±%
1920	60,311	—
1930	98,777	+63.8%
1940	169,770	+71.9%
1950	168,319	−0.9%
1960	262,608	+56.0%
1970	377,043	+43.6%
1980	410,329	+8.8%
1990	426,909	+4.0%
2000	438,105	+2.6%
2010	422,790	−3.5%

== History ==
The area of Nishinomiya was part of the ancient Settsu Province and has been inhabited since ancient times, with traces of Yayoi period settlements and many kofun burial mounds found within the city limits. From the Asuka period, the Hirota Shrine was built, and the market town which developed around its west gate was the ancestor of "Nishinomiya". From the Muromachi period, Nishinomiya was famed for its production of sake. During the Edo Period, the area was tenryō territory under the direct administration of the Tokugawa shogunate. The town of Nishinomiya was established on April 1, 1889 with the creation of the modern municipalities system. Nishinomiya was a center of the culture from the 1910s to 1940s in which has been dubbed "Hanshinkan Modernism". This included the opening of the Kōshien Stadium in April 1, 1924. Nishinomiya was elevated to city status on April 1, 1925. The city expanded with the annexation of the town of Imazu and villages of Shiba and Taishi in April 1933, the village of Koto in February 1941, the village of Kawaragi in May 1942, and the villages of Naruo, Yamaguchi and Shiose in April 1951. The January 17, 1995 Great Hanshin earthquake caused widespread damage in Nishinomiya.

== Government ==
Nishinomiya has a mayor-council form of government with a directly elected mayor and a unicameral city council of 41 members. Nishinomiya contributes seven members to the Hyōgo Prefectural Assembly. In terms of national politics, the city is divided between the Hyōgo 2nd district and Hyōgo 7th districts of the lower house of the Diet of Japan.

== Economy ==
In terms of industry, food and beverages (especially sake, which is a traditional industry) are a major portion of the local economy. The city is also located on a corner of the Hanshin industrial zone.

- Furuno, a global electronics company, whose main products include marine electronics and medical equipment, has its headquarters in the city.

=== Agriculture ===
Since most of the farmland is in the urban district, Nishinomiya agriculture is in a difficult situation; it worsens every year. Efforts are being made to improve farming, attempting to make it profitable by growing marketable products such as soft vegetables for the big markets of Osaka and Kobe. Other efforts include effective land use by growing crops in greenhouses using hydroponic techniques and development of techniques for safe products.

=== Residential districts ===
Nishinomiya is situated between the major cities of Kobe and Osaka. Luxury neighborhoods are common in the city, especially in areas near Ashiya. Some of the shopping malls in Nishinomiya are the Lalaport Koshien and the Hankyu Nishinomiya Gardens.

== Education ==
=== Universities and colleges ===
- Hyogo College Of Medicine
- Kobe College (Women's university)
- Konan University Nishinomiya Campus "Konan Cube"
- Koshien Junior College
- Kwansei Gakuin University, a private university founded by American missionaries in the nineteenth century.
- Mukogawa Women's University and Junior College
- Otemae University
- Seiwa College and Junior College
- Shukugawa Gakuin Junior College

=== Primary and secondary schools ===
Nishinomiya has 40 public elementary schools and 19 public middle schools operated by the city government, and nine public high schools operated by the Hyōgo Prefectural Board of Education. These nine include Hōtoku Gakuen High School, with a prominent baseball team, and Nishinomiya Kita High, the setting for much of The Melancholy of Haruhi Suzumiya. There are also two private elementary schools, seven private middle schools and seven private high schools. In addition, the city also operates one, and the prefecture operates two, special education schools for the physically challenged.

== Transportation ==
=== Railways ===
JR West - Kobe Line

- Kōshienguchi - Nishinomiya - Sakura Shukugawa

JR West - Fukuchiyama Line

- Namaze - Nishinomiyanajio - Takedao

Hankyu - Hankyu Kobe Main Line

- Nishinomiya-Kitaguchi - Shukugawa

Hankyu - Hankyu Imazu Line

- Kōtōen - Mondo-Yakujin - Nishinomiya-Kitaguchi - Hanshin-Kokudō - Imazu

Hankyu - Hankyu Kōyō Line

- Shukugawa - Kurakuenguchi - Kōyōen

Hanshin Electric Railway - Hanshin Main Line

- Naruo - Mukogawajoshidai-Mae - Kōshien - Kusugawa - Imazu - Nishinomiya - Kōroen

Hanshin Electric Railway - Hanshin Mukogawa Line

- Mukogawa - Higashi-Naruo - Suzaki - Mukogawadanchimae

=== Highways ===
- Meishin Expressway
- Chūgoku Expressway
- Hanshin Expressway Route 7 Kita-kobe Line
- National Route 2
- National Route 43
- National Route 171
- National Route 176

== International relations ==
Sister cities

- Spokane, Washington, United States, since September 1961

Friendship cities

- Londrina, Paraná, Brazil, since May 1977
- Shaoxing, Zhejiang, China, since July 1985
- District of Lot-et-Garonne and Agen, Nouvelle-Aquitaine, France, since April, 1992
- Burlington, Vermont, United States
- Amami, Kagoshima Prefecture, Japan, since October 1981 (formerly Naze)
- Yusuhara, Kōchi Prefecture, Japan, since March 1991

== Local attractions ==
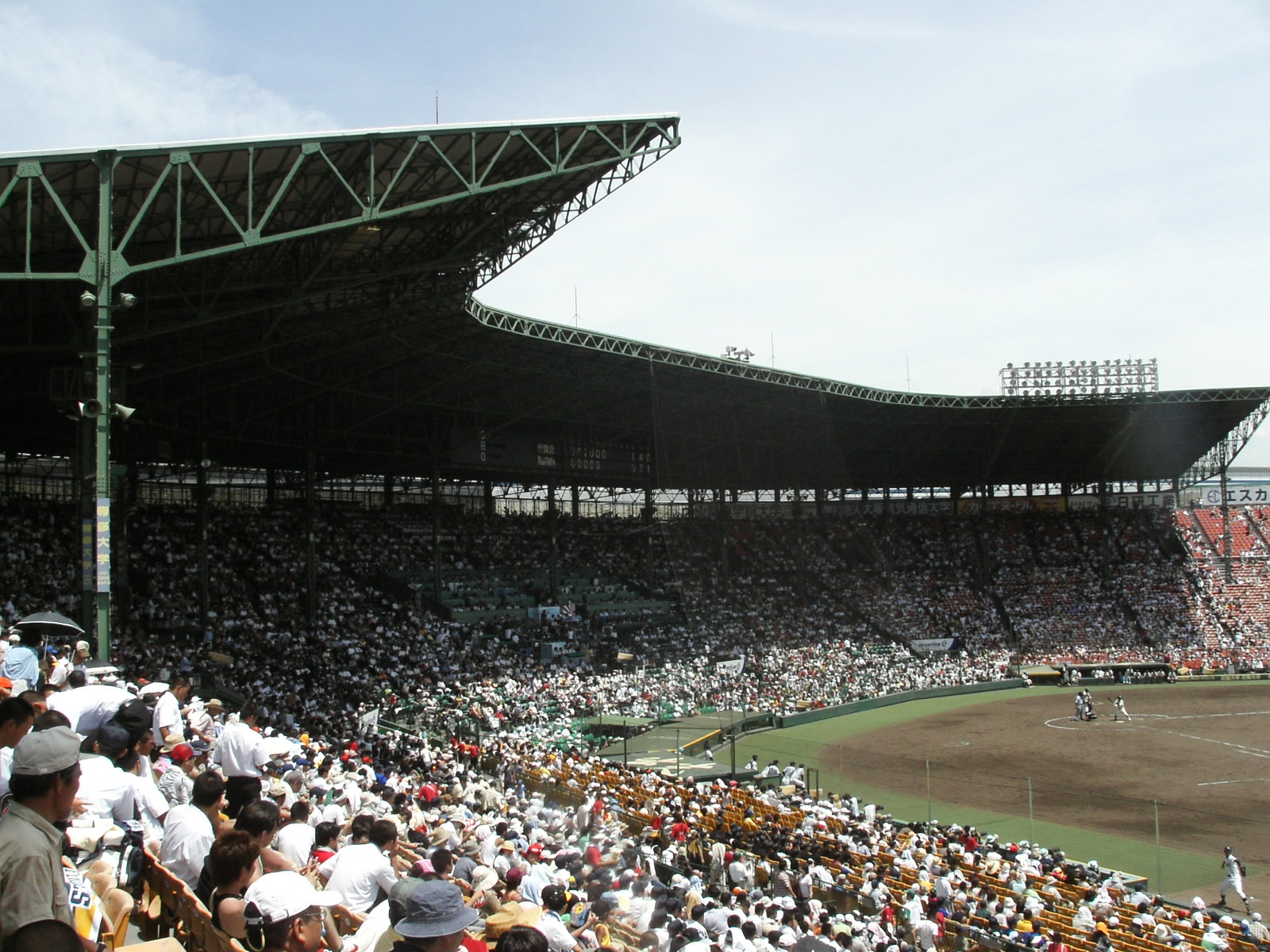
Koshien Stadium

- Arima Onsen(neighboring city, but formerly Arima County) – accessible via one bus ride from Nishinomiya Kitaguchi station and Shukugawa station and Hanshin Nishinomiya station and JR Nishinomiya station
- Hirota Shrine – aristocrats in Kyoto called the shrine Nishi no miya ("the West Shrine"); that is the origin of the city name.
- Hyogo Performing Arts Center
- Kannō-ji
- Kitayama Botanical Garden
- Koshikiiwa Shrine
- Mondo-yakujin (Tōkō-ji)
- Mount Kabuto
- Nishinomiya Shrine

== In popular culture ==
- Much of Grave of the Fireflies is set in Nishinomiya.
- Nishinomiya is the setting for the popular light novel, manga and anime series The Melancholy of Haruhi Suzumiya.

== Notable people from Nishinomiya ==
- Mana Ashida – actress
- Aimyon – singer-songwriter
- Kaoru Betto – baseball player
- Daisuke Inoue – inventor of the karaoke machine
- Kaoru – lead guitarist of Dir En Grey
- Rika Kihira – figure skater
- Hiro Matsushita – Businessman, former Champ Car World Series driver, chairman of Swift Engineering & Swift Xi Inc.
- Yuya Matsushita – singer and actor
- Mina – singer based in South Korea, member of the popular K-pop girl group TWICE
- Shizuka Miyaji – female cricketer
- Yuichiro Nagashima – kickboxer
- Ryusei Onishi – member of the boy band Naniwa Danshi
- Eizo Sakamoto – heavy metal musician
- Teruaki Satō - baseball player
- Ryūsui Seiryōin – novelist
- Daisuke Shima – actor and singer
- Nagaru Tanigawa – author of the light novel series Haruhi Suzumiya
- Akira Tozawa – professional wrestler
- Hōsei Yamasaki – comedian

== Gallery ==
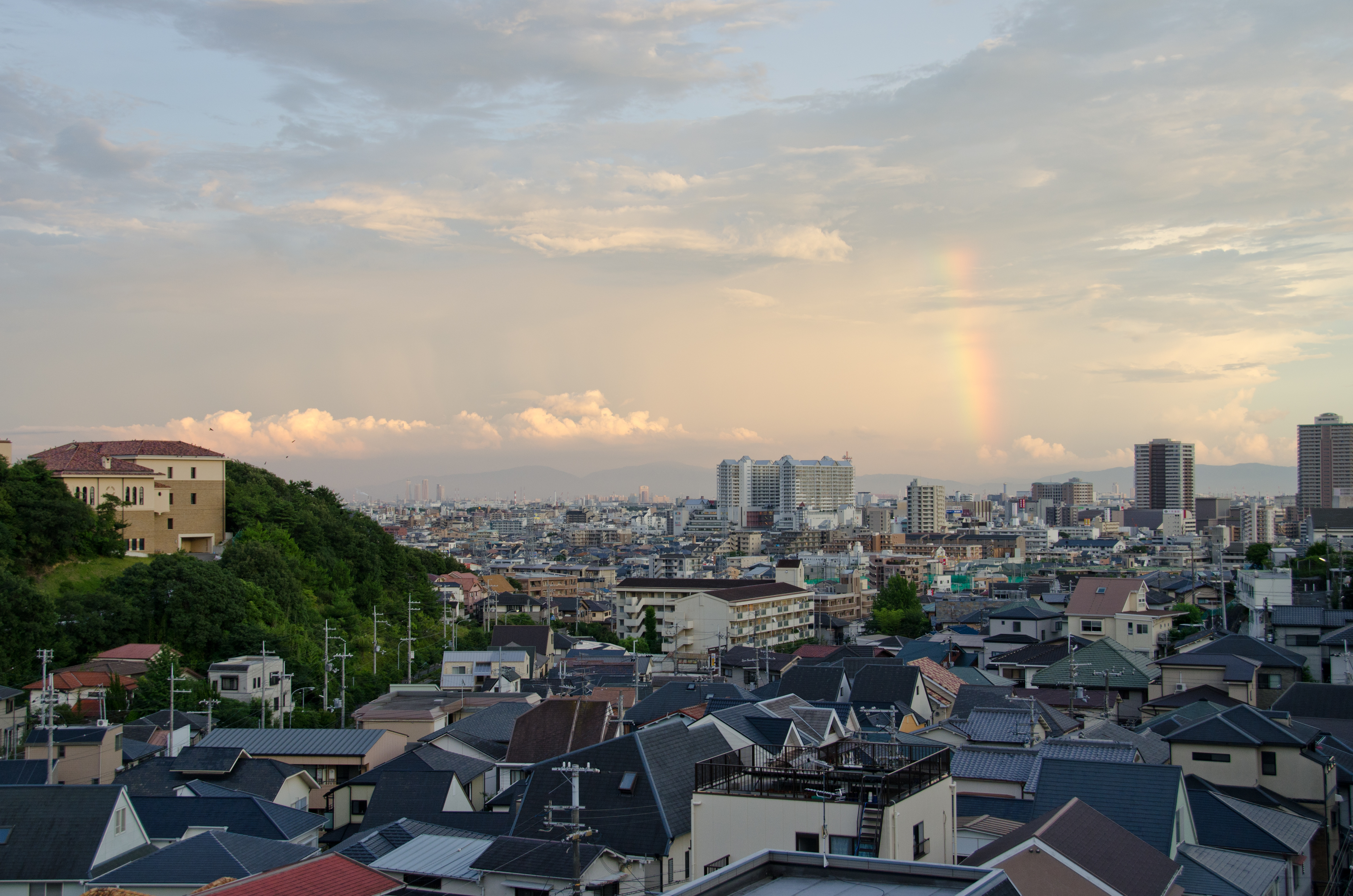
Nishinomiya cityscape
