= Hankyū Imazu Line =

Rail line in Japan

Hankyu Imazu Line
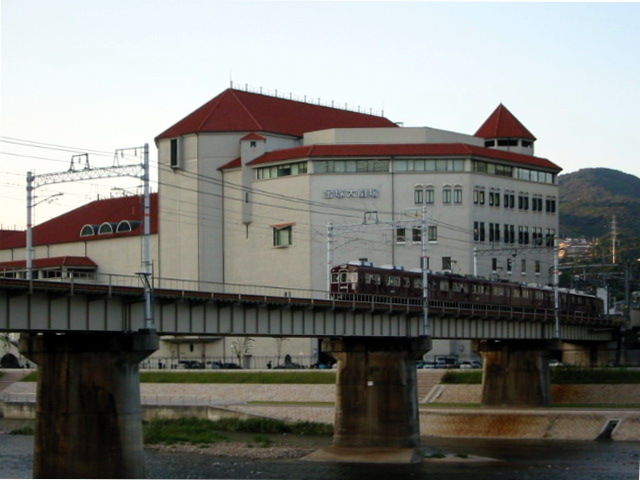
- The Hankyu Imazu Line with the Takarazuka Grand Theater in the background

Overview
- Native name: 阪急今津線
- Locale: Hyōgo Prefecture
- Stations: 10

Service
- Operator(s): Hankyu Railway
- Depot(s): Nishinomiya Depot

History
- Opened: 2 September 1921; 104 years ago

Technical
- Line length: 9.3 km (5.8 mi)
- Number of tracks: Double
- Track gauge: 1,435 mm (4 ft 8 1/2 in)
- Electrification: 1,500 V DC, overhead lines
- Operating speed: 80 km/h (50 mph)
Route map

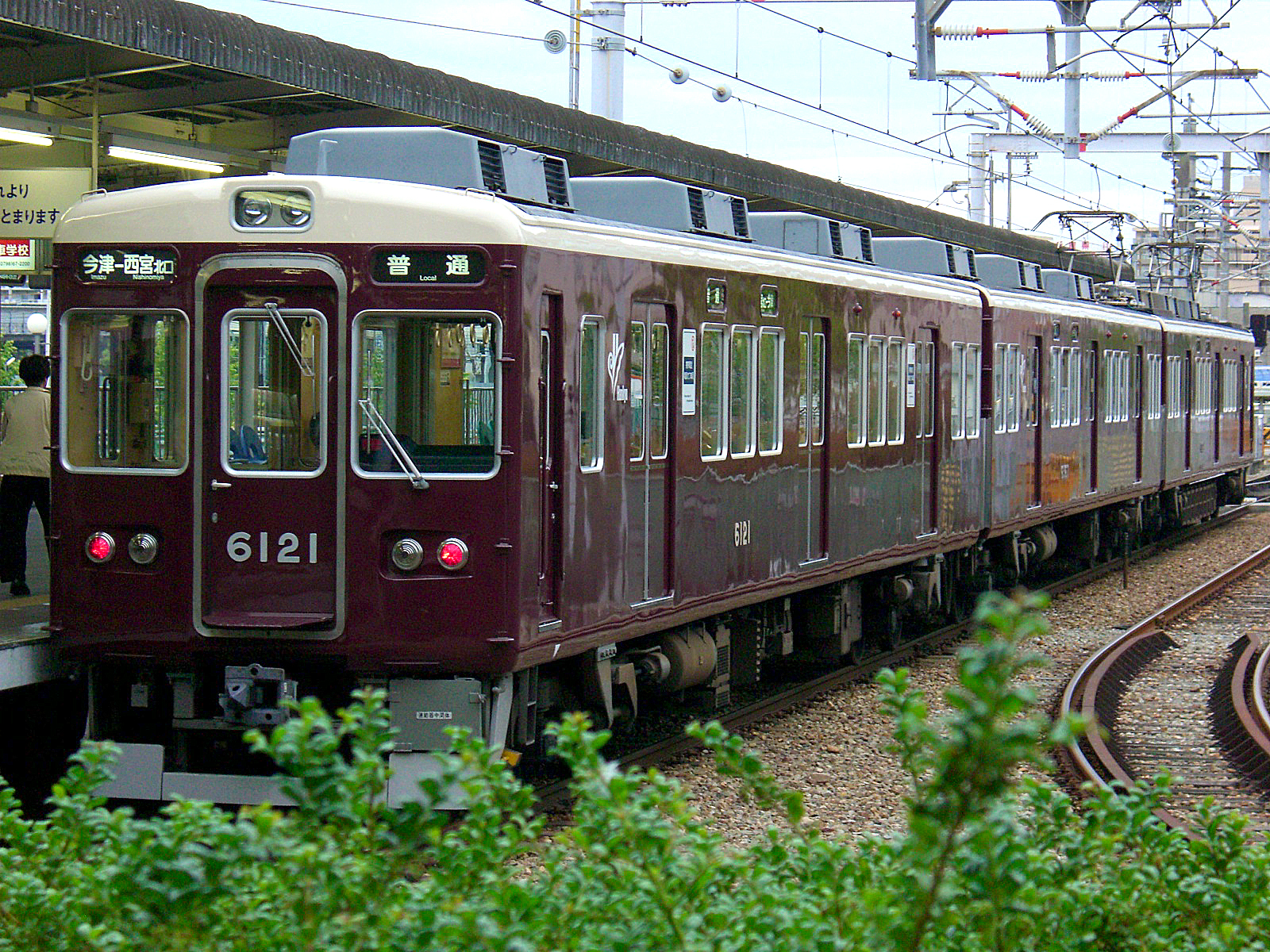
Imazu Line (south section) train

The Hankyu Imazu Line (阪急今津線, Hankyū Imazu-sen) is a 9.3 km long commuter rail line in Hyōgo Prefecture, Japan owned and operated by the private railway operator Hankyu Railway. It is the longest of three branchlines of the Hankyu Kobe Line. The line connects the cities of Nishinomiya and Takarazuka.

== Operation ==
The Imazu Line runs between Imazu Station and Takarazuka Station. However, no trains run directly from one end to the other because the tracks have split since 1984 at Nishinomiya-Kitaguchi Station, where the line crosses the Kobe Line. Typical Imazu Line trains stop every station between Imazu and Nishinomiya-Kitaguchi (south section) or Nishinomiya-Kitaguchi and Takarazuka (north section).

A small number of trains, called Semi-Express (junkyū), run from Takarazuka Station to Umeda Station (Hankyu's main terminal in Osaka) on weekdays not via the Takarazuka Line, but via the Imazu Line and the Kobe Line. Semi-Express trains of this route do not stop at Nishinomiya-Kitaguchi Station because of the layout of the track in the station; there is no platform for through trains. The distance between Takarazuka and Umeda stations via the Imazu Line is shorter than the route via the Takarazuka line.

== Stations ==
- All stations are in Hyōgo Prefecture
- Stops:
  - S: Semi-Express
  - E: Express (Rinji-Kyūkō)
- Pass: |

No.	Station	Japanese	km	S	E	Transfers	Location
South section
HK-21	Imazu	今津	9.3			Hanshin Main Line	Nishinomiya
HK-22	Hanshin-Kokudō	阪神国道	8.6				Nishinomiya
HK-08	Nishinomiya-Kitaguchi	西宮北口 (阪急西宮ガーデンズ前)	7.7			Hankyu Kobe Main Line; Hankyu Imazu Line (North section)	Nishinomiya
North section
HK-08	Nishinomiya-Kitaguchi	西宮北口	7.7	|	|	Hankyu Kobe Main Line; Hankyu Imazu Line (South section)	Nishinomiya
HK-23	Mondo-Yakujin	門戸厄神	6.4	S	|		Nishinomiya
HK-24	Kōtōen	甲東園	5.4	S	|		Nishinomiya
HK-25	Nigawa	仁川 (阪神競馬場前)	4.5	S	E		Takarazuka
HK-26	Obayashi	小林	2.8	S			Takarazuka
HK-27	Sakasegawa	逆瀬川	1.8	S			Takarazuka
HK-28	Takarazuka-Minamiguchi	宝塚南口 (宝塚ホテル前)	0.9	S			Takarazuka
HK-56	Takarazuka	宝塚 (宝塚大劇場前)	0.0	S		Hankyu Takarazuka Main Line; Fukuchiyama Line (JR Takarazuka Line)	Takarazuka

== Connections ==
- Hanshin Main Line at Imazu
- Hankyu Kobe Line at Nishinomiya-Kitaguchi
- Hankyu Takarazuka Line at Takarazuka
- Fukuchiyama Line at Takarazuka

== History ==
The section between Takarazuka and Nishinomiya-Kitaguchi opened on 2 September 1921, named the Nishi-Takarazuka Line (西宝塚線). The section from Nishinomiya-Kitaguchi to Imazu opened on 18 December 1926, and the line was renamed the Imazu Line.

== Attractions along the line ==
- Hanshin Racecourse near Nigawa Station
- Kwansei Gakuin University near Kotoen Station

== Culture ==
- Hankyū Densha
