= Station numbering =

Sign system used by some railway companies

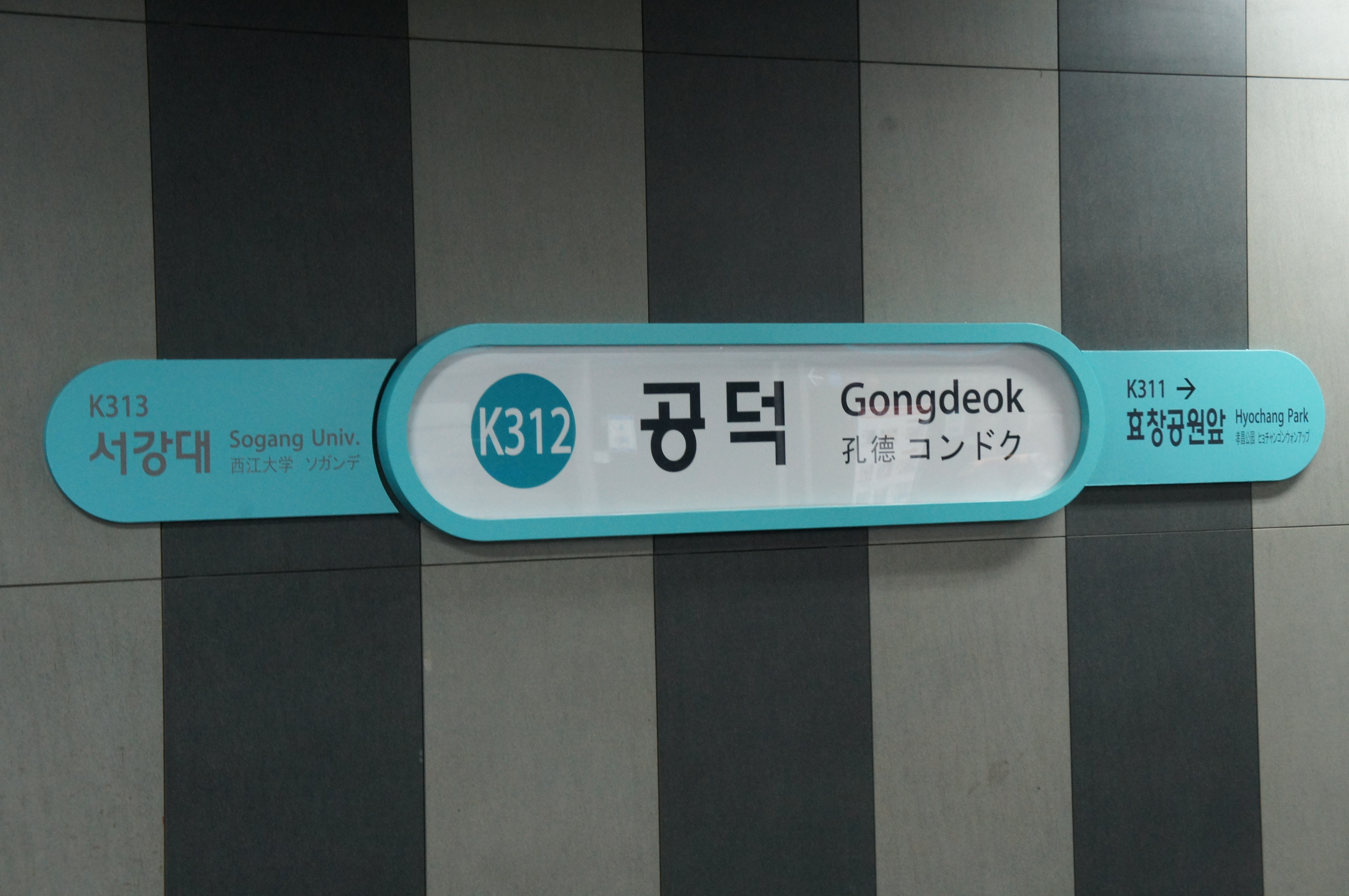
A running in board including the station number (K312) of Gyeongui–Jungang Line Gongdeok station, located in Seoul, Republic of Korea.

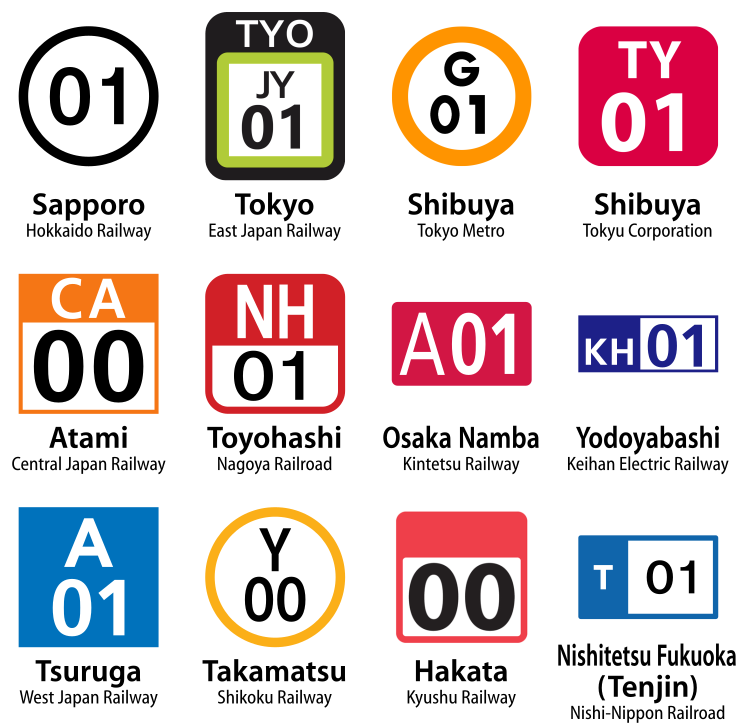
Examples of station number icons in Japan.

Station numbering is a sign system which assigns station codes consisting of a few letters and numbers to train stations. It aims to facilitate navigation for foreign travelers not familiar with the local language by using globally understood characters (Latin letters and Arabic numbers). The system is now in use by various railway companies around the world, including those in mainland China, Indonesia, Japan, South Korea, Singapore, Taiwan, Thailand, and the United States.

== History ==
Station numbering was first introduced—but to less fanfare—in South Korea, by the Seoul Metropolitan Subway in 1983 as a section of Seoul Subway Line 2 (Euljiro 1-ga to Seongsu) was opened.

Its first usage in Japan was in the Nagasaki Electric Tramway where it was introduced in May 1984. The Tokyo subway system introduced station numbering in 2004. Sports events are usually the turning point for the introduction of station numbering in Japan; the Yokohama Municipal Subway introduced station numbering in preparation for the 2002 FIFA World Cup and there was a mass adoption of station numbering in the months leading to the 2020 Summer Olympics.

== Structure ==
The station number often consists of two parts: the line symbol part, which contains the initial part of the line name or number (as seen below) and the station symbol part, which consists of the numerical positioning of the station relative to the railway line and its starting station number (example listed below)

=== Line symbol part ===
The line symbol part represents the railway line to which the station belongs. Therefore, all stations on the same railway line shares the same line symbol part.

In some countries, such as South Korea and mainland China, where the railway lines are often named with numbers (e.g. Line 1, Line 15), the number used to name the railway line is used as the line symbol.

In other countries, such as Japan, where the railway lines are often not named with numbers, the line symbol part usually consist of one or two letters, which are often abbreviations of the Romaji notation of the line name, many of them being the initials. However, when there are more than two lines with the same initials in the same region, either of them is often changed in order to avoid duplicated line symbols, even across different company lines (for example, the Tokyo Metro Marunouchi Line uses ‘M’ and the Toei Mita Line uses ‘I’, although the name of the two lines both starts with the letter M). Another method to avoid duplicated line symbols is to assign them in an alphabetical order (A to Z) without regard to the abbreviations.

While most of the station numbering systems follow the aforementioned two styles, there are a few exceptions. Shinbundang Line of Korea uses the line symbol of letter D, even though there is no notable reason preventing them from following the two popular styles presented above. Neo Trans, the line's operating company, mentions it is a part of their branding strategy: to emphasise the latest digital technologies applied to their railway line. Another group of examples of such exceptions is found among minor branch lines operated by Seibu Railway of Japan. One of their railway lines is the Seibu Ikebukuro Line, which has the line symbol of SI (the alphabet abbreviation of the line name). The Seibu Sayama Line, a branch line that splits off from Seibu Ikebukuro Line, shares the same line symbol of SI, even though its own alphabet abbreviation is not SI.

=== Station symbol part ===
The station symbol part is the part that identifies each station on the scale of one entire railway line. Therefore, there must not be any duplicated station symbols on the same railway line: no more than one station on the same railway line should have the identical station symbol.

In most of the cases, the station symbol is a two digit number. The starting station of a railway line is assigned a number which is often either 00 (e.g. JR Central) or 01 (e.g. Tokyo Metro), and stations along the line are distributed sequentially ascending whole numbers (i.e. If the starting station is assigned the number 01, the first station a person traveling outwards from the starting station would encounter will be assigned the number 02, then the station after this will be assigned 03, and so on). However, some railway lines assign the starting station number other than 00 or 01 to prevent duplicate numbers and potential renumbering in the future. An example of this can be seen on the 1 Line in Seattle, Washington, with Westlake station being given the code of "50" and subsequent numbers being based on Westlake's code. The use of 50 as a base code also prevents stations along the routes being assigned codes that may be superstitious to populations around stations.

As for any branch sections branching off from the main line (like a ‘Y’ shape track), there are several possible methods to number the stations located on the branch sections.

- Branch numbers (i.e. Seoul Subway Line 2 Seongsu Branch Line branches off from Main line of Line 2 at Seongsu station, which has the station number of 211. Thus, the stations located on the branch line are assigned station numbers of 211-1, 211-2, 211-3, and 211-4.)
- Prefix of letter 'P', the abbreviation of the word 'Point' (i.e. Seoul Subway Line 5 Macheon Branch Line branches off from Main line of Line 5 at Gangdong station, which has the station number of 548. Thus, the stations located on the branch line are assigned station numbers of P549, P550, P551, and (so on up to) P555.)
- Skipped numbers (i.e. Hankyu Koyo Line branches off from Hankyu Kobe Main Line at Shukugawa station, which has the station number of HK-09. Thus, the stations located on the Koyo Line are assigned station numbers of HK-29 and HK-30, which were the next numbers available)
- In some cases where there is a station located on the branch line branching off from the branch line of a main line, combined method of branch numbers and prefix of letter 'P' could be used (i.e. Seodongtan station of Seoul Subway Line 1, which has the station number of P157-1).
- Turning the branch line into a separate line (e.g. in Yokohama, the JR Yokohama Line branches off the JR Keihin-Tōhoku Line at Higashi-Kanagawa Station, which has the station code of JK13. The first stop after Higashi-Kanagawa Station is Ōguchi Station, which has the station number of JH14.)

Likewise, there are several possible methods to number the new stations constructed after the initial opening of the railway line. Written inside each bracket below are the station numbers which would be assigned to the new stations under each method, assuming an imaginary case where, for example, two new stations are added between stations of number 07 and 08.

- Shifting and renumbering the entire line
- Using branch numbers with a hyphen (07–1, 07–2)
- Using branch numbers without adding hyphen (071, 072)
- Using decimal numbers (07.5, 07.6)

== Train operating companies and metro systems using station numbering ==
=== Belarus ===
- Minsk Metro

=== China ===
- Chengdu Metro & Chengdu Tram line T2
- Chongqing Rail Transit
- Dongguan Rail Transit
- Foshan Metro, Gaoming Tram and Nanhai Tram
- Guangzhou Metro, Haizhu Tram and Huangpu Tram
- Macau Light Rapid Transit
- Wuxi Metro (currently only available on line 2 and line 3, no numbered signs on line 4, and numbers on line 1 cancelled after starting through train with line S1)
- Zhengzhou Metro
- formerly Beijing Subway (Line 1, 2, 13 and Batong Line), cancelled in 2007
- formerly Shanghai Metro Line 10, cancelled in 2022

=== Indonesia ===
- Greater Jakarta region
  - Transjakarta BRT
  - KRL Commuterline
  - Soekarno–Hatta Airport Rail Link
  - Jakarta MRT
  - Jakarta LRT
  - Greater Jakarta LRT
- Yogyakarta and Surakarta region
  - Adisumarmo Airport Rail Link
  - KAI Commuter Yogyakarta Line
  - Yogyakarta International Airport Rail Link
  - Batara Kresna Railbus

=== Japan ===
- Hokkaidō region
  - Hokkaido Railway Company, adopted on 1 October 2007
  - Sapporo Municipal Subway, adopted on 26 January 2006
  - Sapporo Streetcar, adopted on 1 April 2015
  - Hakodate Transportation Bureau
  - South Hokkaido Railway Company, adopted on 26 March 2016
- Tōhoku region
  - Kōnan Railway Company, adopted on 10 October 2020 for Ōwani Line, and 12 April 2021 for Kōnan Line
  - Sendai Subway, adopted in March 2015
- Kantō region
  - East Japan Railway Company, adopted on 20 August 2016 for metropolitan area, January 2018 for all Narita Line stations, November 2018 for all Tōkaidō Line and Itō Line stations, March 2019 for all Chūō Line Rapid stations, March 2020 for Chūō Line stations east of Kobuchizawa, and February 2025 for Chūō Main Line stations through to Shiojiri, as well as on the Shinonoi Line and the western half of the Shin'etsu Line.
    - Tokyo Monorail
    - Tokyo Waterfront Area Rapid Transit (Rinkai Line)
  - Tokyo Metro, adopted on 1 April 2004
  - Tokyo Metropolitan Bureau of Transportation
    - Toei Subway, adopted on 1 April 2004
    - Toden Arakawa Line and Nippori-Toneri Liner, adopted in November 2017
  - Tokyo Waterfront New Transit (Yurikamome), adopted on 27 March 2006
  - Keisei Electric Railway, adopted on 17 July 2010
    - Shin-Keisei Electric Railway, adopted in February 2014
    - Hokusō Railway, adopted on 17 July 2010
    - Shibayama Railway, adopted on 17 July 2010
  - Keikyu, adopted on 21 October 2010
  - Tokyu Corporation, adopted in February 2012
    - Yokohama Minatomirai Railway (Minatomirai Line), adopted in September 2012
  - Tobu Railway, adopted on 17 March 2012
  - Seibu Railway, adopted in March 2013
  - Keio Corporation, adopted on 22 February 2013
  - Odakyu Electric Railway, adopted in January 2014
    - Include Hakone Tozan Railway, Hakone Ropeway and Hakone Sightseeing Cruise
  - Sagami Railway (Sotetsu), adopted in February 2014
  - Metropolitan Intercity Railway Company (Tsukuba Express), adopted on 24 August 2005
  - Watarase Keikoku Railway (Watarase Keikoku Line), adopted on 22 March 2017
  - Saitama New Urban Transit (New Shuttle), adopted on 23 March 2018
  - Saitama Railway Corporation (Saitama Rapid Railway Line), adopted in 2016
  - Chichibu Railway, adopted in September 2022
  - Ryutetsu (Nagareyama Line), adopted in May 2018
  - Chiba Urban Monorail, adopted in February 2019
  - Tōyō Rapid Railway (Tōyō Rapid Railway Line), adopted on 15 March 2014
  - Chōshi Electric Railway Line, adopted on 23 November 2018
  - Tokyo Tama Intercity Monorail (Tama Toshi Monorail), adopted in February 2018
  - Yokohama Municipal Subway, adopted in 2002
  - Kanazawa Seaside Line, adopted in 2010
  - Enoshima Electric Railway, adopted on 9 June 2011
  - Shonan Monorail
  - Tokyo BRT, adopted on 1 October 2020
- Chūbu region
  - Central Japan Railway Company, adopted in March 2018
  - East Japan Railway Company, only on their Ōito Line section, adopted on 12 December 2016
  - Izukyū Corporation, adopted in December 2016
  - Izuhakone Railway
  - Gakunan Electric Train (Gakunan Railway Line), adopted in April 2020
  - Fuji Kyuko, adopted on 1 July 2011
  - Nagano Electric Railway
  - Ueda Kōtsū (Ueda Electric Railway Bessho Line), adopted on 1 April 2016
  - Alpico Kōtsū, adopted in March 2017
  - Toyama Chihō Railway, adopted on 9 February 2019 for tram routes, 16 March for rail lines, and 21 March 2020 for Toyamakō Line (during merging of the Toyama Light Rail company)
  - Hokuriku Railroad, adopted on 1 April 2019
  - Echizen Railway, adopted on 25 March 2017
    - Fukui Railway
  - Nagaragawa Railway (Etsumi-Nan Line), adopted in 2017
  - Akechi Railway, adopted in 2017
  - Shizuoka Railway, adopted on 1 October 2011
  - Enshū Railway Line, adopted in December 2007
  - Toyohashi Railroad, adopted in 2007 for Azumada Main Line, and 2008 for Atsumi Line
  - Nagoya Municipal Subway, adopted on 6 October 2004
    - Nagoya Guideway Bus (Yutorito Line)
    - Nagoya Rinkai Rapid Transit (Aonami Line)
  - Aichi Rapid Transit (Linimo), adopted on 6 March 2005
  - Aichi Loop Line, adopted on 1 April 2004
  - Meitetsu, adopted in March 2016
  - Tarumi Railway (Tarumi Line)
- Kansai (Kinki and Chūgoku) region
  - West Japan Railway Company, adopted on 6 August 2014
  - Ise Railway, adopted on 1 August 2008
  - Nankai Electric Railway, adopted on 23 February 2012
    - Semboku Rapid Railway
    - Hankai Tramway
  - Willer Trains (Kyoto Tango Railway), adopted in 2015
  - Osaka Monorail, adopted on 19 March 2007
  - Osaka Metro, adopted on 1 July 2004
    - Kita-Osaka Kyuko Railway
  - Kintetsu Railway, adopted on 27 March 2006 for Nara Line, and 20 August 2015 for the rest
  - Kobe Municipal Subway, adopted on 1 September 2004
  - Kobe New Transit, adopted on 2 February 2006
  - Hankyu, adopted on 21 December 2013
    - Nose Electric Railway
  - Hanshin Electric Railway, adopted in April 2014
  - Sanyo Electric Railway, adopted on 7 February 2014
  - Kobe Electric Railway, adopted on 1 April 2014
  - Keihan Electric Railway, adopted on 1 April 2014
  - Kyoto Municipal Subway, adopted on 26 November 2004
  - Keifuku Electric Railroad, adopted on 19 March 2007
  - Eizan Electric Railway, adopted on 19 October 2008
  - Ohmi Railway, adopted in 2018
  - Wakayama Electric Railway (Kishigawa Line), adopted in 2015
  - Okayama Electric Tramway, adopted in May 2017
  - Mizushima Rinkai Railway, adopted in 2019
  - Hiroshima Electric Railway, adopted in October 1996
  - Ichibata Electric Railway
- Shikoku region
  - Shikoku Railway Company, Asa Seaside Railway (Asatō Line) and Tosa Kuroshio Railway, adopted on 1 March 2006
    - Tosa Kuroshio Railway cancelled station numbers in December 2021, as route service replaced by dual-mode vehicles.
  - Takamatsu-Kotohira Electric Railroad, adopted on 15 December 2013
  - Iyotetsu, adopted in June 2015
- Kyūshū region
  - Kyushu Railway Company, adopted on 30 September 2018
  - Fukuoka City Subway, adopted on 24 January 2011
  - Nishi-Nippon Railroad, adopted on 1 February 2017
    - Chikuhō Electric Railroad Line, adopted on 28 January 2013
  - Kitakyushu Monorail
  - Heisei Chikuhō Railway, adopted on 1 October 2019
  - Nagasaki Electric Tramway, adopted on 30 May 1984
  - Kumamoto City Transportation Bureau, adopted on 1 March 2011
  - Kumamoto Electric Railway, adopted on 1 October 2019
  - Hisatsu Orange Railway, adopted on 1 October 2019
  - Kumagawa Rail Road (Yunomae Line)
  - Kagoshima City Transportation Bureau, adopted in April 2018
  - Okinawa Urban Monorail, adopted on 1 October 2019

=== Korea, Republic of ===
- Korail
- Seoul Metropolitan Subway
  - Seoul Metro, adopted in c. 1982–1983
  - Incheon Subway
  - Seoul Metro Line 9 Corporation
  - Airport Railroad Corporation (AREX)
  - Yongin Rapid Transit Corporation (Everline)
  - Uijeongbu LRT Corporation (U Line)
  - NeoTrans Co. Ltd. (Shinbundang Line)
  - E-Rail (Seohae Line)
- Busan Metro
- Busan–Gimhae Light Rail Transit Operation Corporation
- Daegu Metro
- Daejeon Metro
- Gwangju Metro

=== Malaysia ===
- Klang Valley Integrated Transit System (stations)

=== Philippines ===
- Manila
  - LRT (LRT-2)
  - MRT (MRT-3)

=== Saudi Arabia ===
- Riyadh Metro

=== Singapore ===
- MRT (stations)
- LRT (stations)

=== Taiwan ===
- Taiwan Railways Administration
- Taiwan High Speed Rail
- Taipei Metro
- New Taipei Metro
- Taoyuan Metro
- Taichung MRT
- Kaohsiung Metro

=== Thailand ===
- Mass Rapid Transit Master Plan in Bangkok Metropolitan Region
  - BTS Skytrain
  - Metropolitan Rapid Transit
  - Airport Rail Link
  - SRT Red Lines

=== United Arab Emirates ===
- Dubai Metro

=== United States ===
- MARTA (Atlanta) (stations)
- Sound Transit (Seattle) (stations), adopted on 30 August 2024

=== Vietnam ===
- Hanoi Metro
- Ho Chi Minh City Metro

== See also ==
- Station code
