= Shukugawa Station =

Railway station in Nishinomiya, Hyōgo Prefecture, Japan

Shukugawa Station 夙川駅
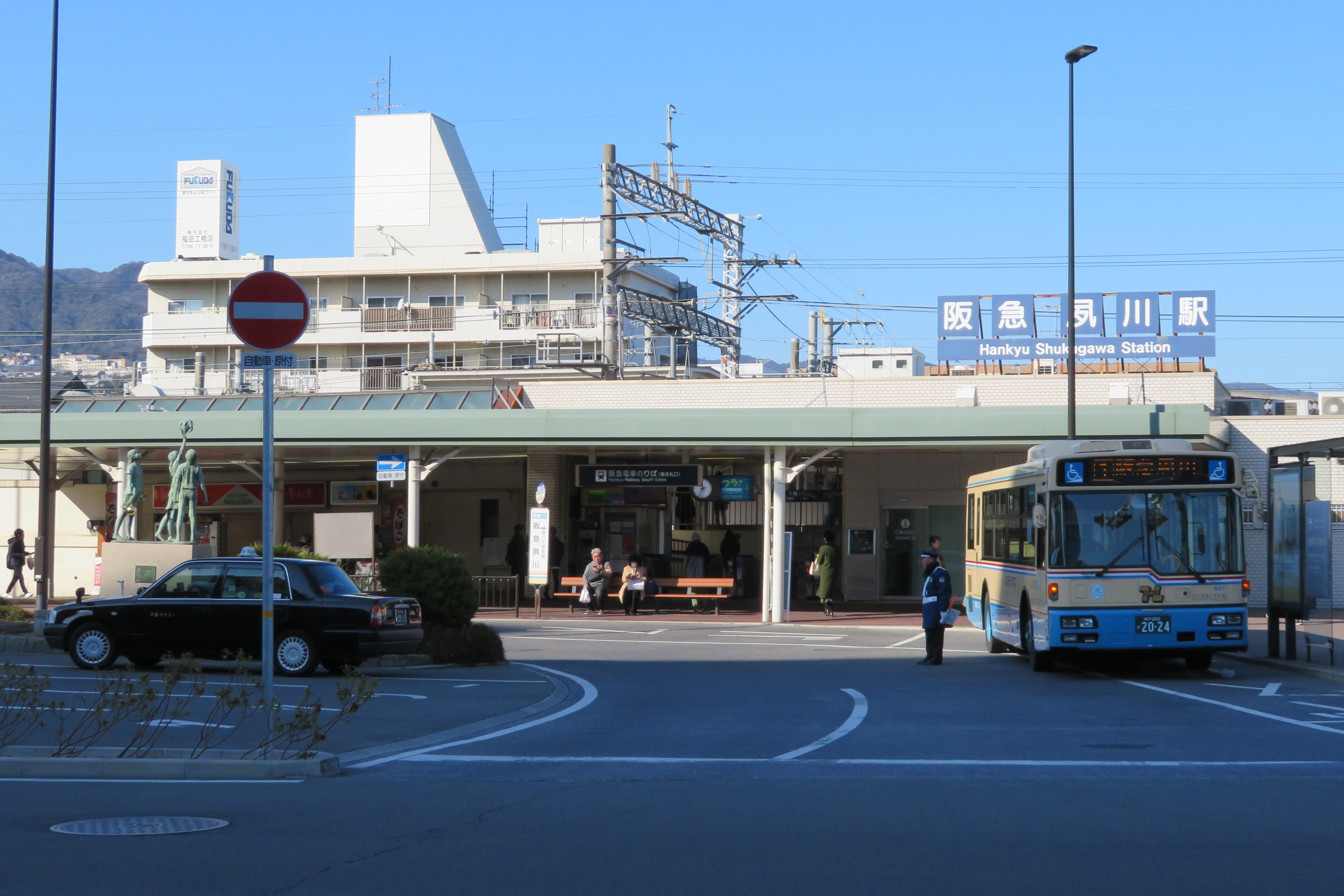

General information
- Location: 2-1 Aioichō, Nishinomiya-shi, Hyōgo-ken 662-0063; Japan
- Coordinates: 34°44′31.84″N 135°19′40.96″E
- Operator: Hankyu Railway
- Lines: Kōbe Main Line; Kōyō Line
- Distance: 18.3 km (11.4 miles) from Osaka-umeda
- Platforms: 3 side platforms
- Tracks: 2
- Connections: Bus terminal

Other information
- Status: Staffed
- Station code: HK-09
- Website: Official website

History
- Opened: 16 July 1920

Passengers
- FY2019: 27,345 daily

Services
Preceding station	Hankyu Railway	Following station
Nishinomiya-Kitaguchi HK 08 towards Osaka-umeda	Kōbe Main Line Local Commuter Express Express	Ashiyagawa HK 10 towards Kobe-Sannomiya
Nishinomiya-Kitaguchi HK 08 towards Osaka-umeda	Kōbe Main Line Semi-Limited Express Commuter Limited Express Limited Express Atago	Okamoto HK 11 towards Kobe-Sannomiya
Terminus	Kōyō Line	Kurakuenguchi HK 29 towards Kōyōen
Location
- Location within Hyōgo Prefecture Location within Japan

Shukugawa Station (夙川駅, Shukugawa-eki; station number: HK-09) is a passenger railway station located in the Aioichō neighborhood of the city of Nishinomiya, Hyōgo Prefecture, Japan. It is operated by the private transportation company Hankyu Railway.

== Lines ==
Shukugawa Station is served by the Hankyu Kobe Line, and is located 18.3 kilometres (11.4 miles) from the terminus of the line at Osaka-umeda. It is also a terminus of the 2.2 km (1.4 mi) long Hankyu Kōyō Line.

=== Layout ===
The station is an above-ground station with two opposed side platforms for the Kobe Main Line and a single side platform for the Kōyō Line. The Kōyō Line platform extends vertically to the north of the Kobe Main Line platform bound for Osaka. There used to be two lines on the Kōyō Line, but the tracks on the west side have been removed. Each platform is connected by an underground passage. The Kobe Main Line platform straddles the Shukugawa River in part on the east side, and the Kōyō Line platform is located on the west bank of the Shukugawa River. Ticket gates are located in the north and south. There is a bypass between the Kobe Line and the Koyo Line near the north ticket gates, which is used for the trains of the Koyo Line heading to and from Nishinomiya Depot in the east of Nishinomiya-Kitaguchi Station.

=== Platforms ===
(4)	■ Kōbe Line	for Rokkō, Kobe-sannomiya, Shinkaichi and the Sanyo Railway Main Line
(5)	■ Kōbe Line	for Nishinomiya-Kitaguchi, Ōsaka (Umeda), Kyōto, Takarazuka
(3)	■ Kōyō Line	for Kōyōen

== History ==
Shukugawa Station opened on 16 July 1920.

1934 was the start of service on the Koyo Line.

The station was damaged by the Great Hanshin earthquake in January 1995. Restoration work on the Kobe Line took 7 months to complete.

In 2006, the platforms were extended to support 10-car trains.

Station numbering was introduced on 21 December 2013, with Shukugawa being designated as station number HK-09.

== Passenger statistics ==
In fiscal 2019, the station was used by an average of 27,345 passengers daily

== Surrounding area ==
- Shukugawa River
- Shukugawa Park
- Shukugawa Green Town
- Otemae University Sakura Shukugawa Campus (大手前大学)
- Sakura Shukugawa Station (JR West)
- Koroen Station (Hanshin Railway)
- Yamate Kansen

=== Bus stops ===
Hankyu Shukugawa (Hankyu Bus Co.)
- Bus stop 1 (Nishinomiya Route, Nishinomiya Namboku Bus)
  - Route 1 for Gogaike via Kayandōchō, Jūrin-ji, Nishinomiya Kabutoyama High School, Kabutoyama Cemetery and Kabutoyama Daishi
  - Route 1 for Nishinomiya Kabutoyama High School via Kayandōchō and Jūrin-ji
  - Route 2 for Kabutoyam Villa via Kayandōchō, Jūrin-ji, Kabutoyama Cemetery and Nishinomiya Kabutoyama High School
  - Route 2 for Kabutoyama Cemetery via Kayandōchō and Jūrin-ji
  - Route 3 for Kentani via Kayandōchō
  - Sakura-Yamanami Bus for Narai via Kayandōchō, Nishinomiya Kabutoyama High School, Arima Onsen and Sumiredai
  - Sakura-Yamanami Bus for Hankyu Bus Yamaguchi Office via Kayandōchō, Nishinomiya Kabutoyama High School, Shimo-Yamaguchi, Kita-Rokkodai and Nishinomiya-kita Interchange
  - Route 1 and 2 for Nishinomiya-Kitaguchi via JR Sakura Shukugawa, Nishinomiyaebisu and JR Nishonimiya
  - Route 6 for Nishinomiya-Kitaguchi via Hanshin Kōroen, Hanshin Nishonimiya-eki Higashi and JR Nishonimiya-eki Kita (operated on Saturdays)
  - Route 7 for Nishinomiya-Kitaguchi via JR Sakura Shukugawa, Nishinomiyaebisu Egamichō and JR Nishonimiya (operated on Saturdays)
  - Sakura-Yamanami Bus for Nishinomiya-Kitaguchi via JR Sakura Shukugawa, Nishinomiyaebisu and JR Nishonimiya
- Bus stop 2 (Ashiya Route)
  - Route 4 for Oimatsuchō, Hinodebashi and Kurakuen
  - Route 11 for Hankyu Bus Ashiyahama Office via Kurakuen, Hinodebashi, JR Ashiya, Hanshin Ashiya, Shiomichō and Wakabachō
  - Route 13 for Hankyu Bus Ashiyahama Office via Kurakuen, Hinodebashi, JR Ashiya, Hankyu Ashiyagawa, Hanshin Ashiya, Shiomichō and Wakabachō
Hankyu Shukugawa (Hanshin Bus Co.)
- Bus stop 1 (Jūrinji Route)
  - Route 7 for Shin-Kōyō via Kayandōchō, Jūrin-ji, Nishinomiya Kabutoyama High School, Kabutoyama Cemetery, Kabutoyama Daishi and Kabutoyama Forest Park
Shukugawa Green Town (Minato Kanko)
- Route 12 for Rokko Island via Hankyu Okamoto and Hanshin Mikage

== See also ==
- List of railway stations in Japan
