= Koshikiiwa Shrine =

Shinto shrine in Hyōgo Prefecture, Japan

Koshikiiwa Jinja (越木岩神社, Koshikiiwa-jinja)
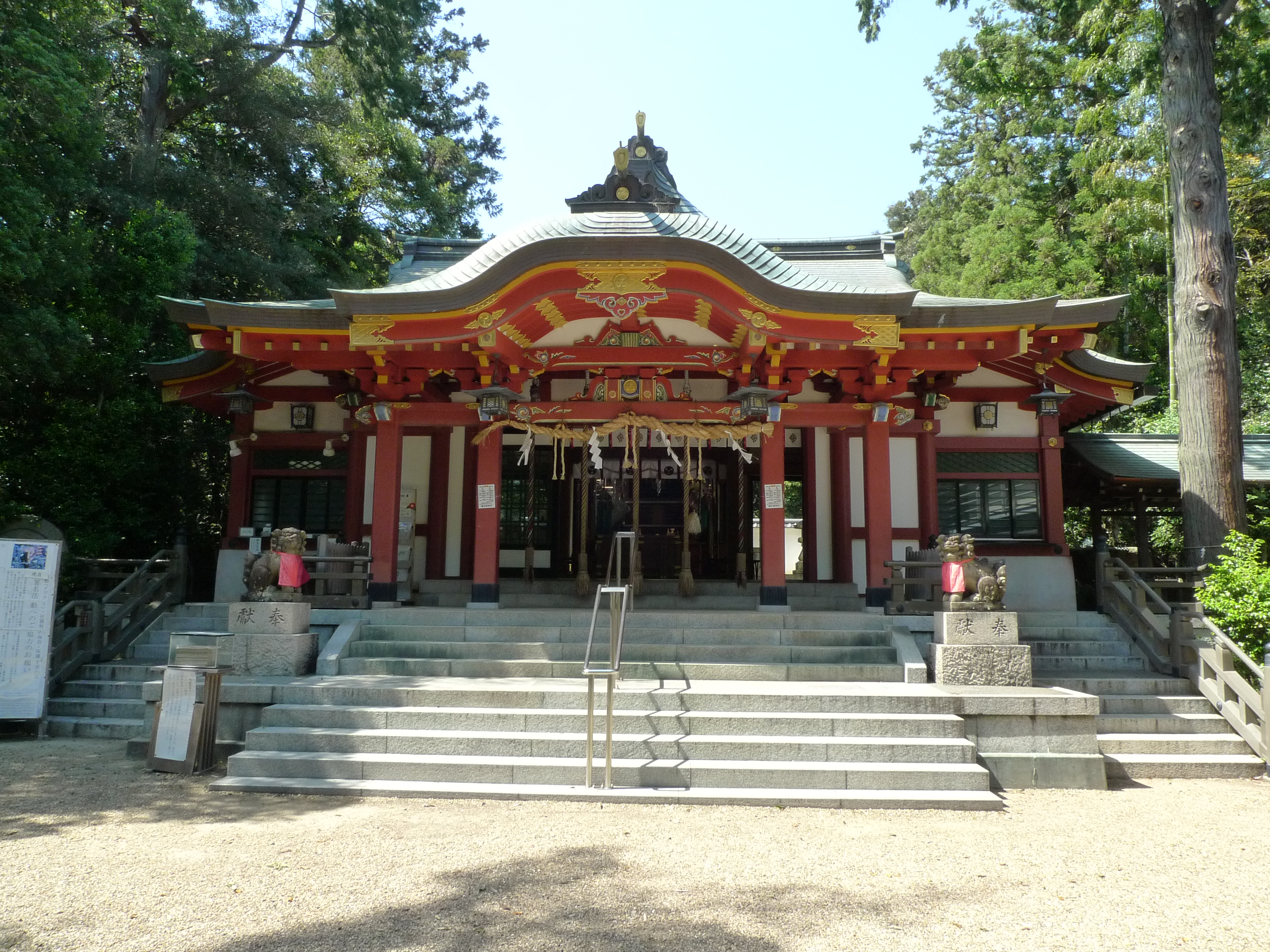
- Koshikiiwa Shrine

- Location within Japan

Religion
- Affiliation: Shinto

Location
- Interactive map of Koshikiiwa Jinja (越木岩神社, Koshikiiwa-jinja)
- Coordinates: 34.7588°N 135.3223°E

Koshikiiwa Jinja (越木岩神社, Koshikiiwa-jinja) is a Shinto shrine in Nishinomiya, Hyōgo, Japan. The other name of this shrine is Ebisu Daijingū. The focus of this shrine is a megalith called 'Koshiki-iwa', literally, 'Rice Steamer Rock', because ancient Japanese thought the shape resembled a traditional rice steamer. The height of the megalith is 10 metres with a circumference of 40 metres. The grounds of this shrine also include an outdoor sumo dohyo and a stage, possibly used for kagura.

== History ==
In the Engishiki, a document about royal ceremony in the Heian Period, Ōkuninonushi-Nishi-Jinja (大国主西神社) is cited; this shrine is believed to be today's Koshikiiwa Jinja.

About 1644, this shrine was re-constructed and, in 1656, Ebisu from Nishinomiya Shrine was enshrined there by the monk Kyōjun (教順). The present inner shrine was built in 1936, and the outer shrine was built in 1983.

== Access ==
- Kurakuenguchi Station of Hankyu Koyoen Line
- Koyoen Station of the Hankyu Koyoen Line
