= Mikage Station (Hankyu) =

Railway station in Kobe, Japan

Coordinates: 34°43′29″N 135°15′09″E

Mikage Station 御影駅
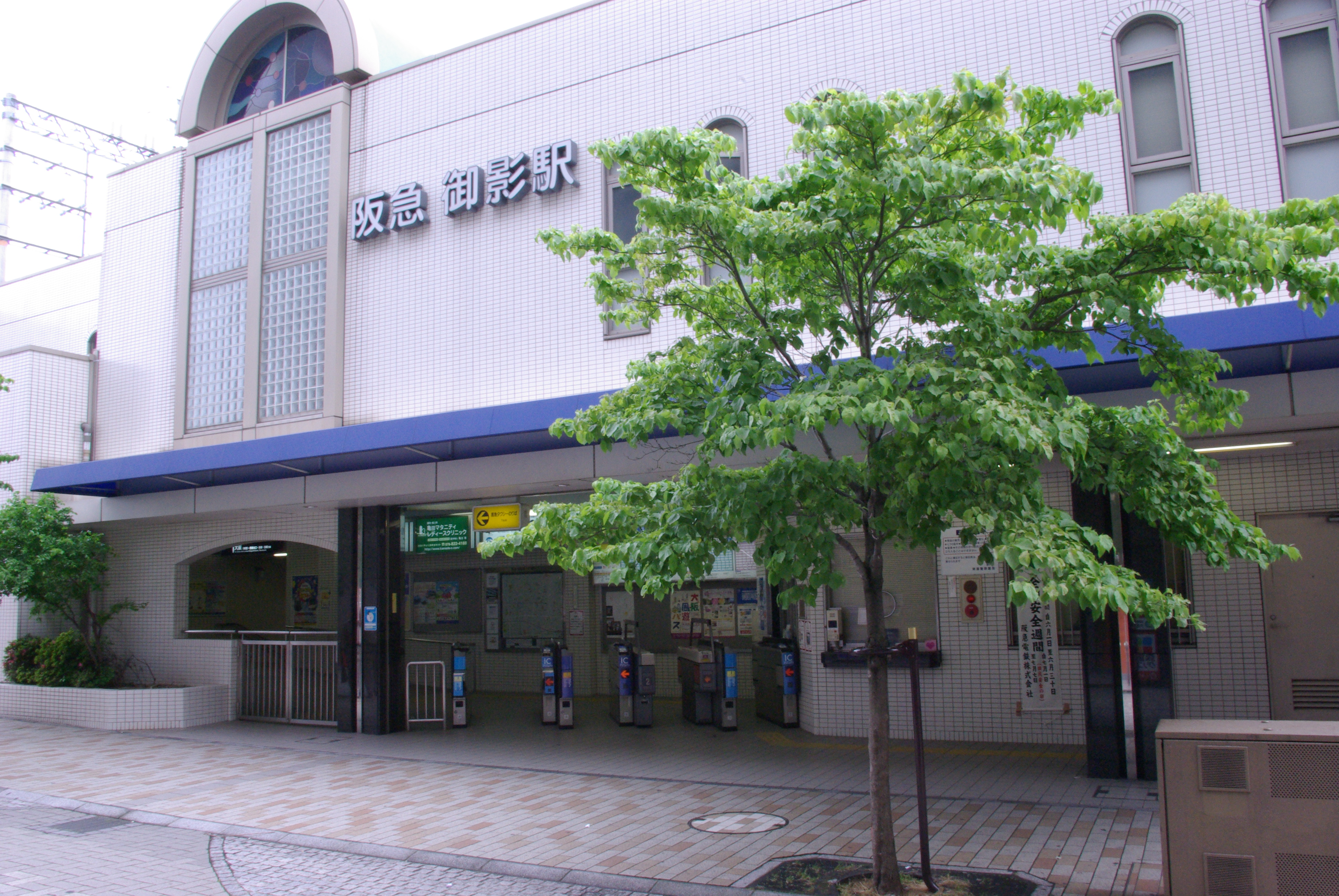
- Mikage Station

General information
- Location: 2-chōme-1 Mikage, Higashinada-ku, Kobe-shi, Hyōgo-ken Hyogo 658-0047; Japan
- Operator: Hankyu Railway.
- Line: ■ Hankyu Kobe Line
- Distance: 25.6 km (15.9 miles) from Osaka-umeda
- Platforms: 2 side platforms

Other information
- Status: Staffed
- Station code: HK-12
- Website: Official website

History
- Opened: 16 July 1920

Passengers
- FY2019: 10,350

Services
Hankyu Railway Kōbe Main Line (HK-12)
Okamoto (HK-11)	Local	Rokko (HK-13)
Okamoto (HK-11)	Commutation Express	Rokko (HK-13)
Okamoto (HK-11)	Express	Rokko (HK-13)
Semi limited Express: Does not stop at this station
Limited Express: Does not stop at this station
Morning Commutation Limited Express: Does not stop at this station
Extra Limited Express (Kosoku Kobe - Arashiyama): Does not stop at this station
Location
- Location within Hyōgo Prefecture Location within Japan

Mikage Station (御影駅, Mikage-eki) is a passenger railway station located in Higashinada-ku, Kobe, Hyōgo Prefecture, Japan. It is operated by the private transportation company Hankyu Railway.

== Lines ==
Mikage Station is served by the Hankyū Kōbe Main Line, and is located 25.6 kilometres (15.9 miles) from the terminus of the line at Osaka-umeda.

== Layout ==
The station has two side platforms serving two tracks. The south ticket gate is underground and connected with each platform by each stairs and each elevator. The north gate is accessible and is directly connected to the east-bound platform. West of the station is a short siding between the two tracks for train up to six cars. From April 7, 1968 to February 14, 1998, trains of Sanyo Electric Railway operated on the Hankyu line between Sannomiya and Rokkō used this siding to change the direction. Presently it is regularly used by out-of-service trains (forwarding of additional cars for peak hours).

=== Platforms ===
1	■ Kobe Line	for Kobe-sannomiya, Shinkaichi and the Sanyo Railway Main Line
2	■ Kobe Line	for Nishinomiya-Kitaguchi, Ōsaka (Umeda), Kyōto and Takarazuka

== History ==
Mikage Station opened on 16 July 1920, simultaneously with the opening of the Kobe Main Line.

The pocket track west of the station was completed in 1968.

The station was damaged by the Great Hanshin earthquake in January 1995. Restoration work on the Kobe Line took 7 months to complete.

Station numbering was introduced on 21 December 2013, with Mikage being designated as station number HK-12.

== Passenger statistics ==
In fiscal 2019, the station was used by an average of 10,350 passengers daily

=== Surrounding area ===
North of the station features the nearby Fukadaike Park, a book shop, and a bakery. There were and are magnificent mansions such as former Kodera house, the one built by the founding family of Takeda Pharmaceutical Company.

- Fukadaike Park（深田池公園）
- Hakutsuru Fine Art Museum（白鶴美術館）
- KOSETSU Museum of Art（香雪美術館）
- Yuzuruha Shrine (5 minutes walk south, 弓弦羽神社)

=== Bus transport ===
In front of the station is a bus that goes to Rokko Island (220 Yen)

Route 19 of Kobe City Bus for Mikage Station (Hanshin) is available from here. (Adults: 210 Yen, Children: 110 Yen)

== See also ==
- List of railway stations in Japan
