= Settsu-Motoyama Station =

Railway station in Kobe, Japan

Settsu-Motoyama Station 摂津本山駅
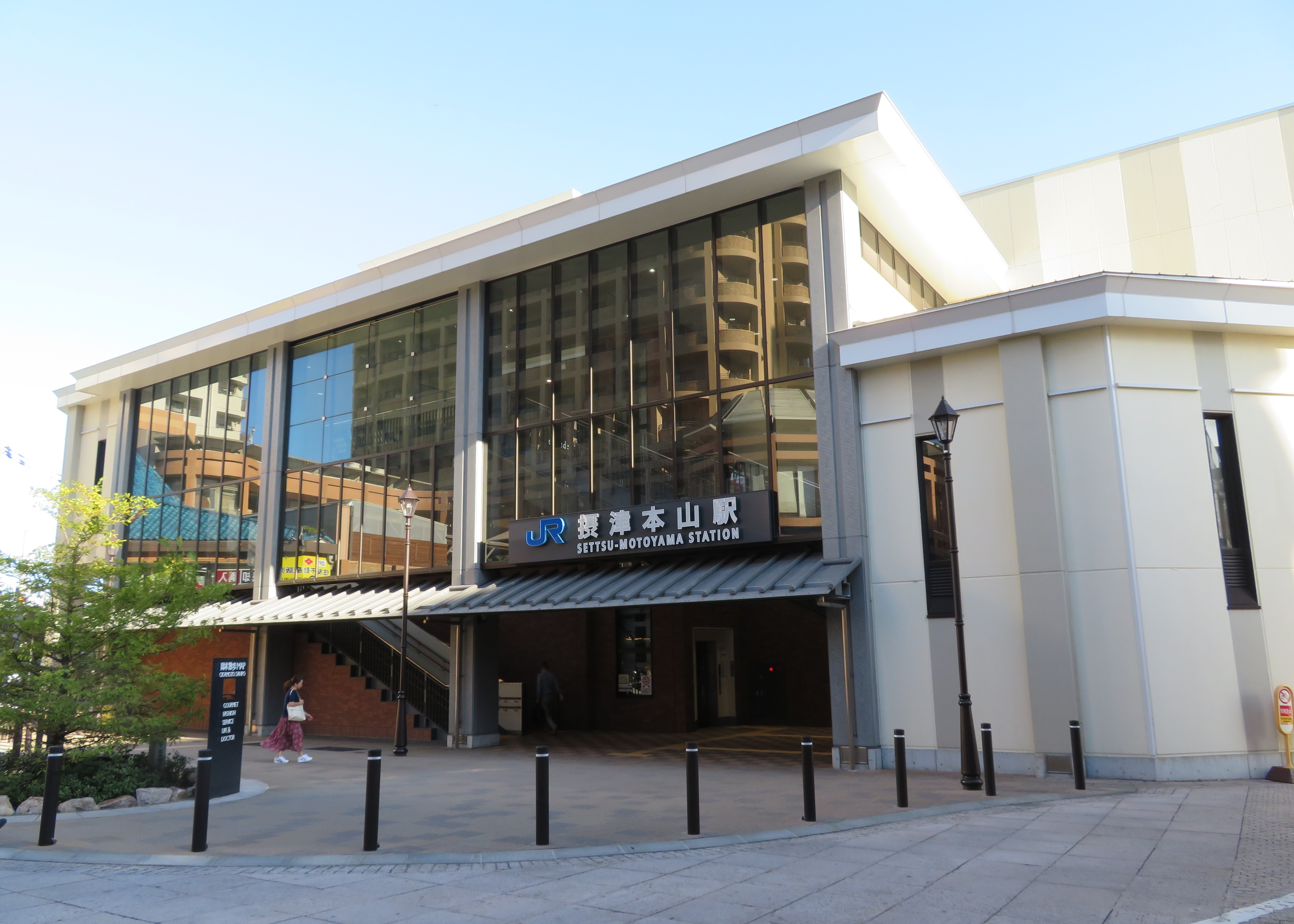
- Settsu-Motoyama Station north entrance, September 2019

General information
- Location: 1-1, Okamoto Itchome, Higashinada-ku, Kobe-shi, Hyōgo-ken 658-0072; Japan
- Coordinates: 34°43′36.05″N 135°16′35.22″E
- Owner: JR West
- Operator: JR West
- Line: Tōkaidō Main Line (JR Kobe Line)
- Distance: 578.5 km (359.5 miles) from Tokyo
- Platforms: 2 island platforms
- Connections: Bus stop

Construction
- Structure type: Ground level
- Accessible: Yes

Other information
- Status: Staffed (Midori no Madoguchi )
- Station code: JR-A56
- Website: Official website

History
- Opened: 25 December 1935

Passengers
- FY 2023: 38,422 daily
Location
- Location within Hyōgo Prefecture Location within Japan

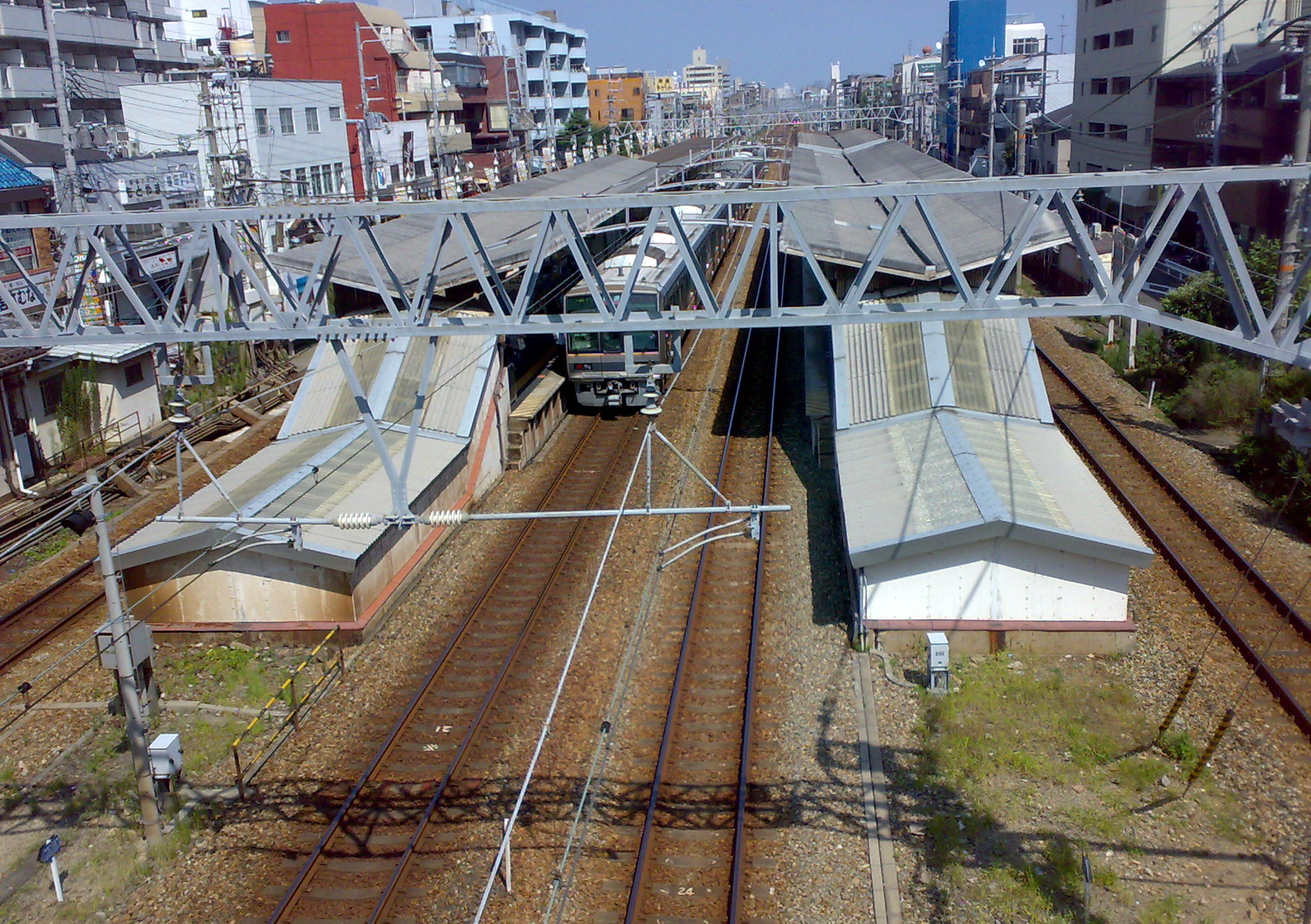
Settsu-Motoyama Station tracks & platforms, September 2009

Settsu-Motoyama Station (摂津本山駅, settsu-motoyama-eki) is a passenger railway station located in Higashinada-ku, Kobe, Hyōgo Prefecture, Japan. It is operated by the West Japan Railway Company (JR West).

== Lines ==
Settsu-Motoyama Station is served by the Tōkaidō Main Line (JR Kobe Line), and is located 578.5 kilometers from the terminus of the line at Tokyo and 22.1 kilometers from Osaka.

== Station layout ==
The station consists of two island platforms connected by an elevated station building; however, only the inner tracks are used, with the outer tracks reserved for passing express trains. The station has a Midori no Madoguchi staffed ticket office.

=== Platforms ===
1	■ JR Kobe Line	for through traffic only
2	■ JR Kobe Line	for Amagasaki, Osaka and Kitashinchi
3	■ JR Kobe Line	for Sannomiya and Himeji
4	■ JR Kobe Line	for through traffic only

== Adjacent stations ==
«	Service	»
JR Kōbe Line (Tōkaidō Main Line)
Kōnan-Yamate (JR-A55)	Local	Sumiyoshi (JR-A57)
Rapid Service: Does not stop at this station
Special Rapid Service: Does not stop at this station

== History ==
Settsu-Motoyama Station opened on 25 December 1935. With the privatization of the Japan National Railways (JNR) on 1 April 1987, the station came under the aegis of the West Japan Railway Company.

Station numbering was introduced to the station in March 2018 with Settsu-Motoyama being assigned station number JR-A56.

== Passenger statistics ==
In fiscal 2019, the station was used by an average of 22,028 passengers daily

== Surrounding area ==
- Konan University
- Okamoto Station (Hyōgo) - 4 minutes walk.
- Kobe Pharmaceutical University
- Okamoto Bairin Park

== See also ==
- List of railway stations in Japan
