= Rokko Yahata Shrine =

Shrine in Nada-ku, Kōbe, Japan

Rokko Yahata Shrine (六甲八幡神社, Rokkō Yahata-jinja)
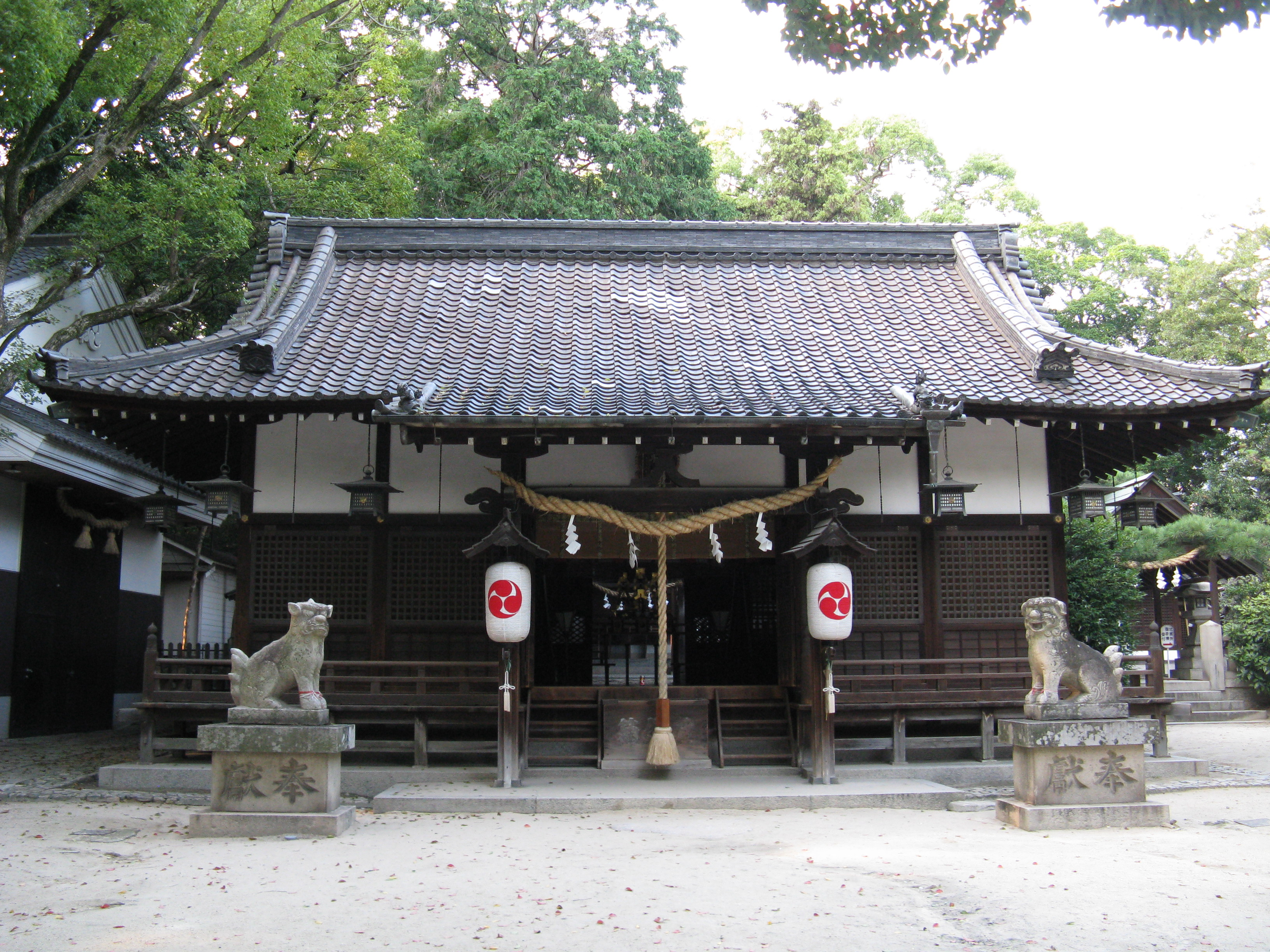
- Haiden, September 2008

- Location within Japan

Religion
- Affiliation: Shinto

Location
- Coordinates: 34.7193°N 135.2350°E

Rokko Yahata Shrine (六甲八幡神社, Rokkō Yahata-jinja) is a Japanese Shinto shrine near Hankyu Rokko Station in Nada-ku, Kobe. It is one of the biggest shrines in western Kobe, alongside Sumiyoshi Shrine. The shrine hosts several events throughout the year, including New Year's Day celebration, the yakujin festival, setsubun and Shichi-Go-San. Notably, the big red torii gate at the entrance to the shopping mall is large and is at least 110 years old.
