= Ashiyagawa Station =

Railway station in Ashiya, Hyōgo Prefecture, Japan

Ashiyagawa Station 芦屋川駅
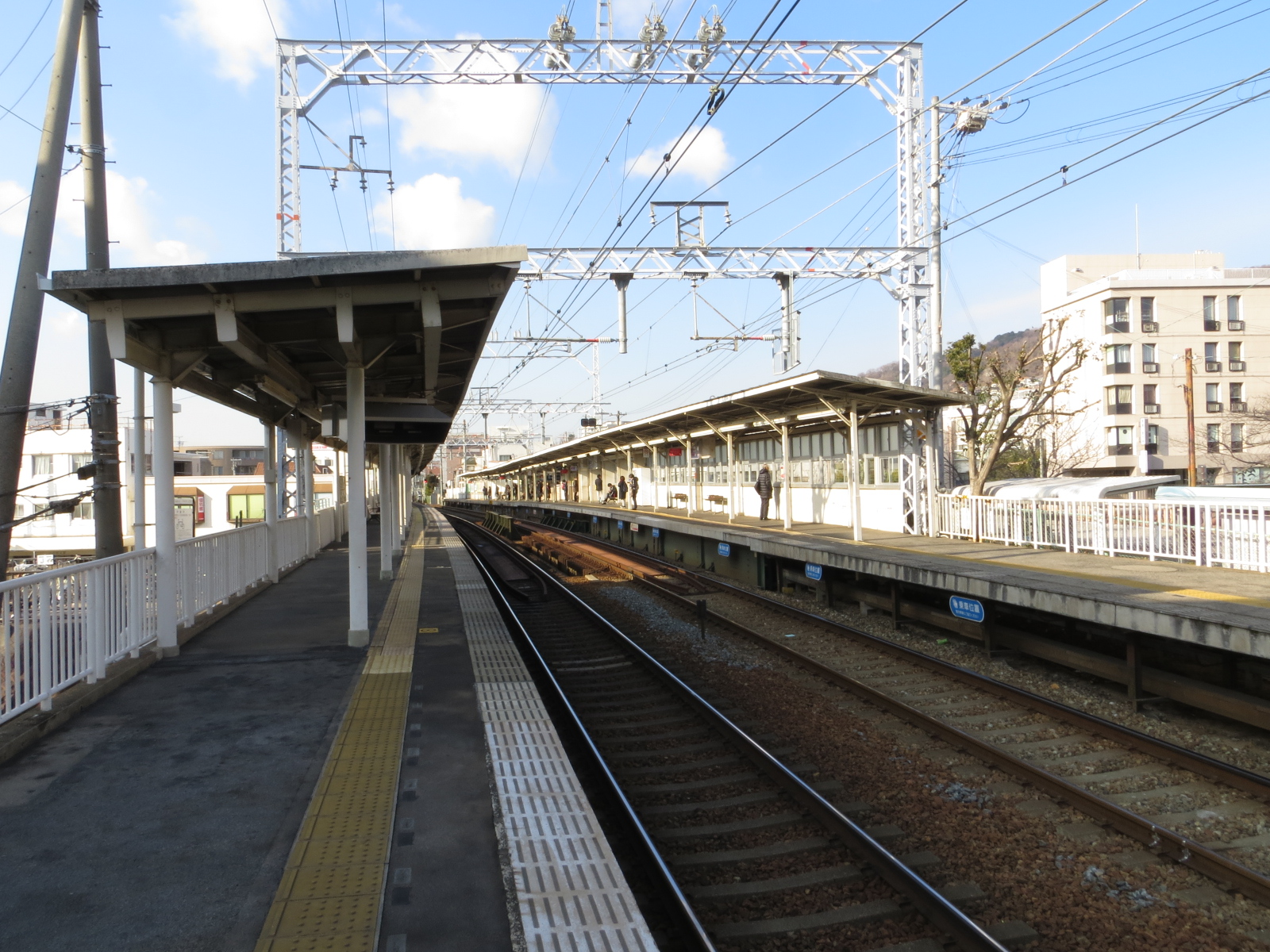
- Ashiyagawa Station platforms

General information
- Location: 1 Nishiyamachō, Ashiya-shi, Hyōgo-ken 659-0083; Japan
- Coordinates: 34.7366°N 135.3005°E
- Operator: Hankyu Railway
- Line: Kōbe Main Line
- Distance: 21.0 km (13.0 miles) from Osaka-umeda
- Platforms: 2 side platforms
- Tracks: 2

Other information
- Status: Staffed
- Station code: HK-10
- Website: Official website

History
- Opened: 16 July 1920

Passengers
- FY2019: 17,805

Services
Preceding station	Hankyu Railway	Following station
Shukugawa HK-09 towards Osaka-umeda	Kōbe Main Line Local Commuter Express Express	Okamoto HK-11 towards Kobe-Sannomiya
Location
- Location within Hyōgo Prefecture Location within Japan

Ashiyagawa Station (芦屋川駅, Ashiyagawa-eki; station number: HK-10) is a passenger railway station located in the city of Ashiya, Hyōgo Prefecture, Japan. It is operated by the private transportation company Hankyu Railway.

== Lines ==
Ashiyagawa Station is served by the Hankyū Kōbe Main Line, and is located 21.0 kilometres (13.0 miles) from the terminus of the line at Osaka-umeda.

== Layout ==
The station consists of two opposed elevated side platforms serving two tracks. The platform straddles the Ashiya River on the east side and the station building is located on the west bank of the Ashiya River.

=== Platforms ===
1	■ Kobe Line	for Kobe-sannomiya, Shinkaichi, and the Sanyo Railway Main Line
2	■ Kobe Line	for Osaka (Umeda), Nishinomiya-Kitaguchi, Kyoto, and Takarazuka

== History ==
Ashiyagawa Station opened on 16 July 1920.

The station building was reconstructed in 1957.

The station was damaged by the Great Hanshin earthquake in January 1995. Restoration work on the Kobe Line took 7 months to complete.

Station numbering was introduced on 21 December 2013, with Ashiyagawa being designated as station number HK-10.

== Passenger statistics ==
In fiscal 2019, the station was used by an average of 17,805 passengers daily

== Surrounding area ==
- Ashiya River (芦屋川)
- Ashiya Rock Garden (芦屋ロックガーデン)
- Ashiya Shrine (芦屋神社)
- Ashiya University (芦屋大学)
- Konan Junior and Senior High School (甲南中学校・高等学校)
- Kōza-no-taki Waterfall (高座の滝)
- Ege-no-yama remains (会下山遺跡)
- TAWARA MUSEUM OF ART (俵美術館)
- TEKISUI MUSEUM OF ART (滴翠美術館)

== See also ==
- List of railway stations in Japan
