= Okamoto Station (Hyōgo) =

Railway station in Kobe, Japan

Okamoto Station 岡本駅
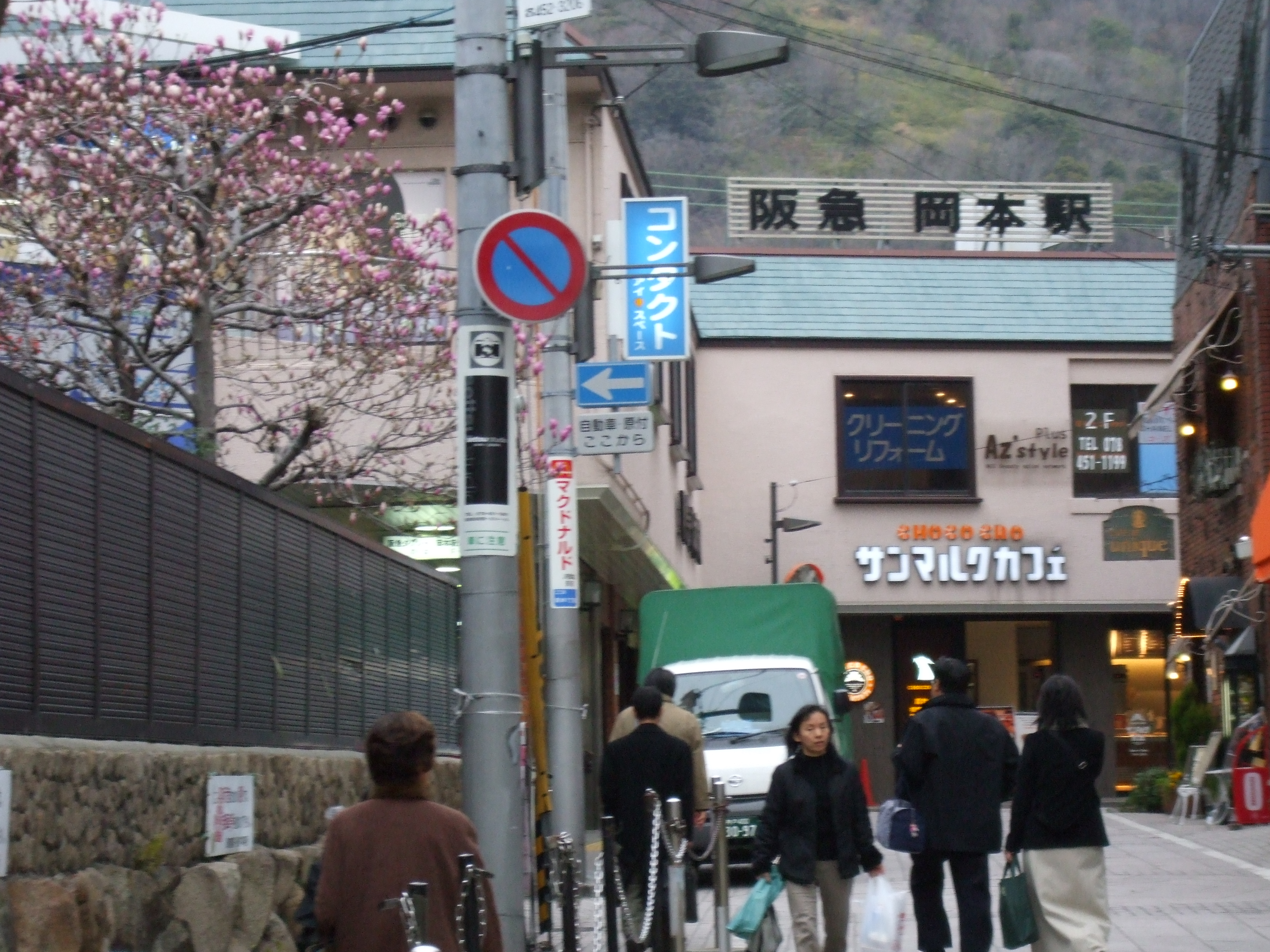

General information
- Location: Okamoto Gochome, Higashinada-ku, Kobe-shi, Hyōgo-ken 658-0072; Japan
- Coordinates: 34°43′44.78″N 135°16′32.63″E
- Operator: Hankyu Railway.
- Line: ■ Hankyu Kobe Line
- Distance: 23.4 km (14.5 miles) from Osaka-umeda
- Platforms: 2 side platforms
- Connections: Bus stop

Other information
- Status: Staffed
- Station code: HK-11
- Website: Official website

History
- Opened: 16 July 1920

Passengers
- FY2019: 28,105

Services
Hankyu Railway Kōbe Main Line (HK 11)
| Ashiyagawa (HK 10) | Local | Mikage (HK 12) |
| Ashiyagawa (HK 10) | Express; Commutation Express | Mikage (HK 12) |
| Shukugawa (HK 09) | Semi limited Express | Rokkō (HK 13) |
| Shukugawa (HK 09) | Limited Express "Atago" (operated during crowded season) | Rokkō (HK 13) |
| Shukugawa (HK 09) | Limited Express; Commutation Limited Express | Kobe-sannomiya (HK 16) |
Location
- Location within Hyōgo Prefecture Location within Japan

Okamoto Station (岡本駅, Okamoto-eki; station number: HK-11) is a passenger railway station located in Higashinada-ku, Kobe, Hyōgo Prefecture, Japan. It is operated by the private transportation company Hankyu Railway.

== Lines ==
Okamoto Station is served by the Hankyū Kōbe Main Line, and is located 23.4 kilometres (14.5 miles) from the terminus of the line at Osaka-umeda.

== Layout ==
The station consists of two opposed side platforms, connected by an underground passage.

=== Platforms ===
| 1 | ■ Kobe Line | for Kobe-sannomiya, Shinkaichi and the Sanyo Railway Main Line |
| 2 | ■ Kobe Line | for Nishinomiya-Kitaguchi, Ōsaka (Umeda), Kyōto and Takarazuka |

== History ==
Okamoto Station opened on 16 July 1920.

The level crossing on the station premises were removed in 1967 while the station building was reconstructed in 1979.

The station was damaged by the Great Hanshin earthquake in January 1995. Restoration work on the Kobe Line took 7 months to complete.

Station numbering was introduced on 21 December 2013, with Okamoto being designated as station number HK-11.

== Passenger statistics ==
In fiscal 2019, the station was used by an average of 28,105 passengers daily

=== Surrounding area ===
- Settsu-Motoyama Station (JR Kōbe Line)
- Konan University (甲南大学)
- Konan Women's University (甲南女子大学)
- Konan Girls' Junior and Senior High School (甲南女子中学校・高等学校)
- Kobe Pharmaceutical University (神戸薬科大学)
- Yamate Road (山手幹線)
- Okamoto Bairin Park (岡本梅林公園)

In the area around Okamoto Station, there are two famous 'Bairin', spots to see plum flowers in early spring. Those are Okamoto Bairin and Hokura Bairin.

=== Buses ===
Kobe City Bus

- Route 30 for Hanshin Fukae, Higashinada Senior High School, and Fukae-Hamamachi
- Route 31 for JR Konan-Yamate / for Uzumoridai
- Route 33 for JR Konan-Yamate / for Hanshin Mikage Minamiguchi
- Route 34 for JR Konan-Yamate / for Uozaki-Hamamachi

Kobe Minato Kanko

- Route 11 directly to Rokko Island
- Route 12 for Hanshin Mikage and Rokko Island / for Shukugawa Green Town (Hankyu Shukugawa Station)

== See also ==
- List of railway stations in Japan
