= Yongdap station =

Station of the Seoul Metropolitan Subway

| 용답; Yongdap |
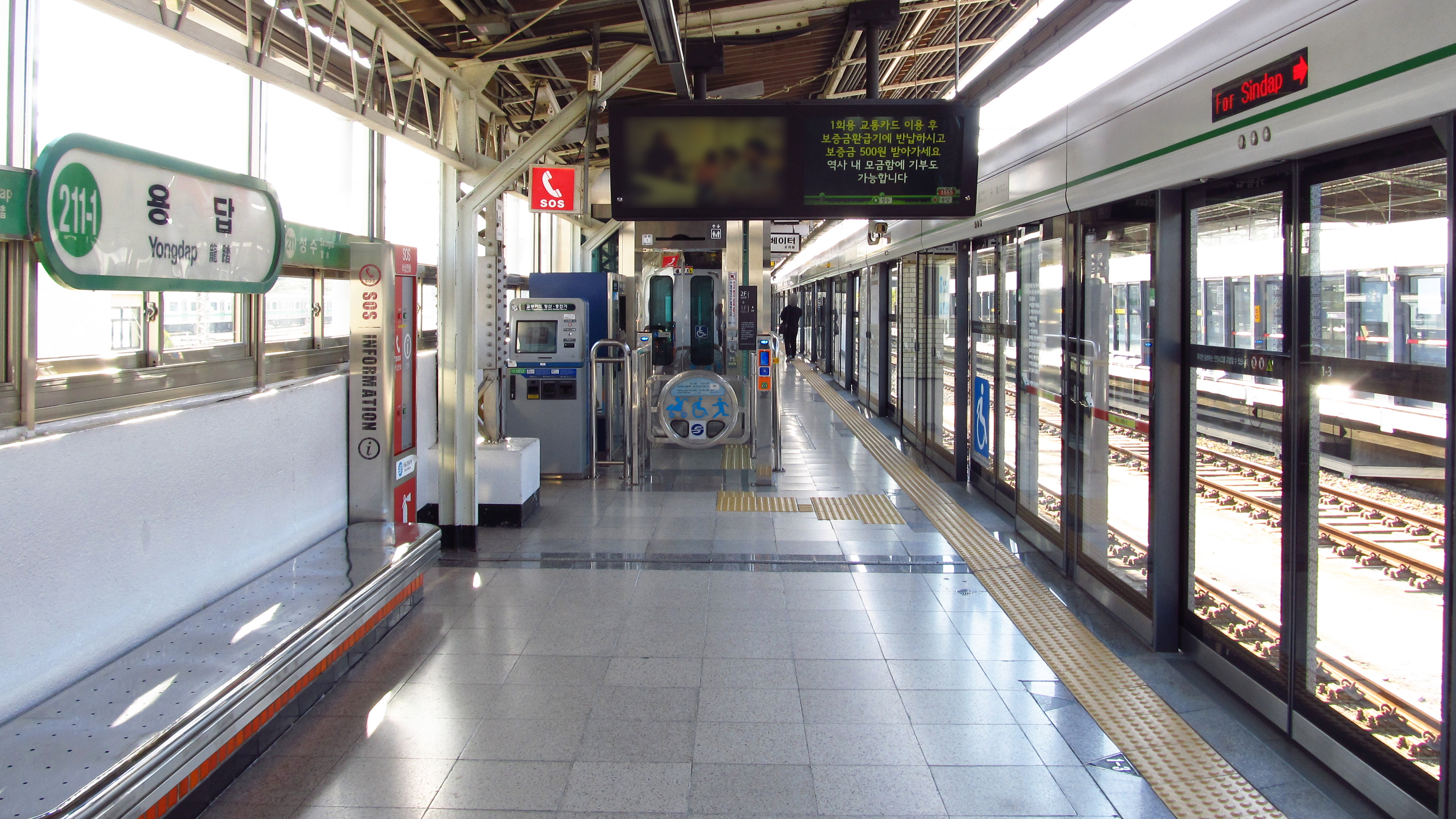
- Station Platform

Korean name
- Hangul: 용답역
- Hanja: 龍踏驛
- RR: Yongdap-yeok
- MR: Yongdap-yŏk

General information
- Location: 86 Yongdapgil, 127 Yongdap-dong, Seongdong-gu, Seoul
- Coordinates: 37.56188°N 127.0509°E
- Operator: Seoul Metro
- Line: Line 2
- Platforms: 2
- Tracks: 2

Construction
- Structure type: Aboveground

History
- Opened: October 31, 1980

Passengers
- (Daily) Based on Jan-Dec of 2012. Line 2: 5,340

Services
| Preceding station | Seoul Metropolitan Subway | Following station |
|---|---|---|
| Seongsu Terminus | Line 2 Seongsu Branch | Sindap towards Sinseol-dong |
Location

Yongdap Station is a station on the Seongsu Branch of the Seoul Subway Line 2. It is located in Yongdap-dong, Seongdong-gu, Seoul.

== Vicinity ==
- Exit 1 : Sageun Elementary School
- Exit 2 : Gunja Train Depot
