= Kobe Shoin Women's University =

All-women's private university in Nada Ward of Kobe, Japan

Coordinates: 34°43′38.4″N 135°13′46.5″E

- 神戸松蔭女子学院大学
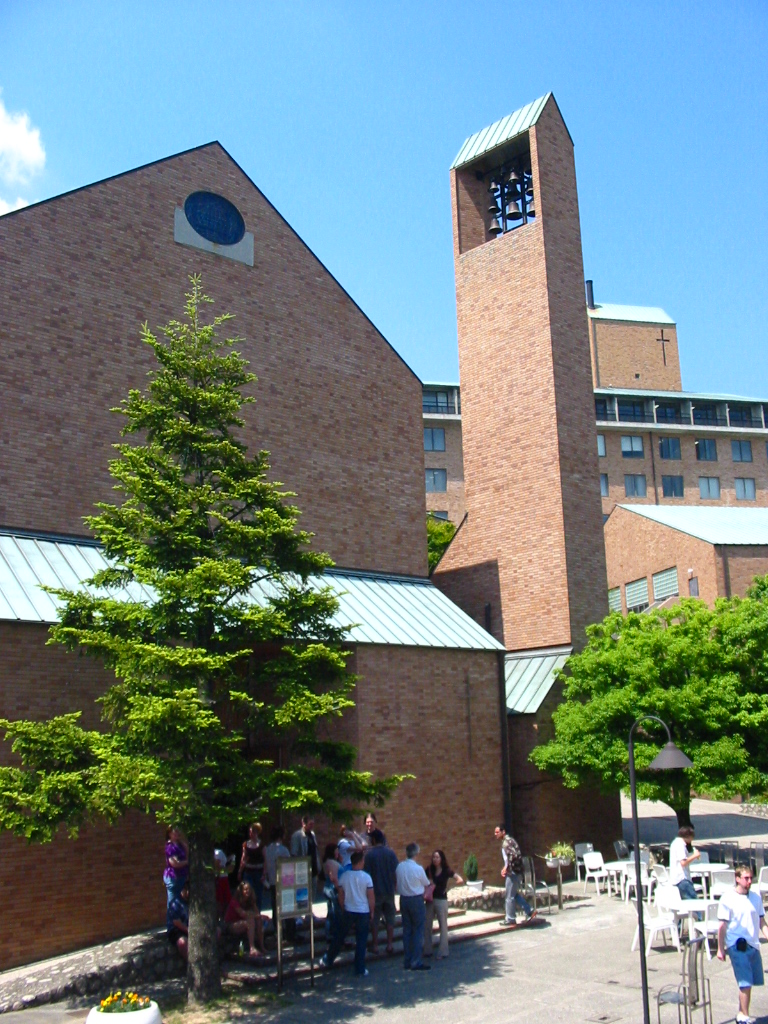
- Type: Private
- Established: 1892
- Location: Nada Ward, Hyōgo, Japan
- Website: www.shoin.ac.jp

Kobe Shoin Women's University (神戸松蔭女子学院大学, Kōbe Shōin Joshi Gakuin Daigaku) is an all-women's private university in Nada Ward of Kobe, in western Japan. It was founded by visiting missionaries in 1892. It is a four-year university offering courses across multiple faculties, with an annual enrollment of about 2,500 students. Additionally, the university has a graduate school offering graduate qualifications at Masters and Doctoral level in psychology and linguistics.

== Campus ==
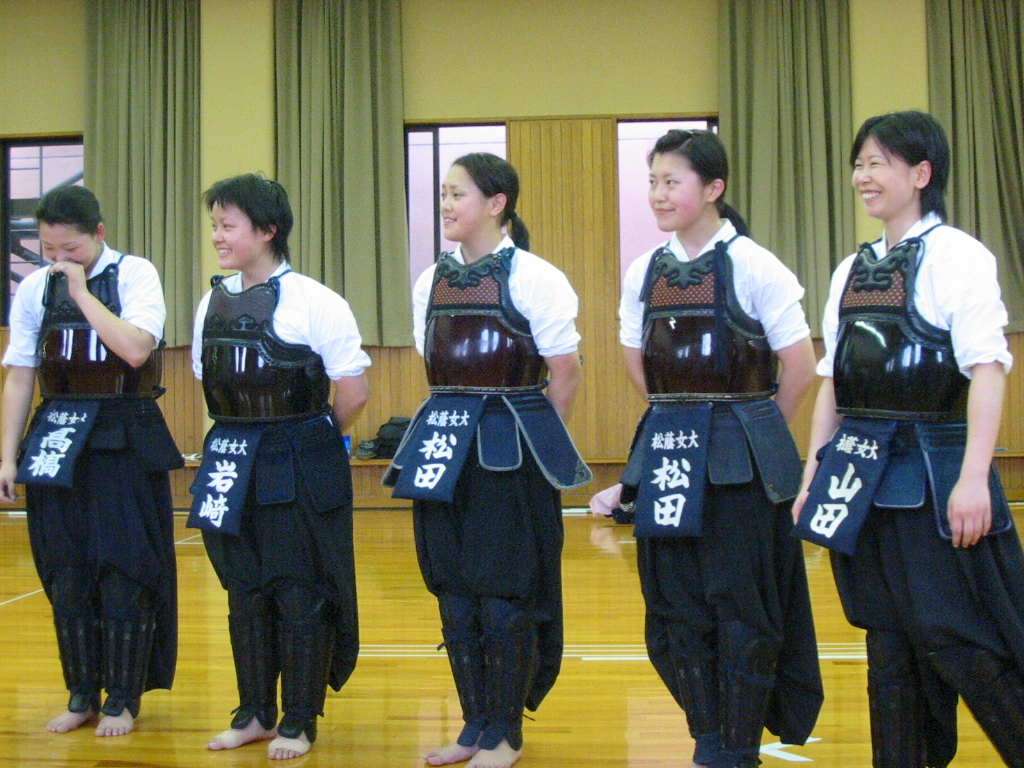
Students at Kobe Shoin Women's University wearing modern armor for naginata sparring, minus helmet.

The university's main campus is in the northeast part of Kobe, near Hankyu Rokko station, at the foot of Mount Rokkō.

The university features outdoor tennis courts and a historic chapel equipped with a pipe organ imported from France in 1983. Open access "English Island" is a key language feature, where students can practice their English skills with 'native speaking' language staff, at any time throughout the day, outside regular class time. A separate building (to the south, near JR's Rokkōmichi Station), known in English as the Japan Study Center and in Japanese as the Conference Center (会館; kaikan), hosts meetings, foreign students, and a small English-language library on separate floors.

== Departments ==
There are two overarching faculties, each containing multiple departments.

The Faculty of Liberal Arts comprises the following departments: English Department (English Professional Studies and Global Communications programs); Department of Japanese Language and Culture (Modern Japanese Language and Japanese Culture programs); and the Department of Liberal Arts.

The Faculty of Human Science consists of the Psychology Department; Department of Lifestyle Studies (Urban Life Studies and Nutrition courses); Department of Child Development; and Department of Fashion and Housing Design.

The Graduate school offers research degree courses, leading to the qualification of doctorate, in the areas of language and linguistics, and psychology. Specifically, there is the Linguistics Science, English Linguistics, Japanese Language and Literature, and Psychology programs.

== Study abroad programs ==
The university maintains study abroad relationships with the following institutions:

- Beijing Foreign Studies University, China
- University of Adelaide, Australia
- University of Auckland, New Zealand
- University of Chichester, United Kingdom
- University of Delaware, United States
- York St John University, United Kingdom
- University of Victoria, Canada

Unlike members of its own matriculated student body, foreign students studying in programs hosted by Kobe Shoin Women's University may be male or female and are housed off-campus in a dormitory near the university which is used by domestic and visiting students. Visiting students may choose to stay for a whole academic year (two semesters) or half year (one semester). Additionally, the university welcomes students in summer programs.

== Employment rate ==
For students graduating in AY2015, 100% found full-time employment.

== Access ==
The university is approximately one kilometre north of Rokkō Station on Hankyu Railway's Kobe Line, which connects Osaka and Kobe. Regular buses go to the university from Rokko station. Alternatively, it is a short walk uphill.

== Other Images ==
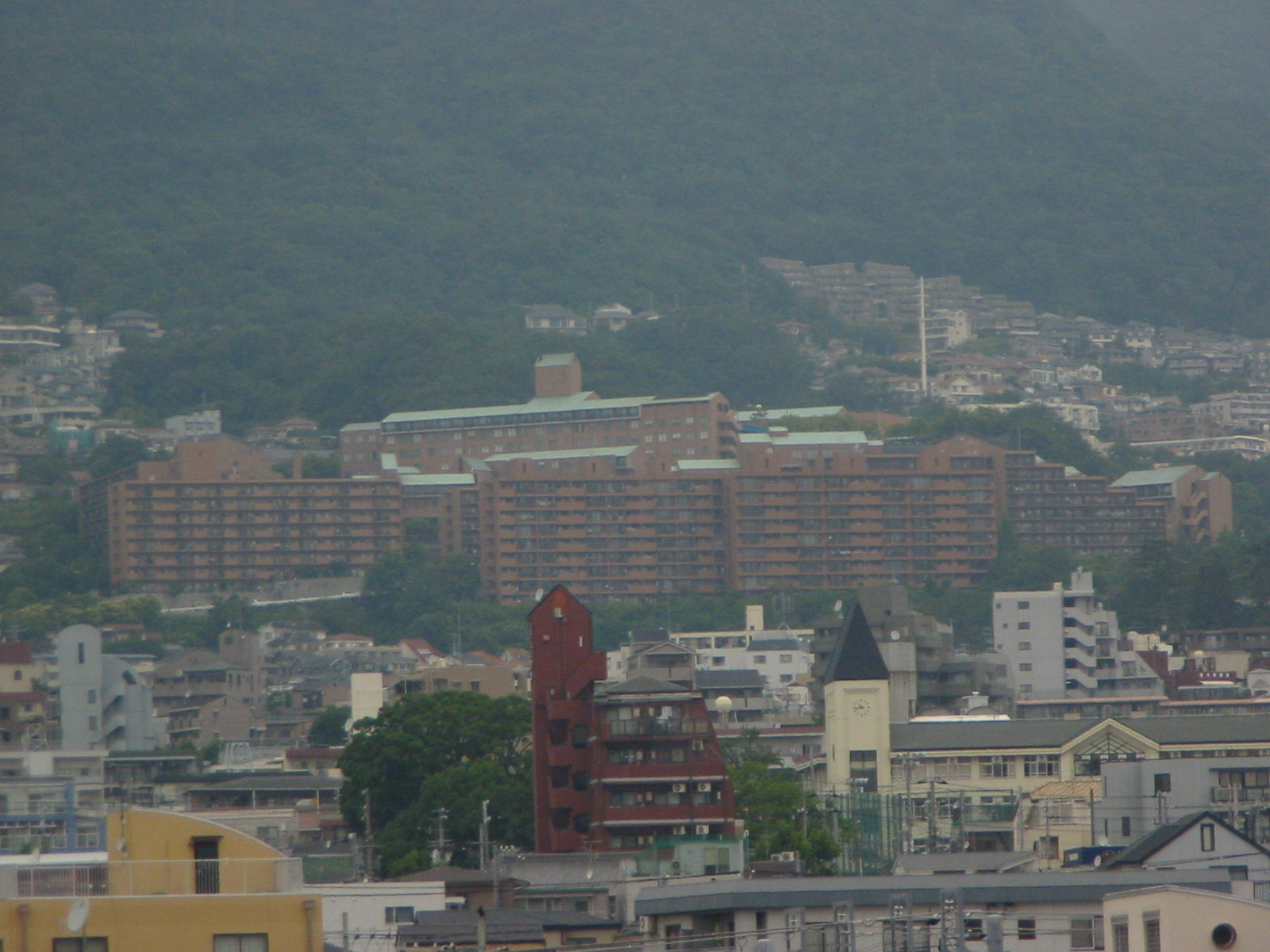
Main campus, seen from the Japan Study Center
