= Nishinomiya Shrine =

Shinto shrine in Hyōgo Prefecture, Japan

Nishinomiya Shrine (西宮神社)
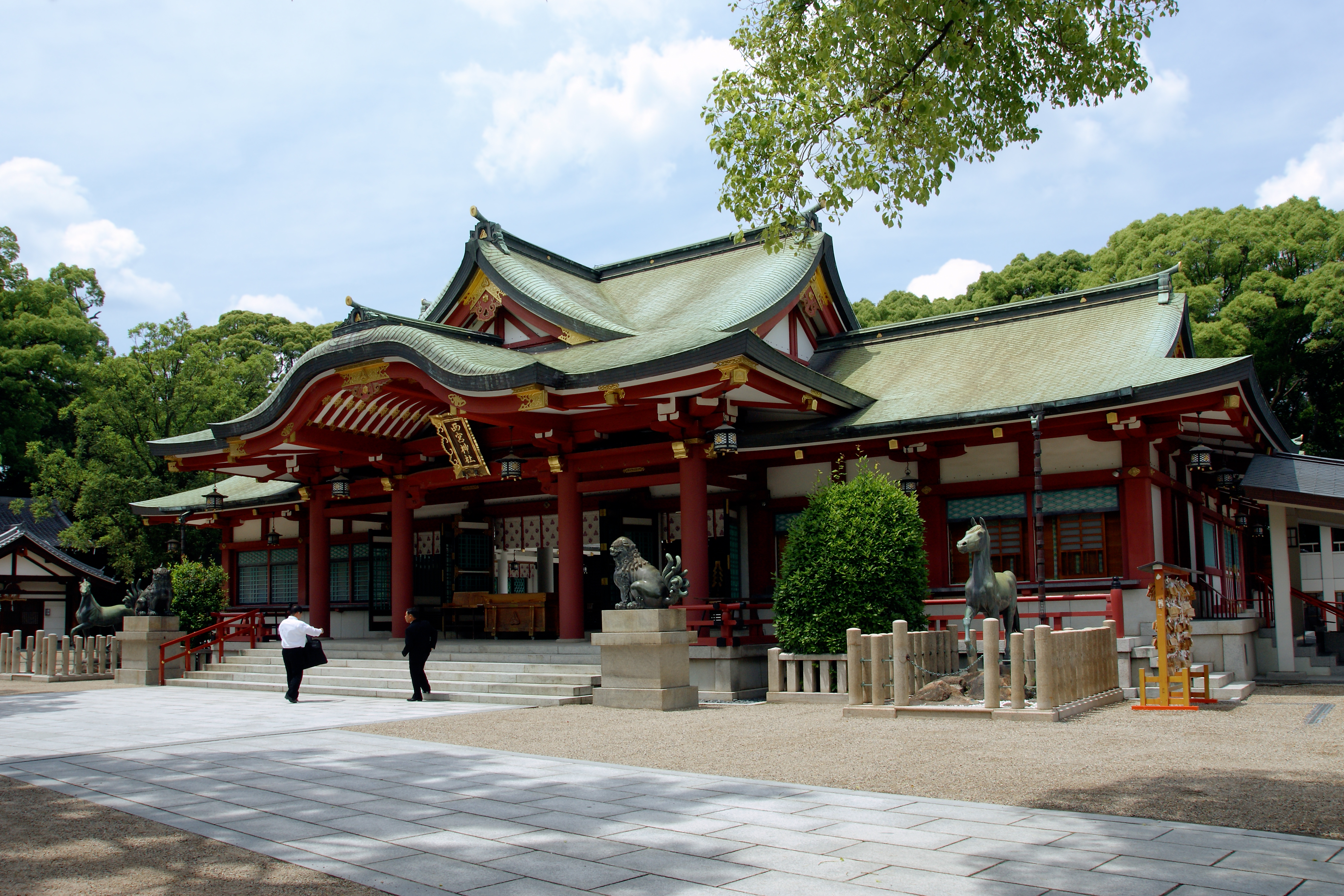
- Haiden

- Location within Japan

Religion
- Affiliation: Shinto

Location
- Interactive map of Nishinomiya Shrine (西宮神社)
- Coordinates: 34°44′8.62″N 135°20′4.48″E

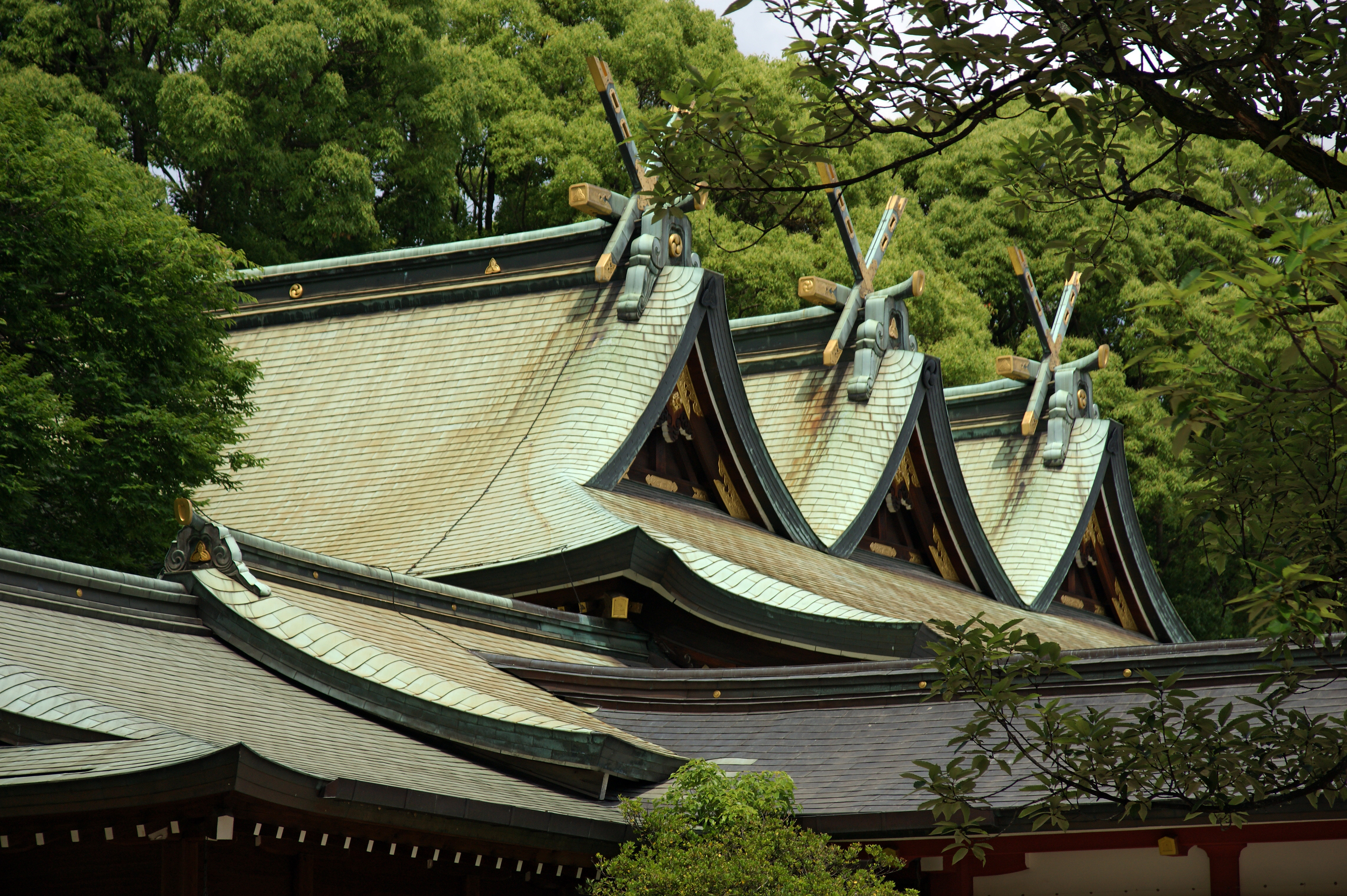
Honden main hall

Nishinomiya Shrine (西宮神社, Nishinomiya jinja) is a Shinto shrine in Nishinomiya, Hyōgo, Japan. It is the head shrine of the Ebisu sect of Shinto, and it is said that there are about 3,500 shrines under it. Locals call the shrine "Ebessan".

== History ==
It is not clear when this shrine was established. However, it is recorded that it was already on this site, under the name Ebisu-sha, and attracting many worshipers during the Heian period. For many centuries it was known as Nangu-sha, the "Southern Shrine", in reference to its status as a branch shrine of Hirota Shrine, which is located to its north in Nishinomiya. Nishinomiya Shrine itself had a similar relationship with Koshikiiwa Shrine, which was sometimes called Kita no Ebisu, meaning the Northern Ebisu.

== Objects of worship ==
Nishinomiya Shrine has three small inner shrines and each shrine covers one or two kami. The first inner shrine covers Nishinomiya-Ōkami, or Ebisu-no-mikoto, namely Ebisu. The kami of the second shrine are Amaterasu-Ōmikami and Ōkuninushino-Mikoto. The kami of third shrine is Susanoo-no-Mikoto.

It is famous for the Tōka-Ebisu festival, which is held on January 10 every year. Particular to this festival is the "Lucky Men" race. Begun during the Edo period, participants gather in front of the shrine's main gate before 6 am on 10 January. At 6 am, the shrine's drum sounds, the gates are opened, and the assembled crowd sprints perilously 230 meters to the main hall. The top three finishers are given the title of "Lucky Men", and of those three the champion is known as the "Luckiest Man". The race has been known to attract more than 6,000 runners.

== Access ==
- Nishinomiya Station of Hanshin Main Line
- Nishinomiya Station of JR Kobe Line
