= Sindap station =

Train station in South Korea

Coordinates: 37.57001°N 127.04652°E

신답; Sindap
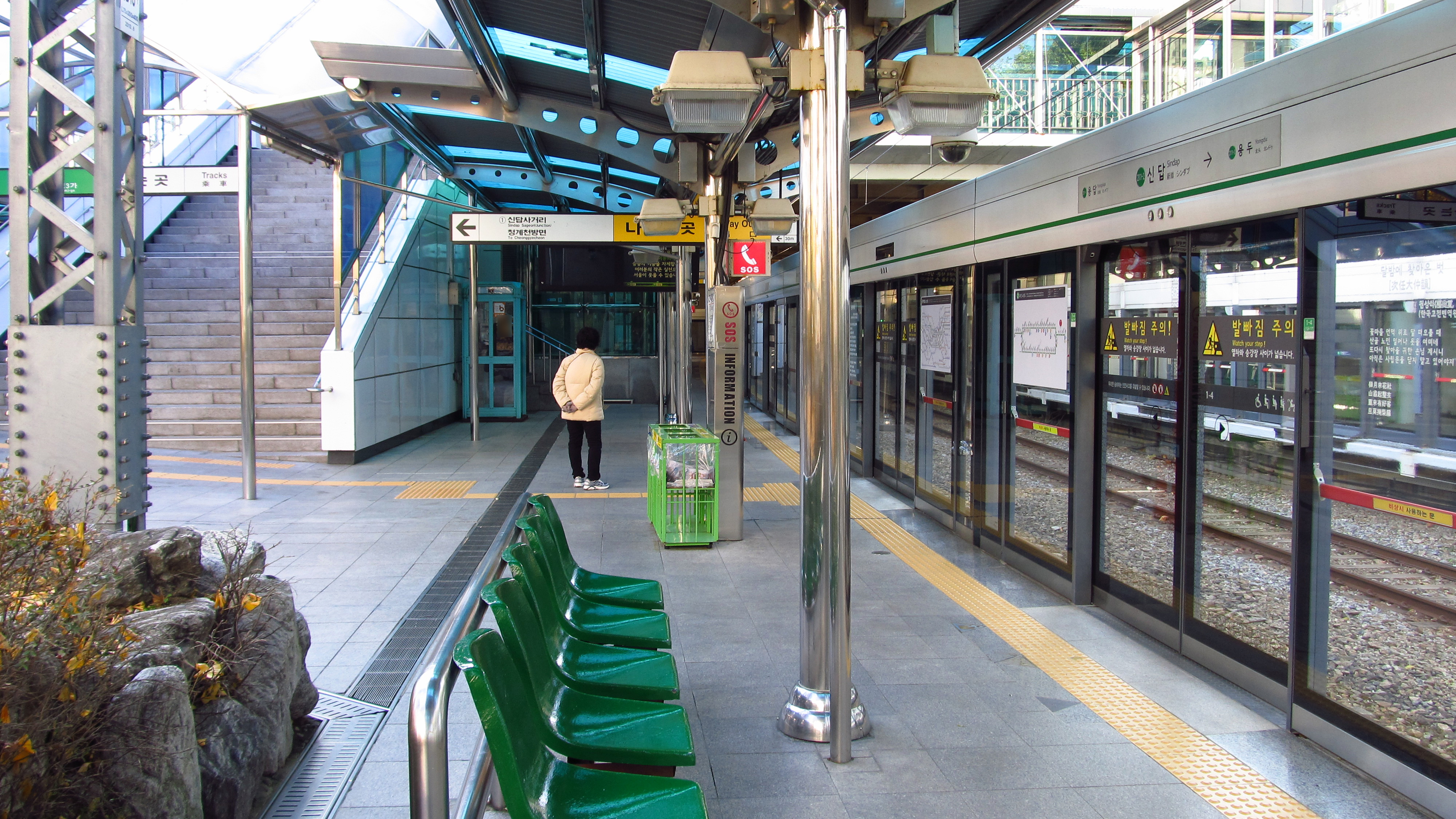
- Station Platform

Korean name
- Hangul: 신답역
- Hanja: 新踏驛
- Revised Romanization: Sindap-yeok
- McCune–Reischauer: Sindap-yŏk

General information
- Location: 128 Yongdap-dong, Cheonhodaero 232, Seongdong-gu, Seoul
- Operated by: Seoul Metro
- Line: Line 2
- Platforms: 2
- Tracks: 2

Construction
- Structure type: Aboveground

History
- Opened: October 30, 1980

Passengers
- (Daily) Based on Jan-Dec of 2012. Line 2: 3,151

Services
Preceding station	Seoul Metropolitan Subway	Following station
Yongdap towards Seongsu	Line 2 Seongsu Branch	Yongdu towards Sinseol-dong
Location

Sindap Station is a station on the Seongsu Branch of the Seoul Subway Line 2. It is located in Yongdap-dong, Seongdong-gu, Seoul.

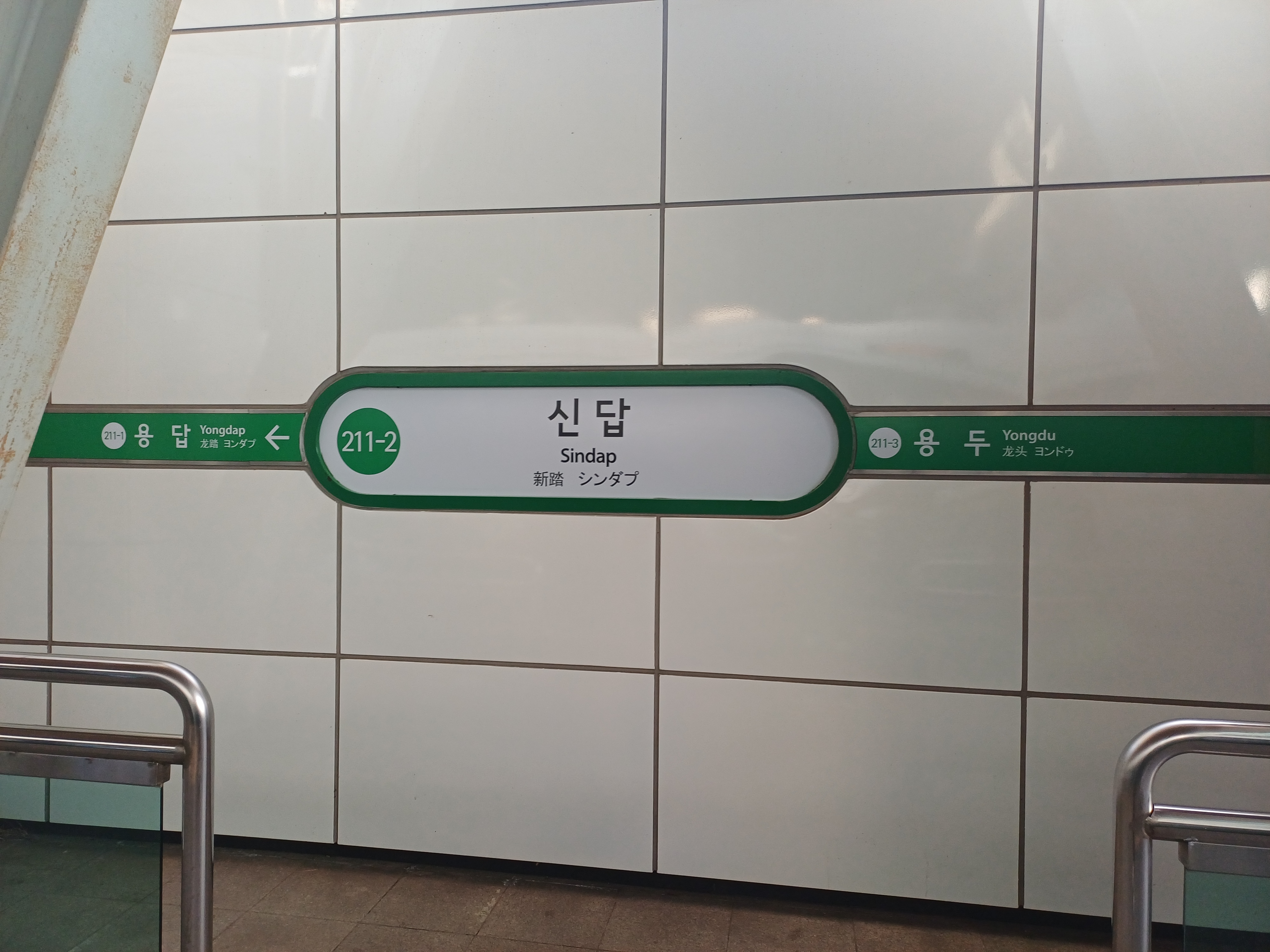
