= Rokkō Station =

Railway station in Kobe, Japan

Coordinates: 34°43′11.42″N 135°14′3.80″E

Rokkō Station 六甲駅
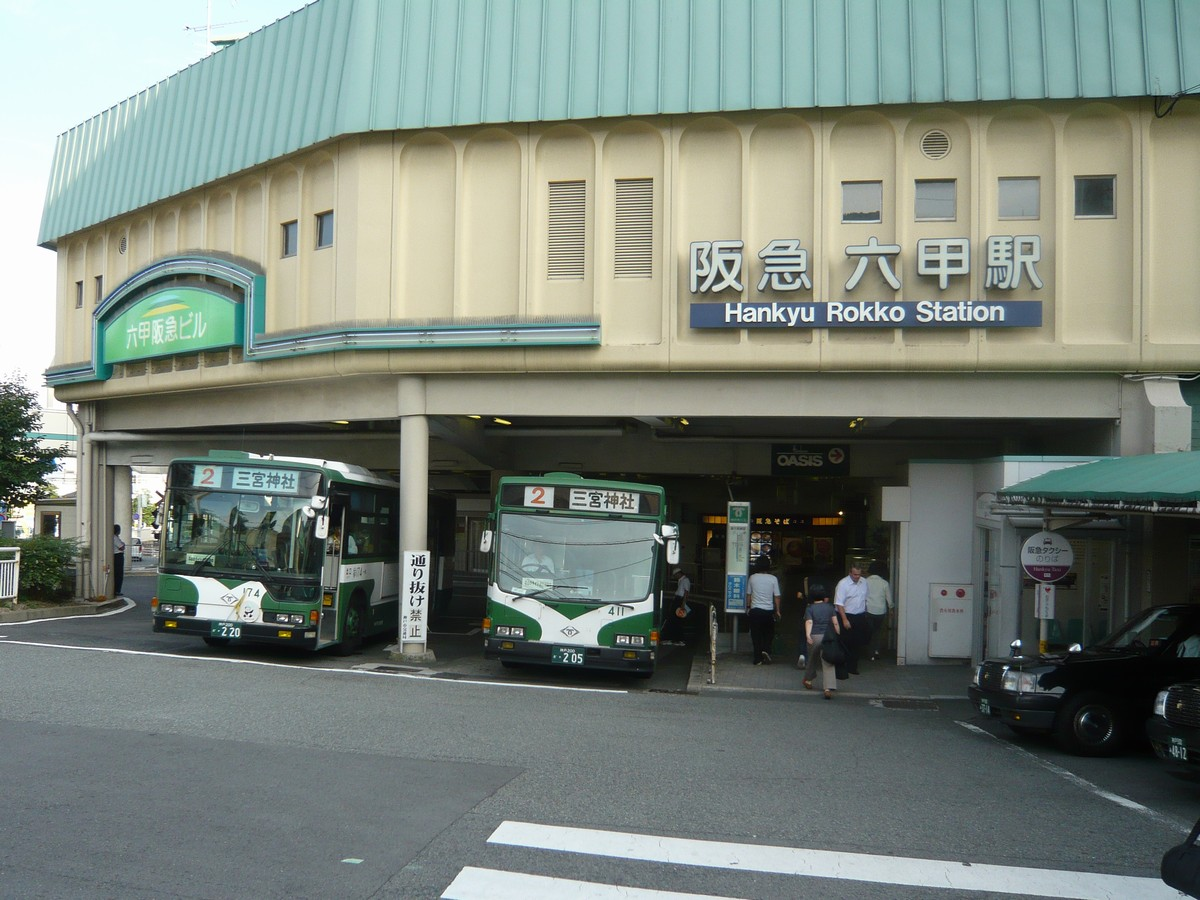
- Station building incorporating bus platforms

General information
- Location: Miyayamacho Sanchome, Nada, Kobe, Hyōgo （神戸市灘区宮山町三丁目） Japan
- Operator: Hankyu Corporation
- Line: Kobe Main Line
- Connections: Bus terminal

Other information
- Station code: HK-13

History
- Opened: 16 July 1920

Passengers
- 6,977,000

Services
Hankyu Railway Kōbe Main Line (HK-13)
| Mikage (HK-12) | Local | Ōji-kōen (HK-14) |
| Mikage (HK-12) | Express; Commutation Express | Ōji-kōen (HK-14) |
| Okamoto (HK-11) | Semi limited Express | Kobe-Sannomiya (HK-16) |
| Okamoto (HK-11) | Rapid Limited Express "Atago" (Kosoku-Kobe - Arashiyama) (operated during crowded season) | Kobe-Sannomiya (HK-16) |
Morning Commutation Limited Express: Does not stop at this station
Limited Express: Does not stop at this station
Location

Rokkō Station (六甲駅, Rokkō-eki; station number: HK-13) is a railway station in Nada-ku, Kobe, Hyōgo Prefecture, Japan, on the Hankyu Railway Kobe Line operated by Hankyu Railway.

== Overview ==
=== Layout ===
Rokko Station is the only station operated by Hankyu Corporation having two side platforms serving a siding track each outside of the passing tracks. When the station was opened in 1920, it had two island platforms serving two tracks each on the ground. The island platforms were removed and the side ones were situated outside of the siding tracks by 1968 for the preparation of the through operation with the Sanyo Railway Main Line and the eight-car operation on the Kobe Line.

The through operation by Sanyo Railway was continued until February 1998 with starting and terminating this station and the trains returned at the siding track in the west of adjacent Mikage Station as deadhead trains.

| 1 | ■ Kobe Line | for Kobe-sannomiya, Shinkaichi and Sanyo Electric Railway |
| 4 | ■ Kobe Line | for Nishinomiya-Kitaguchi, Osaka (Umeda), Kyoto and Takarazuka |

=== Surrounding area ===
Rokko Station is located near Kobe University and Kobe Shoin University. The Hankyu Bus leaves from the station for Mount Rokkō, and city bus services connect with the Rokko Cable Line, Sannomiya and Rokkomichi stations on the JR Kobe Line and Mikage Station on the Hanshin Electric Railway Main Line.

Immediately south of the station is the Rokko Yahata Shrine, which has been in the area for the past century.

== History ==
Rokkō Station opened on 16 July 1920.

Through services from here onto the Sanyo Electric Railway Main Line started running in 1968 and operated until 1998 when these services were discontinued.

The station was damaged by the Great Hanshin earthquake in January 1995. Restoration work on the Kobe Line took 7 months to complete.

Station numbering was introduced on 21 December 2013, with Rokkō being designated as station number HK-13.
