= Kōroen Station =

Railway station in Nishinomiya, Hyōgo Prefecture, Japan

Kōroen Station 香櫨園駅
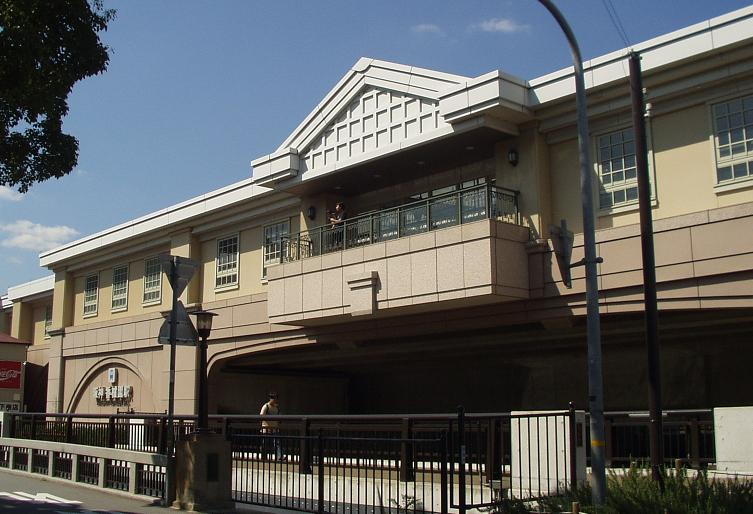
- Kōroen Station

General information
- Location: Matsushita-chō, Nishinomiya-shi, Hyōgo-ken 662-0962; Japan
- Coordinates: 34°44′4″N 135°19′44.98″E
- Operator: Hanshin Electric Railway
- Line: ■ Hanshin Main Line
- Distance: 17.8 km (11.1 miles) from Umeda
- Platforms: 2 side platforms
- Tracks: 2
- Connections: Bus stop

Other information
- Station code: HS 18
- Website: Official website

History
- Opened: April 12, 1907
- Former names: Kōroen (香枦園) (until 2001)

Passengers
- 2019: 11,201 (daily)

Services
Hanshin Main Line (HS 18)
Nishinomiya (HS 17)	Local	Uchide (HS 19)
Morning Express (Osaka-Umeda-bound trains only on weekdays): Does not stop at this station
Express (1 Mikage-bound train only on weekdays): Does not stop at this station
Rapid Express: Does not stop at this station
Imazu (HS 16)	Morning Limited Express (Osaka-Umeda-bound trains only on weekdays)	Uchide (HS 19)
Limited Express: Does not stop at this station
Direct Limited Express: Does not stop at this station
Location
- Location within Hyōgo Prefecture Location within Japan

Kōroen Station (香櫨園駅, Kōroen-ek; station number: HS-18) is a passenger railway station located in the city of Nishinomiya Hyōgo Prefecture, Japan. It is operated by the private transportation company Hanshin Electric Railway.

== Lines ==
Kōroen Station is served by the Hanshin Main Line, and is located 17.8 kilometers from the terminus of the line at Umeda.

== Layout ==
The station consists of two opposed elevated side platforms. There is only one ticket gate on the 1st floor, and the platforms are on the 2nd floor. The station building and platform have been decorated in a retro style reminiscent of the Meiji period, taking into consideration the voices of local residents who wanted the original station building to be preserved. The platform straddles the Shukugawa River.

=== Platforms ===
1	■ ■Main Line	for Koshien, Amagasaki, Osaka (Umeda), Namba, and Nara
2	■ Main Line	for Kobe (Sannomiya), Akashi, and Himeji

== Gallery ==
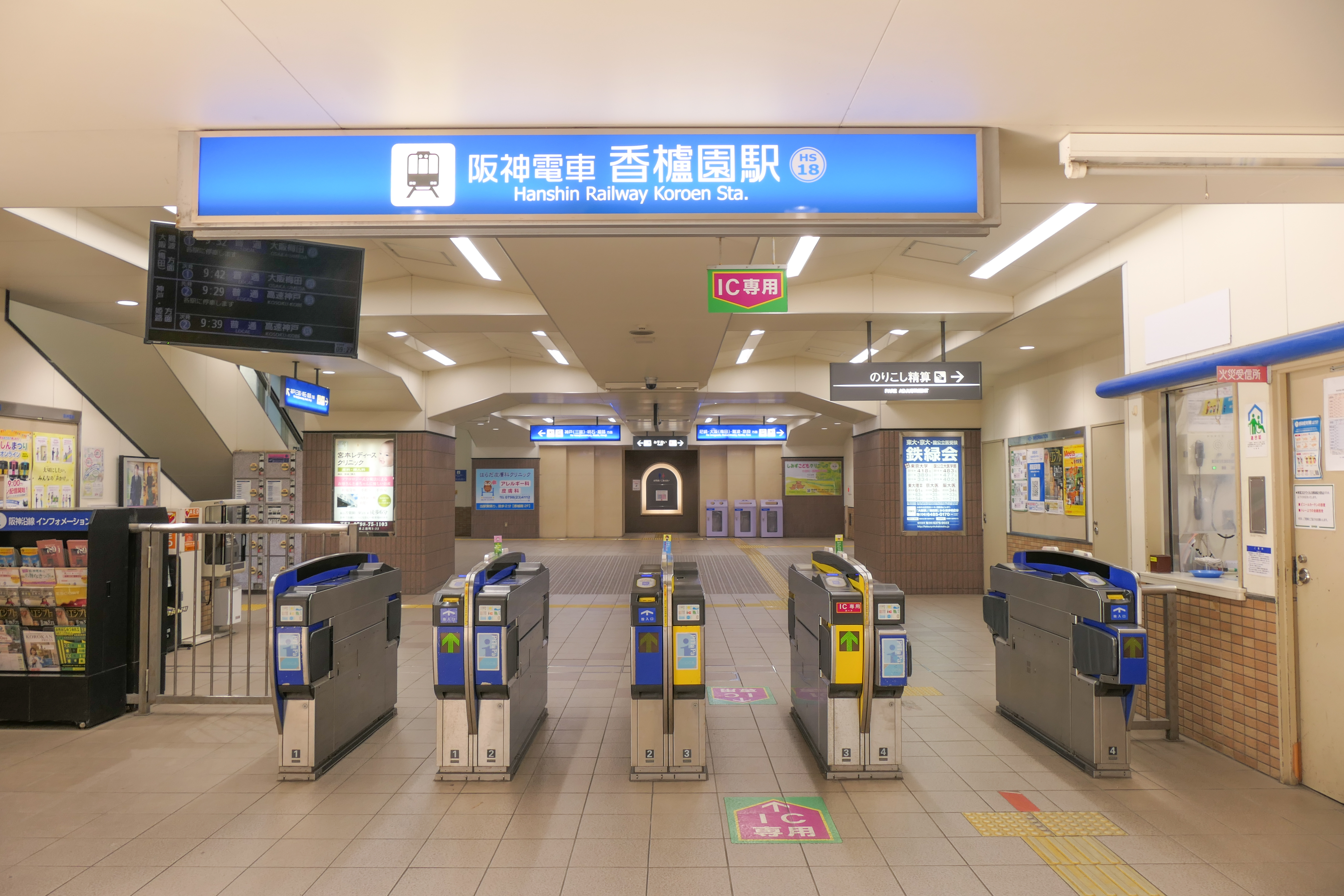
Ticketing area in December 2021

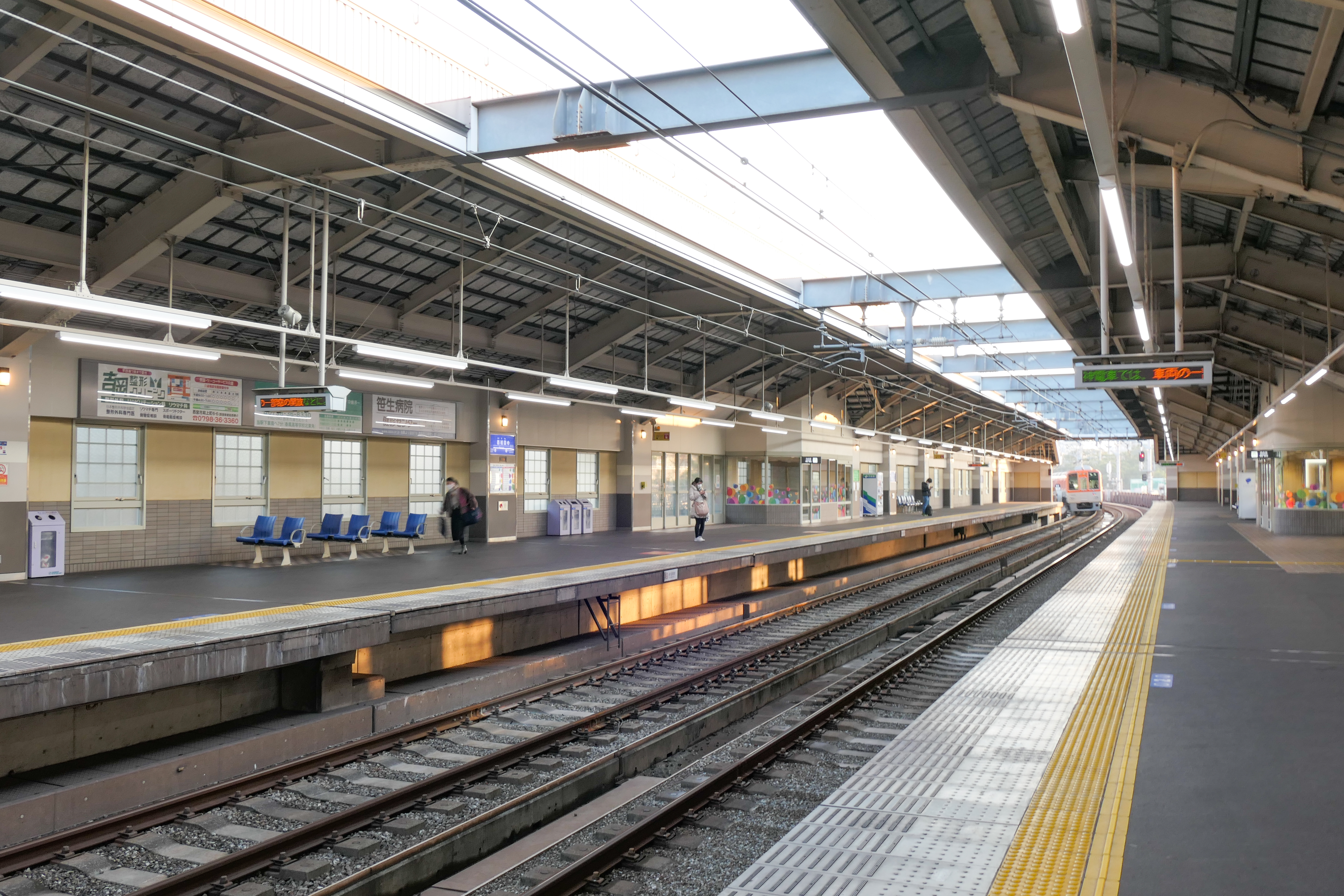
Platform view in December 2021

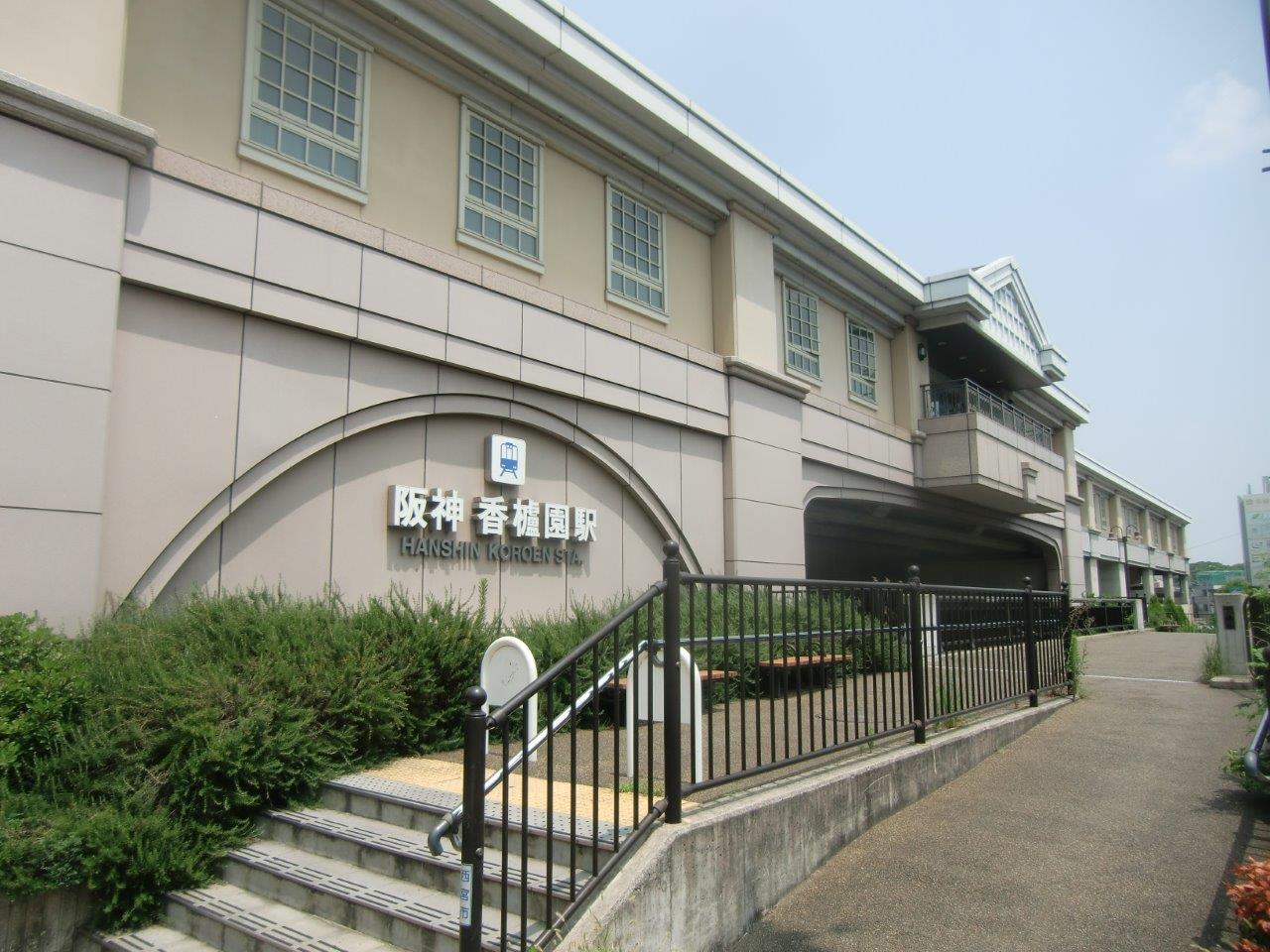
South exit in 2014

== History ==
Kōroen Station opened on 12 April 1905 along with the rest of the Hanshin Main Line.

On 17 January 1995, the station was damaged by the Great Hanshin earthquake. Service in the affected area was restored by 26 June 1995.

Station numbering was introduced on 21 December 2013, with Kōroen being designated as station number HS-18.

== Passenger statistics ==
In fiscal 2019, the station was used by an average of 5,764 passengers daily

== Surrounding area ==
- Shukugawa Park
- Nishinomiya City Otani Memorial Art Museum
- Nishinomiya City Education and Cultural Center

== See also ==
- List of railway stations in Japan
