= Hankyū Kōyō Line =

Railway line in Japan

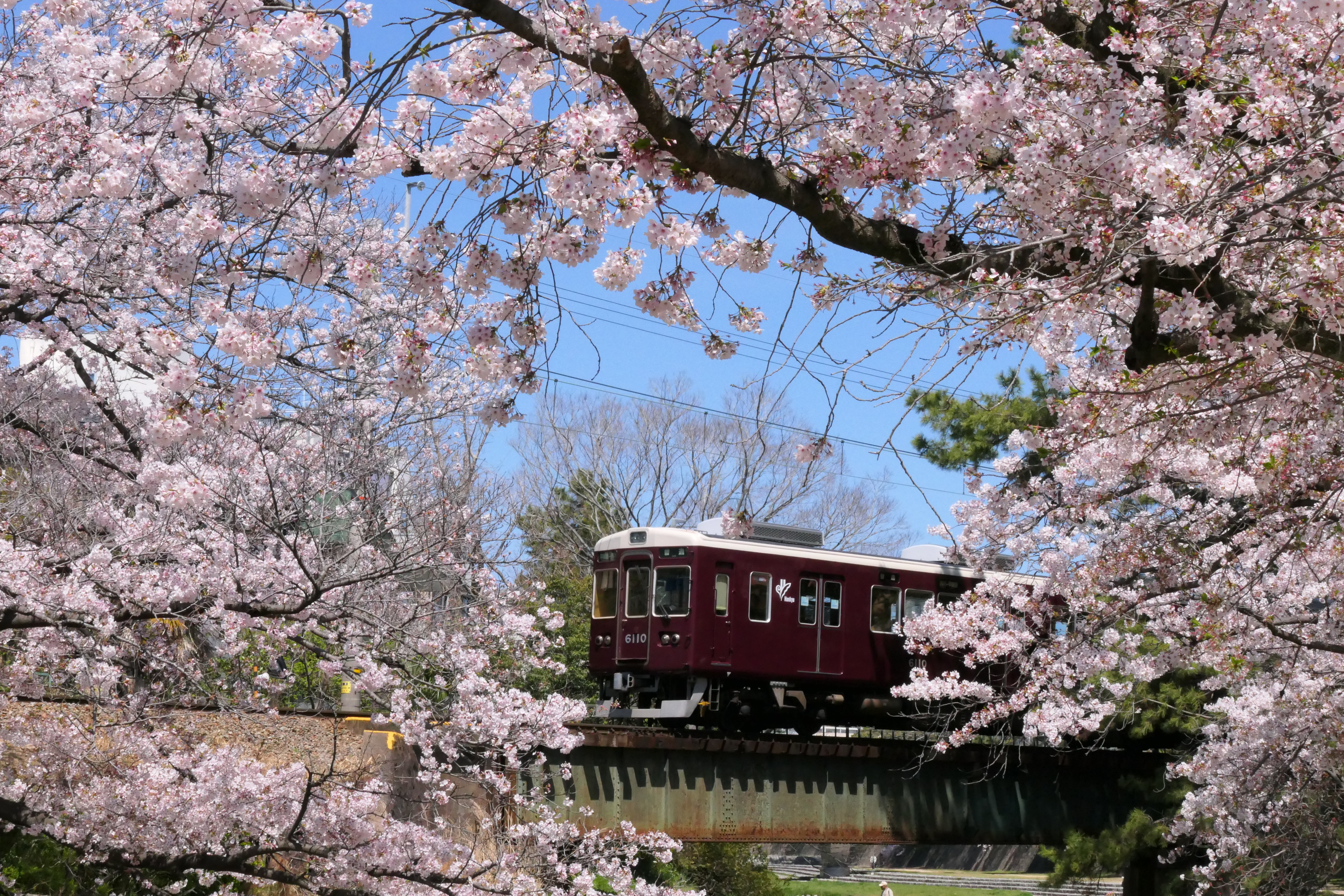
- Hankyū Kōyō Line train

Overview
- Native name: 阪急甲陽線
- Owner: Hankyu Railway
- Locale: Nishinomiya, Hyōgo, Japan
- Termini: Shukugawa; Kōyōen

Service
- Type: Heavy rail

History
- Opened: 1 October 1924; 101 years ago

Technical
- Line length: 2.2 km (1.4 mi)
- Number of tracks: Single
- Track gauge: 1,435 mm (4 ft 8 1/2 in)
- Minimum radius: 120 m
- Electrification: 1,500 V DC, overhead catenary
- Operating speed: 70 km/h (45 mph)

The Hankyū Kōyō Line (阪急甲陽線, Hankyū Kōyō-sen) is a 2.2 km (1.4 mi) single-track railway line in Hyōgo Prefecture, Japan, operated by the Hankyu Railway. The line connects Shukugawa Station and Kōyōen Station, both in Nishinomiya, Hyōgo.

== History ==
The line opened on 1 October 1924, 1435mm gauge and electrified at 600 VDC, which was increased to 1500 VDC in 1967.

The Great Hanshin earthquake resulted in the line being out of service for six weeks in 1995.

== Stations ==
All stations are within Nishinomiya, Hyōgo.

No.	Station	Japanese	Distance (km)	Transfers
HK-09	Shukugawa	夙川	0.0	Hankyū Kōbe Main Line
HK-29	Kurakuenguchi	苦楽園口	0.9	
HK-30	Kōyōen	甲陽園	2.2	
