= Kōyōen Station =

Railway station in Nishinomiya, Hyōgo Prefecture, Japan

Kōyōen Station 甲陽園駅
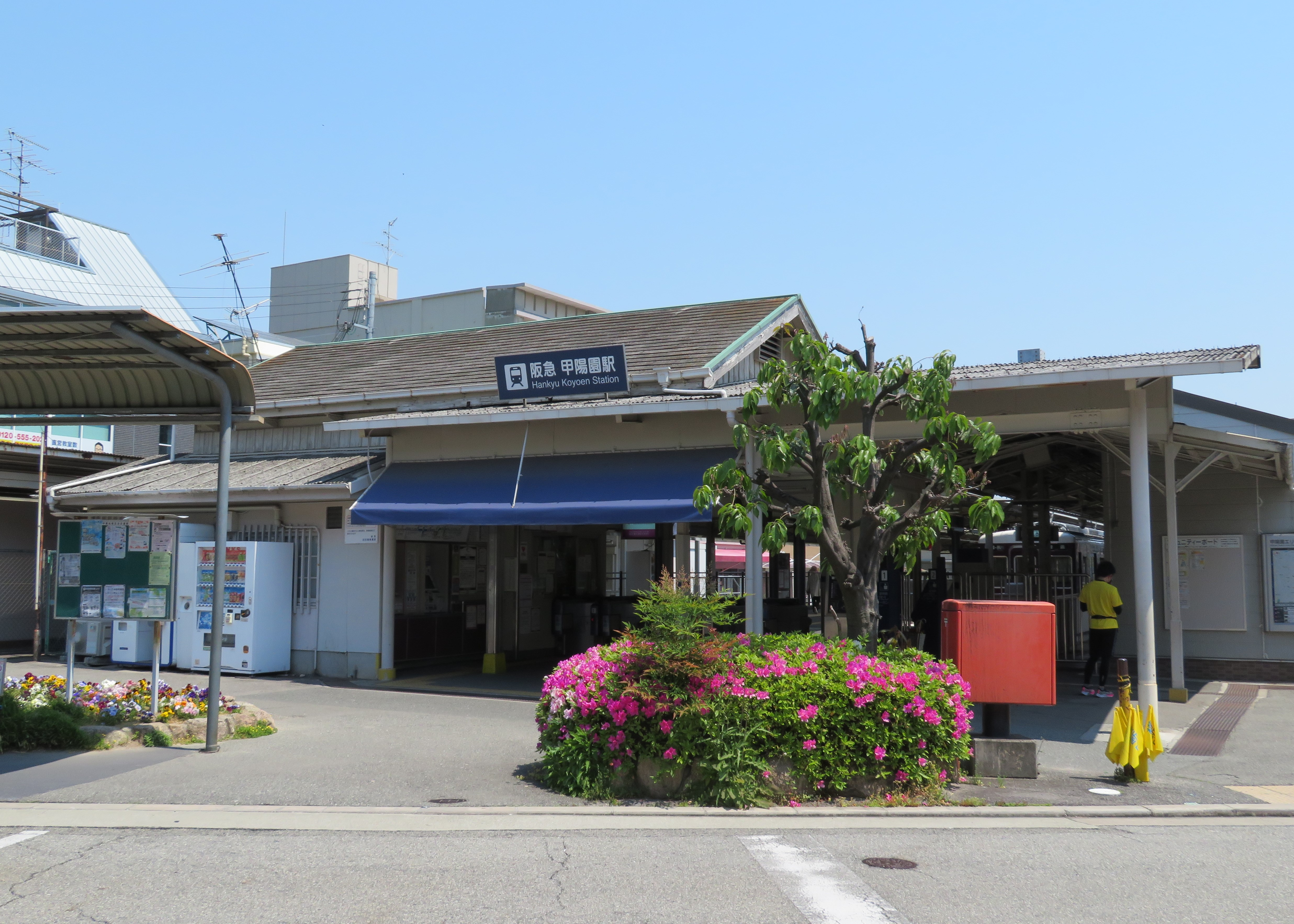
- Kōyōen Station building, April 2020

General information
- Location: Kōyōen Wakae-chō, Nishinomiya-shi, Hyōgo-ken 662-0016; Japan
- Coordinates: 34°45′39.3″N 135°19′47.9″E
- Operator: Hankyu Railway
- Line: ■ Kōyō Line
- Distance: 2.2 km from Shukugawa
- Platforms: 1 bay platform
- Connections: Bus stop

Other information
- Station code: HK-30
- Website: Official website

History
- Opened: 1 October 1924

Passengers
- FY2019: 6,723 daily

Services
| Preceding station | Hankyu Railway | Following station |
|---|---|---|
| Kurakuenguchi towards Shukugawa | Kōyō Line | Terminus |
Location
- Location within Hyōgo Prefecture Location within Japan

Kōyōen Station (甲陽園駅, Kōyōen-eki; station number: HK-30) is a passenger railway station located in the city of Nishinomiya Hyōgo Prefecture, Japan. It is operated by the private transportation company Hankyu Railway.

== Lines ==
Kōyōen Station is a terminus of the Hankyu Kōyō Line, and is located 2.2 kilometers from the opposing terminus of the line at Shukugawa.

== Station layout ==
The station consists of a single bay platform. Due to the large number of commuters using the station in the mornings, formerly a second platform and a smaller entrance on the east side of the station were used for boarding outgoing trains. Those leaving the train use the main platform. Also because of the large number of students exiting at Kōyōen Station for nearby schools the exit gate is left open allowing those students holding commuter passes to exit without going through the turnstiles.

== History ==
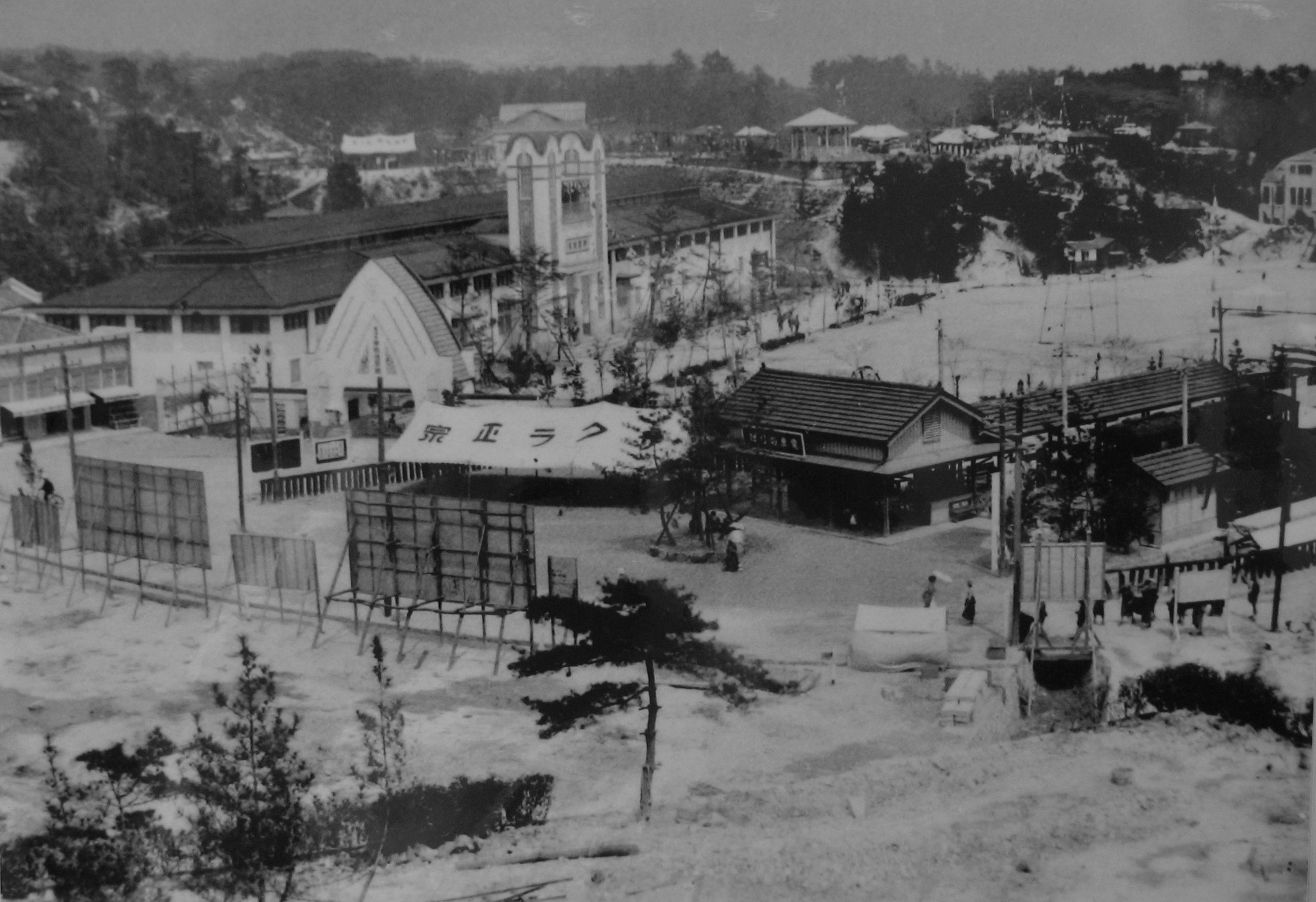
Kōyōen Station in the 1920s

The station opened on 1 October 1924.

== Passenger statistics ==
In fiscal 2019, the station was used by an average of 6,723 passengers daily

== Surrounding area ==
Kōyōen Station has access to Mount Kabutoyama.

- Nishinomiya Municipal Koyoen Elementary School
- Koyo Gakuin High School
- Hyogo Prefectural Nishinomiya Kita High School

== See also ==
- List of railway stations in Japan
