= Kurakuenguchi Station =

Railway station in Nishinomiya, Hyōgo Prefecture, Japan

Kurakuenguchi Station 苦楽園口駅
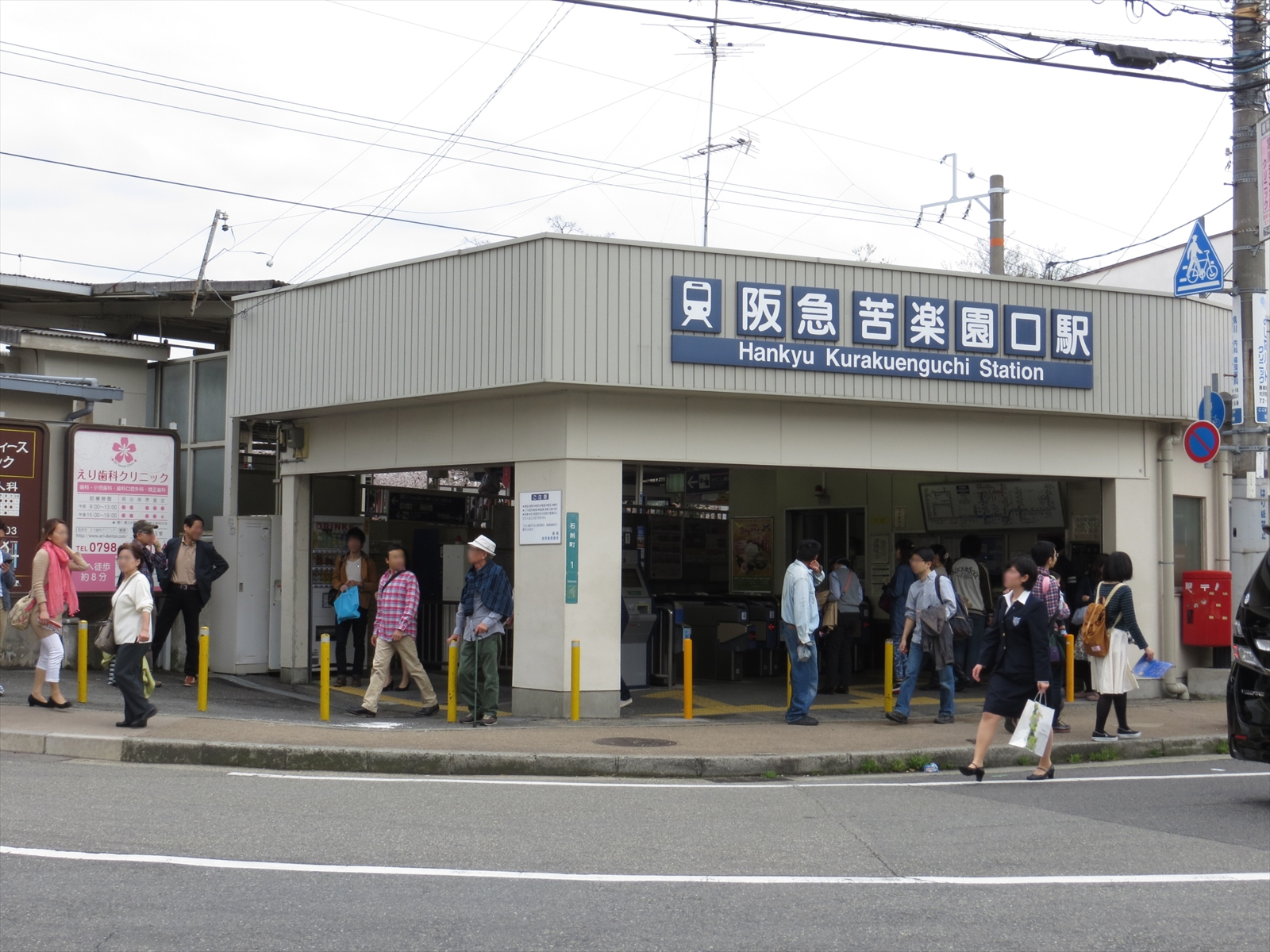
- Kurakuenguchi Station building, April 2015

General information
- Location: 1-22 Ishikacho, Nishinomiya-shi, Hyōgo-ken; Japan
- Coordinates: 34°45′0.65″N 135°19′44.19″E
- Operator: Hankyu Railway
- Line: ■ Kōyō Line
- Distance: 0.9 from Shukugawa
- Platforms: 2
- Tracks: 2

Other information
- Station code: HK-29
- Website: Official website

History
- Opened: 8 March 1925

Passengers
- FY2019: 7,532 daily

Services
Preceding station	Hankyu Railway	Following station
Shukugawa Terminus	Kōyō Line	Kōyōen Terminus
Location
- Location within Hyōgo Prefecture Location within Japan

Kurakuenguchi Station (苦楽園口駅, Kurakuenguchi-eki; station number: HK-29) is a passenger railway station located in the city of Nishinomiya Hyōgo Prefecture, Japan. It is operated by the private transportation company Hankyu Railway.

== Lines ==
Kurakuenguchi Station is served by the Hankyu Kōyō Line, and is located 0.9 kilometers from the terminus of the line at Shukugawa.

== Station layout ==
The station consists of two side platforms serving two tracks on the otherwise single-track line. Access between the platforms is via an underground passageway.

== History ==
The station opened on 8 March 1925.

== Passenger statistics ==
In fiscal 2019, the station was used by an average of 7,532 passengers daily

== Surrounding area ==
- Kurakuen - One of Nishinomiya's seven gardens and a luxury residential area.
- Shukugawa - The Nakaniida River merges on the south side of the station.
- Shukugawa Park
- Nishinomiya Municipal Kitashukugawa Elementary School

== See also ==
- List of railway stations in Japan
