= Yongdap-dong =

- Yongdap-dong in 2024.
- Interactive map of Yongdap-dong
- Country: South Korea

Area
  - Total: 2.32 km^{2} (0.90 sq mi)

Population (2001)
  - Total: 20,451
  - Density: 8,820/km^{2} (22,800/sq mi)

Korean name
- Hangul: 용답동
- Hanja: 龍踏洞
- RR: Yongdap-dong
- MR: Yongdap-tong

Yongdap-dong (Korean: 용답동) is a dong (neighbourhood) of Seongdong District, Seoul, South Korea.

== See also ==
- Administrative divisions of South Korea
