= Itami Station =

Itami Station is the name of two train stations in Itami, Hyogo, Japan:

- Itami Station (JR West)
- Itami Station (Hankyu)
