= Inano Station =

Railway station in Itami, Hyōgo Prefecture, Japan

Coordinates: 34.7648°N 135.4153°E

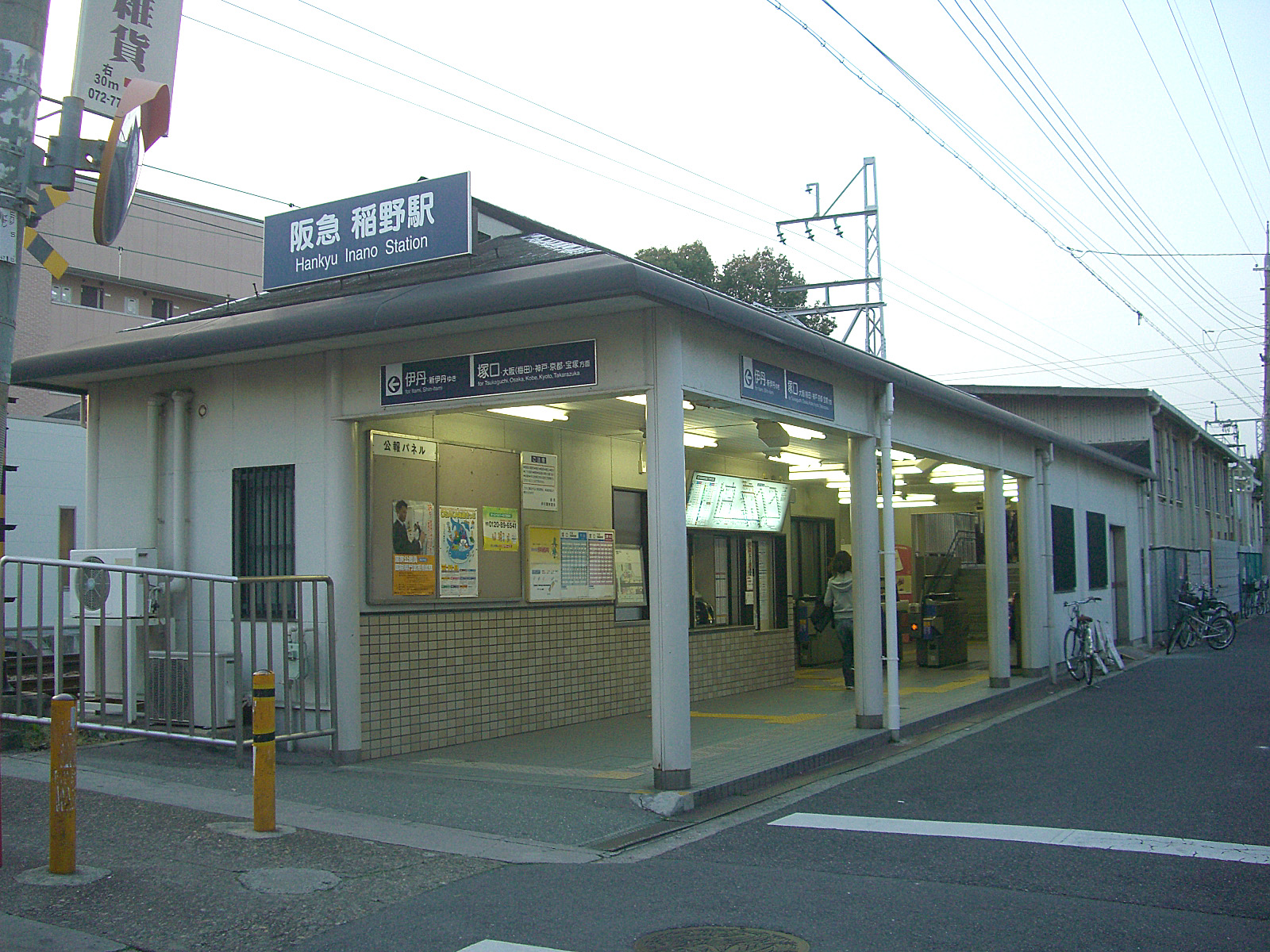
- Station building

General information
- Location: 1 Chome Inanocho, Itami, Hyogo 664-0861, Japan
- Owner: Hankyu Railway
- Line: Hankyū Itami Line
- Platforms: Ground Station

Other information
- Station code: HK 18

History
- Opened: May 10, 1921

Passengers
- 2016: 8,383 people/day

Services
Preceding station	Hankyu Railway	Following station
Tsukaguchi Terminus	Itami Line	Shin-Itami towards Itami
Location

Inano Station (稲野駅, Inano-eki) is a Hankyu railway station in Itami, Hyōgo Prefecture, Japan. The station number is HK-18. Prior to opening, the station was temporarily called Itamiguchi (伊丹口).

== History ==
- 1921 (Taishō 10)
  - May 10 – Hanshin Express Railway (Later Hankyu Electric Railway) opened between Tsukaguchi Station and Itami Station on the Itami Line.
- 1995 (Heisei 7)
  - January 17 – Itami Station was damaged by the Great Hanshin-Awaji Earthquake, and all lines were suspended.
  - January 21 – Services for stations between Tsukaguchi and Itami stations were restored.
- 2013 (Heisei 25)
  - December 21 – Station numbering was introduced.

== Station structure ==
Inano station is an above-ground station with platforms on both sides. It is classified as a stop due to the lack of a railroad switch or railway signals.

The station building and ticket gates are located at the south end of the station (nearer Tsukaguchi) for each platform. Since there is no overpass connecting the platforms inside the ticket gate, it is necessary to use the railroad crossing outside the ticket gates, which are adjacent to the station building.

Internal railroad crossings for passengers did previously exist, but were removed in accord with Hankyu Corporation policy. Therefore, if passengers enter the station by mistake, they now must tell the station staff they wish to exit. As there are no station staff at the ticket gate of the Tsukaguchi-bound platform, passengers there are obliged to use the intercom near the ticket gate to summon station staff.

Restrooms are located near the ticket gate on the Itami-bound platform, and the Tsukaguchi-bound platform has a waiting room and vending machine for soft drinks.

In 2007, construction near the ticket gates was carried out on both platforms, and slopes were renovated along with toilets. The restroom was relocated and now stands where there had previously been a temporary entrance for passengers at the ticket gate for Itami that had fallen into disuse.
