= Mukonosō Station =

Railway station in Amagasaki, Hyōgo Prefecture, Japan

Mukonosō Station 武庫之荘駅
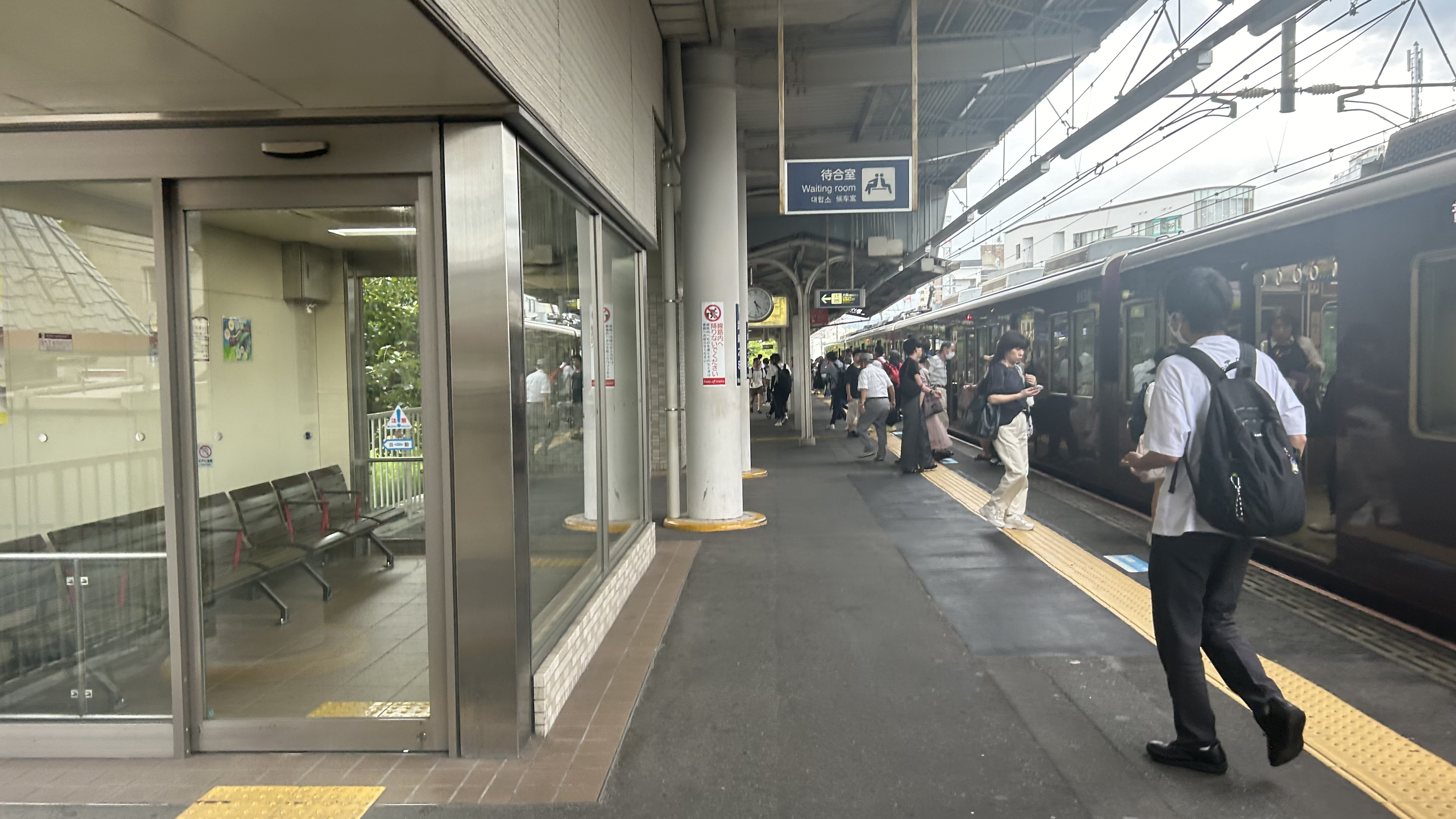

General information
- Location: 1-chōme-1 Minamimukonosō, Amagasaki-shi, Hyōgo-ken 661-0033; Japan
- Coordinates: 34°45′5.82″N 135°23′35.21″E
- Operator: Hankyu Railway.
- Line: ■ Hankyu Kobe Line
- Distance: 12.3 km (7.6 miles) from Osaka-umeda
- Platforms: 2 side platforms
- Tracks: 2
- Connections: Bus terminal

Other information
- Status: Staffed
- Station code: HK-07
- Website: Official website

History
- Opened: 20 October 1937

Passengers
- FY2019: 39,375 daily

Services
Hankyu Railway Kōbe Main Line (HK 07)
Tsukaguchi (HK 06)	Local	Nishinomiya-kitaguchi (HK 08)
Tsukaguchi (HK 06)	Commutation Express	Nishinomiya-kitaguchi (HK 08)
others: Does not stop at this station
Location
- Location within Hyōgo Prefecture Location within Japan

Mukonosō Station (武庫之荘駅, Mukonosō-eki; station number: HK-07) is a passenger railway station located in the city of Amagasaki, Hyōgo Prefecture, Japan. It is operated by the private transportation company Hankyu Railway.

== Lines ==
Mukonosō Station is served by the Hankyu Kobe Line, and is located 12.3 kilometres (7.6 miles) from the terminus of the line at Osaka-umeda.

== Layout ==
The station consists of two ground-level opposed side platforms, connect by both a footbridge and an underground passage.

=== Platforms ===
1	■ Kobe Line	for Kobe (Kobe-sannomiya, Shinkaichi), Nishinomiya-kitaguchi, Kōyōen and Takarazuka
2	■ Kobe Line	for Osaka (Umeda, Jūsō), Kyoto (Kawaramachi, Arashiyama), Itami, Kita-Senri and Minoo

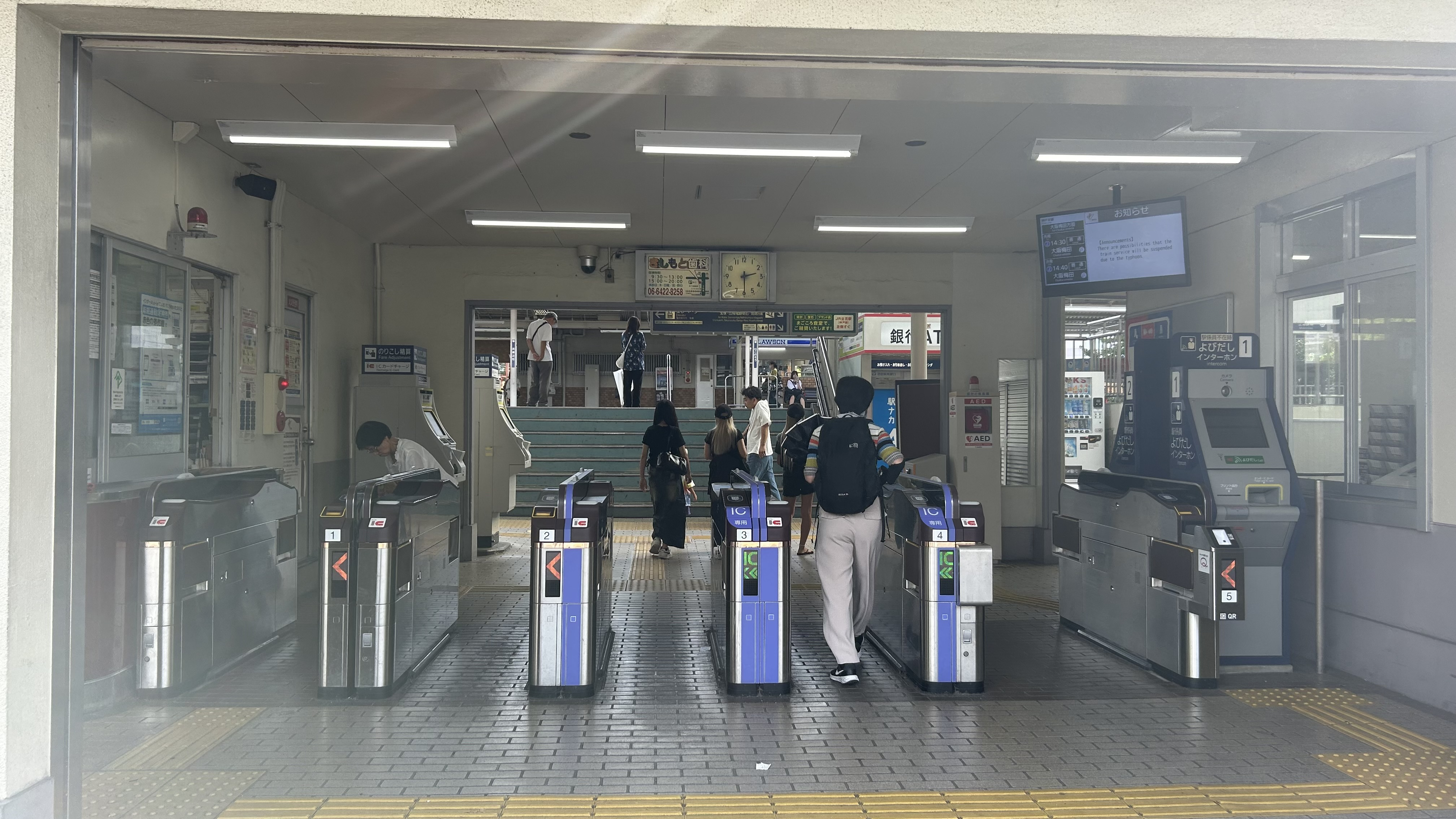
North gate

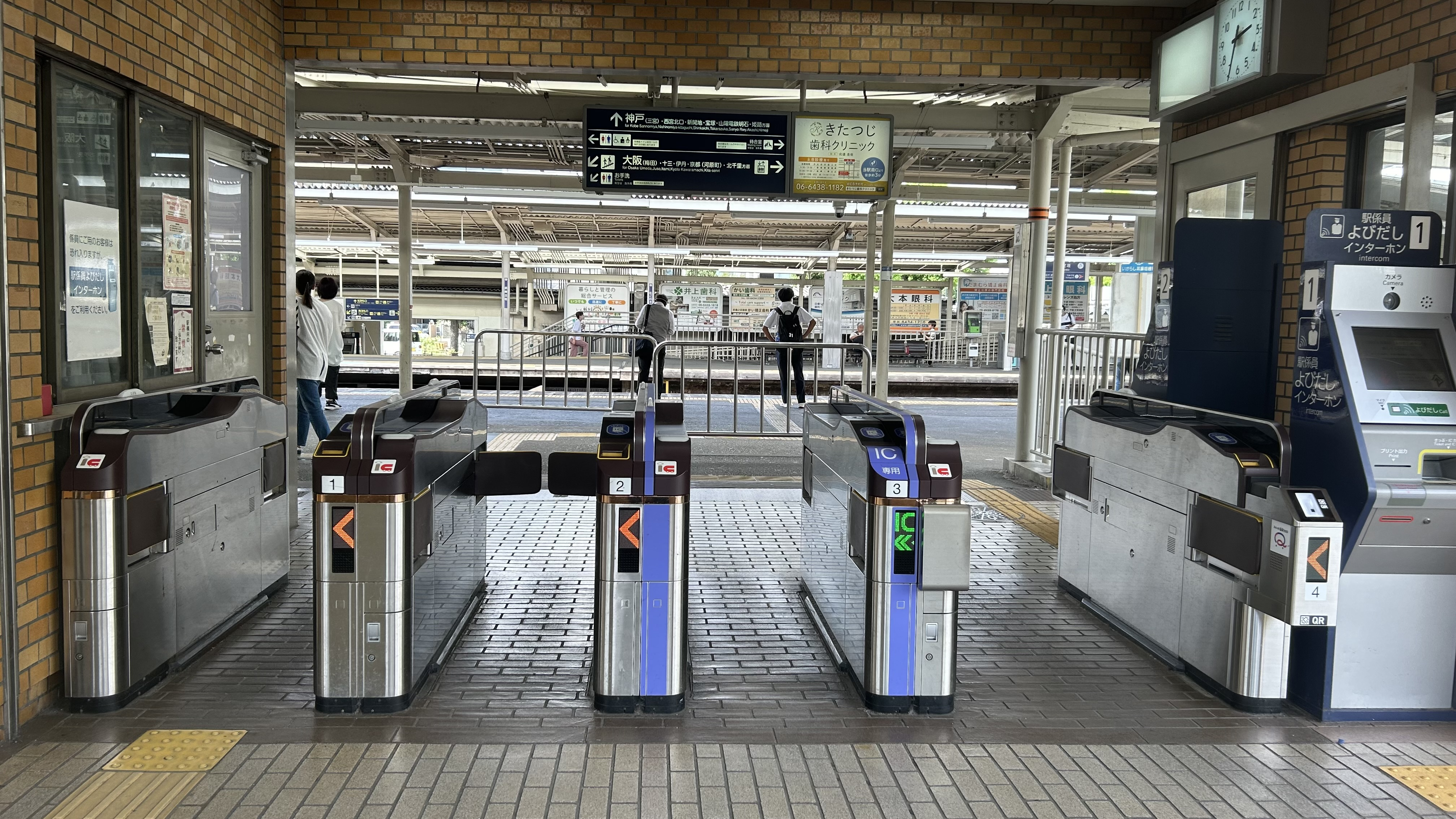
South gate

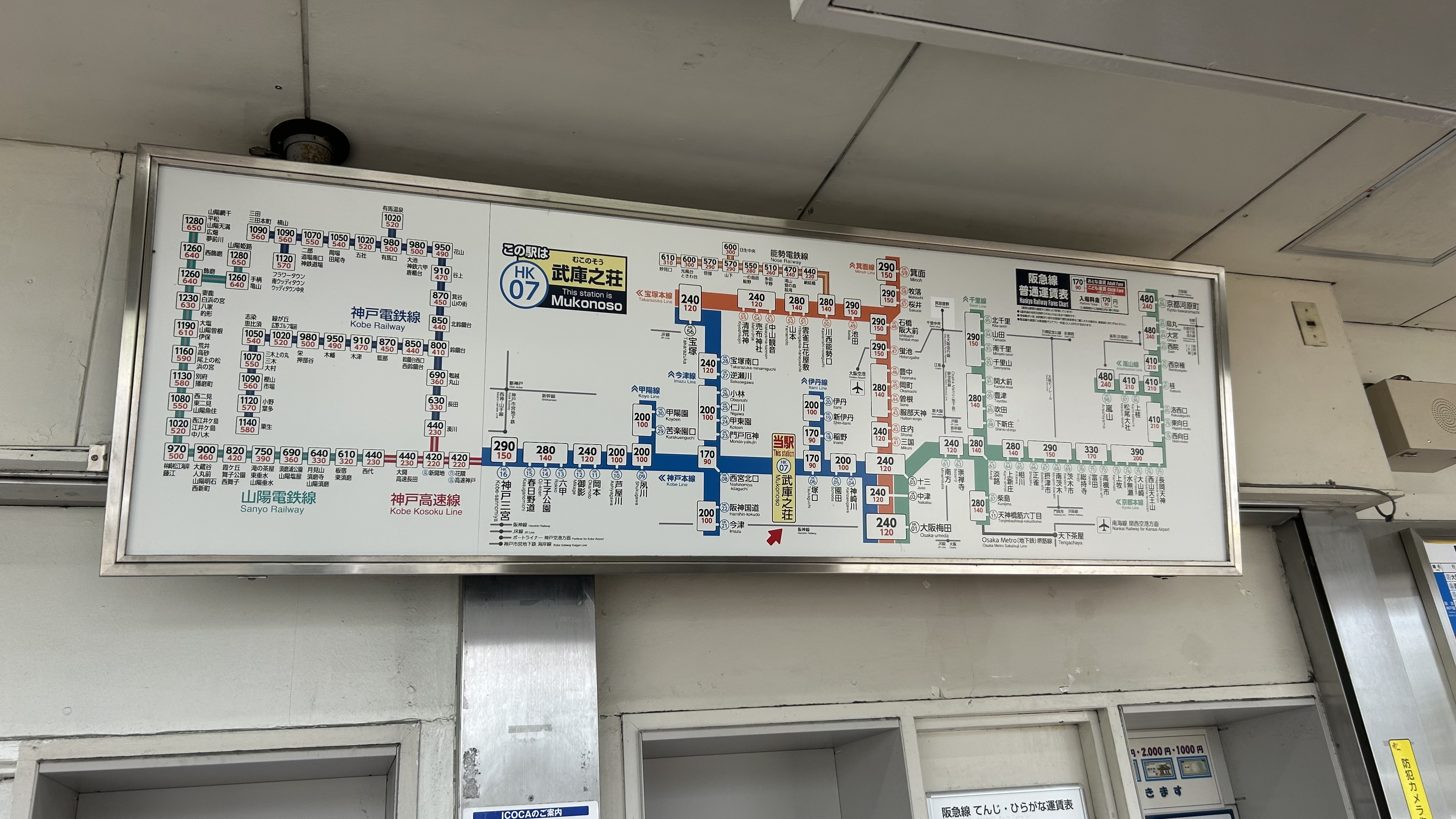
Fare list

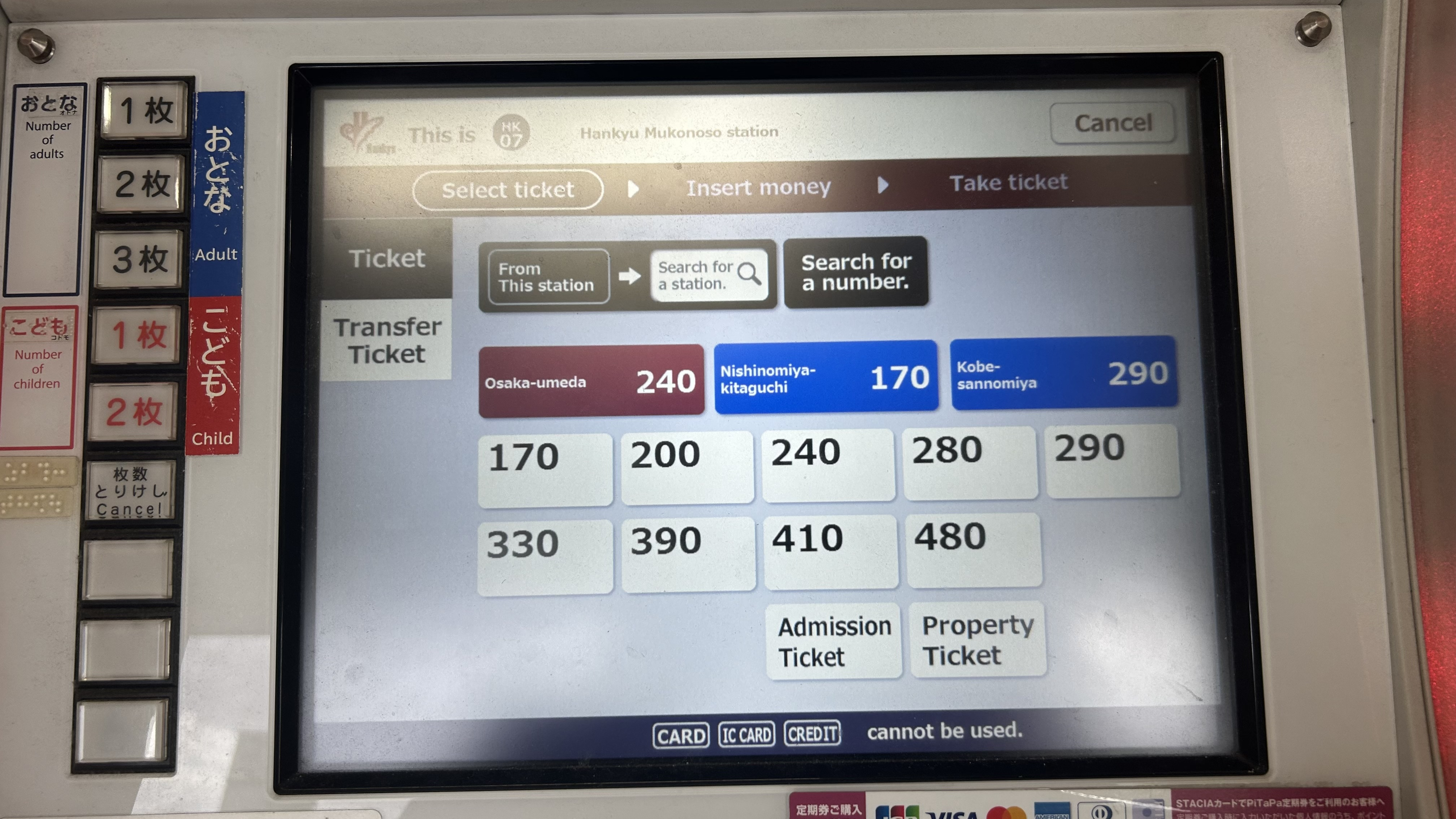
Ticket machine screen

== History ==
Mukonosō Station opened on 20 October 1937.

Station numbering was introduced on 21 December 2013, with Mukonosō being designated as station number HK-07.

== Passenger statistics ==
In fiscal 2019, the station was used by an average of 39,375 passengers daily

== Surrounding area ==
- Nishimuko Park (Traffic park)
- Amagasaki City North Library
- Kansai Rosai Hospital
- Kobe District Court Amagasaki Branch
- College of Industrial Technorogy

== Buses ==
Buses are operated by Hanshin Bus (Amagasaki City Line) .

North side

- Bus stop 1
  - Route 45 for Muko-eigyosho via Mukonogo and Muko-motomachi
  - Route 46 for Muko-eigyosho via Mukonoso 3chome and Nishimuko
- Bus stop 2
  - Route 40 for Miyanokita-danchi via Noma-nishi, Tokitomo and Joyo Junior High School
  - Route 41 for Miyanokita-danchi via Mukonogo, Muko Branch Office and Joyo Junior High School
  - Route 41-2 for Miyanokita-danchi via Mukonogo, Tomoyuki-nishiguchi and Joyo Junior High School
- Bus stop 3
  - Route 48 for JR Amagasaki (south) via Kaminoshima, Tachibana Branch Office, Obamacho 2chome and Nishinagasu-hondori 2chome
  - Route 48-2 for JR Amagasaki (south) via Kaminoshima, Tachibana Branch Office and Obamacho 2chome

South side

- Bus stop 4
  - Route 15 for Hanshin Amagasaki via JR Tachibana, City Hall, Chuo Community Center and Higashinaniwacho 3chome
  - Route 47 for Mukogawa via JR Tachibana, Imakita, Nishi Fire Station and Ohsho-nishi
  - Route 47-2 for Mukogawa via JR Tachibana, Imakita, Rosai Hospital, Inabaso 1chome and Ohsho-nishi
- Bus stop 5
  - Route 43,43-2 for Hanshin Amagasaki via Rosai Hospital, JR Tachibana, City Hall and Waterworks Bureau
  - Route 49 for Hanshin Deyashiki via Rosai Hospital, JR Tachibana, City Hall and Showadori 8chome
- Bus stop 6
  - Route 43 for Miyanokita-danchi via Kinki Central Hospital, Noma-nishi, Tsunematsu and Nishikoya
  - Route 43-2 for Muko-eigyosho via Kinki Central Hospital, Noma-nishi, Tsunematsu and Muko Branch Office
  - Route 47,47-2 for Muko-eigyosho via Moribe Park and Nishimuko

== See also ==
- List of railway stations in Japan
