= Shin-Itami Station =

Railway station in Itami, Hyōgo Prefecture, Japan

Coordinates: 34.7728°N 135.4156°E

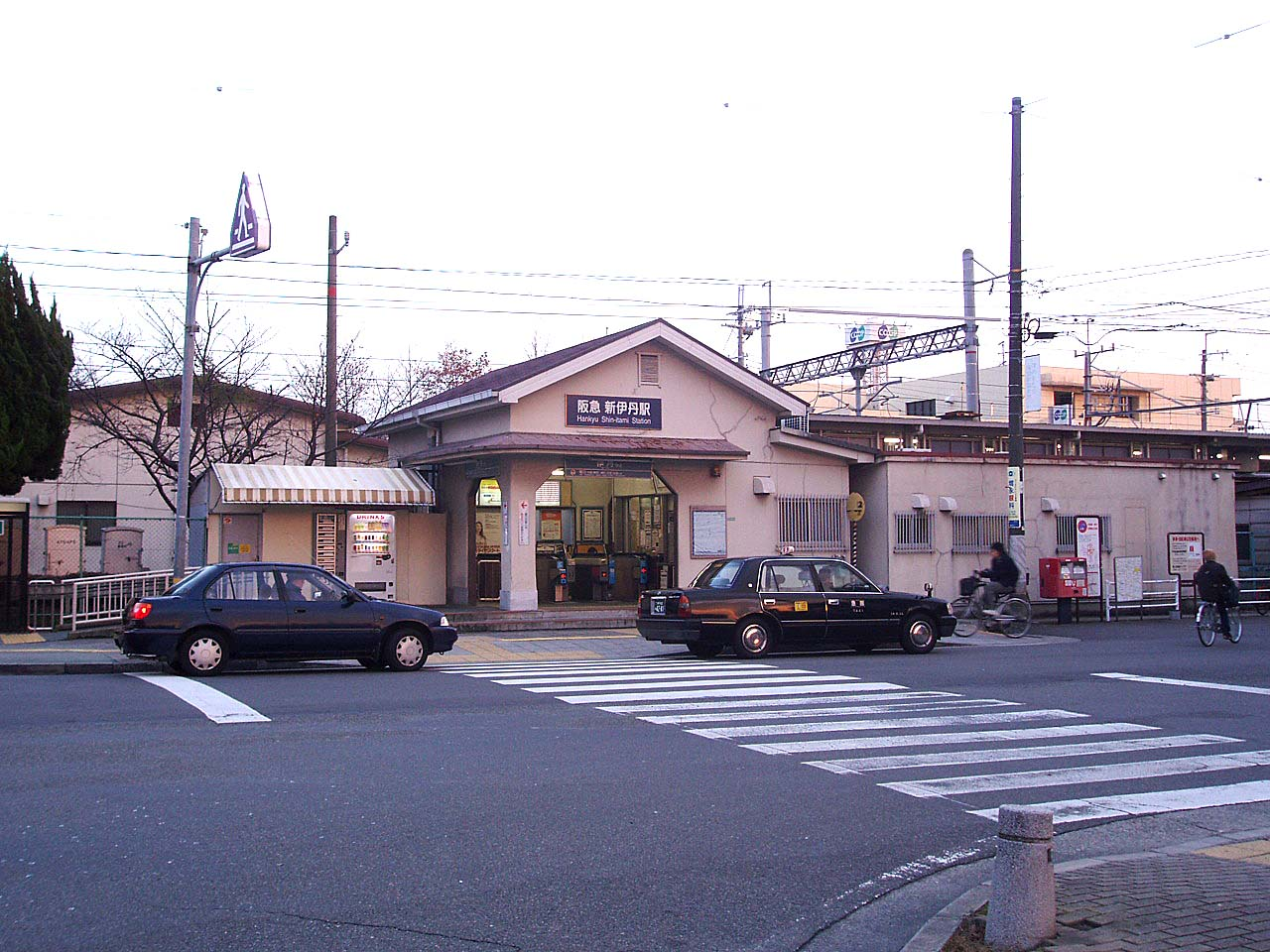
Station building

Shin-Itami Station (新伊丹駅, Shin-Itami-eki) is a train station in Itami, Hyōgo Prefecture, Japan.

== Lines ==
- Hankyu Railway
  - Itami Line

== Adjacent stations ==
Preceding station	Hankyu Railway	Following station
Inano towards Tsukaguchi	Itami Line	Itami Terminus
