= Katsuki Yamazaki =

Japanese baseball player (born 1982)

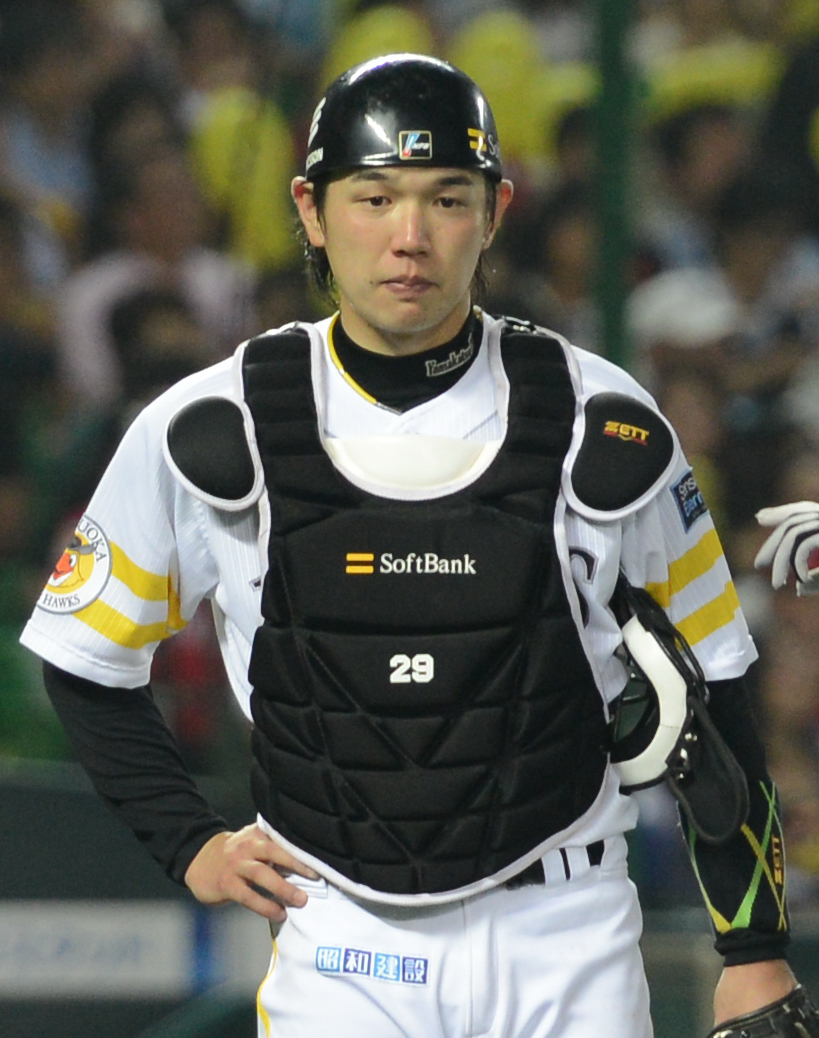
- Yamazaki with the SoftBank Hawks

Orix Buffaloes – No. 74
- Catcher / Coach
- Born: September 24, 1982 (age 43); Itami, Hyōgo
- Batted: Right Threw: Right

NPB debut
- August 7, 2005, for the Fukuoka SoftBank Hawks

Last NPB appearance
- November 6, 2020, for the Orix Buffaloes

NPB statistics (through 2020 season)
- Batting average: .196
- Home runs: 4
- Runs batted in: 112
- Stats at Baseball Reference

Teams
- As player: Fukuoka Daiei Hawks Fukuoka SoftBank Hawks (2005–2013); Orix Buffaloes (2014–2020); As coach: Orix Buffaloes (2021–present)

Katsuki Yamazaki (山崎 勝己, born August 16, 1982) is a Japanese former professional baseball catcher. He has played in Nippon Professional Baseball (NPB) for the Fukuoka Daiei Hawks / Fukuoka SoftBank Hawks and Orix Buffaloes.

== Career ==
Fukuoka Daiei Hawks selected Yamazaki with the forth selection in the 2000 NPB draft.

On August 7, 2005, Yamazaki made his NPB debut.

On November 4, 2020, Yamazaki announced his retirement.
