= Hankyū Itami Line =

Railway line in Hyogo prefecture, Japan

Hankyu Itami Line
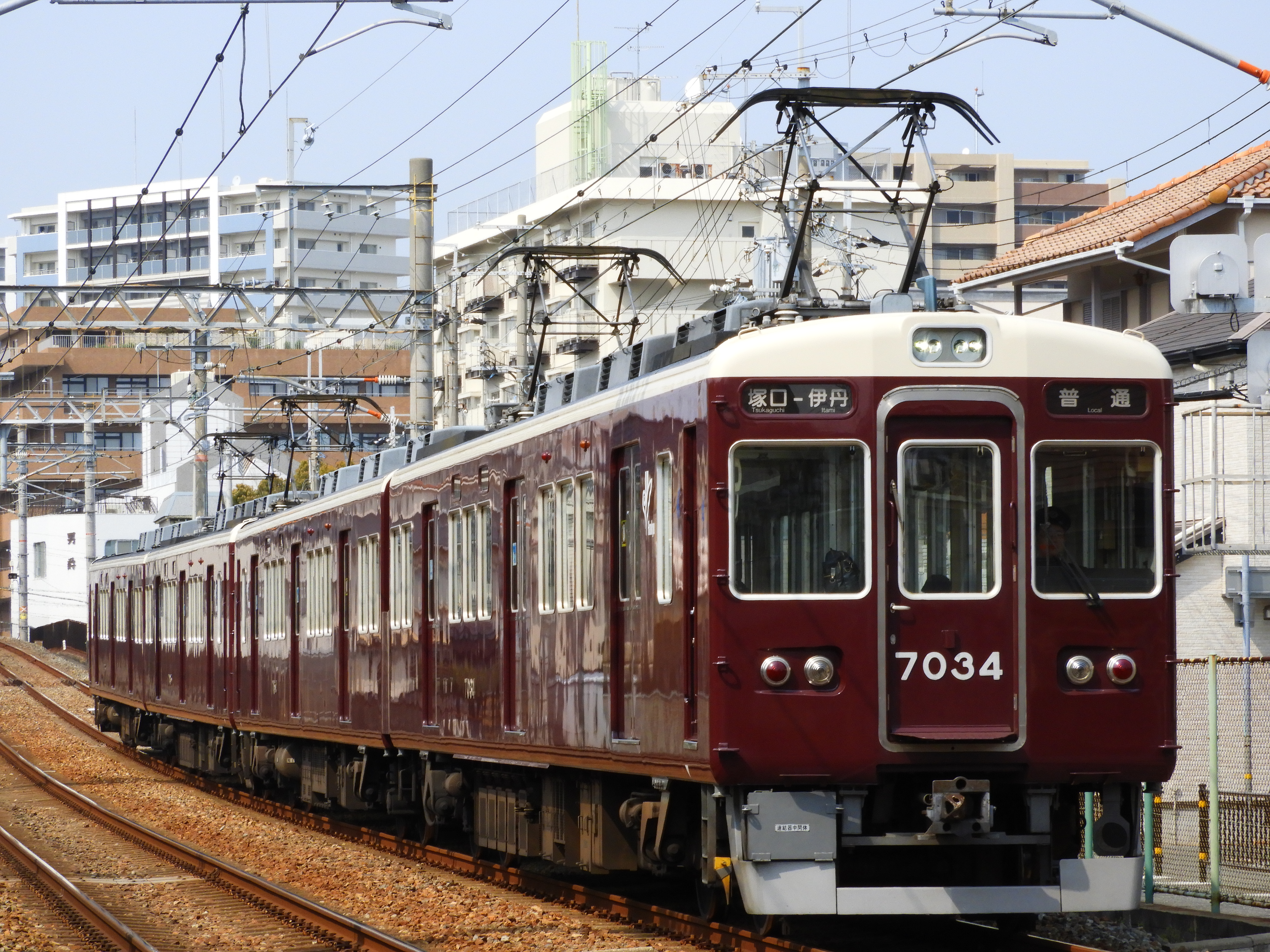
- Itami Line train (Hankyu 7000 series)

Overview
- Native name: 阪急伊丹線
- Locale: Kansai
- Stations: 4

Service
- Operator(s): Hankyu Railway
- Depot(s): Nishinomiya Depot

History
- Opened: 16 July 1920; 105 years ago

Technical
- Line length: 3.1 km (1.9 mi)
- Number of tracks: Double
- Track gauge: 1,435 mm (4 ft 8 1/2 in)
- Electrification: 1,500 V DC, overhead lines
- Operating speed: 70 km/h (43 mph)
Route map

The Itami Line (伊丹線, Itami-sen) is a railway line of Hankyu Railway in Hyōgo Prefecture, Japan. It connects Tsukaguchi Station in the city of Amagasaki and Itami Station in the city of Itami. It extends 3.1 kilometres (1.9 mi).

== History ==
The line opened, electrified at 600 VDC in 1920, and duplicated in 1943. The voltage was raised to 1500 VDC in 1967.

The Itami station building collapsed during the Great Hanshin earthquake in 1995, and a temporary station opened 400m south of the original station three months later while the original station was torn down and rebuilt. A single track was restored to the rebuilt station site in 1998, and dual track service resumed in 1999.

== Stations ==
- All trains of the Itami Line stop at all four stations (including both ends).
- All stations are in Hyōgo Prefecture

No.	Name		Distance (km)	Between (km)	Connections	Location
HK-06	Tsukaguchi	塚口	-	0.0	Hankyū Kōbe Main Line	Amagasaki
HK-18	Inano	稲野	1.4	1.4		Itami
HK-19	Shin-Itami	新伊丹	0.8	2.2		Itami
HK-20	Itami	伊丹	0.9	3.1		Itami
