= Itami City Museum of Insects =

Museum in Hyōgo Prefecture, Japan

- 伊丹市昆虫館
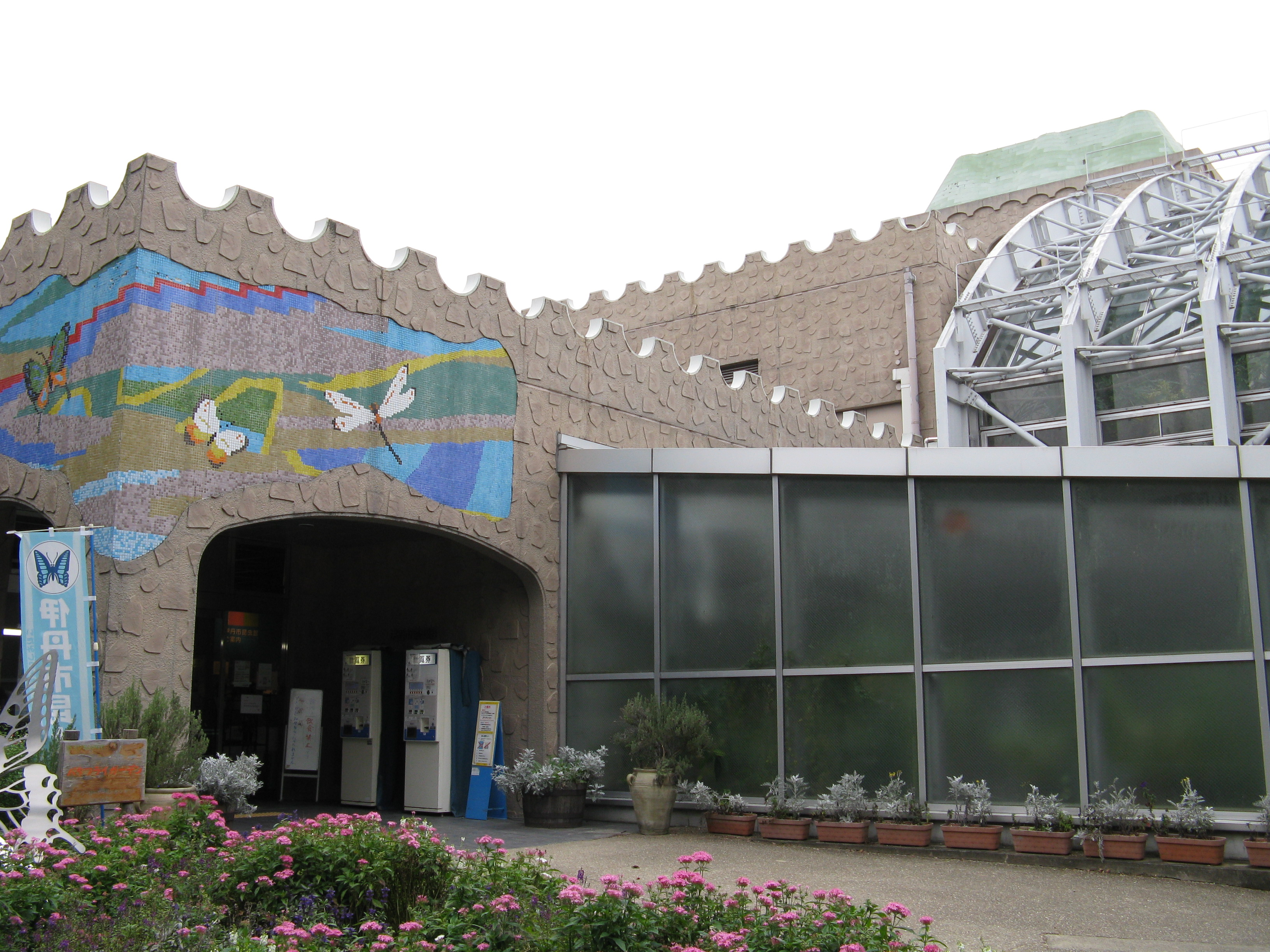
- Itami City Museum of Insects
- Established: 1990
- Location: Itami, Hyogo Prefecture, Japan
- Coordinates: 34°47′29″N 135°23′41″E
- Type: Insectarium
- Director: Kiyoichi Okuyama
- Owner: Itami City
- Website: https://www.itakon.com/

Itami City Museum of Insects (Japanese: 伊丹市昆虫館, Itami-shi konchūkan) is an insectarium in Itami, Hyogo Prefecture, Japan.

== History ==
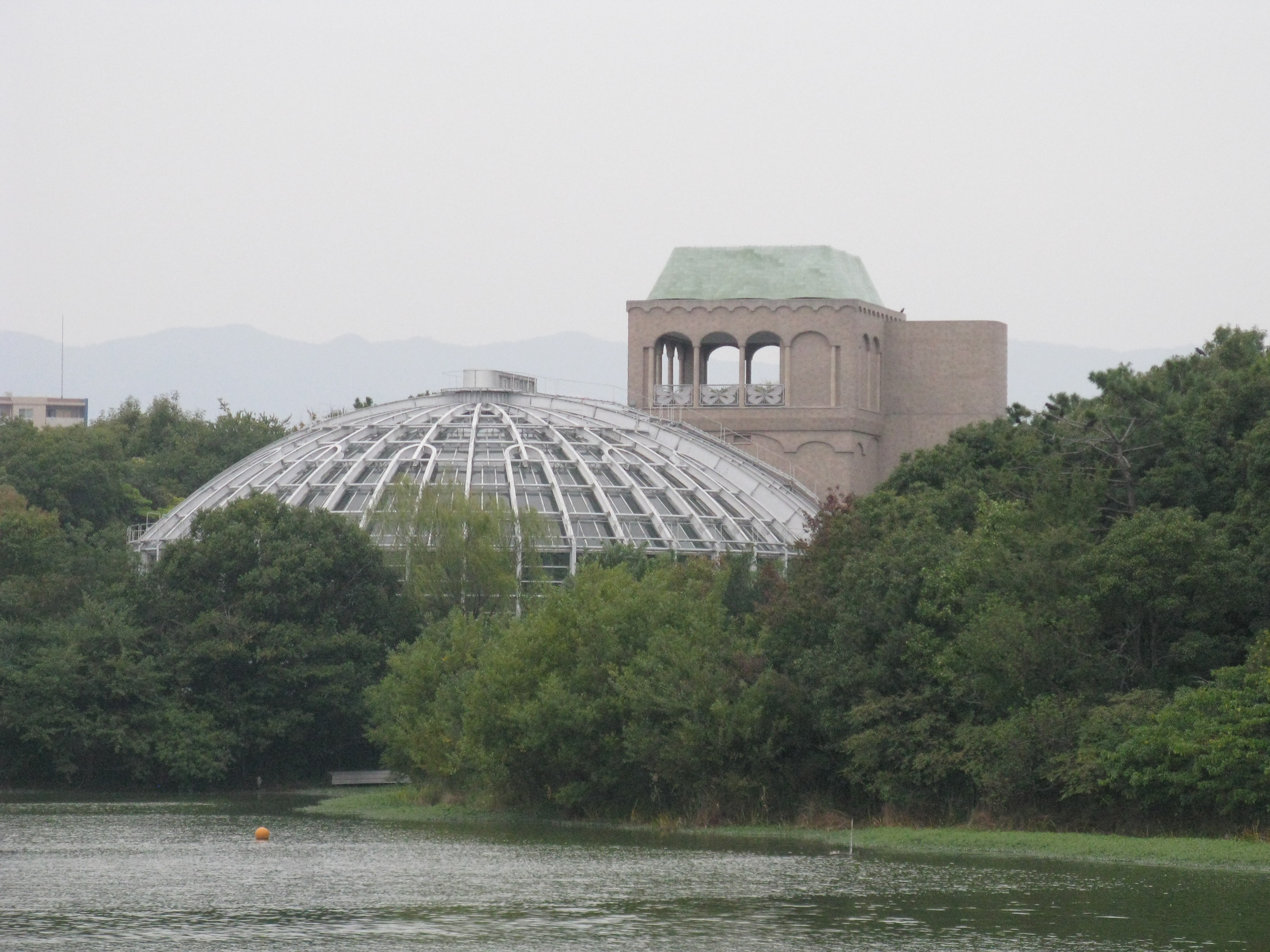
The insectarium seen from the opposite bank of Koyaike Pond. The dome-shaped building is a butterfly greenhouse.

The museum opened in 1990 to commemorate the 50th anniversary of Itami City. Initially, the Itami Park Greenery Association managed the facility, but the association was dissolved at the end of March 2013 and the museum moved under the management of Itami City, and is managed by Itami City Cultural Promotion Foundation. The first museum director was Azusa Tanaka, and since April 2012, Kiyoichi Okuyama.

Itami City Insectarium Friends' Association is an organization that helps the experience at the museum to be enjoyable. Upon presenting a "clover card" issued to preschoolers and elementary and junior high school students residing in municipalities of Itami, Takarazuka, Kawanishi, Sanda, and Inagawa-cho, children could enter the museum free of charge. However, the clover card was abolished at the end of March 2014.

In 2006, the museum was one of the organizers of the Singing insects and Gocho event that began in Itami.

In 2011, the museum carried out restoration work on insect specimens held by the Rikuzentakata City Museum in Iwate Prefecture, which were damaged in the 2011 Tōhoku earthquake and tsunami.

== Insectarium ==
Floor 1

- Butterfly greenhouse
- Ecological exhibition room
- Exhibition room 1
- Video hall
- Special exhibition room

Floor 2

- Study room
- Exhibition room 2

=== Butterfly greenhouse ===
The dome-shaped butterfly greenhouse houses a total of about 1,000 butterflies from 14 different species living in Itami and Okinawa. Below are some of the butterfly species found at the museum.

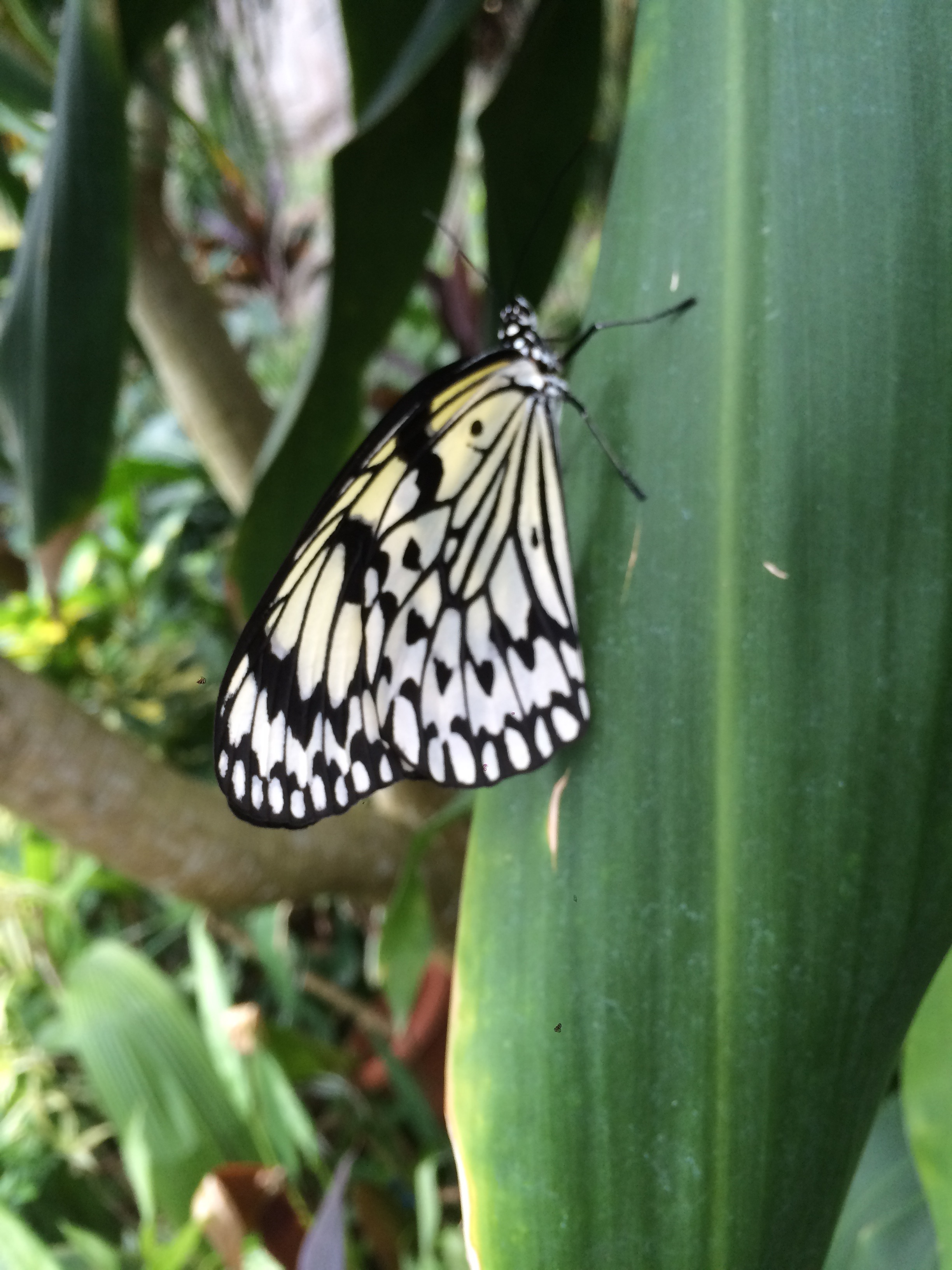
Idea leuconoe

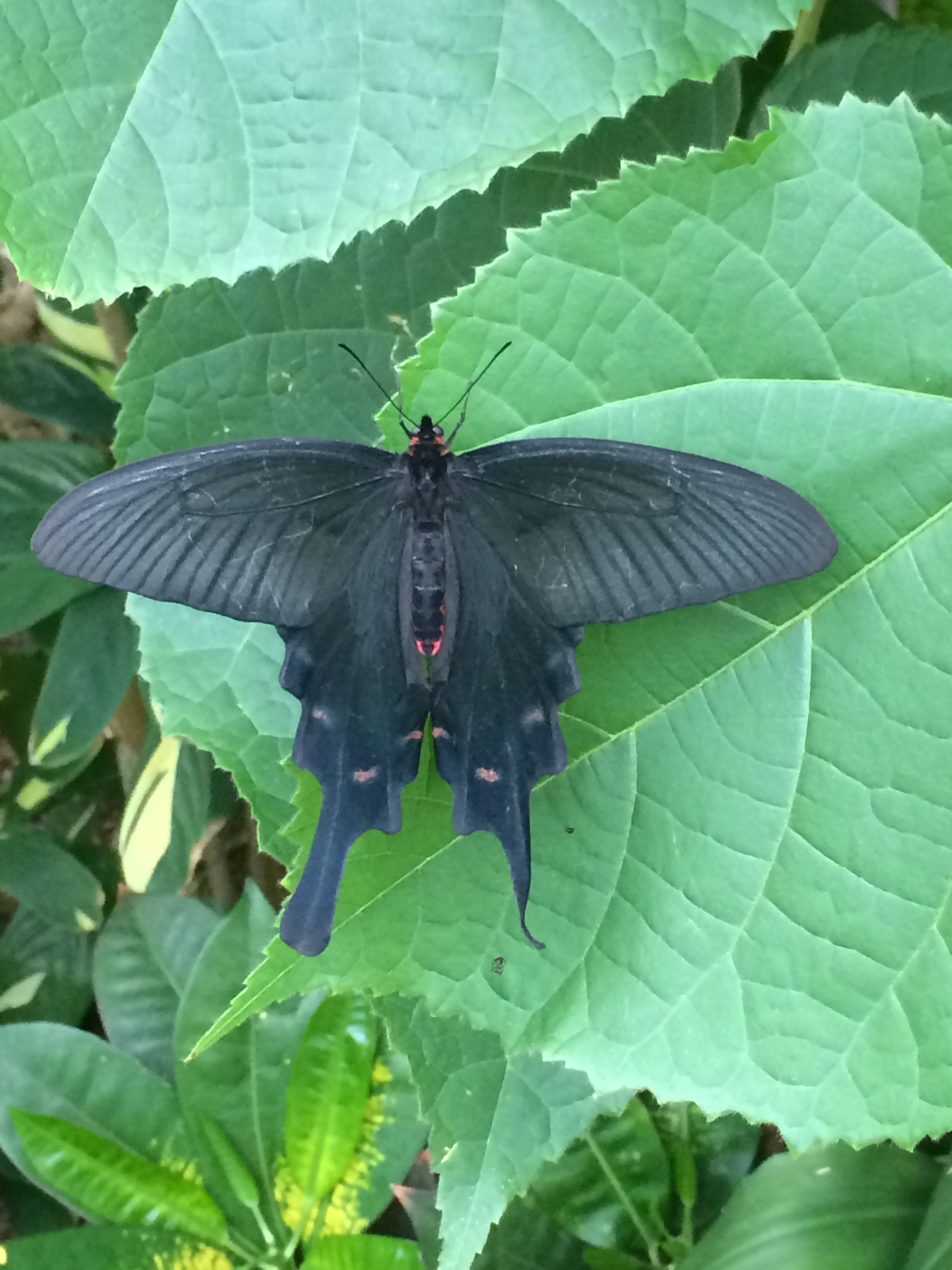
Byasa alcinous (male)

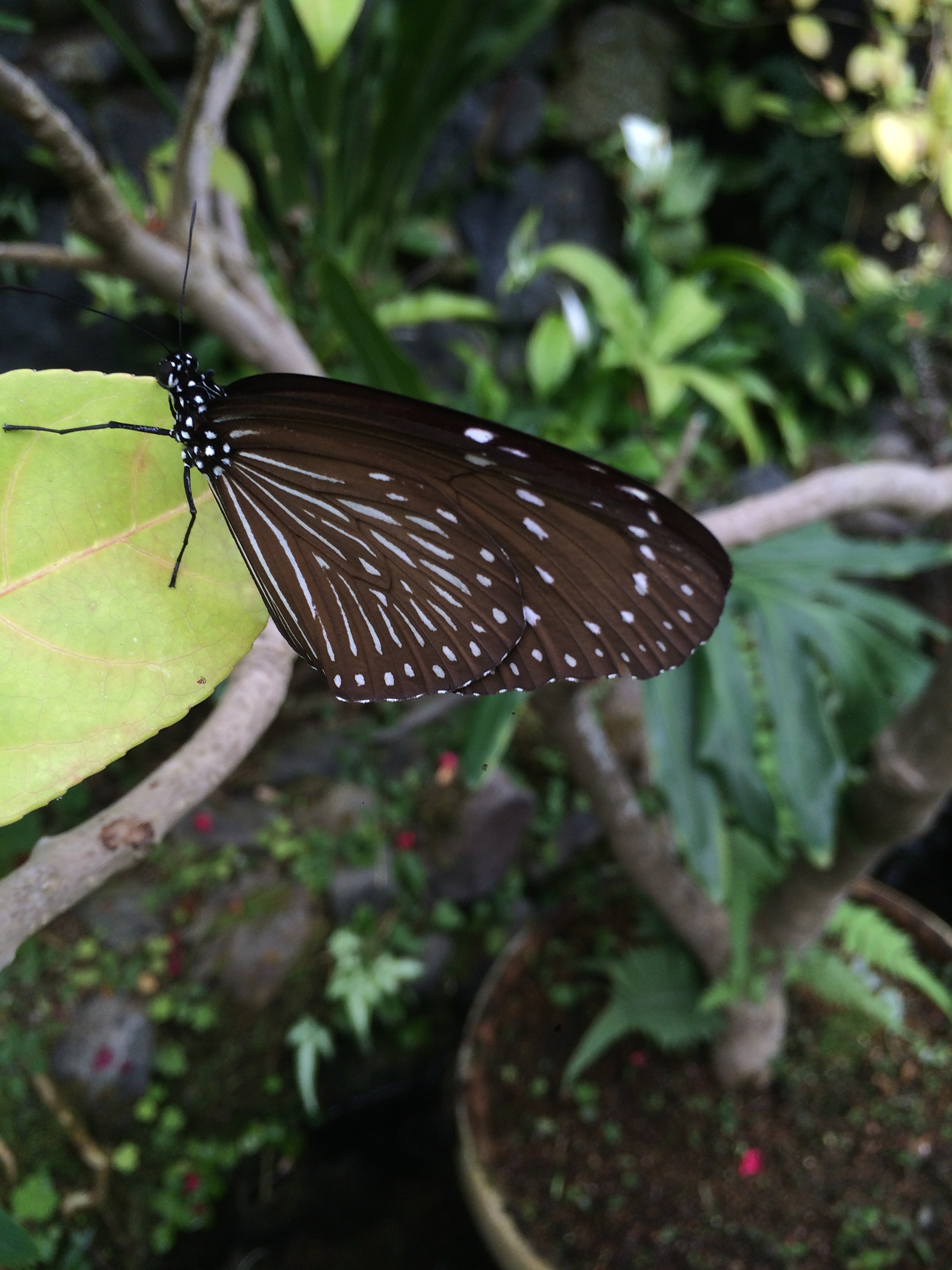
Euploea mulciber (female)

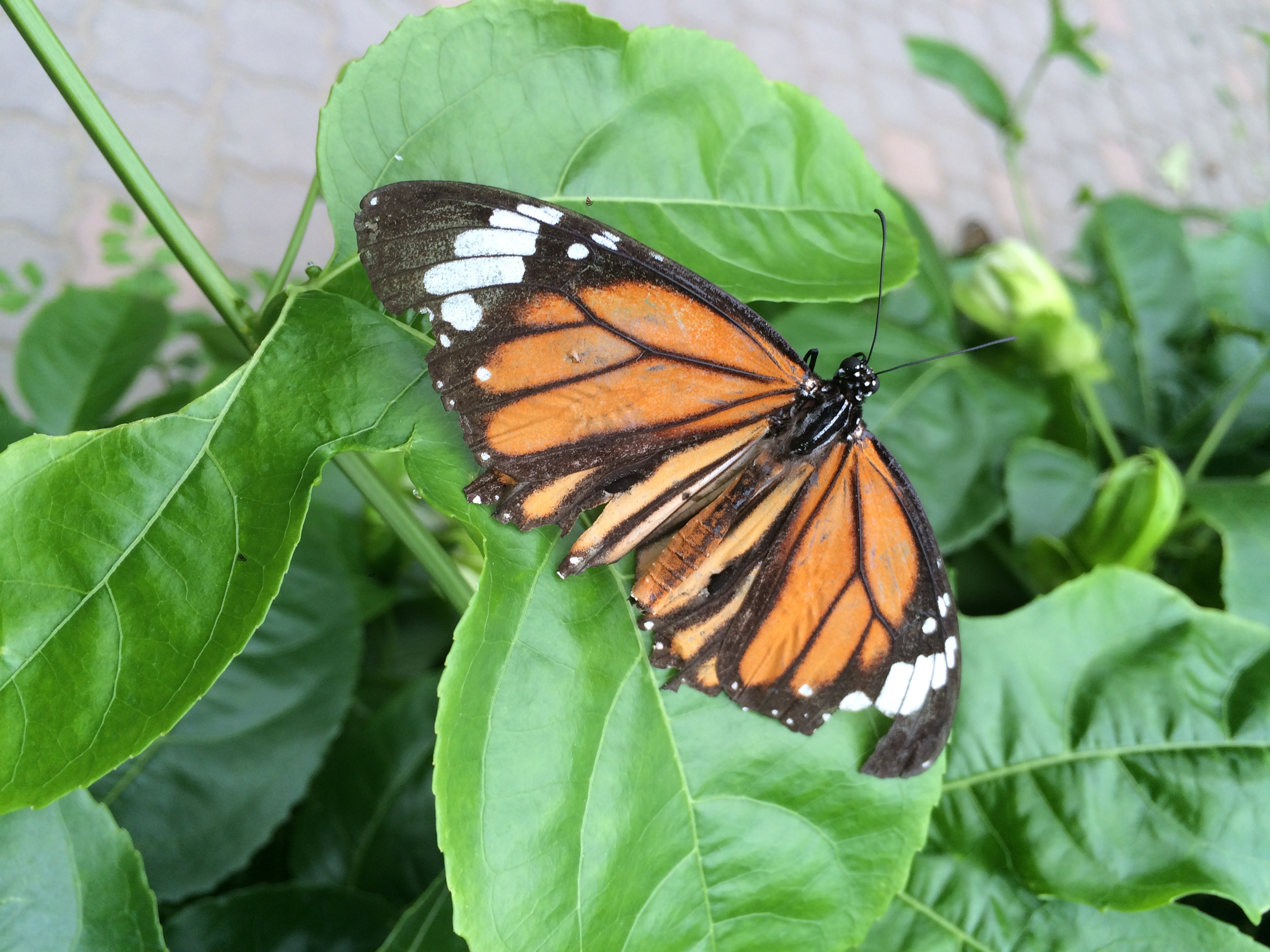
Salatura genutia (male)

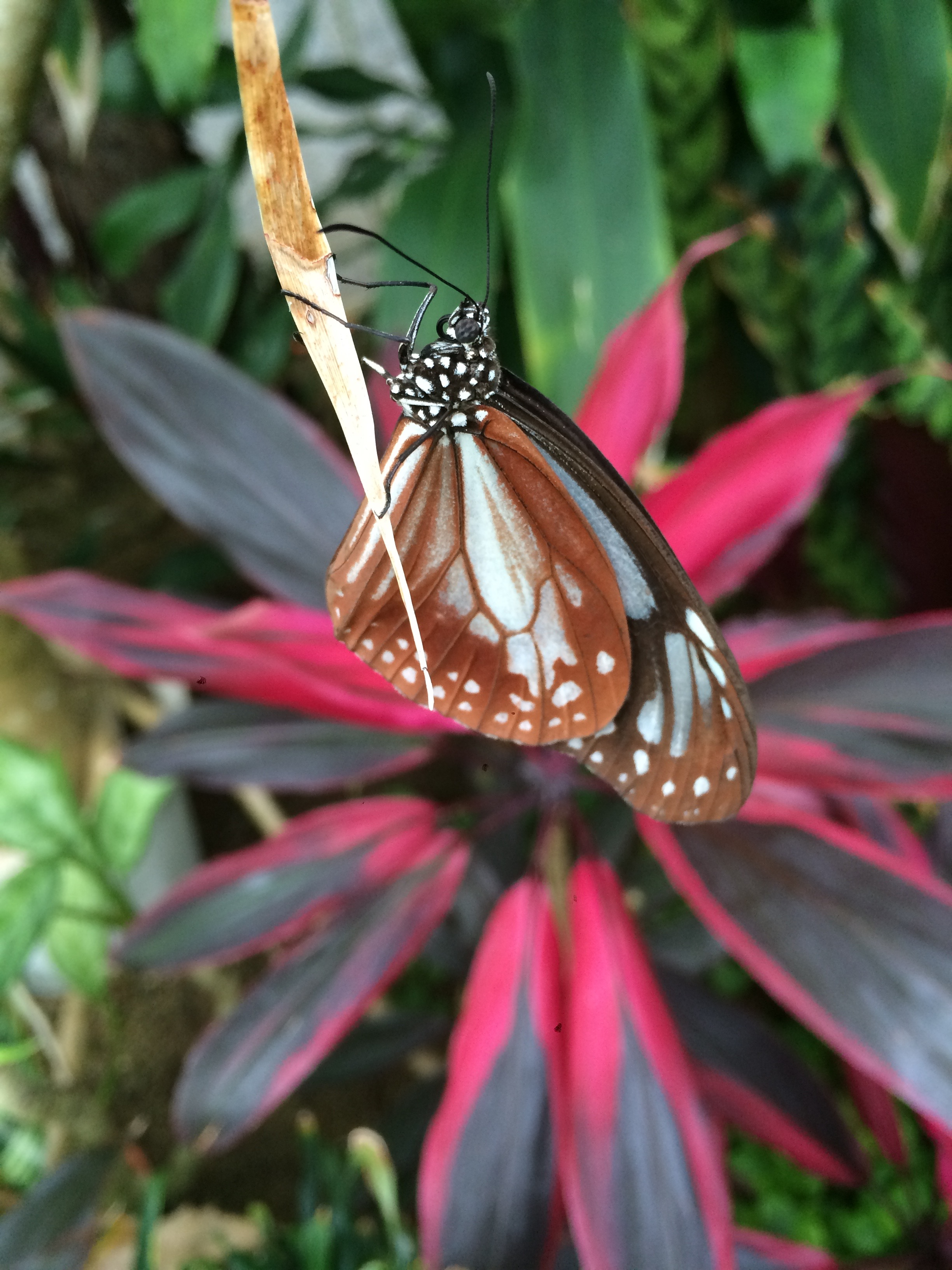
Parantica sita (female)

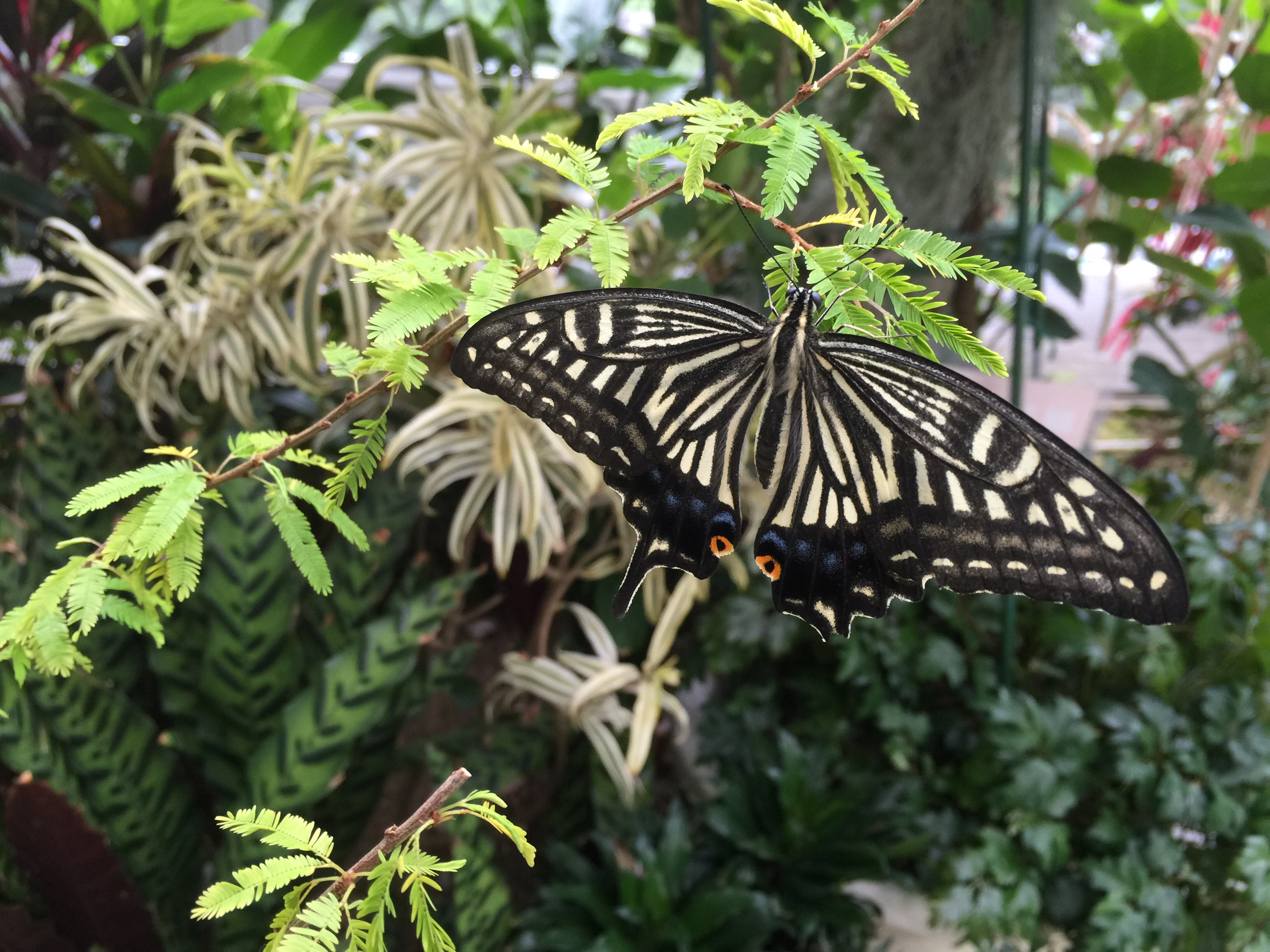
Papilio xuthus

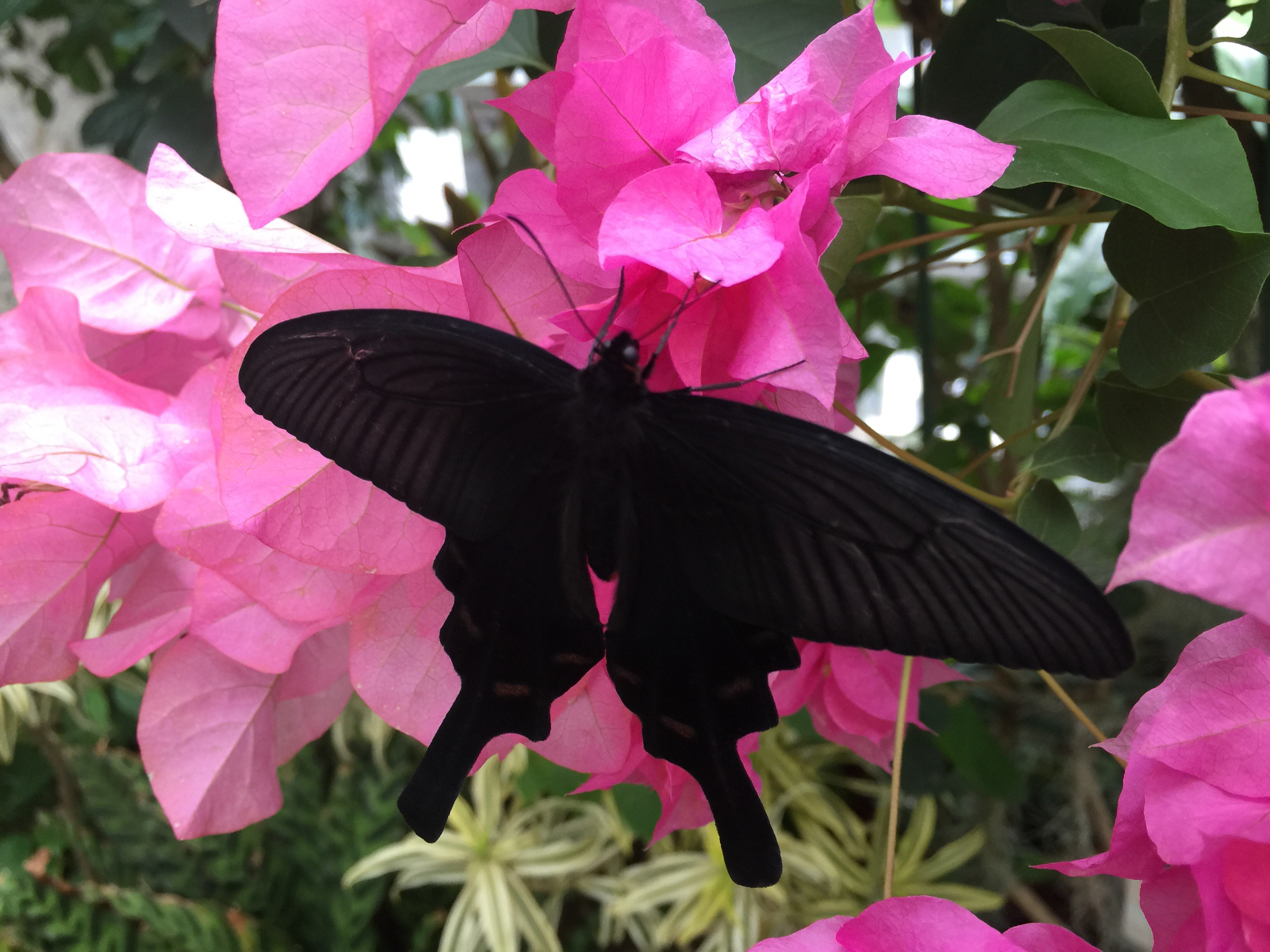
Byasa alcinous (male)

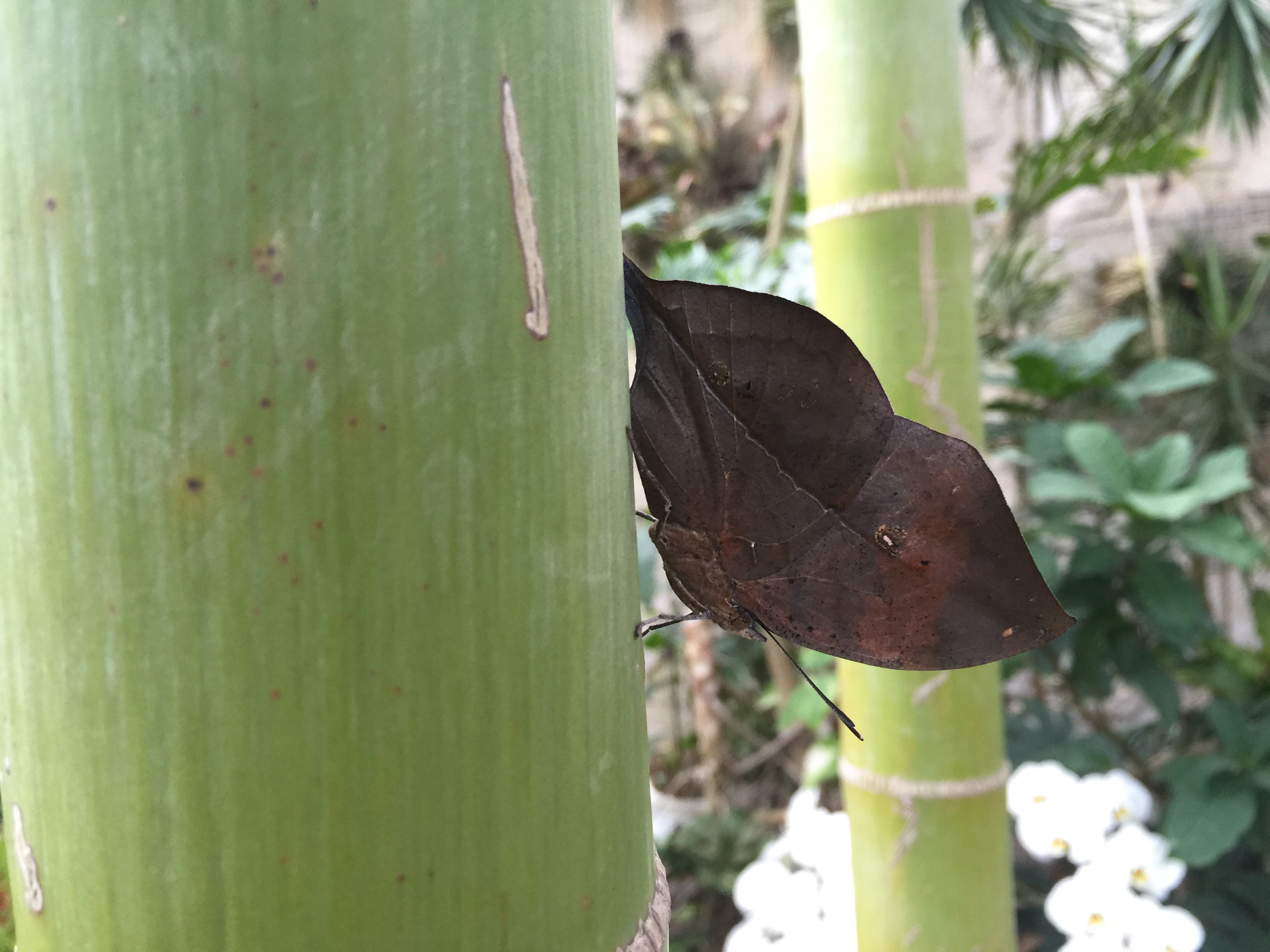
Kallima inachus

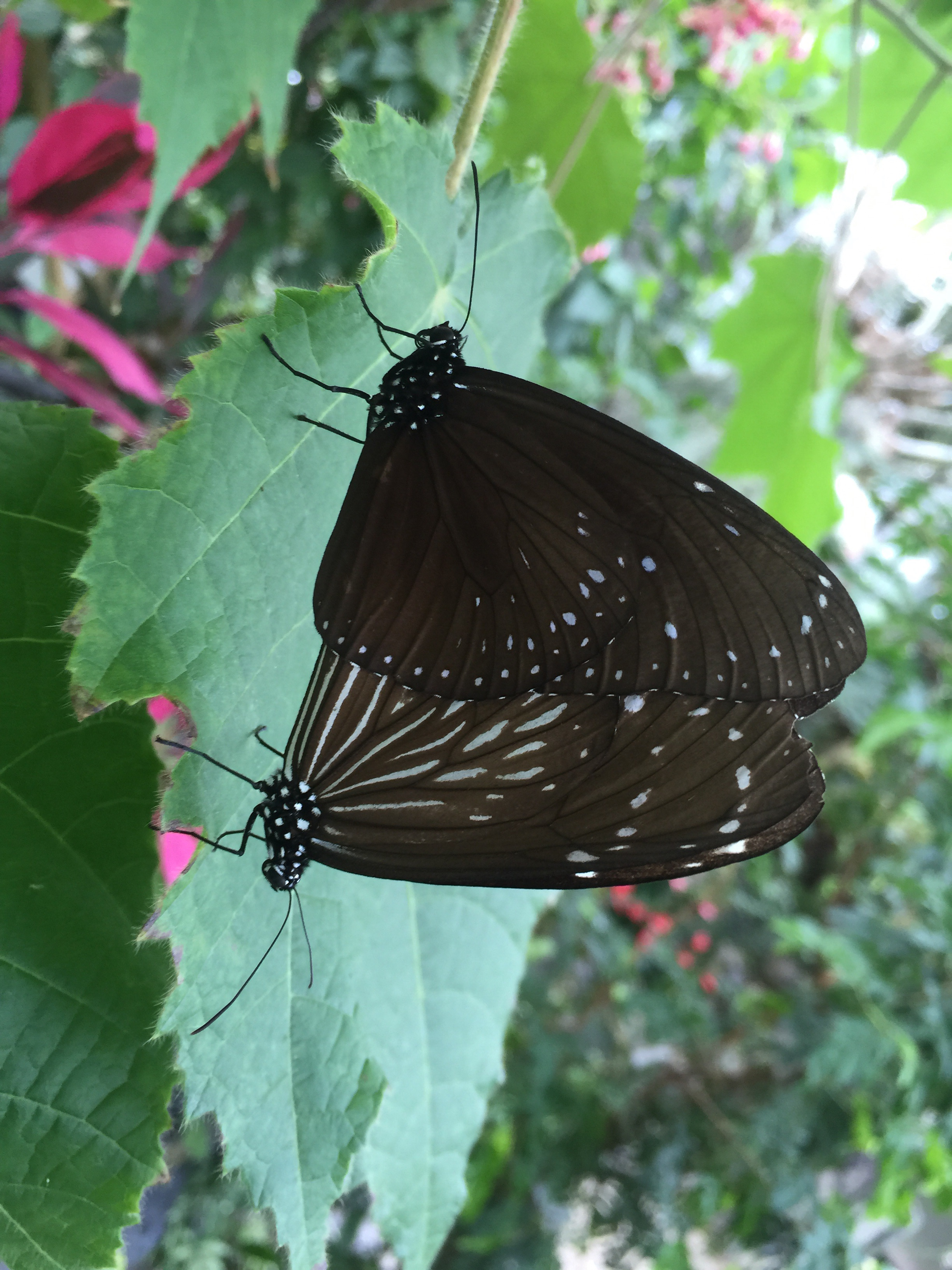
Euploea mulciber (breeding)

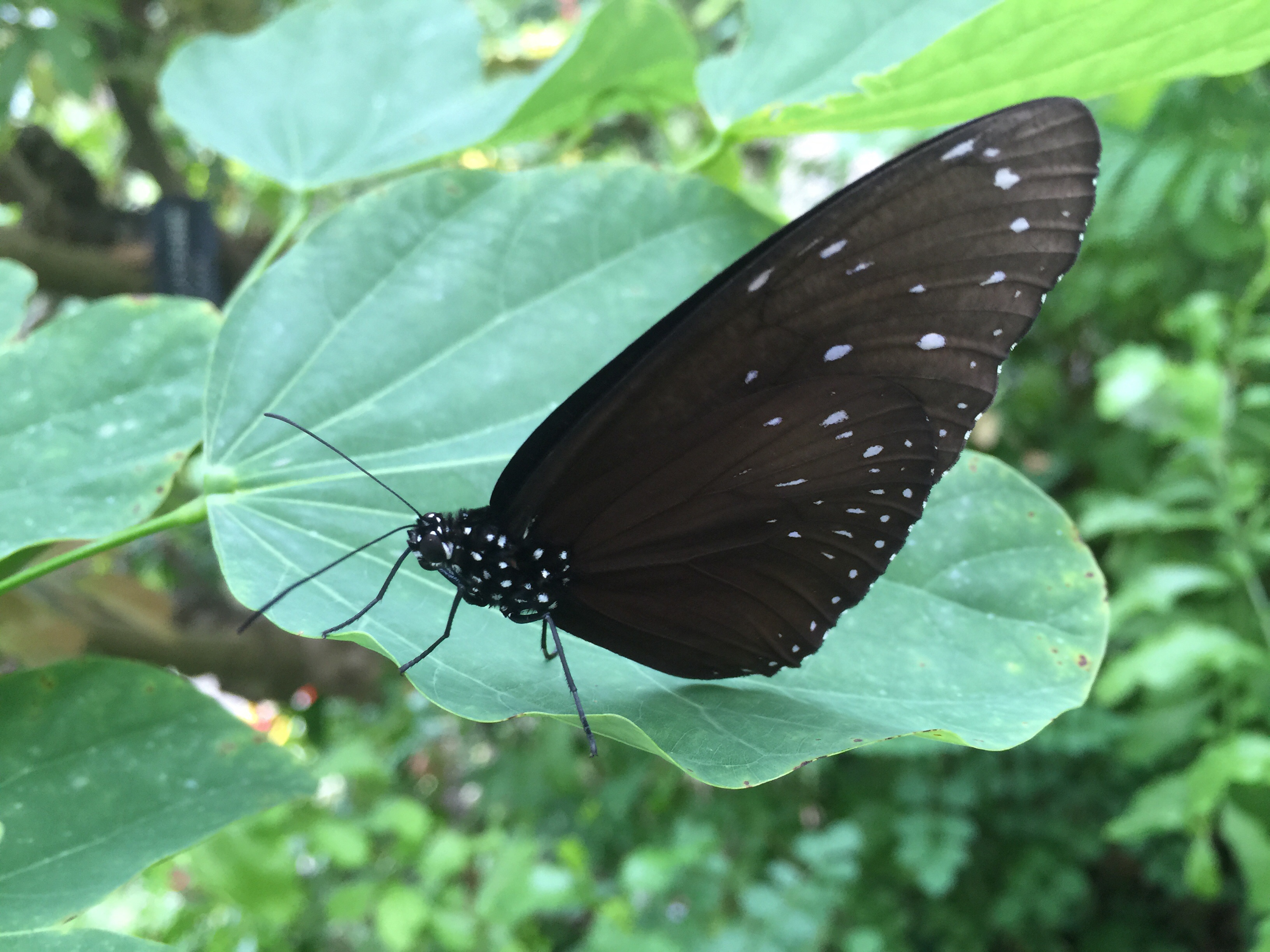
Euploea mulciber (male)

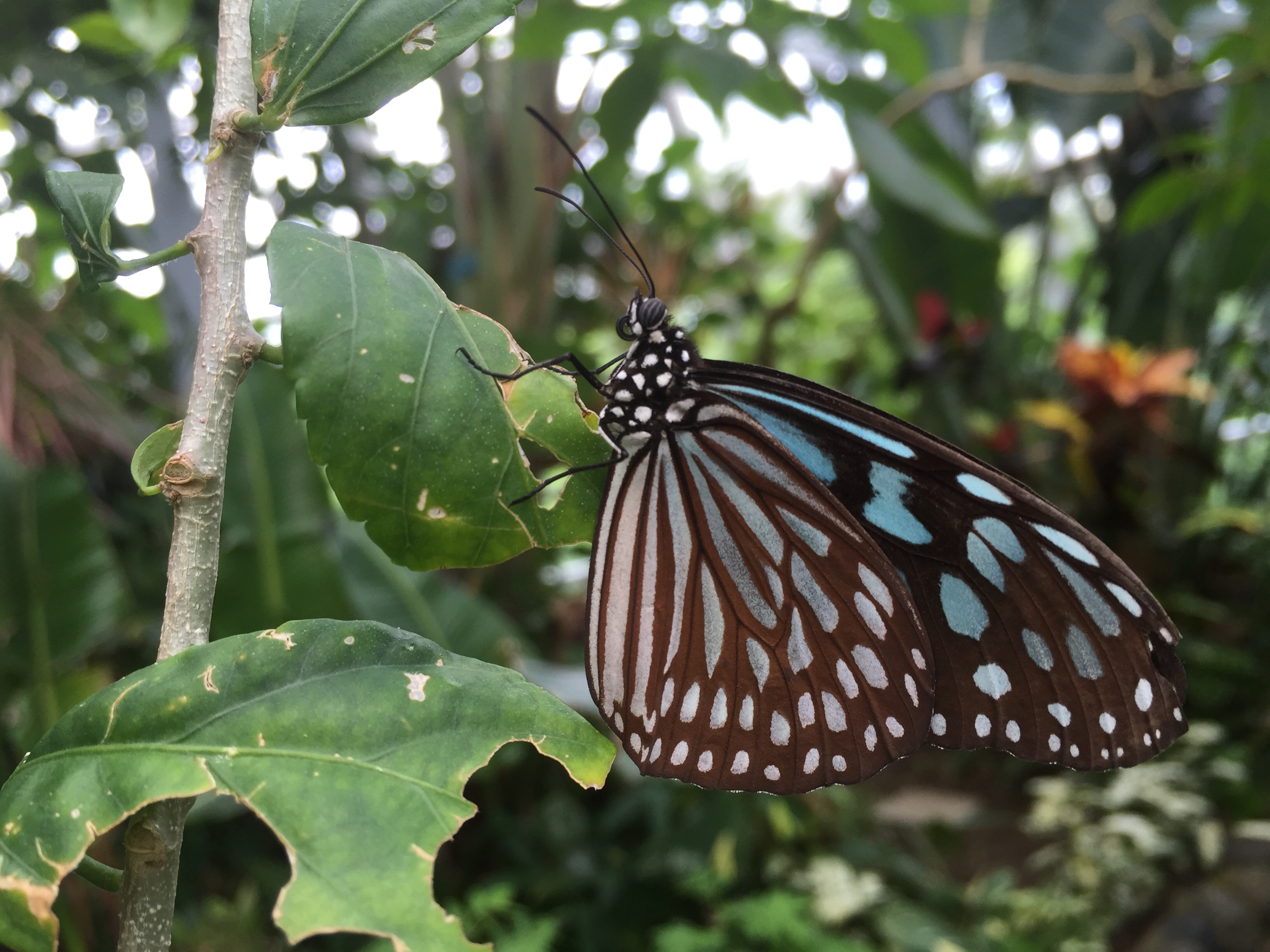
Ideopsis similis
