= Tsukaguchi Station (Hankyu) =

Railway station in Amagasaki, Hyōgo Prefecture, Japan

Tsukaguchi Station 塚口駅
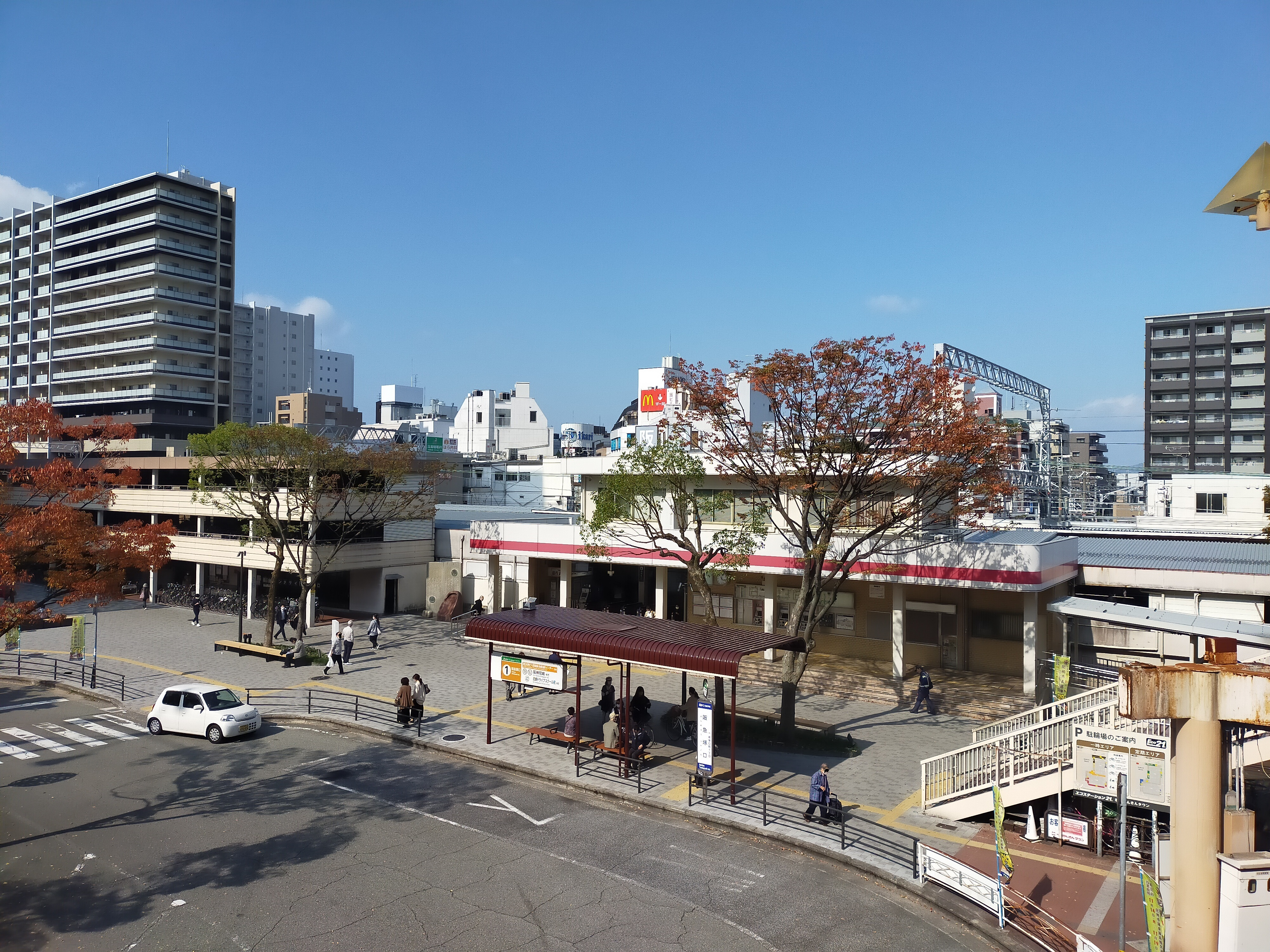
- South side of the station, October 2022

General information
- Location: Tsukaguchi-Hommachi Itchome, Amagasaki-shi, Hyōgo-ken; Japan
- Coordinates: 34°45′9.95″N 135°24′57.14″E
- Operator: Hankyu Railway
- Line: ■ Kōbe Main Line ■ Itami Line
- Platforms: 1 island + 1 side platform
- Tracks: 3
- Connections: Bus terminal

Other information
- Status: Staffed
- Station code: HK-06
- Website: Official website

History
- Opened: 1 April 1936

Passengers
- FY2020: 45,645

Services
Hankyu Railway Kōbe Main Line (HK 06)
Sonoda (HK 05)	Local	Mukonosō (HK 07)
Jūsō (HK 03)	Semi-Express	Mondo-Yakujin (Imazu Line, HK 23)
Jūsō (HK 03)	Express	Mukonosō (HK 07)
Jūsō (HK 03)	Express	Nishinomiya-Kitaguchi (HK 08)
Jūsō (HK 03)	Semi limited Express	Nishinomiya-Kitaguchi (HK 08)
Jūsō (HK 03)	Morning Commutation Limited Express	Nishinomiya-Kitaguchi (HK 08)
Jūsō (HK 03)	Extra Limited Express "Atago"	Nishinomiya-Kitaguchi (HK 08)
Jūsō (HK 03)	Extra Limited Express "Togetsu"	Mondo-Yakujin (Imazu Line, HK 23)
Jūsō (HK 03)	Extra Express (only running for Umeda on the days of horse racing at Hanshin Racecourse)	Nigawa (Imazu Line, HK 25)
Limited Express: Does not stop at this station
Hankyu Railway Itami Line
Terminus	-	Inano (HK 18)
Location
- Location within Hyōgo Prefecture Location within Japan

Tsukaguchi Station (塚口駅, Tsukaguchi-eki; station number: HK-06) is a passenger railway station located in the city of Amagasaki Hyōgo Prefecture, Japan. It is operated by the private transportation company Hankyu Railway.

== Lines ==
Tsukaguchi Station is served by the Hankyu Kobe Line, and is located 10.2 kilometres (6.3 miles) from the terminus of the line at Osaka-umeda. It is also a terminus of the 3.1 km (1.9 mi) long Hankyū Itami Line to Itami.

== Layout ==
The station consists of one ground-level island platform and one side platform. One side of the island platform (for track 3) is short, and is used by the Itami Line. The platforms are connected by an underground passage.

=== Platforms ===
1	■ Kobe Line	for Kobe (Kobe-sannomiya, Shinkaichi), Nishinomiya-Kitaguchi, Takarazuka and the Sanyo Railway Main Line (Akashi, Himeji)
2	■ Kobe Line	for Osaka (Umeda), Kyoto, Kita-Senri and Minoo
3	■ Itami Line	for Itami

== History ==
The station opened on 1 April 1936.

Station numbering was introduced on 21 December 2013, with Tsukaguchi being designated as station number HK-06.

== Passenger statistics ==
In fiscal 2019, the station was used by an average of 45,645 passengers daily

== Surrounding area ==
- Tsukaguchi Sun Sun Town shopping center
- Sonoda Women's University
- Sonoda Gakuen Junior and Senior High School
- Amagasaki City Fire Department

== See also ==
- List of railway stations in Japan
