= Itami =

City in Hyōgo Prefecture, Kansai, Japan

Itami 伊丹市
- City
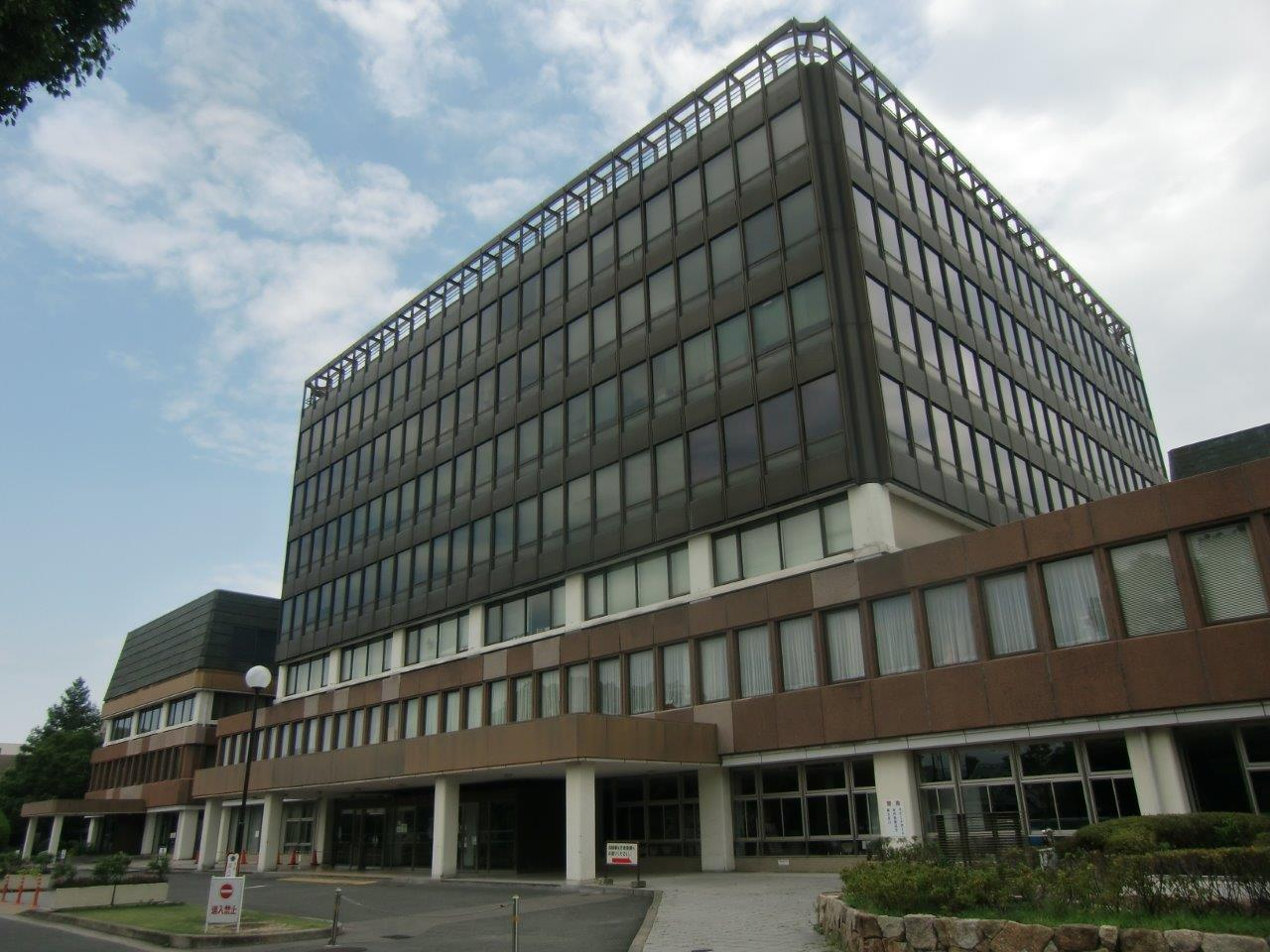
- Itami City Hall

- Flag Chapter

- Location of Itami in Hyōgo Prefecture

- Location in Japan
- Coordinates: 34°47′N 135°24′E
- Country: Japan
- Region: Kansai
- Prefecture: Hyōgo

Government
  - Mayor: Shinya Nakata (中田慎也) (from April 2025)

Area
  - Total: 25.00 km^{2} (9.65 sq mi)

Population (1 November 2022)
  - Total: 197,215
  - Density: 7,889/km^{2} (20,430/sq mi)
- Time zone: UTC+09:00 (JST)
- City hall address: 1-1 Senzo, Itami-shi, Hyōgo-ken 664-8503
- Website: Official website
- Symbols
- Bird: Mallard (male)
- Flower: Azalea

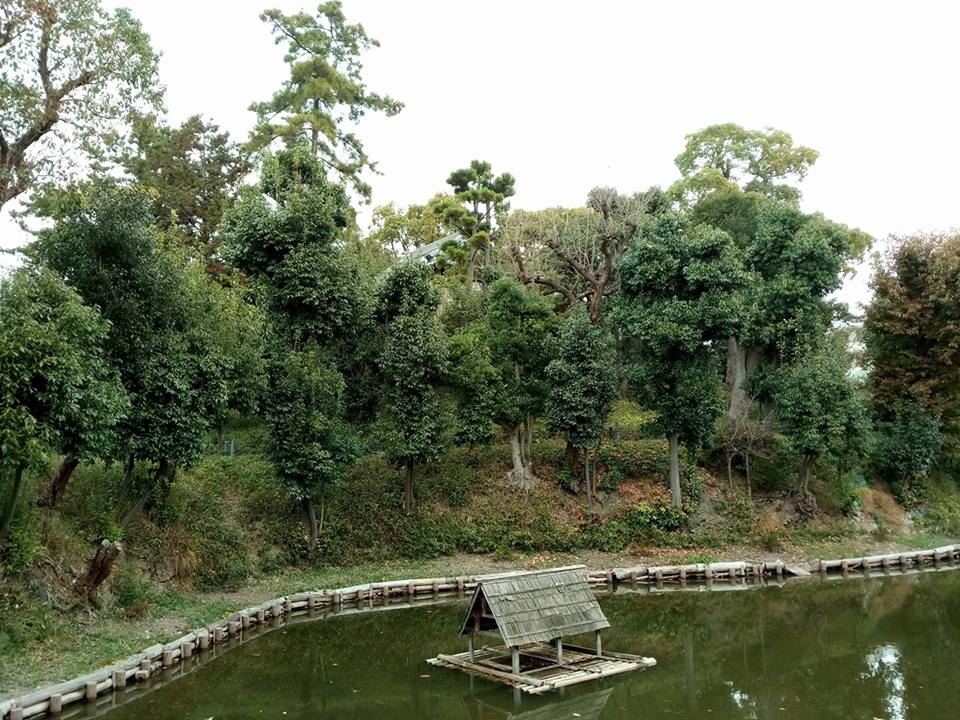
Gogadzuka Kofun

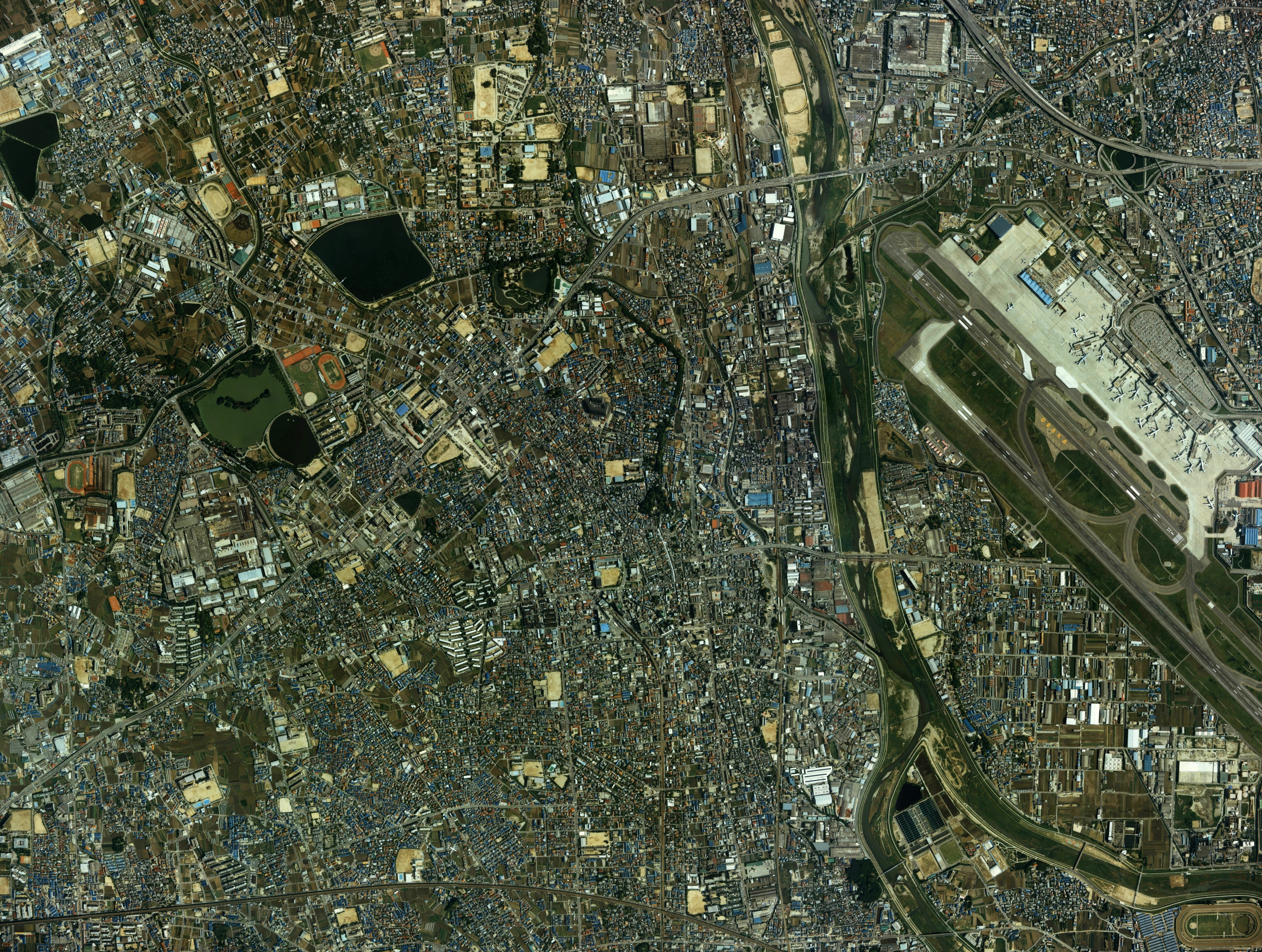
Aerial view of Itami city center

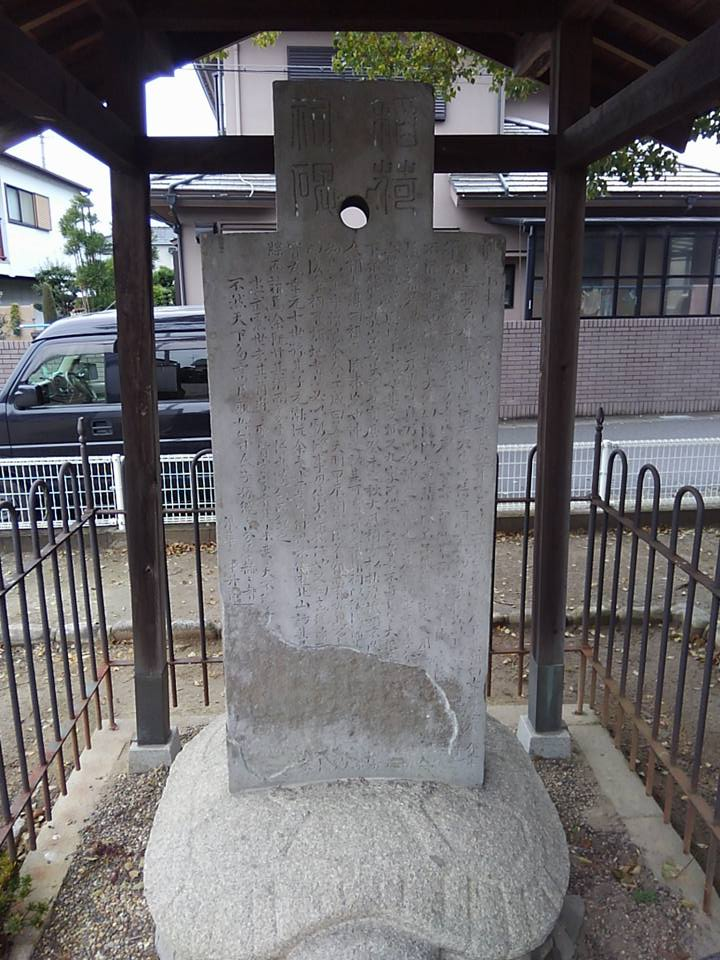
Konoike inari shihi

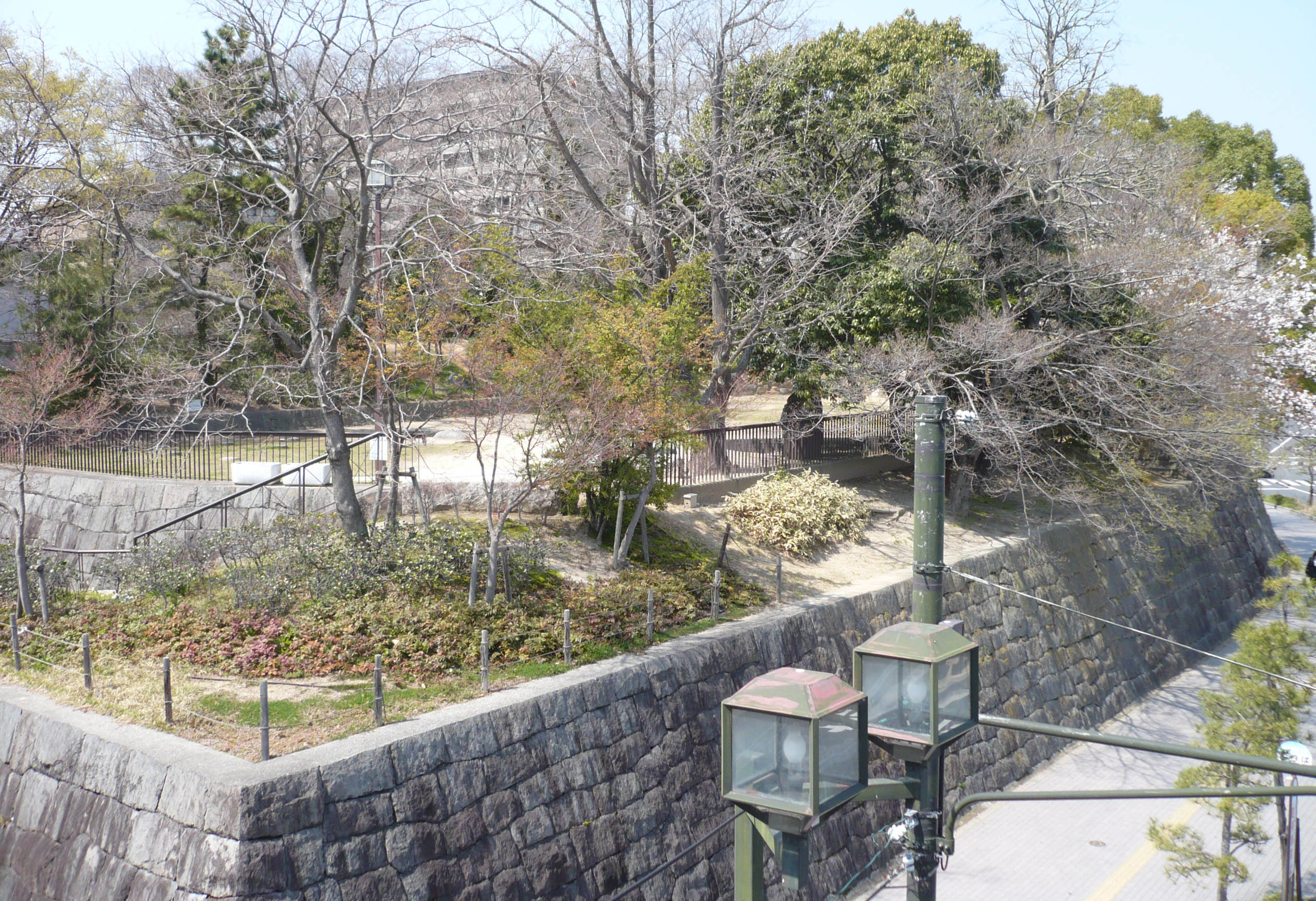
Arioka Castle ruins

Itami (伊丹市, Itami-shi; Japanese pronunciation: [í.tä̀.mʲì, ì.tä́.mʲí.ɕì]) is a city located in Hyōgo Prefecture, Japan. As of 1 November 2022, the city had an estimated population of 197,215 in 83,580 households and a population density of 7,900/km^{2} (20,000/sq mi). The total area of the city is 25.00 square kilometres (9.65 sq mi).

== Geography ==
Itami is located in south-eastern Hyōgo Prefecture, with the Ina River to the east and the Muko River to the west. The city area is a flat, undulating gentle terrain throughout. JR West Japan JR Takarazuka Line (also known as the Fukuchiyama Line) and Hankyū Itami Line traverse north and south. It is roughly 10 km (6.2 mi) from Osaka and contacts Kawanishi in the north, Takarazuka in the northwest, Nishinomiya and Amagasaki in the southwest, and Ikeda and Toyonaka in the east. In Hyōgo prefecture, the population density is the second highest following Amagasaki in the south.

=== Neighboring municipalities ===
Hyōgo Prefecture

- Amagasaki
- Kawanishi
- Nishinomiya
- Takarazuka

Osaka Prefecture

- Ikeda
- Toyonaka

=== Climate ===
Itami has a humid subtropical climate (Köppen Cfa) characterized by warm summers and cool winters with light snowfall. The average annual temperature in Itami is 15.0 °C. The average annual rainfall is 1475 mm with September as the wettest month. The temperatures are highest on average in August, at around 26.9 °C, and lowest in January, at around 3.7 °C.

== Demographics ==
Per Japanese census data, the population of Itami has been increasing steadily since the 1950s.

Historical population
Year	Pop.	±%
1950	59,838	—
1960	86,455	+44.5%
1970	153,736	+77.8%
1980	178,228	+15.9%
1990	186,134	+4.4%
2000	192,159	+3.2%
2010	186,160	−3.1%

== History ==
The area of modern Itami is part of ancient Settsu Province and the hilly area is called the Itami plateau, between the Ina River and the Muko River have been continuously inhabited since the Japanese Paleolithic period. Stone tools, Jomon pottery and Yayoi pottery and settlement traces have been found in several areas within the city limits, and rice cultivation was done in the area from ancient times. The area also has many kofun burial mounds, including the Gogadzuka Kofun (御願塚古墳) and Kashiwagi Kofun, which were built during the Kofun period. The names 'Inano', 'Inabe' and 'Ina Prefecture', all of appear to be variants of 'Itami' appear in the Nihon Shoki and in waka poems from the Nara and Heian periods. In the northern part of the city, the Itami temple ruins date from between the Nara period to the Kamakura period.

The center of Itami became a wealthy castle town by the middle of Sengoku period with the construction of Arioka Castle, held by Araki Murashige ruled under Oda Nobunaga. After the uprising and defeat of Araki, the castle was torn down. During the Edo Period, the town was taken over by the Konoe family of court nobility, and the sake brewing industry prospered under its protection.

Following the Meiji restoration, the holdings of the Konoe family were incorporated into Hyōgo Prefecture. The town of Itami was established 1 April 1889 with the creation of the modern municipalities system. Itami was raised to city status on 10 November 1940. Great portions of the city were damaged in the Great Hanshin–Awaji earthquake of 1995, but were quickly rebuilt.

== Government ==
Itami has a mayor-council form of government with a directly elected mayor and a unicameral city council of 28 members. Itami contributes three members to the Hyōgo Prefectural Assembly. In terms of national politics, the city is in the Hyōgo 6th districts of the lower house of the Diet of Japan.

== Economy ==
Together with the adjacent Yamamoto district of Takarazuka, the horticultural industry in Itami is one of the three major plant production areas in Japan. The cherry trees planted along the Potomac River in the United States were grown using Itami cherry trees as rootstocks. The city has a mixed economy of commerce, industry and is also a commuter town for Osaka.

=== Industry ===
The history of sake brewing in Itami is very old, having been done since the Muromachi period. In the Itami area, a method of brewing clear and colorless Japanese rice wine, now known as sake, was discovered. In the Edo period, the sake brewed in Itami was popular. Sake remains a significant contributor to the local economy.

== Education ==
Itami has 17 public elementary schools and eight public middle schools operated by the city government, and five public high schools operated by the Hyōgo Prefectural Board of Education. In addition, the city also operates one and the prefecture operates two special education school for the handicapped. The Otemae College, a junior college, is located in the city.

There is a North Korean school in Itami: Itami Korean Elementary School (伊丹朝鮮初級学校).

== Transportation ==
=== Airports ===
Most of Osaka International Airport is located in Itami (hence its common name "Itami Airport"); it is Osaka's primary domestic airport, after all international flights and some domestic flights shifted to Kansai International Airport in 1994. Despite the airport's association with Itami, the terminal complex is located in the neighboring city of Toyonaka and the Itami city center is connected to the airport only by a long tunnel that passes beneath the runway and tarmac.

=== Railways ===
JR West - Fukuchiyama Line

- Itami - Kita-Itami

Hankyu - Itami Line

- Inano - Shin-Itami - Itami

Osaka Monorail - Nissei Line

- Osaka Airport

=== Bus ===
- Itami City Bus

=== Highways ===
- Meishin Expressway
- Chūgoku Expressway
- Hanshin Expressway
  - National Route 171
  - National Route 176

== Sister cities ==
- Hasselt, Belgium
- Foshan, China

== Local attractions ==
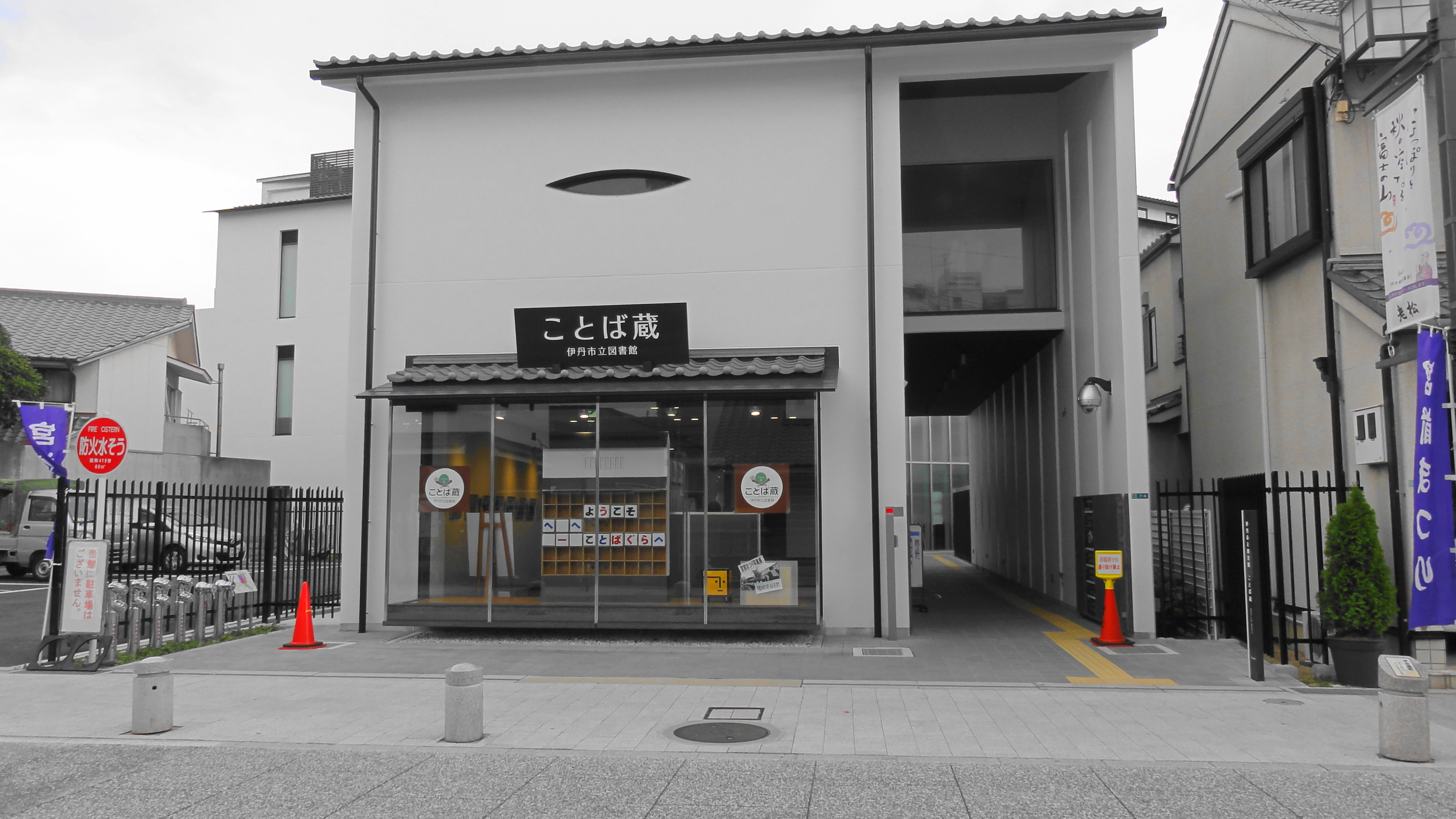
Itami City Library (伊丹市立図書館)

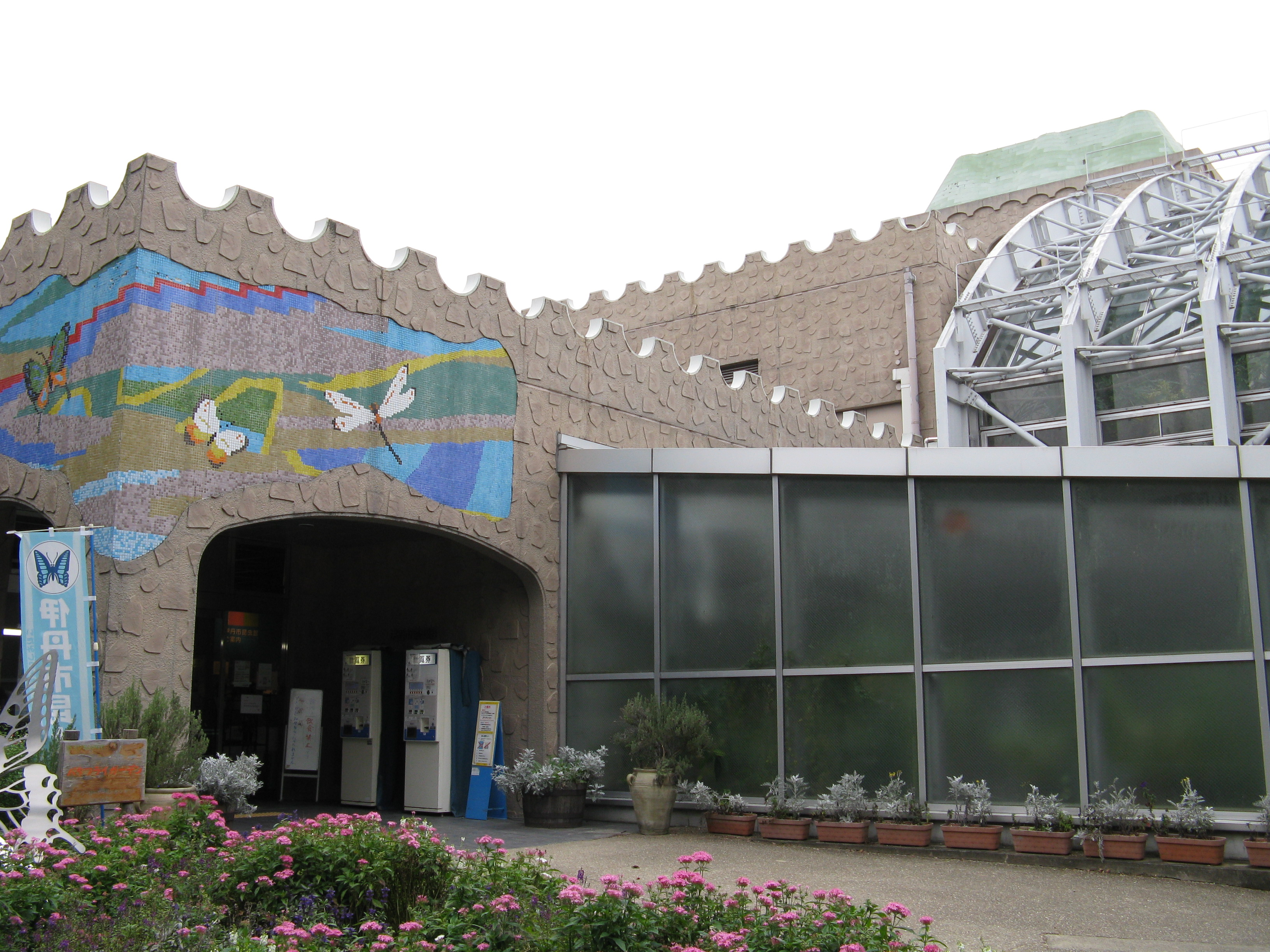
Itami City Museum of Insects

- Aramaki rose park (荒牧バラ公園)
- Arioka Castle Ruins (有岡城址)
- Gogadzuka Kofun (御願塚古墳), a kofun from the Kofun period
- Inano Shrine (猪名野神社)
- Itami City Library (伊丹市立図書館)
- Itami City Museum of Art (伊丹市立美術館)
- Itami City Museum of Insects (伊丹市昆虫館)
- Itami Sky Park (伊丹スカイパーク)
- Kakimori Bunko (柿衞文庫), which claims to be one of the three museums in the world housing major collections of haiku poetry and painting; it houses the Kakimori Collection, a poetry collection of haikai.
- Koya temple (昆陽寺)
- Koyoike Park (昆陽池公園)
- Miyamena Cultural Towns Itami-shi Itami-cho Town Pavilion, Town Old Okada Family with Sake Brewery (Important Cultural Property of the Country) (みやのまえ文化の郷)

=== Culture and regular events ===
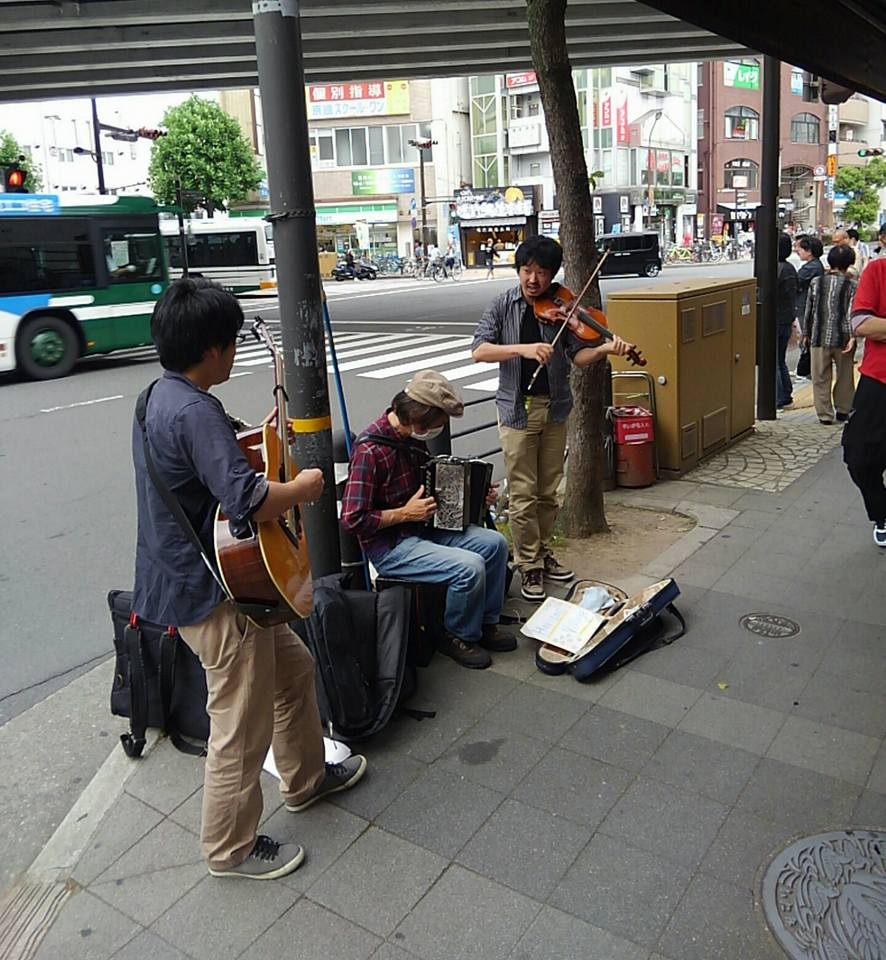
Itami Machinakanaka Bar on-street performance

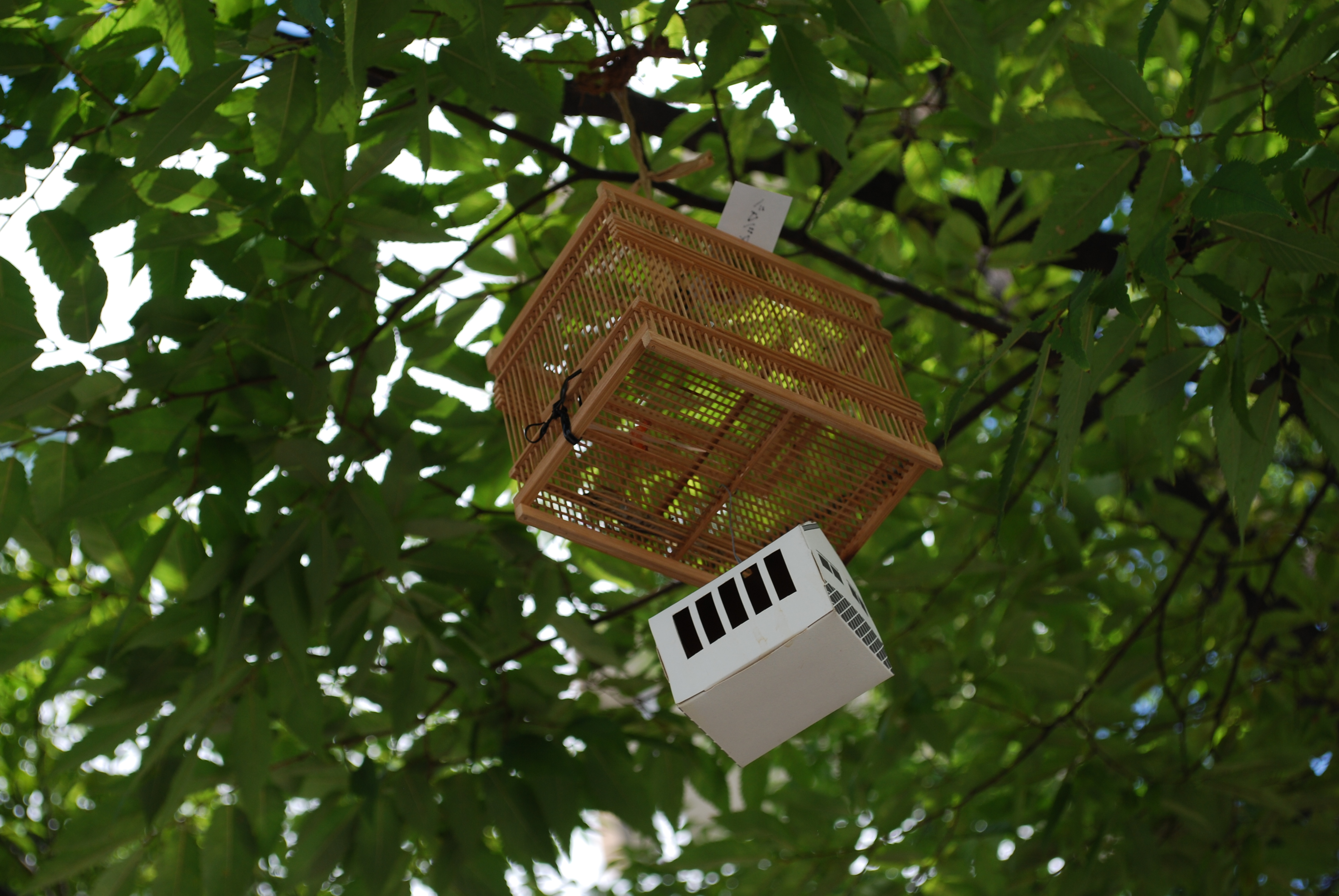
Insect basket suspended in the street tree

- Itami Machinakanaka Bar is an eating and drinking event in the city center of Itami. It held twice a year, in spring and autumn, and musicians can often be found performing in the streets during the event.
- Nakumushi to Go-cho is a Japanese poetry event in autumn. In the Itami city center, the "insect hearing" event is held every September. At this event, various events related to "insect hearing" occur—such as music concerts, study sessions, reading books, and workshops—over the course of a few weeks.

== Notable people from Itami ==
- Uejima Onitsura (1661–1738), Japanese haiku poet of the Edo period
- Yoko Minamino (1967–), Japanese actress and singer
- Masami Okui (1968–), Japanese singer-songwriter
- Akira Ueda (1970–), Japanese video game designer and founder of Audio, Inc.
- Aiko Uemura (1979–), Japanese mogul skier
- Hiroyuki Nakajima (1982–), Japanese professional baseball player
- Katsuki Yamazaki (1982–), Japanese professional baseball player
- Masahiro Tanaka (1988–), Japanese professional baseball player
- Hayato Sakamoto (1988–), Japanese professional baseball player
- Kasumi Arimura (1993–), Japanese actress
- Matsuri Arai (2001–), Japanese diver
