= Itami Station (Hankyu) =

Railway station in Itami, Hyōgo Prefecture, Japan

Coordinates: 34°46′47.52″N 135°24′49.02″E

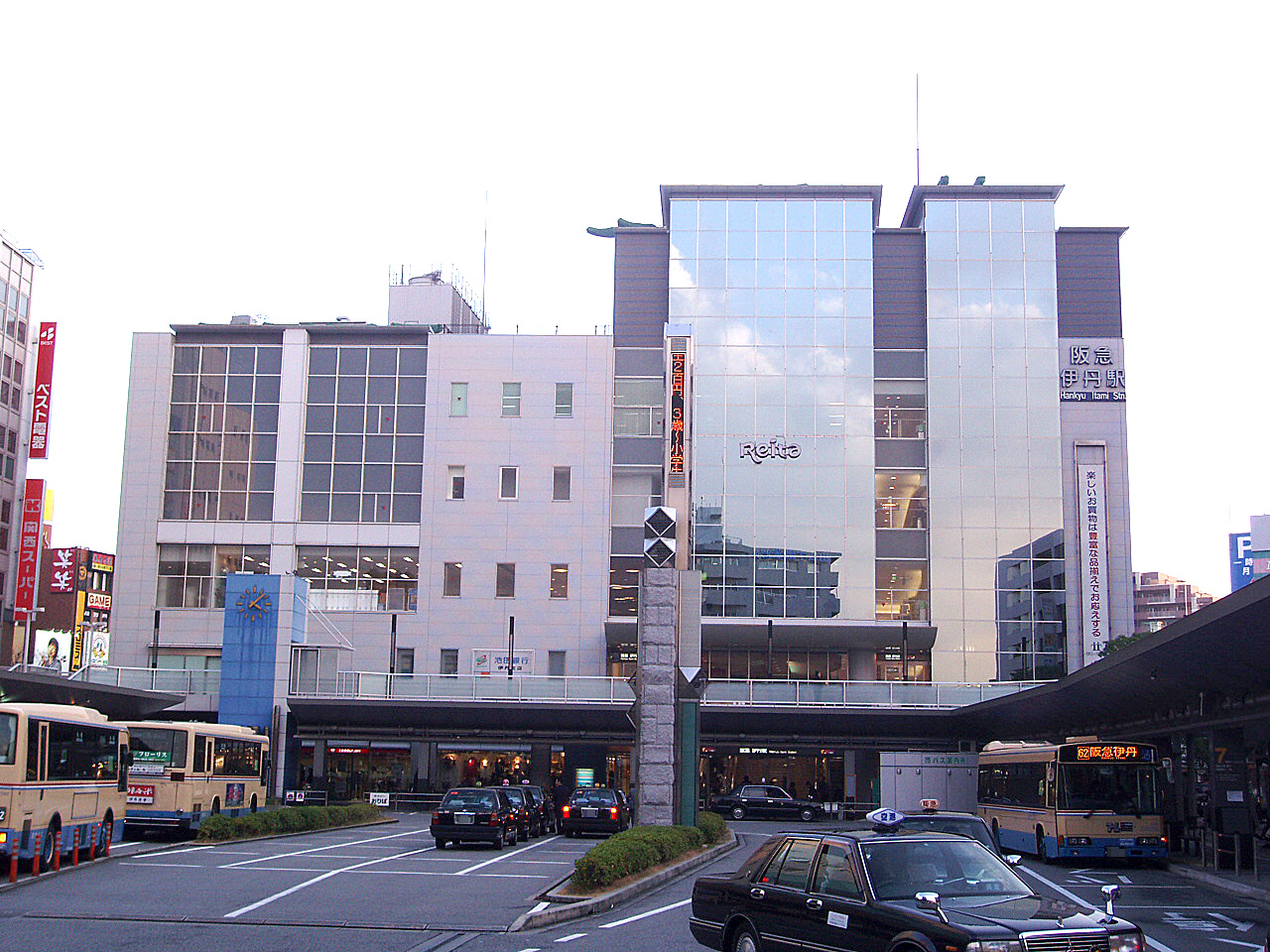
Station building

Itami Station (伊丹駅, Itami-eki) is a train station in Itami, Hyōgo Prefecture, Japan that serves as the northern terminus of the Itami Line.

== History ==
The station opened in 1920 at street level on a site approximately 150 meters southeast of its present location, and relocated to its present elevated site in 1968.

The station was severely damaged by the Great Hanshin earthquake in January 1995, and ceased operations until March, when a temporary terminal opened 400m away. The 1968 station site was redeveloped as the "Reita" complex, and the station moved back to its original location in November 1998.

In 2007, Hyogo Prefecture announced plans to connect the station to JR Itami Station and Itami Airport via a light rail system, but funds have yet to be committed to the project.

== Lines ==
- Hankyu Railway
  - Itami Line

== Adjacent stations ==
Preceding station	Hankyu Railway	Following station
Shin-Itami towards Tsukaguchi	Itami Line	Terminus
