= Hanshin Industrial Region =

Industrial region of Japan

The Hanshin Industrial Region (阪神工業地帯, Hanshin Kōgyō Chitai) is one of the largest industrial regions in Japan. Its name comes from the on-reading of the kanji used to abbreviate the names of Osaka (大阪) and Kobe (神戸), the two largest cities in the megalopolis. The GDP of this area (Osaka and Kobe) is $341 billion, one of the world's most productive regions. 2014 Osaka and Kobe's GDP per capita (PPP) was US$35,902.

== Statistics ==
Prefecture	Ōsaka Prefecture	Hyōgo Prefecture
Capital	Ōsaka	Kōbe
Establishments	24,822	11,300
Employees	530,407	359,850
Manuf. goods shipments	¥15,961 billion	¥12,945 billion
Value added	¥6,459 billion	¥4,808 billion

(4-digit industrial subclassification)

== Main cities and industries ==
=== Ōsaka Prefecture ===
==== Osaka: medical, chemical, metal ====
Facilities:

- Rohto Pharmaceutical
- Daiichi Sankyo
- Takeda Pharmaceutical Company
- Sumitomo Chemical
- Sumitomo Electric Industries
- Sharp
- Kansai Paint
- Kansai Electric Power Company

Laboratories, research institutes:

- Rohto Pharmaceutical
- Shionogi Pharmaceutical
- Mitsubishi Tanabe Pharma
- Sumitomo Pharmaceutical
- Sumitomo Chemical

==== Sakai: chemical, metal ====
Facilities:

- ExxonMobil
- Showa Denko
- Ube Industries
- Nippon Oil
- Esso
- Bayer (polyurethane)
- Nippon Steel & Sumitomo Metal
- Mitsui Chemicals
- Mitsubishi Materials
- Osaka Gas

- Daikin Industries

- Air conditioning and chemicals, especially fluorine; has major market share with DuPont.

Laboratories, research institutes:

- Showa Denko
- Sakai Chemical Industry (titanium dioxide, stabilizers & metallic soaps)
- Kyowa (medical)

==== Kadoma, Moriguchi, Daito: electronics ====
Facilities: and research institutes:

- Matsushita Electric Industrial (Panasonic): the headquarters
- Sanyo: the headquarters
- Funai: the headquarters

==== Other cities in Osaka prefecture ====
Facilities:

- Kinki Sharyo in Higashiōsaka (manufacturer of railroad vehicles)
- Sunstar in Takatsuki (manufacture and sales of oral care products): the headquarters
- Daihatsu in Ikeda (cars), the headquarters
- Nitto Denko

- A chemical company, specializing in reverse osmosis membrane (a market shared with Dow Chemical Company)

Laboratories, research institutes:

- Nippon Shokubai in Suita (manufacture of catalyst)
- JT (Japan Tobacco) in Takatsuki (medical laboratory)
- Osaka Bioscience Institute in Suita (a national science research institute established by the Ministry of Science and Technology )

=== Hyōgo Prefecture ===
==== Amagasaki: chemical, metal, electronics ====
Facilities:

- Sumitomo Metal Industries
- Mitsui Chemicals
- Matsushita Electric Industrial (Panasonic)

- Plasma display

- Asahi Glass Co.
- Sekisui Chemical

- Mitsubishi Electric

- Railroad traffic control system, electric power control system, air traffic control system, Doppler radar, communications satellite, Global Positioning System.

- Osaka Titanium Technologies

- Titanium products (about 20% share of the world market)

Laboratories, research institutes:

- Bayer

- Urethane, polyurethane raw materials

- Mitsubishi Electric

- The largest laboratory of Mitsubishi Electric
- Electric devices and electronics

==== Kobe: medical, electronics, heavy industries ====
Facilities:

- Mitsubishi Heavy Industries

- Shipbuilding, marine structures
- container ships, submarines, research vessels and vehicles, nuclear reactors, satellites.

- Kawasaki Heavy Industries

- Shipbuilding, marine structures, trains

- Kobe Steel
- Mitsubishi Electric
- Matsushita Electric Industrial (Panasonic)
- Komatsu (manufactures construction, mining, and military equipment)

Laboratories, research institutes:

- Bayer Kobe Research Center
- Eli Lilly and Company
- Boehringer Ingelheim
- Procter & Gamble: the East-Asian and Japanese headquarters.
- Kobe Steel
- Mitsubishi Electric
- RIKEN, a public corporation funded by the government; natural sciences research institute

- Center for Developmental Biology.
- Next-Generation Supercomputer Center (From 2010).

==== Other cities in Hyōgo Prefecture ====
Facilities:

- Asahi Glass Co. in Takasago
- Caterpillar, Inc. in Akashi
- Fujitsu in Akashi
- Nippon Shokubai in Osaka and Hyogo: catalysts, especially acrylic acid (world share 15%) and super-absorbent polymers (world share 25%)
- Kawasaki Heavy Industries in Akashi: motorcycles
- Kobe Steel in Kakogawa, Takasago
- Nippon Steel in Himeji
- Mitsubishi Heavy Industries in Takasago
- Mitsubishi Electric in Akashi
- Procter & Gamble in Akashi

Laboratories, research institutes:

- Kawasaki Heavy Industries in Akashi
- Kobe Steel in Kakogawa
- Sumitomo Chemical in Takarazuka
- Nippon Shokubai in Himeji: acrylic acid plant

== See also ==
- Kansai Science City
- Keihanshin industrial region
- Osaka-Kobe-Kyoto
