= Tsukaguchi Station =

Tsukaguchi Station (塚口駅) may refer to:

- Tsukaguchi Station (Hankyu)
- Tsukaguchi Station (JR West)
