= Hanshin Amagasaki Kaigan Line =

Former commuter rail line in Japan

The Amagasaki Kaigan Line (尼崎海岸線, Amagasaki Kaigan-sen) was a 1.7-kilometre-long (1.1 mi) commuter rail in Hyōgo Prefecture, Japan owned and operated by Hanshin Electric Railway. The line was closed in 1962.

== History ==
The line connecting Deyashiki and Higashihama opened on April 14, 1929, using 1435mm gauge electrified at 600 VDC.

The section between Takasu and Higashihama closed on April 15, 1960. The remaining section closed on December 1, 1962, for construction of the Second Hanshin National Highway (Route 43).

== Stations ==
Station		Connections	Location
Deyashiki	出屋敷	Hanshin Main Line	Amagasaki
Takasu	高洲		Amagasaki
Higashihama	東浜		Amagasaki

== See also ==
- List of railway lines in Japan
