= Sumitomo Group =

Japanese conglomerate corporation

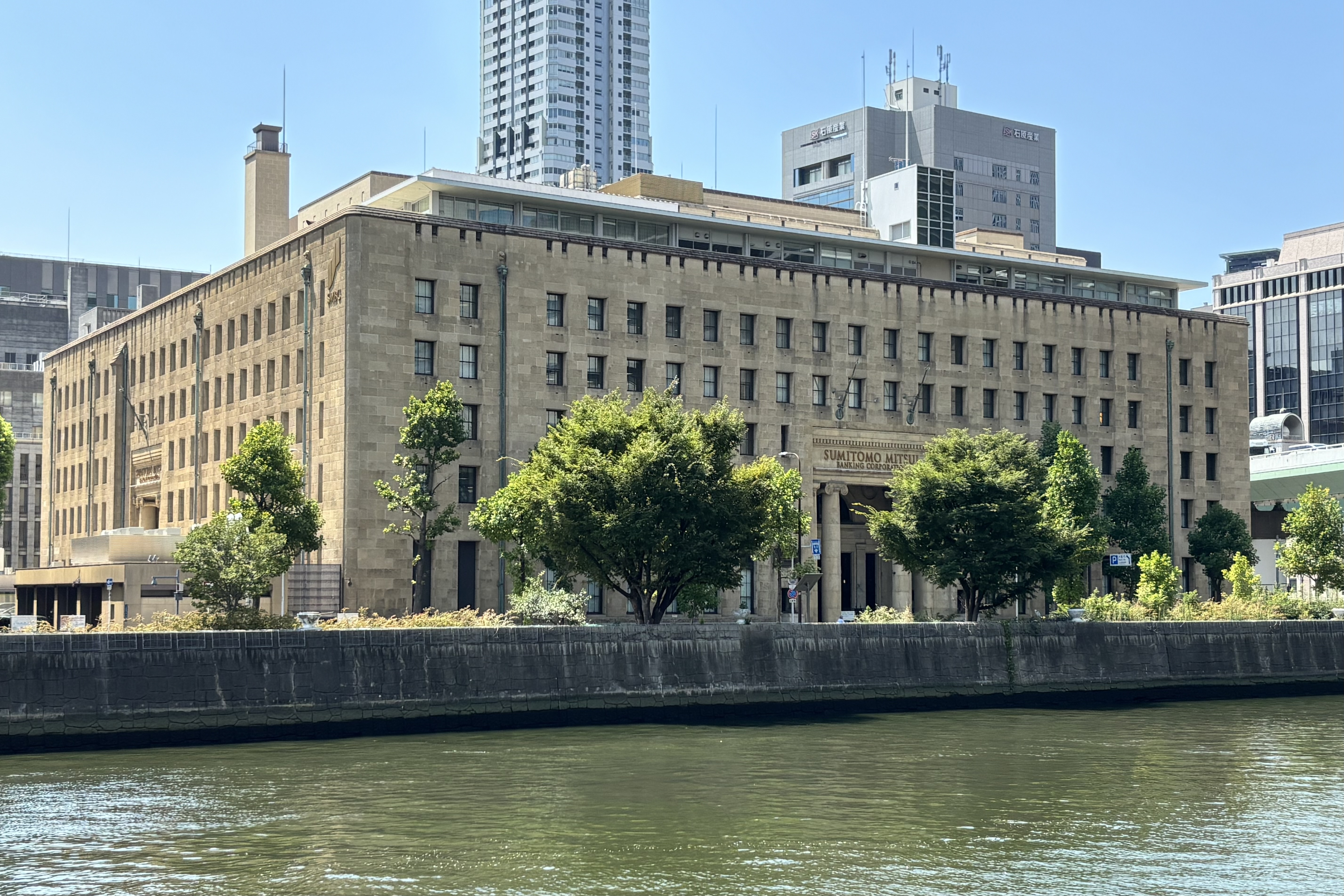
- Sumitomo main building
- Industry: Conglomerate
- Founded: 1590; 436 years ago
- Founders: Sumitomo Masatomo
- Headquarters: Tokyo, Japan
- Products: Current or former Sumitomo Group members
- Number of employees: 632,000
- Website: Sumitomo Group Public Affairs Committee

The Sumitomo Group (Japanese: 住友グループ, Hepburn: Sumitomo Gurūpu) is a group of autonomous Japanese multinational companies.

== History ==
The Sumitomo Group traces its roots to a bookshop in Kyoto founded circa 1590 by Masatomo Sumitomo, a former Buddhist monk. Even today, the corporation is run by his "Founder's Precepts", written in the 17th century.

Copper refining made the company famous. Riemon Soga, Masatomo Sumitomo's brother-in-law, learned Western methods of copper refining. In 1590, he established a smelting business, Izumiya, literally meaning "spring shop". Riemon perfected techniques that allowed the extraction of silver from copper ore, something Japanese technology had not previously accomplished.

The smelting and smithing business was moved from Kyoto to Osaka by the late 17th century. Soga passed control of the company to his son Tomomochi who managed its transformation into a major trading house during the Edo period. Sumitomo began to export copper, import silk, and provide financial services. By 1691, copper mining had been added to the portfolio.

Igeta mark

The Meiji Restoration allowed Sumitomo to import and utilize Western machines and techniques in its mines. Sumitomo soon branched out into even more business areas entering the machine and coal industries, as well as the forestry, banking and warehousing businesses becoming a zaibatsu, or business conglomerate.

After World War II, the Japanese zaibatsu conglomerates, including Sumitomo, were dissolved by the GHQ and the Japanese government. The group reformed as a keiretsu, a group of independent companies organized around The Sumitomo Bank (now Sumitomo Mitsui Banking Corporation) and bound together by cross shareholding.

Many companies continue to use the word Sumitomo in their corporate names. Most of them are managed independently and listed at Tokyo Stock Exchange (TSE) and other stock exchanges with highly dispersed shareholders. For some, the name only shows their historic origin, and they are no longer considered part of the Sumitomo Group.

In 1982, Sumitomo reported an energy conservation program.

=== Emblem ===
The diamond-shaped igeta mark is reminiscent of a type of frame placed over a well in premodern Japan and was the logo of Riemon Soga's Izumiya company.

== Current or former members ==
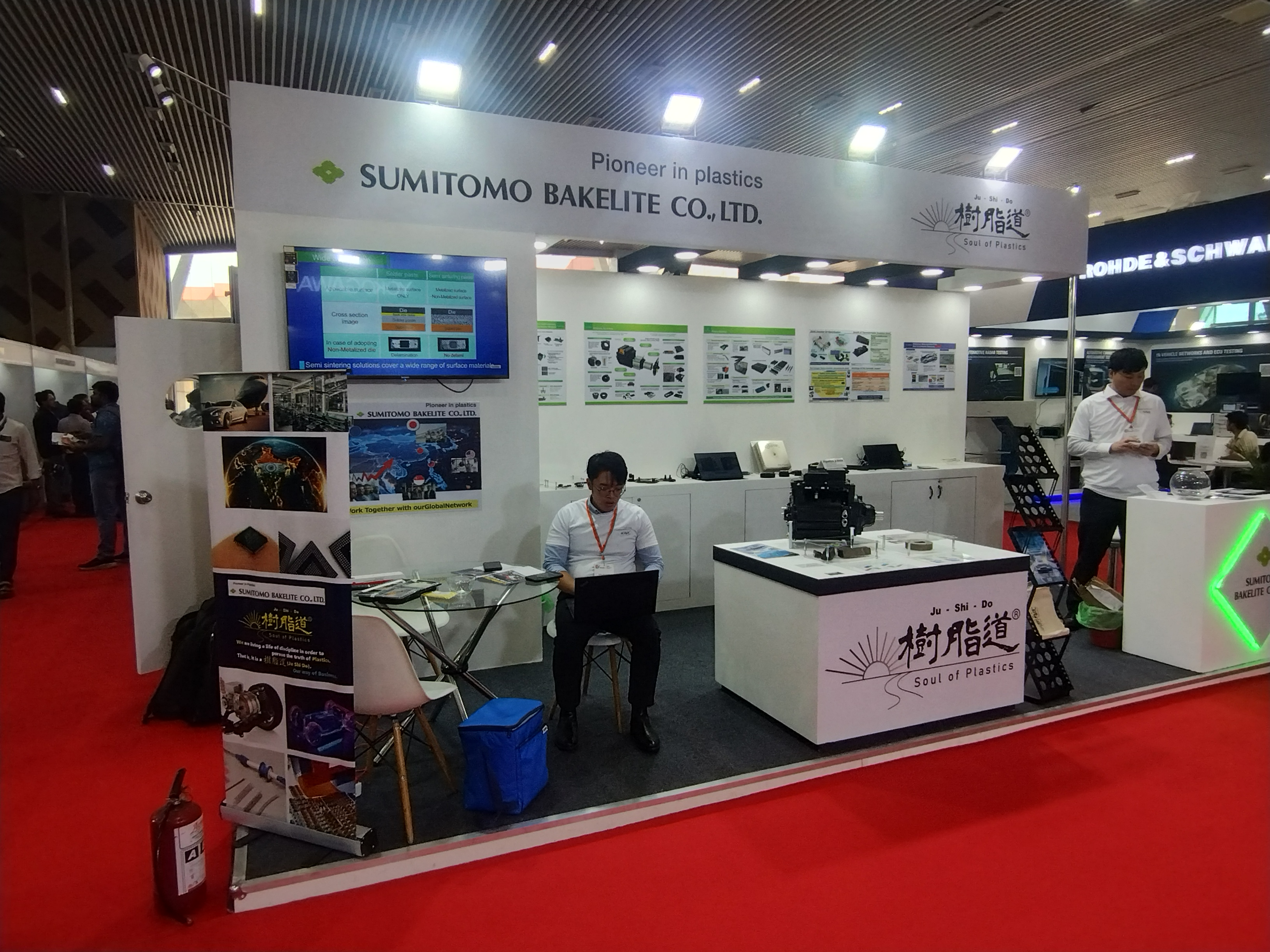
Sumitomo Bakelite Co., Ltd. at Auto EV Bharat 4.0, KTPO Exhibition centre, Bangalore (2025)

Company	Industry
Mazda Motor Corporation	Automobiles
Mitsui Sumitomo Insurance	Insurance
NEC Corporation*	Electronics and electric products
Nippon Sheet Glass Co Ltd	Glass
Osaka Titanium Technologies Co Ltd	Titanium products
Sumisho Computer Systems	Information Technology
Sumitomo Bakelite Co., Ltd.	Chemicals
Sumitomo Chemical*	Chemicals
Sumitomo Corporation*	Integrated trading
Sumitomo Electric Bordnetze	Auto parts suppliers
Sumitomo Electric Industries, Ltd.*	Electronics and electric products
Sumitomo Forestry Co., Ltd.	Lumber and housing
Sumitomo Heavy Industries*	Machinery, weaponry, and shipbuilding
Sumitomo Life	Insurance
Nippon Steel*	Steel
Sumitomo Metal Mining Co., Ltd.*	Non-ferrous metal
Sumitomo Mitsui Financial Group*	Finance
Sumitomo Mitsui Construction	Construction
Sumitomo Mitsui Trust Holdings*	Finance
Sumitomo Osaka Cement*	Cement
Sumitomo Precision Products	Precision machinery
Sumitomo Realty & Development*	Real estate
Sumitomo Riko	Rubber materials for vehicles, printers and constructions
Sumitomo Rubber Industries	Tires and rubber products
The Sumitomo Warehouse Co., Ltd.	Warehousing

* Nikkei 225 constituent company.
