= Hiroaki Saiuchi =

Japanese professional baseball player

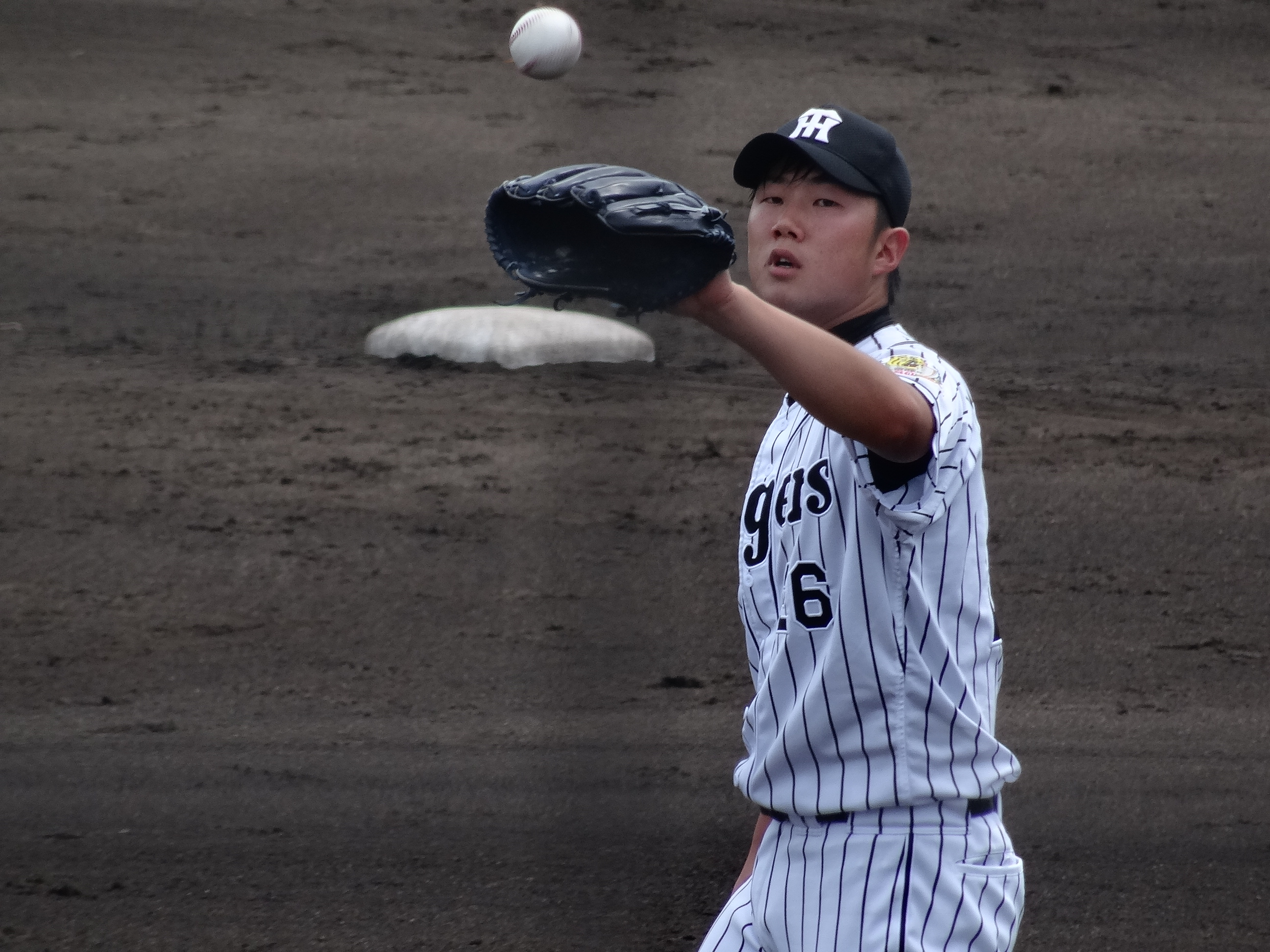
- Saiuchi with the Hanshin Tigers
- Pitcher
- Born: July 19, 1993 (age 32); Amagasaki, Hyogo
- Batted: Right Threw: Right

NPB debut
- September 2, 2012, for the Hanshin Tigers

Last NPB appearance
- October 30, 2020, for the Tokyo Yakult Swallows

NPB statistics (through 2021 season)
- Win–loss record: 3–6
- Earned run average: 4.18
- Strikeouts: 76
- Stats at Baseball Reference

Teams
- Hanshin Tigers (2012–2019); Tokyo Yakult Swallows (2020–2021)

Hiroaki Saiuchi (Japanese 歳内 宏明; born 7 July 1993) is a Japanese professional baseball player who currently plays for the Tokyo Yakult Swallows of Nippon Professional Baseball.
