= Sumitomo Masatomo =

Japanese monk and businessman (1585–1652)

Masatomo Sumitomo
- 住友 政友
- Born: December 31, 1585; Sakai, Muromachi Japan
- Died: September 17, 1652 (aged 66); Kyoto, Edo Japan
- Occupations: Buddhist monk, businessman
- Title: Founder of the Sumitomo Group

Sumitomo Masatomo (Japanese: 住友 政友, Hepburn: Sumitomo Masatomo; 31 December 1585 (O.S. 21 December 1585) – 17 September 1652) was a Japanese Buddhist monk and businessman credited with founding the eponymous Sumitomo Group. He was an 8th generation descendant of Sumitomo Tadashige. Sumitomo Tadashige said to be a 22nd generation descendant of Taira no Takamochi from the Kanmu Heishi clan, who was a grandson of the 50th Emperor of Japan, Emperor Kanmu. Originally, he was a Buddhist monk. During his lifetime, there were mainly two sects of Buddhist monks in Japan. Masatomo belonged to one of the two which later ceased to exist. Reluctant to join the other group of Buddhist monks, he turned to business to make a living. He started his business by selling books and medicines at first in a bookshop in Kyoto circa 1615.
