= Amagasaki Center Pool-mae Station =

Railway station in Amagasaki, Hyōgo Prefecture, Japan

Amagasaki Center Pool-mae Station 尼崎センタープール前駅
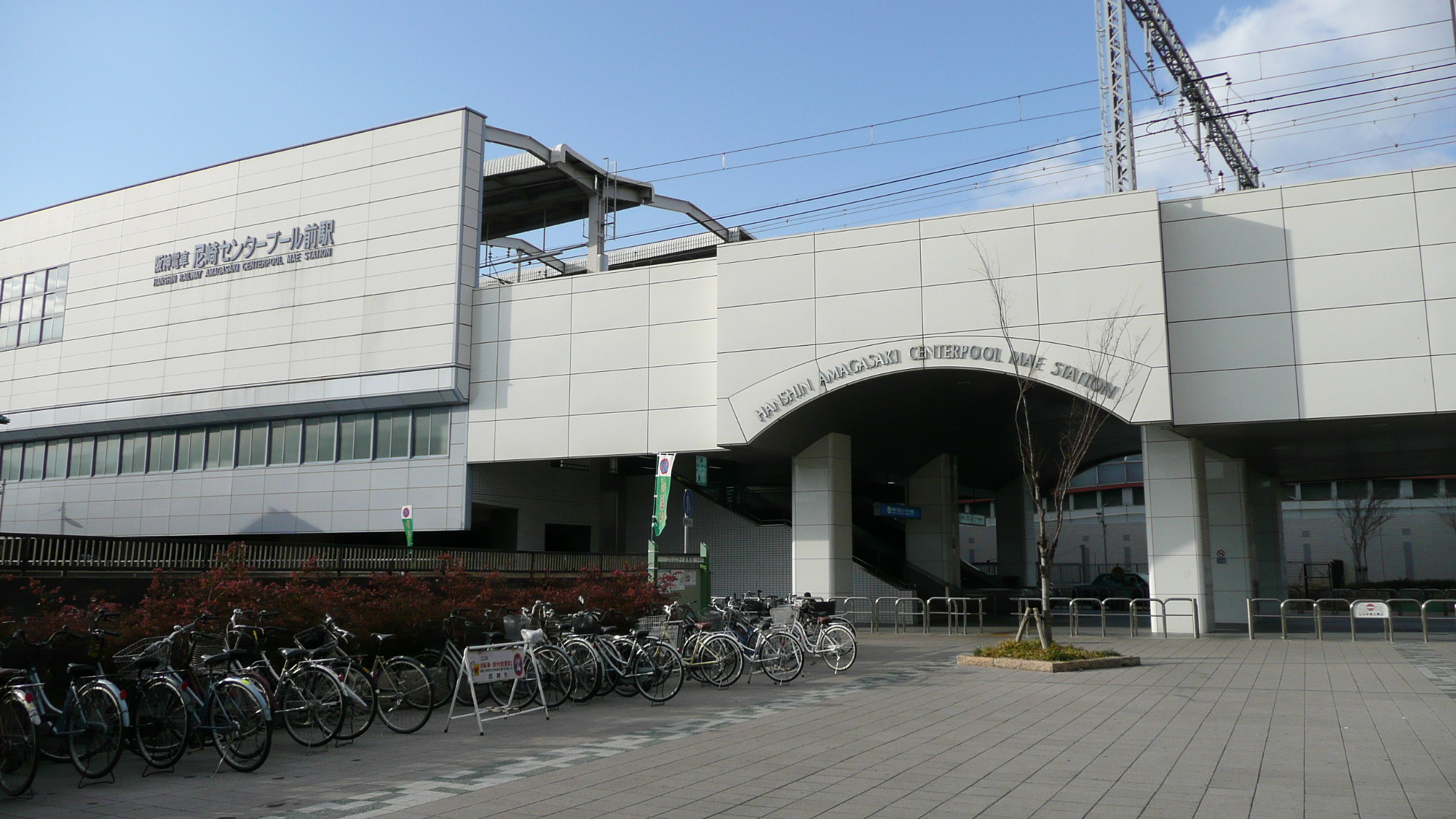
- Amagasaki Center Pool-mae Station

General information
- Location: Suimei-chō, Amagasaki-shi, Hyōgo-ken 660-0082; Japan
- Coordinates: 34°43′05″N 135°23′43″E
- Operator: Hanshin
- Line: Hanshin Main Line
- Distance: 10.8 km (6.7 miles) from Umeda
- Platforms: 2 island + 1 side platform
- Connections: Bus terminal

Other information
- Status: Staffed
- Station code: HS-11
- Website: Official website

History
- Opened: September 14, 1952

Passengers
- 2019: 10,721 (daily)

Services
Preceding station	Hanshin	Following station
Deyashiki HS 10 towards Osaka-Umeda	Main Line Local	Mukogawa HS 12 towards Motomachi
Location
- Location within Hyōgo Prefecture Location within Japan

Amagasaki Center Pool-mae Station (尼崎センタープール前駅, Amagasaki Sentāpūru-mae eki; station number: HS-11) is a passenger railway station located in the city of Amagasaki Hyōgo Prefecture, Japan. It is operated by the private transportation company Hanshin Electric Railway.

== Lines ==
Amagasaki Center Pool-mae Station is served by the Hanshin Main Line, and is located 10.8 kilometers from the terminus of the line at Umeda.

== Layout ==
The station consists of two elevated island platforms and one elevated unnumbered side platform serving four tracks. Normally only the island platforms are used, and the side platform is used as a temporary drop-off platform during the Amagasaki boat race .

=== Platforms ===
1	■ Main Line	for Amagasaki, Osaka (Umeda) , Namba, and Nara
2	■ ■■Main Line	for Amagasaki, Osaka (Umeda), Namba, and Nara
3	■ ■■Main Line	for Koshien, Kobe (Sannomiya), Akashi, and Himeji
4	■ Main Line	for Koshien, Kobe (Sannomiya), Akashi, and Himeji

== History ==
Amagasaki Center Pool-mae Station Station opened on September 14, 1952 as a temporary station on the Hanshin Main Line.

It was upgraded to an elevated station in January 1994.

Station numbering was introduced on 1 April 2014, with Amagasaki Center Pool-mae Station being designated as station number HS-11.

== Gallery ==
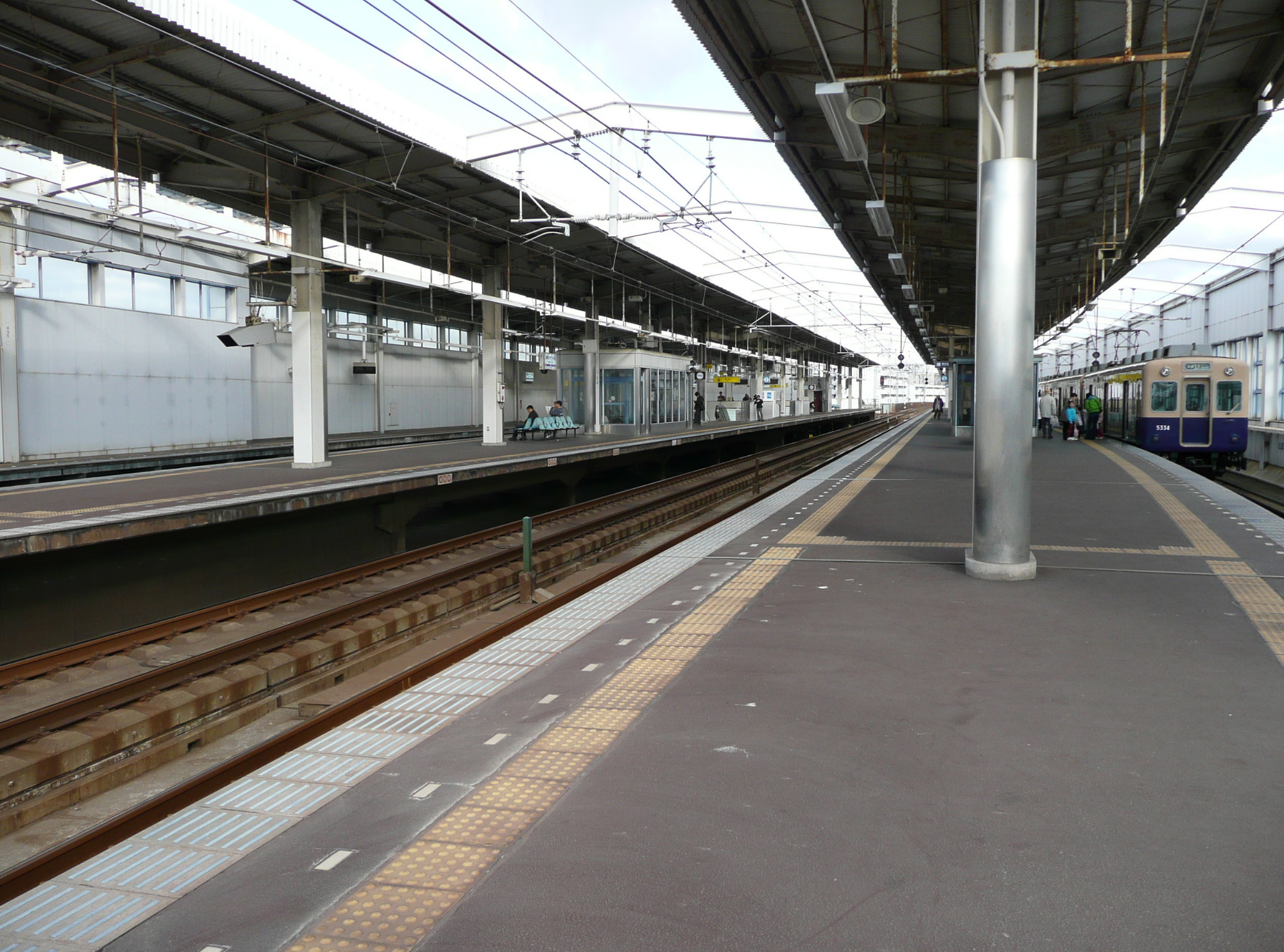
View of the elevated Hanshin Main Line platforms

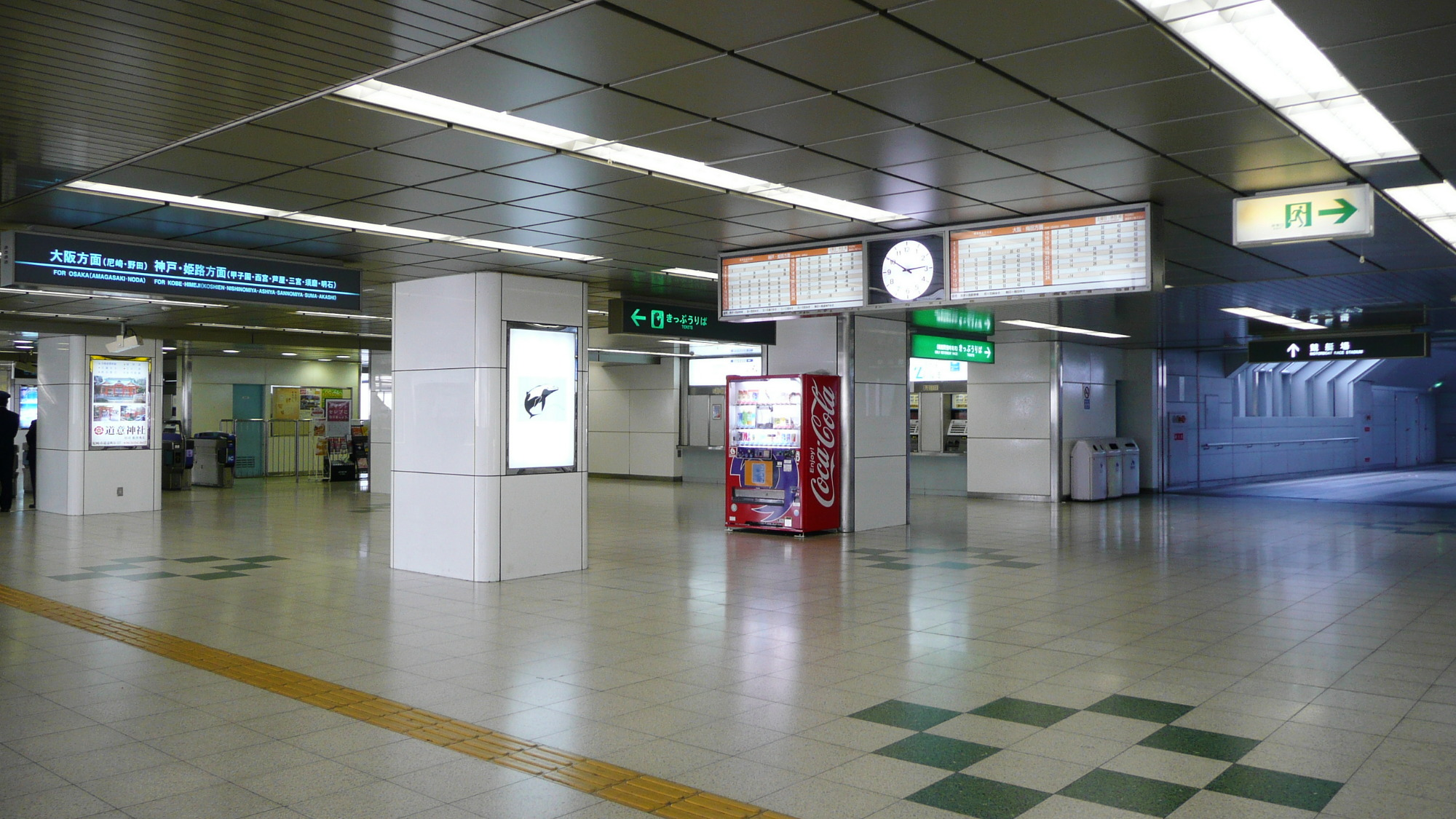
View of the ticketing hall on the concourse level with the walkway to the Amagasaki Boat Race Stadium to the right

== Passenger statistics ==
In fiscal 2019, the station was used by an average of 10,721 passengers daily

== Surrounding area ==
- Amagasaki Boat Race Stadium

== See also ==
- List of railway stations in Japan
