= Sumitomo Electric Bordnetze =

Sumitomo Electric Bordnetze (SEBN)
- Company type: SE (Private company)
- Industry: Auto parts suppliers
- Founded: 1986/2006
- Headquarters: Wolfsburg, Germany
- Key people: Soichiro Namba, CEO and Member of the Administrative Board
- Products: wiring harness systems
- Revenue: ▲€>1 billion (2019/2020)
- Number of employees: worldwide approx. 40.000 (2019/2020)
- Parent: Sumitomo Electric Industries Group
- Website: www.sebn.com

Sumitomo Electric Bordnetze is a supplier of electronic wire harnesses and components for the international automotive industry. With its Headquarter in Wolfsburg, Germany, the company employs approx. 40,000 individuals in 14 countries.

== Operations ==
Among the customers are companies of the automotive industry, in particular the Volkswagen Group with the brands VW, Volkswagen Commercial Vehicles, Audi, SEAT, Škoda, Bugatti und Porsche. The product portfolio comprises wiring harness systems, main-, motor-, door-, seat-, and high-voltage wiring harnesses. Sumitomo Electric Bordnetze accompanies vehicle projects from concept development through production to the sequence-specific delivery of products to the customer also having a specific process and testing technology as well as its own sample and prototype construction facility.

== History ==
Sumitomo ElectricS Bordnetze SE is a member of the Sumitomo Electric Industries Group. The group consists of some 340 subsidiaries, and affiliates in a wide range of sectors spread over more than 30 countries, mainly in Asia, North America and Europe. In total, Sumitomo Electric Industries employs more than 200,000 people worldwide.

Sumitomo Electric Bordnetze was founded in 1986 as a joint venture between Volkswagen AG and Siemens AG, and given the name Volkswagen Bordnetze GmbH. In the beginning of the 1990s the first international locations were built up, among others in Turkey (1990), Poland (1992), Slovakia (1996). In 2003 the formation of the joint venture Changchun Volkswagen Bordnetze Co., Ltd. in Changchun/PRC followed entering the Chinese market for the first time. In 2006 Volkswagen AG and Siemens AG were selling the Volkswagen Bordnetze GmbH, the company was acquired by Sumitomo Electric Industries Ltd. and Sumitomo Wiring Systems Ltd. and since has been operating as Sumitomo Electric Bordnetze.
