= Inadera Station =

Railway station in Amagasaki, Hyōgo Prefecture, Japan

Inadera Station 猪名寺駅
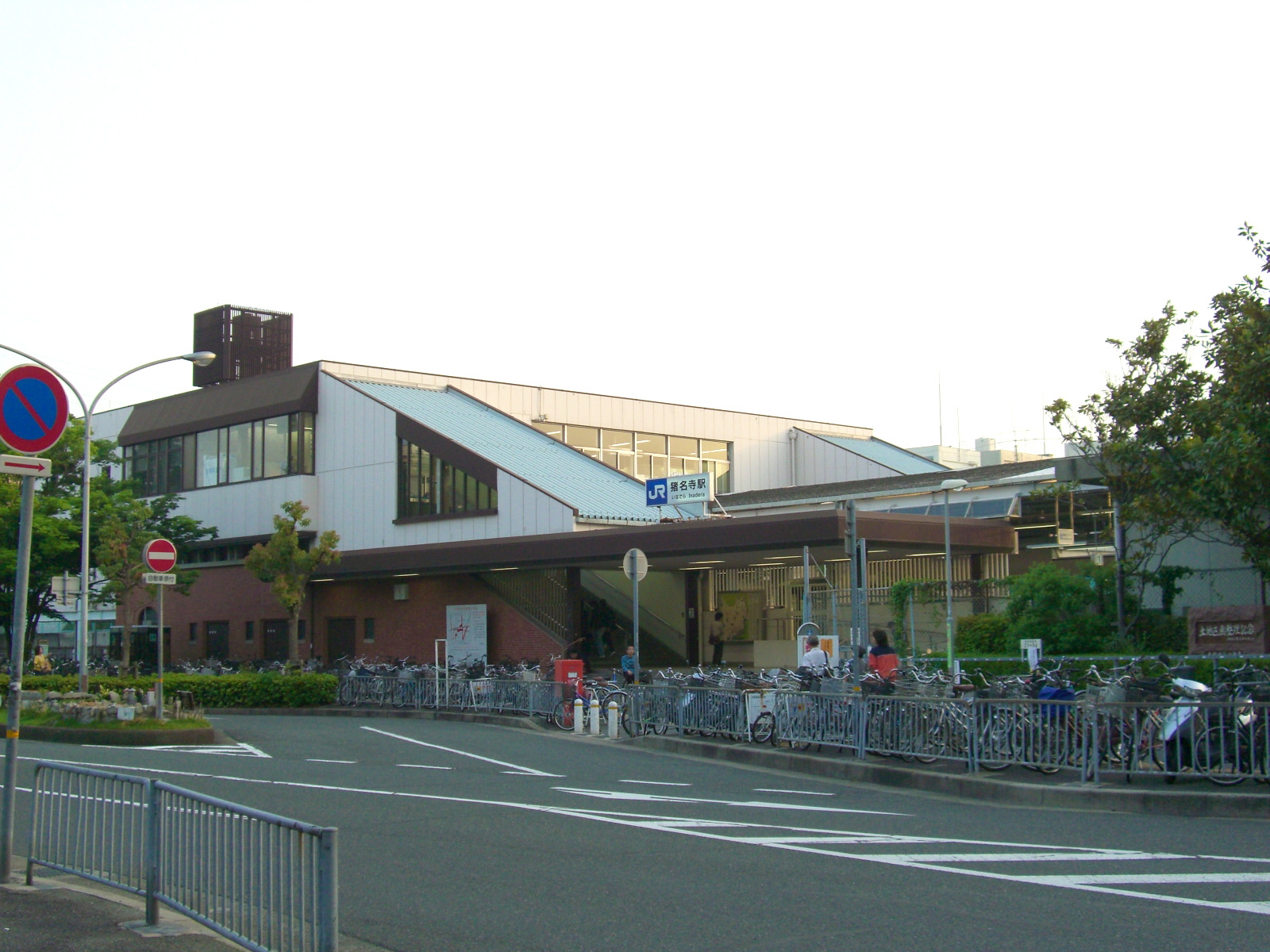
- Inadera Station, May 2007

General information
- Location: 2-1-1 Inadera, Amagasaki-shi, Hyōgo-ken 664-0846; Japan
- Coordinates: 34°45′50.71″N 135°25′21.4″E
- Owner: West Japan Railway Company
- Operator: West Japan Railway Company
- Lines: Fukuchiyama Line (JR Takarazuka Line)
- Distance: 3.9 km (2.4 miles) from Amagasaki
- Platforms: 2 side platforms
- Connections: Bus stop

Construction
- Structure type: Ground level
- Accessible: Elevator access

Other information
- Status: Staffed
- Station code: JR-G51
- Website: Official website

History
- Opened: 1 April 1944

Passengers
- FY2016: 9008 daily

Services
Preceding station	JR West	Following station
Itami towards Sasayamaguchi	JR Takarazuka Line Local	Tsukaguchi towards Ōsaka
Location
- Location within Hyōgo Prefecture Location within Japan

Inadera Station (猪名寺駅, Inadera-eki) is a passenger railway station located in the city of Amagasaki, Hyōgo Prefecture, Japan. It is operated by the West Japan Railway Company (JR West).

== Lines ==
Inadera Station is served by the Fukuchiyama Line (JR Takarazuka Line), and is located 3.9 kilometers from the terminus of the line at Amagasaki and 11.6 kilometers from Osaka.

== Station layout ==
The station consists of two ground-level opposed side platforms serving two tracks, connected by an elevated station building. The station has a staffed ticket office.

=== Platforms ===
1	■ Fukuchiyama Line (JR Takarazuka Line)	for Takarazuka and Sanda
2	■ Fukuchiyama Line (JR Takarazuka Line)	for Amagasaki, Osaka and Kitashinchi

== History ==
Inadera Station opened on 1 April 1944. With the privatization of the Japan National Railways (JNR) on 1 April 1987, the station came under the aegis of the West Japan Railway Company.

Station numbering was introduced in March 2018 with Inadera being assigned station number JR-G51.

== Passenger statistics ==
In fiscal 2016, the station was used by an average of 9008 passengers daily

== Surrounding area ==
- Gunze Town Center Tsukashin
- Kewpie Itami Plant
- Hyogo Prefectural Amagasaki Inaen High School
- Otemae University Itami Inano Campus

== See also ==
- List of railway stations in Japan
