= Deyashiki Station =

Railway station in Amagasaki, Hyōgo Prefecture, Japan

Deyashiki Station 出屋敷駅
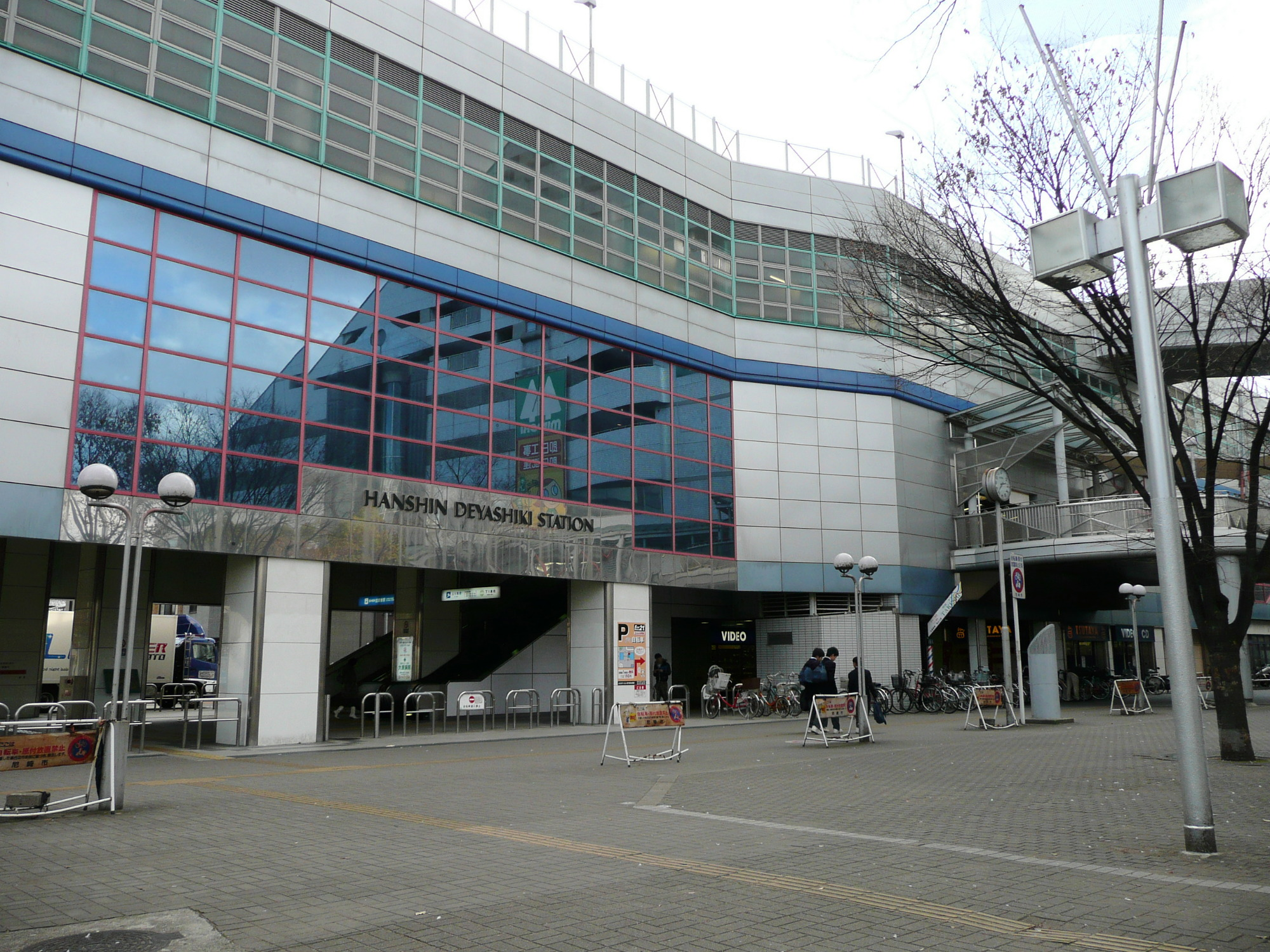
- Deyashiki Station north entrance

General information
- Location: 2, Takeya-chō, Amagasaki-shi, Hyōgo-ken; Japan
- Coordinates: 34°43′06″N 135°24′17″E
- Operator: Hanshin Electric Railway
- Line: ■ Hanshin Main Line
- Distance: 10.1 km (6.3 miles) from Umeda
- Platforms: 2 side platforms
- Tracks: 2
- Connections: Bus terminal

Construction
- Structure type: Elevated

Other information
- Status: Staffed
- Station code: HS 10
- Website: Official website

History
- Opened: April 12, 1905

Passengers
- 2020: 10,698 (daily)

Services
Hanshin Main Line (HS 10)
Amagasaki (HS 09)	Local	Amagasaki Center Pool-mae (HS 11)
Morning Express: Does not stop at this station
Express: Does not stop at this station
Rapid Express: Does not stop at this station
Morning Limited Express for Umeda: Does not stop at this station
Limited Express; Through Limited Express: Does not stop at this station
Location
- Location within Hyōgo Prefecture Location within Japan

Deyashiki Station (出屋敷駅, Deyashiki-eki; station number: HS-10) is a passenger railway station located in the city of Amagasaki Hyōgo Prefecture, Japan. It is operated by the private transportation company Hanshin Electric Railway.

== Lines ==
Deyashiki Station is served by the Hanshin Main Line, and is located 10.1 kilometers from the terminus of the line at Umeda.

== Layout ==
The station consists of two opposed elevated side platforms serving two tracks. The ticket gate and concourse are on the 2nd floor, and the platforms are on the 3rd floor.

=== Platforms ===
1	■ Main Line	for Amagasaki, Osaka (Umeda), Namba, and Nara
2	■ Main Line	for Koshien, Kobe (Sannomiya), Akashi, and Himeji

== History ==
Deyashiki Station opened on the Hanshin Main Line on 12 April 1905.

The Hanshin Amagasaki Kaigan Line was abandoned on December 1, 1962.

It was upgraded to an elevated station in January 1994.

Station numbering was introduced on 1 April 2014, with Deyashiki being designated as station number HS-10.

== Gallery ==
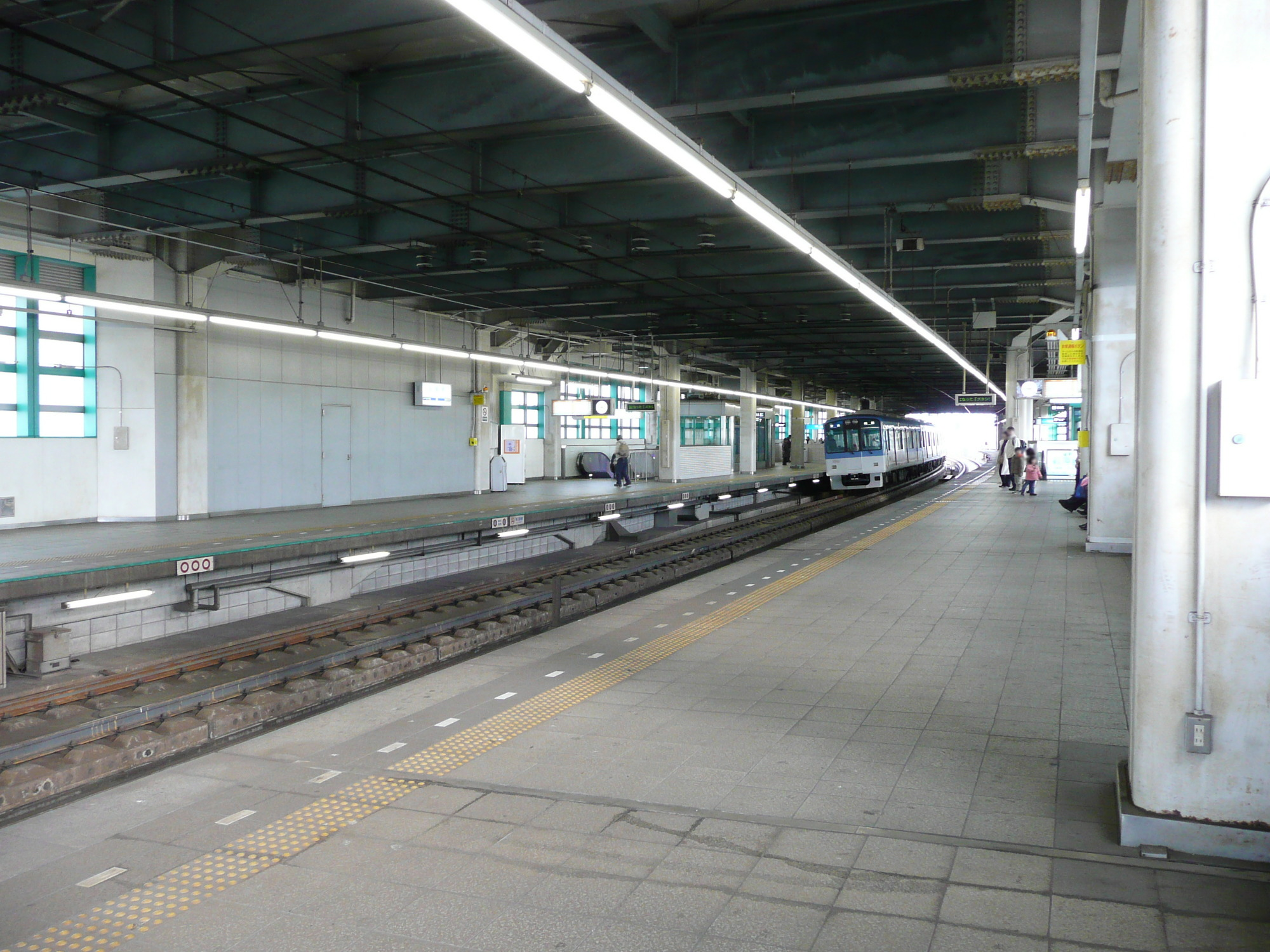
View of the platforms in 2008

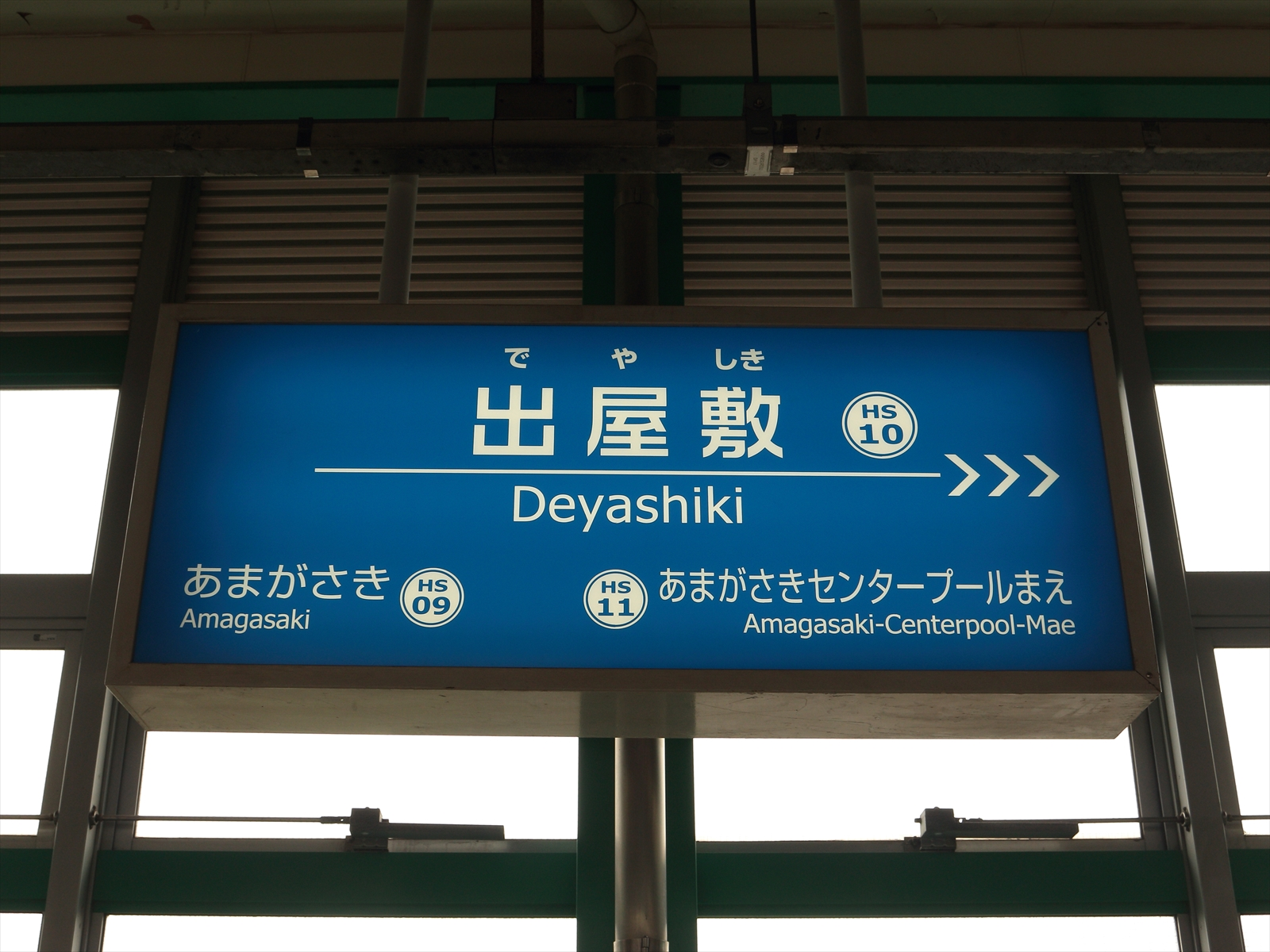
Station nameplate

== History ==
Deyashiki Station was opened on April 12, 1905, with the opening of the Hanshin Main Line

== Passenger statistics ==
In fiscal 2020, the station was used by an average of 10,698 passengers daily

== Surrounding area ==
- Riberu shopping center
- Deyashiki Park

+Kifune Shrine

== See also ==
- List of railway stations in Japan
