= Sonoda University =

Private university in Amagasaki, Japan

Coordinates: 34°44′55″N 135°24′31″E

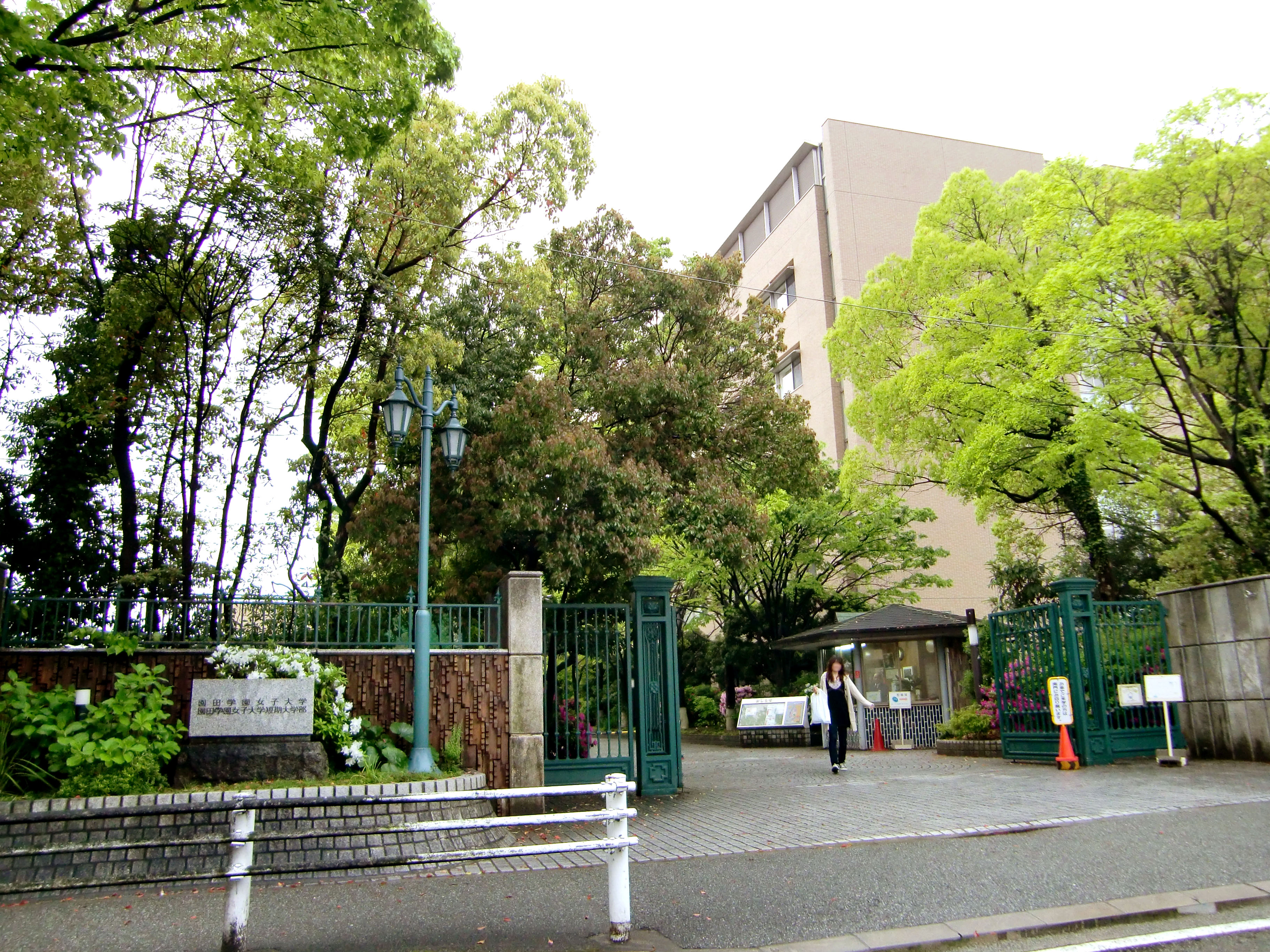
Sonoda University

Sonoda University (園田学園大学, Sonoda gakuen daigaku) is a private university in Amagasaki, Japan, established in 1966.
