= Amagasaki =

Amagasaki 尼崎市
- Core city
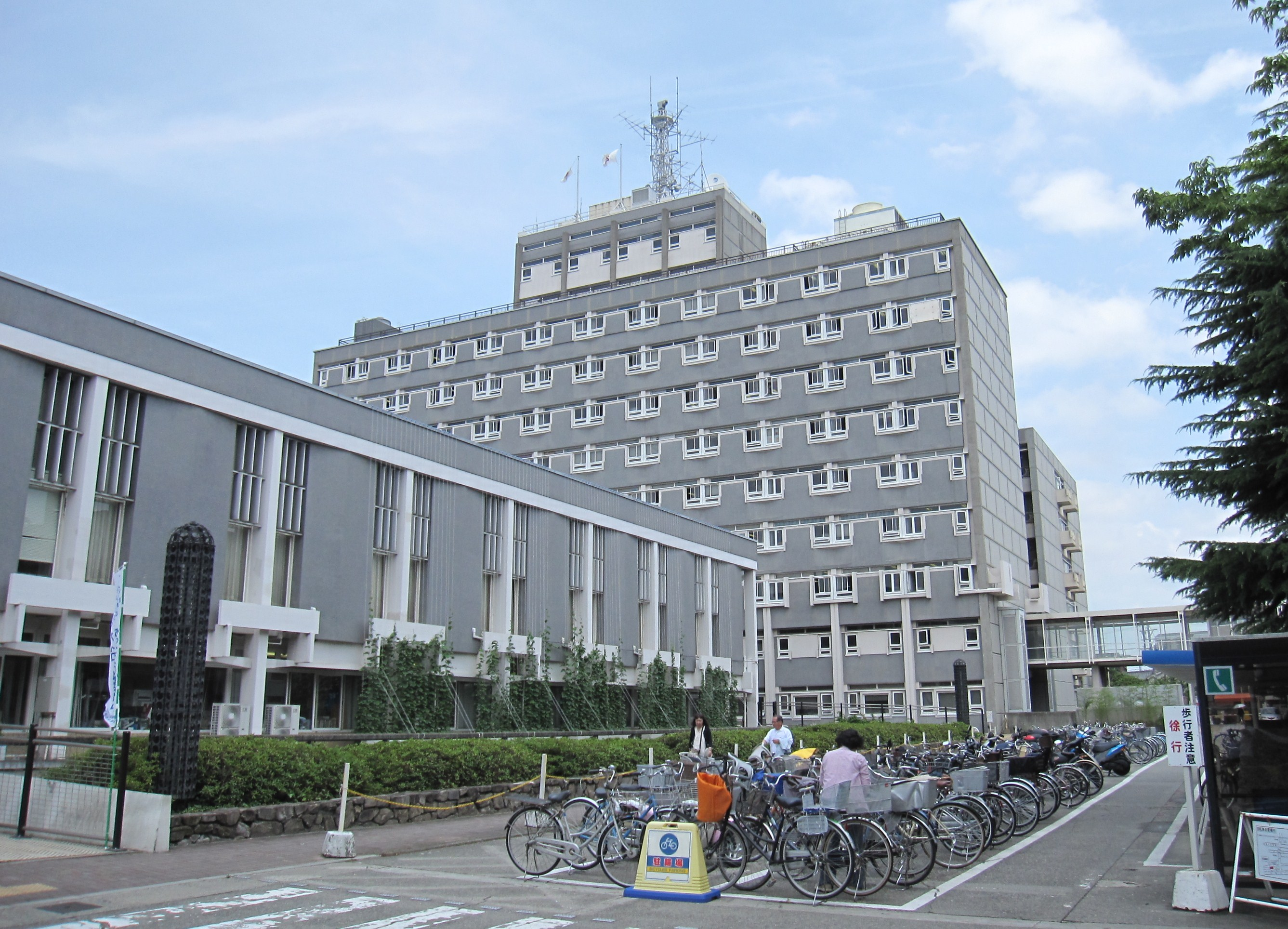
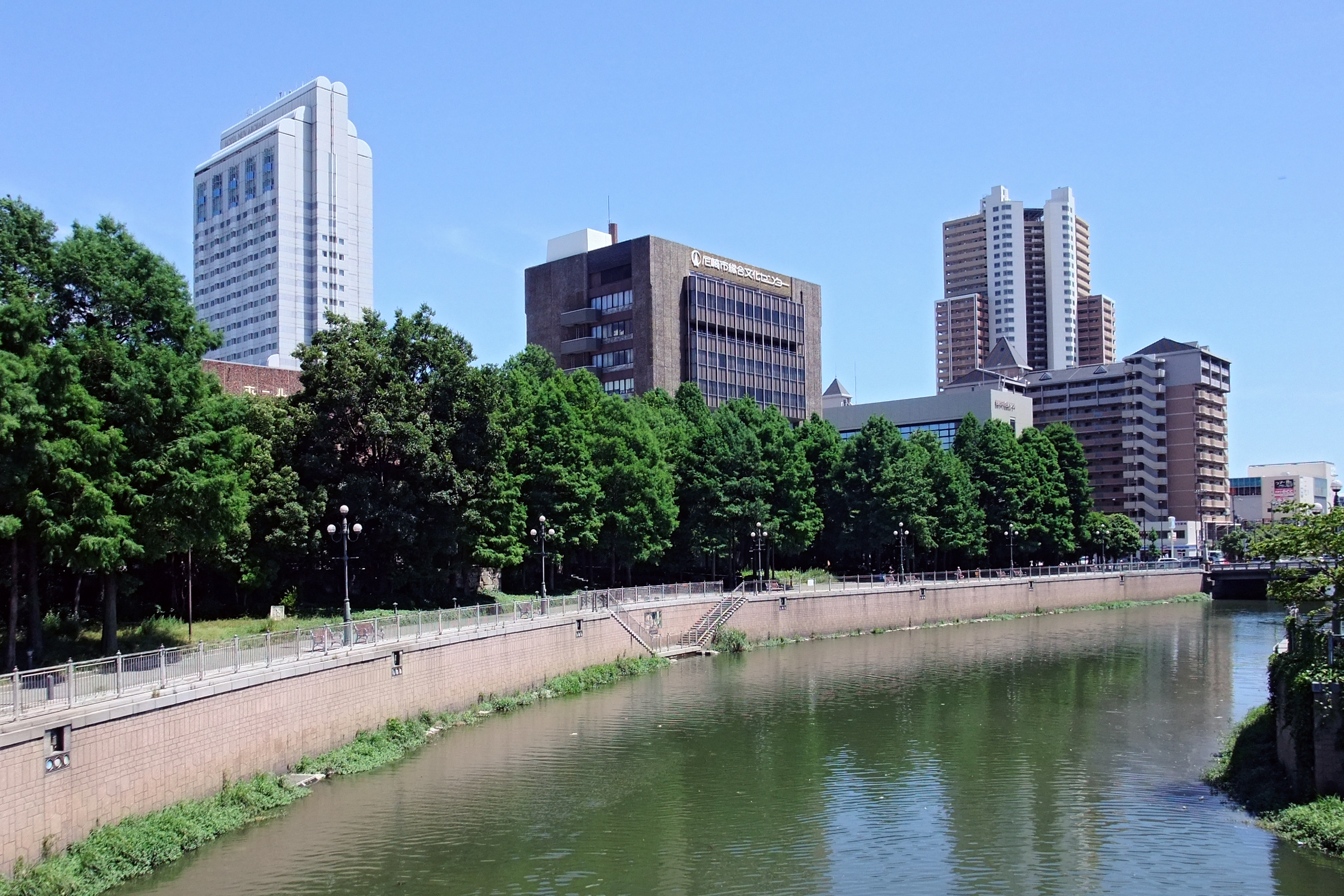
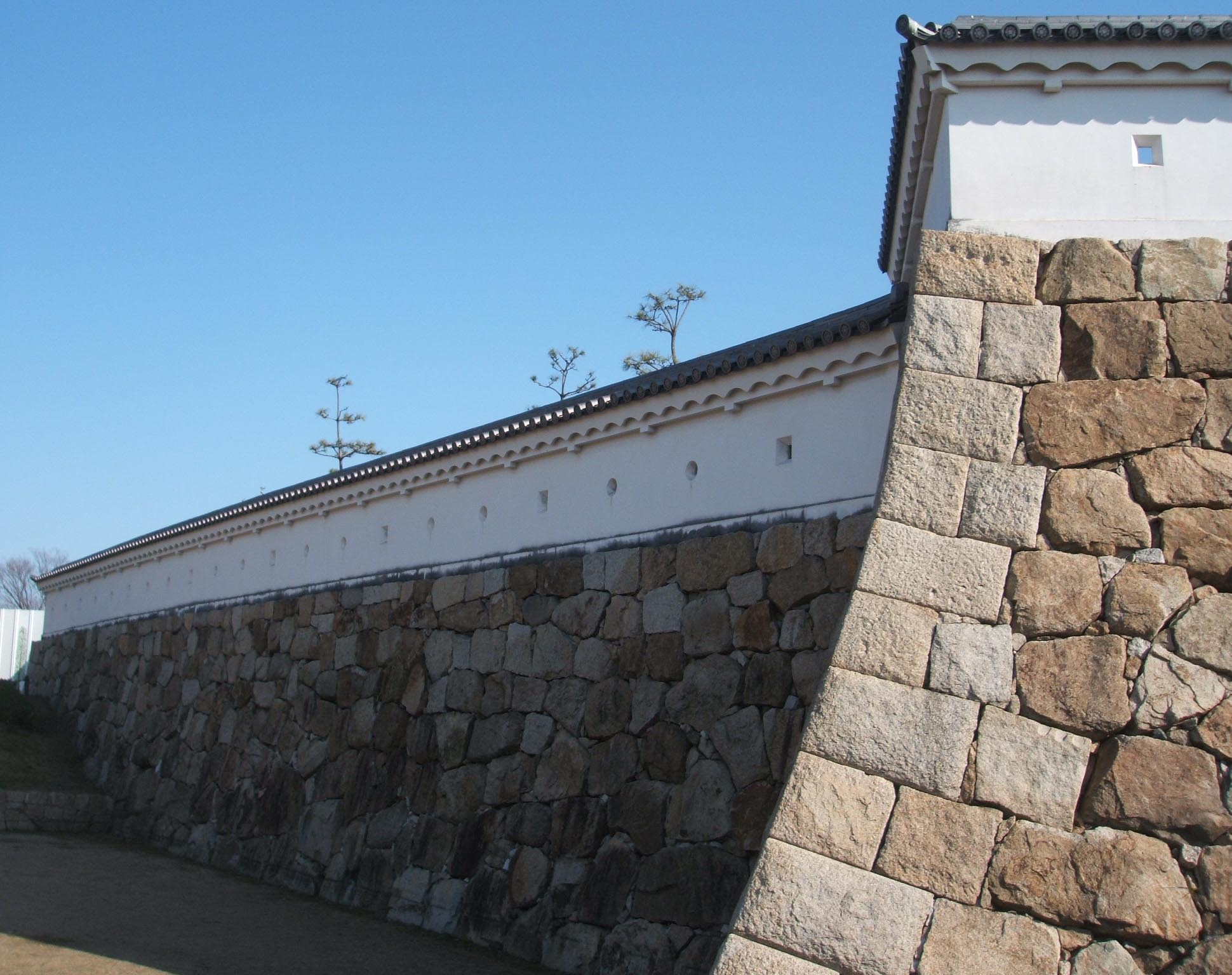
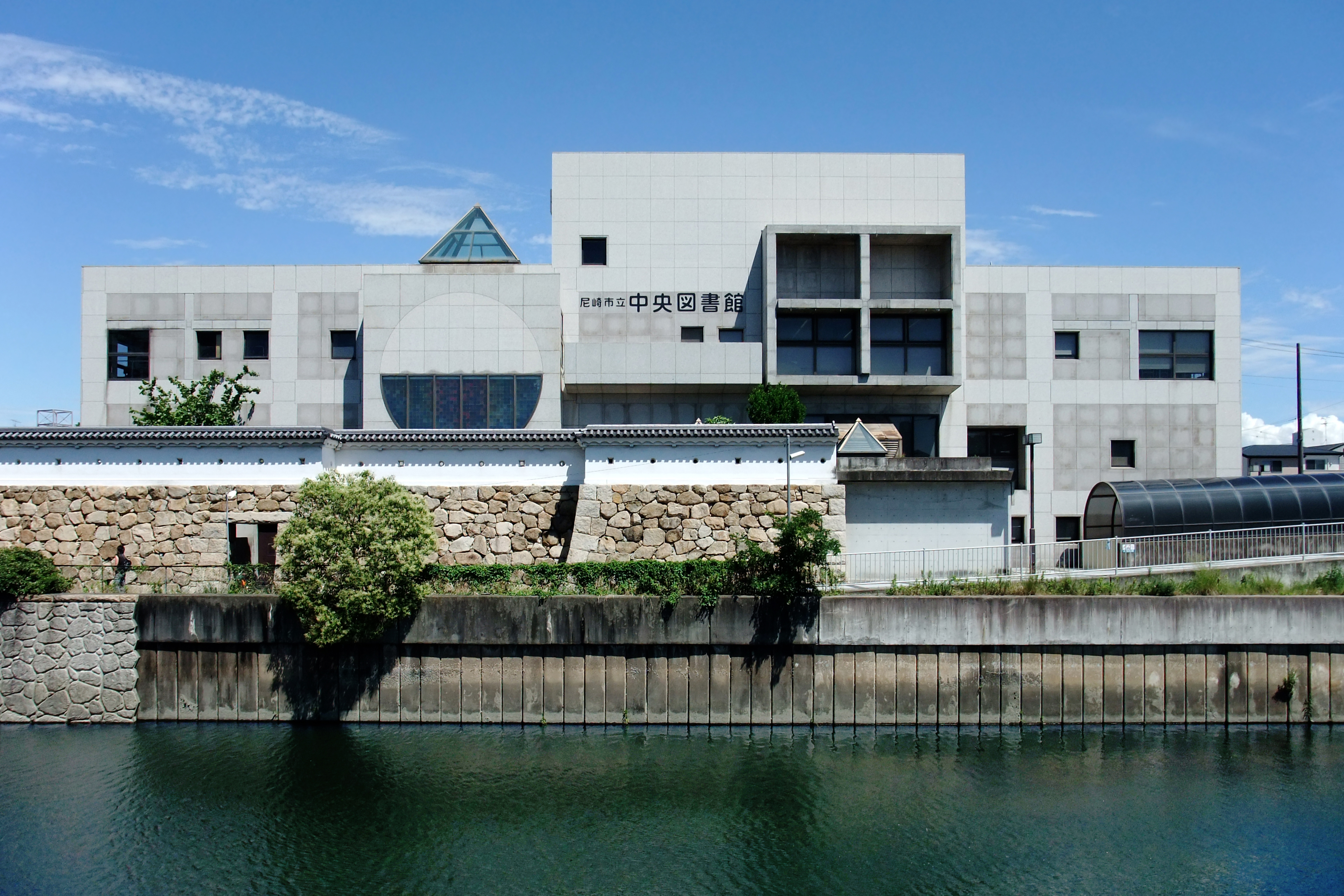
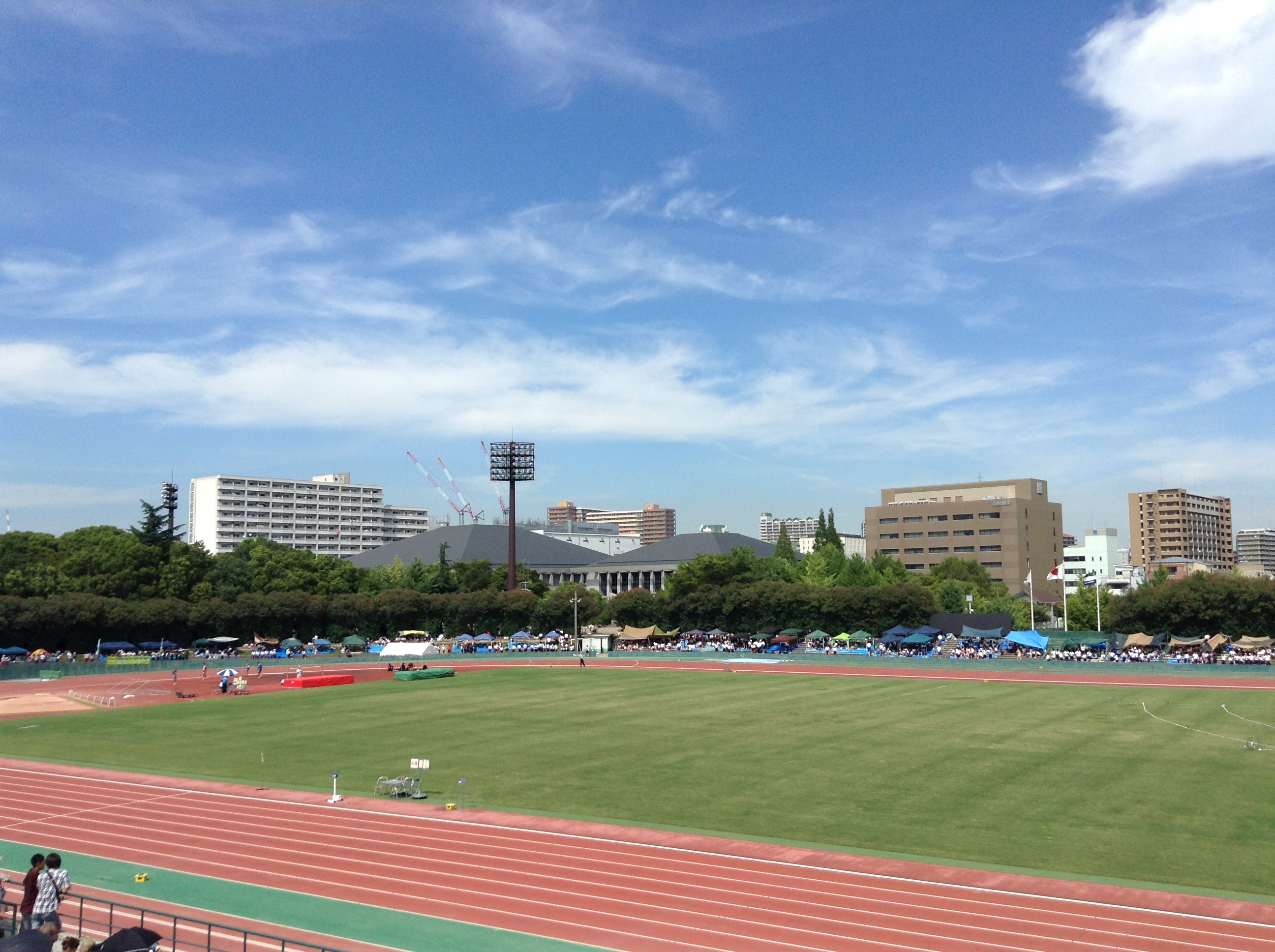
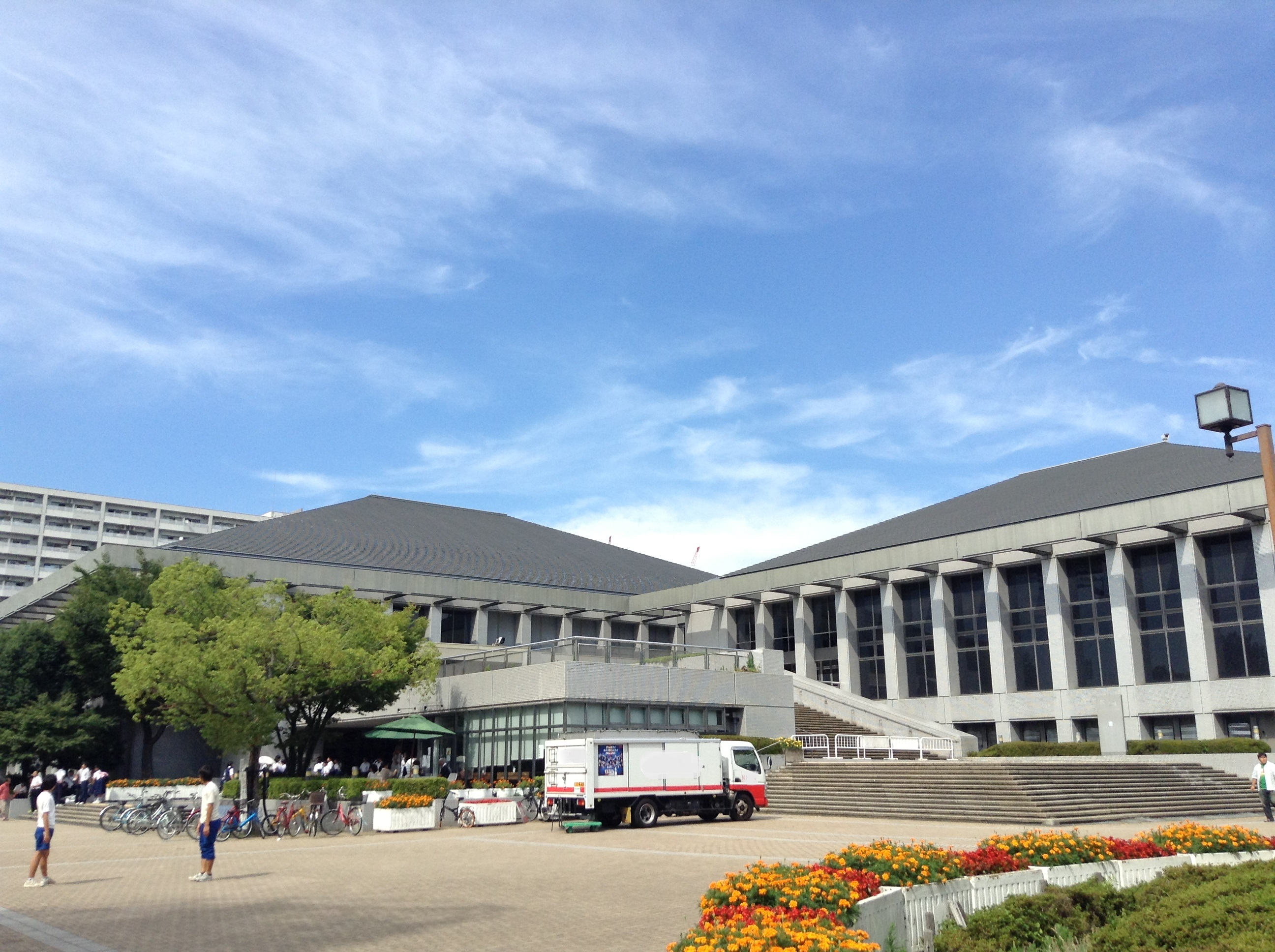
- Top: Amagasaki City Hall Second row: Amagasaki Culture Zonel; Third row left: Amagasaki Castle walls, right: City Library Bottom left: Amagasaki Stadium, right:Gymnasium

- Flag Emblem
- Interactive map of Amagasaki
- Location in Japan
- Coordinates: 34°44′N 135°24′E
- Country: Japan
- Region: Kansai
- Prefecture: Hyōgo

Government
  - Mayor: Shin Matsumoto

Area
  - Total: 50.72 km^{2} (19.58 sq mi)

Population (November 1, 2022)
  - Total: 455,555
  - Density: 8,982/km^{2} (23,260/sq mi)
- Time zone: UTC+09:00 (JST)
- City hall address: 1-23-1 Higashinanamatsu-chō, Amagasaki-shi, Hyōgo-ken 660-8501
- Website: Official website
- Symbols
- Flower: Oleander
- Tree: Dogwood

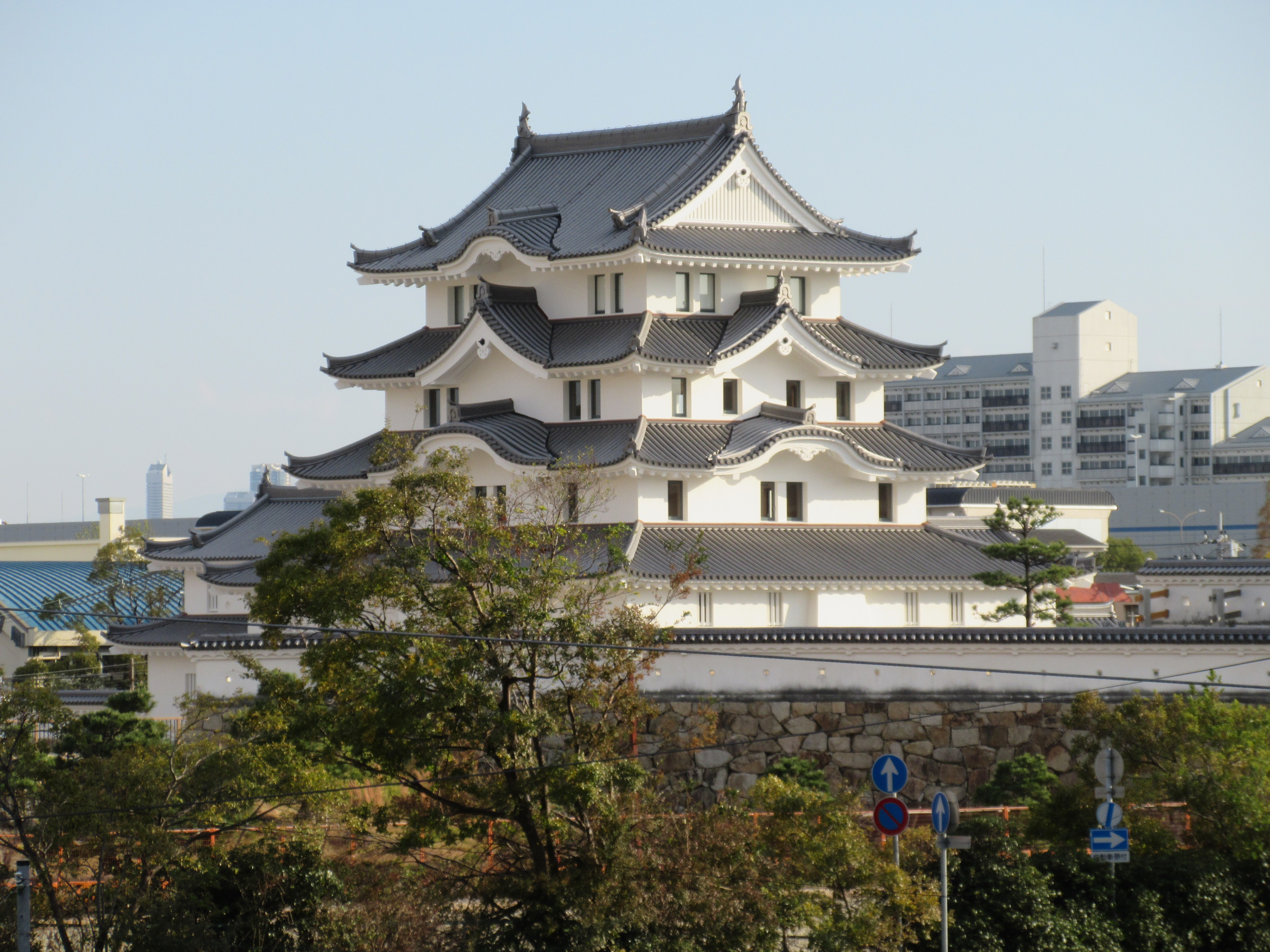
Amagasaki Castle

Aerial view of Amagasaki city center

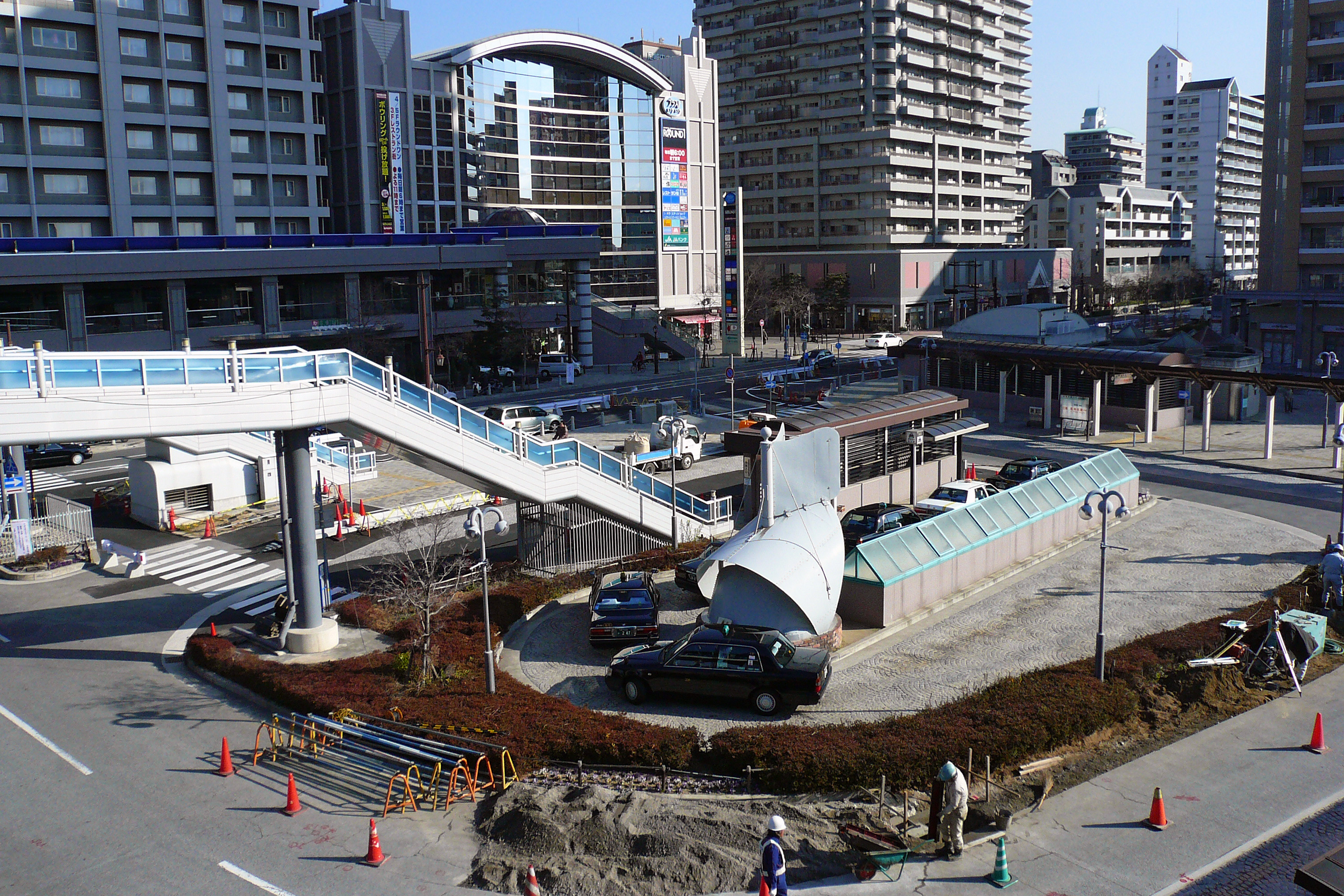
Amagasaki Station

Amagasaki (尼崎市, Amagasaki-shi; Japanese pronunciation: [ä̀.mä́.ɡä́.sä̀.k̟ʲì, -ŋä́.sä̀.k̟ʲì, -ɡä́.sä́.k̟ʲi̥.ɕì, -ŋä́.sä́.k̟ʲi̥.ɕì]) is an industrial city located in Hyōgo Prefecture, Japan. As of 30 November 2022, the city had an estimated population of 455,555 in 223,812 households, and a population density of 9000 persons per km². The total area of the city is 50.72 km^{2} (19.58 sq mi).

== Geography ==
Amagasaki is located in far southeastern Hyōgo Prefecture, next to Osaka. It has the fourth largest population in Hyōgo Prefecture after Kobe, Himeji, and Nishinomiya. Residential areas account for most of the rest of the coastal areas, industrial areas along the Meishin Expressway and JR West Fukuchiyama Line, commercial areas around Hanshin Amagasaki Station and JR Amagasaki Station, and its population density is the highest among municipalities in Hyogo Prefecture. Ground subsidence caused by the pumping up of groundwater by factories has reduced one-third of the city's area to sea level, causing flooding damage due to storm surges.

=== Neighboring municipalities ===
Hyōgo Prefecture

- Itami
- Nishinomiya

Osaka Prefecture

- Osaka (Nishiyodogawa-ku, Yodogawa-ku)
- Toyonaka

=== Climate ===
Amagasaki has a humid subtropical climate (Köppen Cfa) characterized by warm summers and cool winters with light snowfall. The average annual temperature in Amagasaki is 15.0 °C. The average annual rainfall is 1475 mm with September as the wettest month. The temperatures are highest on average in August, at around 26.9 °C, and lowest in January, at around 3.7 °C.

== Demographics ==
Per Japanese census data, the population of Amagasaki peaked around the 1970s has been decreasing steadily since.

Historical population
Year	Pop.	±%
1920	78,371	—
1930	121,026	+54.4%
1940	274,516	+126.8%
1950	279,264	+1.7%
1960	405,955	+45.4%
1970	553,696	+36.4%
1980	523,650	−5.4%
1990	498,999	−4.7%
2000	466,187	−6.6%
2010	453,608	−2.7%

== History ==
The area of Amagasaki was part of ancient Kawabe District of Settsu Province and has been inhabited since ancient times, with the traces of Yayoi period settlements and many kofun burial mounds found within the city limits. From the Heian period, the area was known for its port of Daimotsuura. During the Edo period, Amagasaki prospered as the castle town of Amagasaki Domain undertake Aoayama and subsequently the Matsudaira clans. The town of Amagasaki was established on April 1, 1889 with the creation of the modern municipalities system. It was elevated to city status on October 1, 1916.

The 1934 Muroto typhoon caused 145 fatalities and much of the city was destroyed by air raids on June 1 and June 15, 1945 during World War II. The 1995 Great Hanshin earthquake also caused considerable damage and 49 fatalities. Amagasaki was designated a special city on April 1, 2001 with increased local autonomy. A commuter train derailed on the Fukuchiyama Line near Amagasaki on April 25, 2005, resulting in more than 100 dead and 550 injured. On April 1, 2009, Amagasaki was elevated to the status of a core city.

== Government ==
Amagasaki has a mayor-council form of government with a directly elected mayor and a unicameral city council of 42 members. Amagasaki contributes seven members to the Hyōgo Prefectural Assembly. In terms of national politics, the city is in the Hyōgo 8th district of the lower house of the Diet of Japan.

=== Politics of Amagasaki ===
- 2002 Amagasaki mayoral election

On 22 November 2010 Kazumi Inamura became the first popularly elected Greens Japan Mayor as well as the youngest popularly-elected female mayor of the city with 54% of the vote.

== Economy ==
Amagasaki is a major part of the Hanshin Industrial Region. Businesses headquartered in the city include manufacturers such as Osaka Titanium Technologies. The value of manufactured goods shipments in Amagasaki was 1,288 billion yen in 2004.

== Education ==
Amagasaki has 42 public elementary schools and 17 public middle schools operated by the city government, 11 public high schools operated by the Hyōgo Prefectural Board of Education, and two combined private middle/high schools. In addition, the city also operates one special education school for the handicapped. The College of Industrial Technology, a junior college, and the Sonoda Women's University, a women's four-year college with associated junior college are located in the city.

The city has a North Korean school, Amagasaki Korean Elementary and Middle School (尼崎朝鮮初中級学校). It previously had a second school, Amagasaki East Korean Elementary School (尼崎東朝鮮初級学校).

== Transportation ==
=== Railways ===
JR West - Tōkaidō Main Line (JR Kobe Line)

- Amagasaki - Tachibana

JR West - Fukuchiyama Line (JR Takarazuka Line)

- Amagasaki - Tsukaguchi - Inadera

JR West - JR Tōzai Line

- Amagasaki - Tsukaguchi - Inadera

Hankyu - Kobe Line

- Sonoda - Tsukaguchi - Mukonoso

Hankyu - Itami Line

- Tsukaguchi

Hanshin Electric Railway - Hanshin Main Line

- Kuise - Daimotsu - Amagasaki - Deyashiki - Amagasaki Center Pool-mae - Mukogawa

Hanshin Electric Railway - Hanshin Namba Line

- Amagasaki - Daimotsu

=== Highways ===
- Meishin Expressway
- Hanshin Expressway Kobe Route
- Hanshin Expressway Bayshore Route (Port of Osaka-Kobe)
- National Route 2
- National Route 43
- National Route 171

== Sister cities ==
- Augsburg, Bavaria, Germany, since April 7, 1959
- Anshan, Liaoning, China, since February 2, 1983 (friendship city)
- Kami, Hyogo Prefecture, Japan, friendship city since 1974 (formerly Mikata)

== Local attractions ==
- Tano Site, Yayoi period settlement trace, National Historic Site
- Amagasaki Castle

== Notable people from Amagasaki ==
- Chiyu (ex. bassist of the band Sug and solo singer)
- Mitsue Aoki (manga artist)
- Chikamatsu Monzaemon (dramatist of the Edo period)
- Cobra (punk rock band)
- Downtown (comedy duo)
  - Hitoshi Matsumoto
  - Masatoshi Hamada (originally from Naniwa-ku, Osaka)
- Gero (singer)
- Heath (bassist of the band X Japan)
- Kunio Hiramatsu (politician)
- Kojin Karatani (philosopher)
- Toshiki Kashu (actor)
- Ryuto Kazuhara (vocalist of boy band Generations from Exile Tribe)
- Keichū (Kokugaku scholar from the Edo period)
- Yoshitada Konoike (politician)
- Maggy (fashion model)
- Ryo Matsuda (actor)
- Shōta Matsushima (actor)
- Kaho Minami (actress)
- Akihiro Murata (shogi player) – originally from Uozu, Toyama
- Ramo Nakajima (novelist)
- Ai Okawa (fashion model, former idol from Idoling!!!)
- Kazuo Shiraga (modern artist)
- Keiko Tobe (manga artist)
- Rena Uehara (singer) – born in Amagasaki, based in Osaka
- Yu Yagami (manga artist)
- Seiichi Yamamoto (musician) – born in Amagasaki, based in Osaka
- Kinuyo Yamashita (video game music composer)
- Shota Yasuda (guitarist of boy band Kanjani Eight)
- Ai Yazawa (manga artist)

=== Athletes ===
- Ritsu Doan (football player)
- Yutaka Enatsu (baseball player) - Originally from Nara Prefecture
- Megu Hirose (softball player)
- Daisuke Hosokawa (swimmer)
- Takahiro Ikeyama (baseball player)
- Hideki Irabu (former baseball player) - Originally from Hirara, Okinawa (currently Miyakojima, Okinawa)
- Norihito Kaneto (baseball player)
- Ayumi Karino (softball player)
- Kamui Kobayashi (auto racing driver)
- Jay Litherland (swimmer)
- Tochinowaka Michihiro (former sumo wrestler)
- Naoki Miyanishi (baseball player) - Originally from Nishinomiya, Hyogo
- Minoru Murayama (former baseball player) - Originally from Kita-ku, Kobe
- Takahiko Nomaguchi (baseball player)
- Kengo Nomoto (basketball player)
- Daisuke Oku (football player)
- Hiroaki Saiuchi (baseball player)
- Andy Wu (professional wrestler)
