= Tsukaguchi Station (JR West) =

Railway station in Amagasaki, Hyōgo Prefecture, Japan

Tsukaguchi Station 塚口駅
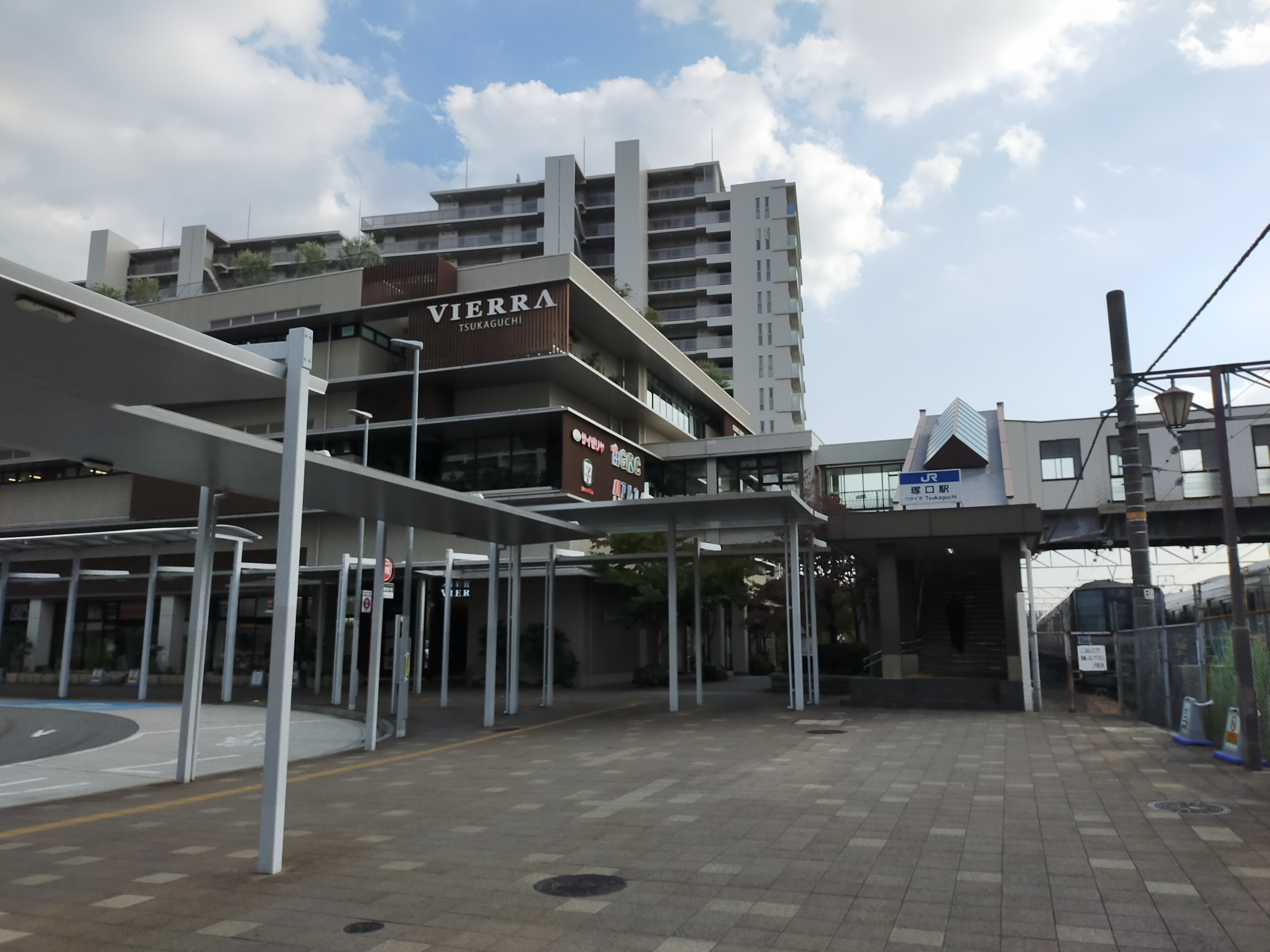
- Tsukaguchi Station, November 2022

General information
- Location: 1-9-1 Higashitsukaguchicho, Amagasaki-shi, Hyōgo-ken 661-0011; Japan
- Coordinates: 34°45′3.51″N 135°25′29.72″E
- Owner: West Japan Railway Company
- Operator: West Japan Railway Company
- Lines: Fukuchiyama Line (JR Takarazuka Line)
- Distance: 2.5 km (1.6 miles) from Amagasaki
- Platforms: 1 side + 1 island platform
- Connections: Bus stop

Construction
- Structure type: Ground level
- Accessible: Yes

Other information
- Status: Staffed
- Station code: JR-G50
- Website: Official website

History
- Opened: 6 March 1894

Passengers
- FY2016: 9986 daily
Location
- Location within Hyōgo Prefecture Location within Japan

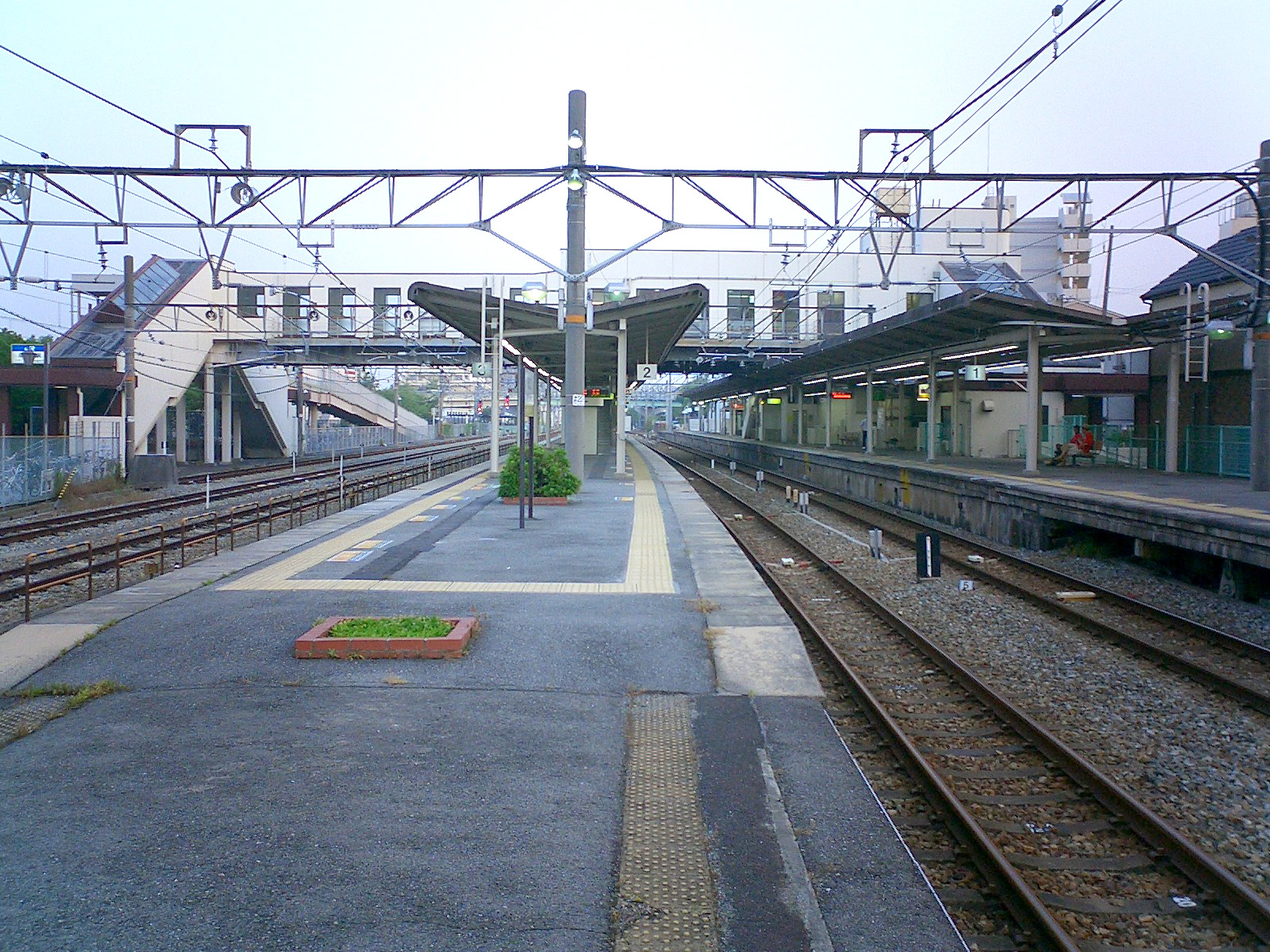
Platform

Tsukaguchi Station (塚口駅, Tsukaguchi-eki) is a passenger railway station located in the city of Amagasaki, Hyōgo Prefecture, Japan. It is operated by the West Japan Railway Company (JR West).

== Lines ==
Tsukaguchi Station is served by the Fukuchiyama Line (JR Takarazuka Line), and is located 2.5 kilometers from the terminus of the line at Amagasaki and 10.2 kilometers from Osaka.

== Station layout ==
The station consists of one ground-level island platform and one side platform, connected by an elevated station building. There are three depot tracks on the west side of the platform, which are used to store trains arriving at and departing from Amagasaki Station at night. The storage track extends further south (towards Amagasaki Station) along the main line, and the maintenance vehicles are stored there.. The station has a Midori no Madoguchi staffed ticket office.

=== Platforms ===
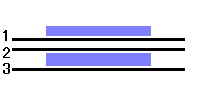
→:for Inadera ←:for Amagasaki

1	■ Fukuchiyama Line (JR Takarazuka Line)	for Takarazuka and Sanda
2, 3	■ Fukuchiyama Line (JR Takarazuka Line)	for Amagasaki, Osaka and Kitashinchi

== Adjacent stations ==
«	Service	»
JR West Fukuchiyama Line (JR Takarazuka Line)
Amagasaki	Local trains	Inadera
Amagasaki	Regional Rapid Service (through the JR Tozai Line, returning)	Terminus
Amagasaki	Rapid Service (through the JR Tozai Line, returning)	Terminus
Regional Rapid Service (except above): Does not stop at this station
Rapid Service (except above): Does not stop at this station
Tambaji Rapid Service: Does not stop at this station

== History ==
Tsukaguchi Station opened on 6 March 1894 on the Settsu Railway (which merged into Hankaku Railway in 1897, was nationalized as part of Japanese National Railways in 1907, and was renamed from the Hankaku Line to the Fukuchiyama Line in 1912). The JNR Amagasakiko Line was discontinued on 1 February 1984. With the privatization of the Japan National Railways (JNR) on 1 April 1987, the station came under the aegis of the West Japan Railway Company.

Station numbering was introduced in March 2018 with Tsukaguchi being assigned station number JR-G50.

=== Past line ===
«	Service	»
Japan National Railways Fukuchiyama Line (Amagasakiko Line)
Terminus	-	Amagasaki

== Passenger statistics ==
In fiscal 2016, the station was used by an average of 9986 passengers daily

== Surrounding area ==
- Million Town Tsukaguchi
- Mitsubishi Electric Itami Works
- Kamisakabenishi Park
- Amagasaki Urban Botanical Garden

== See also ==
- List of railway stations in Japan
- Tsukaguchi Station (Hankyu)
