= Osaka Titanium Technologies =

Metal manufacturing company

OSAKA Titanium Technologies Co., Ltd.
- Company type: Public KK
- Traded as: TYO: 5726
- Industry: Non-ferrous metals; Chemicals
- Founded: Osaka, Japan (November 26, 1952)
- Headquarters: 1 Higashihama-cho, Amagasaki, Hyogo 660-8533, Japan
- Key people: Shozo Nishizawa, (CEO and President)
- Products: Titanium sponge and ingot; Polycrystalline silicon; High-Performance materials
- Revenue: $ 594 million (FY 2012) (¥ 55.876 billion) (FY 2012)
- Net income: $ 22 million (FY 2012) (¥ 2.075 billion) (FY 2012)
- Number of employees: 752 (as of March 31, 2013); 167 (temporary staff)
- Website: Official website

Osaka Titanium Technologies Co., Ltd. (大阪チタニウムテクノロジーズ, Ōsaka Chitaniumu Tekunorojīzu Kabushiki-gaisha) is a Japanese non-ferrous metal manufacturing company based in Amagasaki, Hyōgo Prefecture, Japan. It is the world's second largest producer of titanium sponge after VSMPO-Avisma.

It produces titanium products using the Kroll process, and also produces silicon products.

In 2010, increased demand for titanium led to increased supply capacity, but Osaka Titanium Technologies was still able to raise prices due to continuing strong demand from the aviation industry.

The company is part of the Sumitomo Group, one of the largest Japanese keiretsu.

== History ==
The company was founded in 1937 as Osaka Special Steel Manufacturing. Sumitomo Metal Industries took a stake in 1952, and work began on titanium. Also in 1952, the company changed its name to Osaka Titanium Co., Ltd. Kobe Steel took an equity stake in the company in 1953.

In 2002, the company was named Sumitomo Titanium Corporation and was listed on the first section of Tokyo Stock Exchange, and in 2007, it was renamed Osaka Titanium Technologies.

== Business segments and products ==
- Titanium
  - Titanium sponge
  - Titanium ingot
  - Titanium tetrachloride and titanium tetrachloride aqueous solution
  - Ferro-titanium
- Polycrystalline Silicon
- High-performance Materials
  - High-purity titanium
  - Silicon monoxide
  - TILOP (Gas-atomized titanium powder)
  - Titanium powder
  - Photocatalysts
