= Sumitomo Electric Industries =

Japanese manufacturer of electric wire and optical fiber cables

Sumitomo Electric Industries, Ltd.

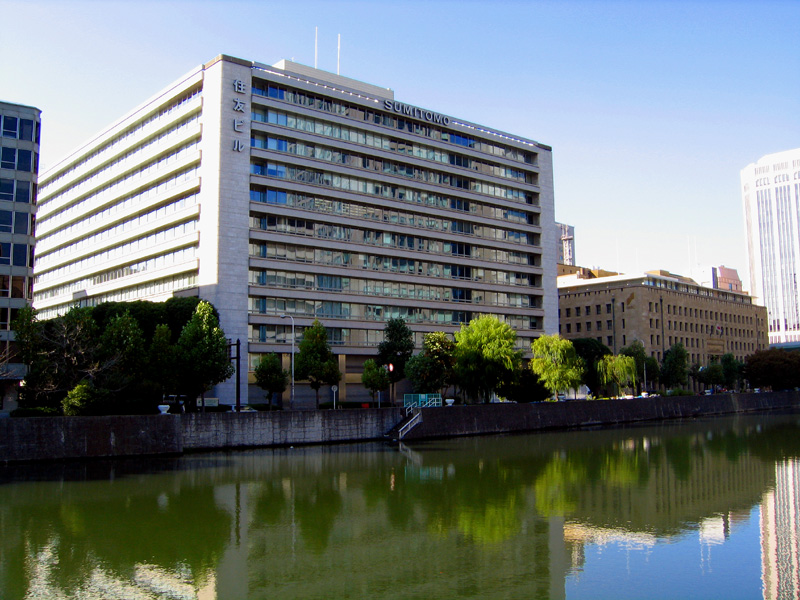
- Headquarters in Chūō-ku, Osaka
- Type: Public
- Traded as: TYO: 5802; NAG: 5802; FSE: 5802
- Industry: Non-ferrous metal
- Founded: 1897; 129 years ago
- Headquarters: Kitahama, Chūō-ku, Osaka, Japan
- Area served: Worldwide
- Key people: Osamu Inoue (president)
- Products: Automotive, Infocommunications, Electronics, Environment and Energy, Industrial Materials & Others
- Revenue: ▲¥4,005.6 billion (2022)
- Operating income: ▲¥177.4 billion (2022)
- Net income: ▲¥173.3 billion (2022)
- Total assets: ▲¥4,013.0 billion (2022)
- Total equity: ▲¥1,628.8 billion (2022)
- Number of employees: 289,191 (2023)
- Website: sumitomoelectric.com

Sumitomo Electric Industries, Ltd. (住友電気工業株式会社, Sumitomo Denki Kōgyō) is a manufacturer of electric wire and optical fiber cables. Its headquarters are in Chūō-ku, Osaka, Japan. The company's shares are listed in the first section of the Tokyo, Nagoya Stock Exchanges, and the Fukuoka Stock Exchange. In the period ending March 2021, the company reported consolidated sales of US$26.5 billion (2,918,580 million Japanese yen).

The company was founded in 1897 to produce copper wire for electrical uses. Sumitomo Electric operates in five business fields: Automotive, Information & Communications, Electronics, Environment & Energy, and Industrial materials and is developing in two others: Life Sciences and Materials & Resources. It has more than 400 subsidiaries and over 280,000 employees in more than 30 countries.

Sumitomo Electric has traditionally had an intensive focus on R&D to develop new products. Its technologies have been used in major projects including traffic control in Thailand, improvement of telecom networks in Nigeria, membrane technology for waste water treatment in Korea, and bridge construction in Germany. Sumitomo produces chips for 5G base stations.

Sumitomo Electric's electrical wiring harness systems, which are used to send information and energy to automobiles, hold the largest market share in the world. Sumitomo Electric also continues to be the leading manufacturer of composite semiconductors (GaAs, GaN, InP), which are widely used in semiconductor lasers, LEDs, and mobile telecommunications devices. The company is one of the top three manufacturers in the world of optical fiber.

Sumitomo Electric Industries is a part of the Sumitomo Group.

== History ==
=== 1897 to 1950 ===
- 1897 - Sumitomo Copper Rolling Works was founded
- 1900 - Started production of coated wires
- 1908 - Started production of power cables
- 1909 - Started trial production of telecommunication cables
- 1911 - Established Sumitomo Electric Wire & Cable Works; Laid first Japan-made high-voltage underground cables
- 1916 - Opened a new factory (now the Osaka Works); Started production of enamel wires
- 1920 - Sumitomo Electric Wire & Cable Works incorporated as a limited company
- 1931 - Started production of cemented carbide tools
- 1932 - Started production of special steel wires
- 1939 - Company name changed to the current name, Sumitomo Electric Industries, Ltd.
- 1941 - Opened the Itami Works
- 1943 - Started production of vibration-proof rubber products and fuel tanks
- 1946 - Opened a brand office in Tokyo (now the Tokyo Head Office)
- 1948 - Started marketing sintered powder metal products
- 1949 - Entered into the construction business of overhead transmission lines

=== 1951 to 2000 ===
- 1957 - Delivered the first Japan-made television broadcasting antennas
- 1961 - Opened the Yokohama Works; Delivered the wiring harnesses for four-wheel vehicles for the first time in its history
- 1962 - Started production of the Irrax Tube electron beam irradiation tubes; The head office was moved from Osaka's Konohana Ward to its present location in Chuo Ward
- 1963 - Started production of disc brakes
- 1964 - Started production of electron beam irradiation wires
- 1968 - Entered into the traffic control systems business
- 1969 - Established the first overseas production subsidiary in Thailand (SIAM Electric Industries Co., Ltd.); Started development of flexible printed circuits (FPCs)
- 1970 - Started production of compound semiconductors
- 1971 - Opened the Kanto Works
- 1974 - Started production of optical fiber cables
- 1975 - Contracted to construct a power transmission line in Iran
- 1976 - Received an order for a large telecommunications network construction project in Nigeria
- 1978 - Delivered and put into operation the world's first bidirectional fiber optics CATV system called “Hi-OVIS”
- 1981 - Delivered and installed fiber optic LAN systems for the first time in its history
- 1982 - Succeeded in producing the world's-largest-class (1.2 carats) synthetic diamonds
- 1996 - Developed a technology for producing long-length oxide high voltage superconducting wires
- 1998 - Developed and started marketing ecology wires and cables
- 1999 - Sumitomo Electric Fine Polymer, Inc. (fine polymer products) started operation

=== 2001 to present ===
- 2001 - J-Power Systems Corporation (high-voltage power cables) started operational
- 2002 - Sumitomo Electric Networks, Inc. (network equipment), Sumitomo (SEI) Steel Wire Corp. (special steel wires) and Sumitomo Electric Wintec, Inc. (magnet wires) started operation
- 2003 - Sumiden Hitachi Cable Ltd. (wires and cables for buildings and industrial equipment) and Sumitomo Electric Hardmetal Corp. (powder metal and diamond products) started operation
- 2004 - A.L.M.T. Corp. was made a wholly owned subsidiary
- 2006 - The HTS cable used in a power transmission grid in the U.S. started supplying electricity
- 2007 - Sumitomo Wiring Systems, Ltd. was made a wholly owned subsidiary; Nissin Electric Co., Ltd. was made a consolidated subsidiary
- 2008 - Opened Technical Training Center
- 2009 - Eudyna Devices Inc. was made a wholly owned subsidiary and changed its trade name to Sumitomo Electric Device Innovations, Inc.
- 2010 - Opened WinD Lab, a new laboratory building; SEI Optifrontier Co., Ltd. Started lightwave network product business
- 2011 - Commenced “Demonstration of Megawatt-Class Power Generation/Storage System” at Osaka Works, and at Yokohama Works in 2012
- 2012 - Obtained the world's first certification of Thunderbolt, an optical cable which began commercial production; Established joint research on “Commercialization and Construction Technology for Offshore Wind Power Generation Plants Regional Promotion Aqua-Wind Commercialization Study Group.”
- 2013 - Constructed manufacturing base for automotive aluminum electric wire in Thailand.

== Business units ==
Sumitomo Electric and its global subsidiaries and affiliates undertake product development, manufacturing and marketing, as well as service provision in the five business divisions: “Automotive,” “Infocommunications,” “Electronics,” “Environment and Energy,” and “Industrial Materials & Others.”

=== Automotive ===
The automotive segment accounts for 50% of Sumitomo Electric's annual sales. With the aim of realizing an automotive society characterized by safety, comfort, and environmental responsibility, Sumitomo Electric supplies the global market with a broad range of products, including wiring harnesses for in-vehicle data and energy transmission, and anti-vibration rubber.

The automotive wiring harness business commenced in 1949 with supplies to the Occupation Forces for their jeeps. In 1961, for the first time, the company supplied wiring harnesses for four-wheel-drive vehicles. At present, Sumitomo Electric promotes the automotive wiring harness business in a tripartite system, in which Sumitomo Electric takes charge of sales and business planning, Sumitomo Wiring Systems handles design and manufacturing, and AutoNetworks Technologies conduct research and development. As a result, Sumitomo Electric's electrical wiring harness systems, which are used to send information and energy to automobiles, have garnered the second largest market share in the world.

=== Info-communications ===
This segment provides key products and devices that support optical communications, such as optical fibers, cables, connectors, fusion splicers, GE-PON (Gigabit Ethernet Passive Optical Network) devices, various network access equipment, as well as electronic devices and antenna products for wireless communications. The division also provides various products for supporting the Information and Communication Technology (ICT) society such as traffic control systems and other intelligent transportation system (ITS) devices.

Sumitomo Electric produced optical fiber well ahead of other manufacturers, taking note of the product's capacity for data transmission, ideal for the advanced information age that was to come. In 1986, Sumitomo Electric developed Z-fiber, pure silica core fiber with the world's lowest transmission loss. This has supported the construction of optical communication networks, such as its wide use in many submarine cables.

=== Electronics ===
The Sumitomo Electric Group's electronics division supplies various products to manufacturers of smartphones, flat-screen televisions, and other advanced electronic goods. Products include base material, wiring, and components for compact and lightweight devices with high functionality, such as flexible printed circuits (FPCs), electronic wires, heat-shrinkable tubing, fine polymer products, and compound semiconductors. Capitalizing on compound semiconductor development and manufacturing-knowledge accumulated over many years, Sumitomo Electric succeeded in developing and mass-producing the world's first gallium nitride substances. Sumitomo Electric also continues to be the leading manufacturer of composite semiconductors (GaAs, GaN, InP), which are widely used in semiconductor lasers, LEDs, and mobile telecommunications devices.

=== Environment and Energy ===
This division provides electric wire and cable products that underpin stable energy supply. They include copper wire rods from which various types of electric wires and cables are made, power cables that are indispensable for the supply of high-voltage electricity, and trolley wires for railways. This business segment also supplies magnet wires used in household appliances, automotive electric components, and industrial motors- including hybrid products of rubber, plastic, and ceramics resulting from our development of wire coating technologies- to many different branches of industry.

=== Industrial Materials ===
Hard metal products, such as cutting tools, are essential for high-speed, high-performance, and high-precision mechanical processing. This division manufactures products used in many industries, including special metal wires for prestressed concrete used in civil engineering and construction projects; special steel wires such as steel cords used as tire-reinforcement materials in the automobile industry; and oil-tempered wires for valve springs. This division also makes sintered parts that are used as structural components in automobiles and home electric appliances.

== Projects ==
=== Americas ===
- Argentina – Optical Cable System
- Brazil – Automotive Wiring Harness Business
- Mexico – Submarine and underground power transmission installation project
- USA – Restoration of I-35 W Highway Bridge, Superconducting Cable Demonstration Test

=== Middle East ===
- Iran – Major power transmission line installation project

=== Asia ===
- China – Establishment of optical fiber product joint ventures with Futong Group
- India - Sumitomo Riko Co. Ltd.(Formally Tokai Rubber Industries) which produces rubber hose and other synthetic resin products
- Japan – World’s first superconducting electric car
- Korea – Membrane Technology for waste water treatment
- Taiwan – contribution to Taiwan’s high-speed Shinkansen Bullet Train
- Thailand – Easing traffic jam, First overseas manufacturing base
- Vietnam – New business center for electronic products
- Malaysia - Sumitomo Electric Wintec Sdn Bhd

=== Europe ===
- Germany – Introduction of new bridge building method
- UK – SUMICRYSTAL: Synthetic Single Crystal Diamond
- Russia – communications equipment and electric wire business

=== Africa ===
- Nigeria – Telecom network project.
- Morocco - SEWS.
- Tunisia - SEWS.

=== Oceania ===
- Australia- Long-distance underground power transmission lines

== See also ==
- Sumiflon
