= Mount Nakayama =

Mountain in Hyōgo Prefecture, Japan

- 中山
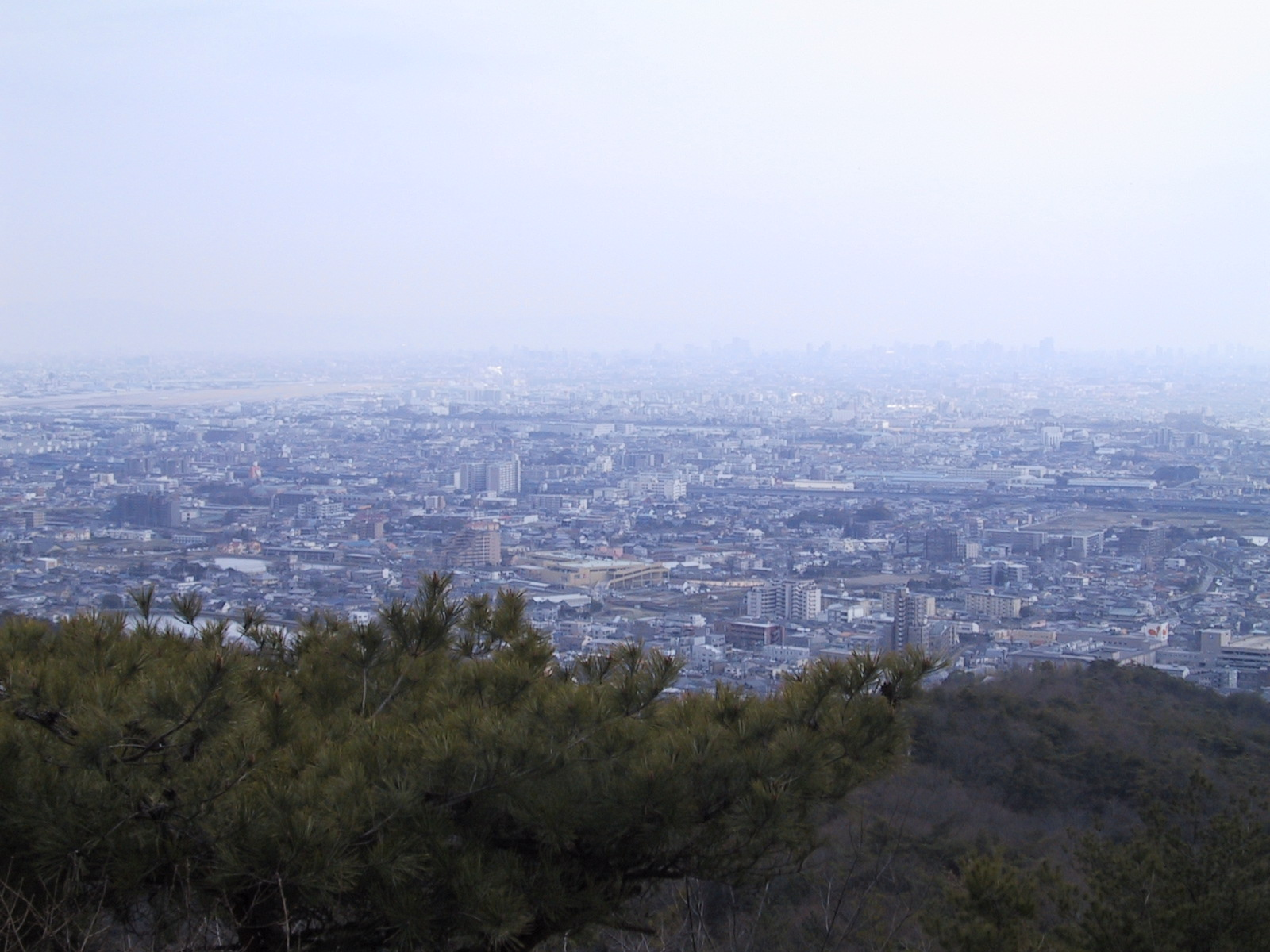
- A View from the Mountain

Highest point
- Elevation: 478.0 m (1,568.2 ft)
- Coordinates: 34°50.40′N 135°21.18′E

Geography
- Location: Takarazuka, Hyōgo, Japan
- Parent range: Nakayama Mountains

Mount Nakayama (中山, Nakayama) is a mountain in Takarazuka, Hyōgo Prefecture, Japan.

== Location ==
It is located west side of the city, and has a Nakayamadera temple in front of it. The height of the mountain is 478 meters, but this mountain is very popular for hikers around Osaka-Kobe Area, because of the great view of Osaka metropolitan area from the top of the mountain. This mountain also has good connections to the railway stations.

== Access ==
- Nakayama-kannon Station of Hankyu Takarazuka Line
- Nakayamadera Station of Fukuchiyama Line.
