= Nakayamasōen Kofun =

Burial mound in Japan

- 中山荘園古墳 (Japanese)
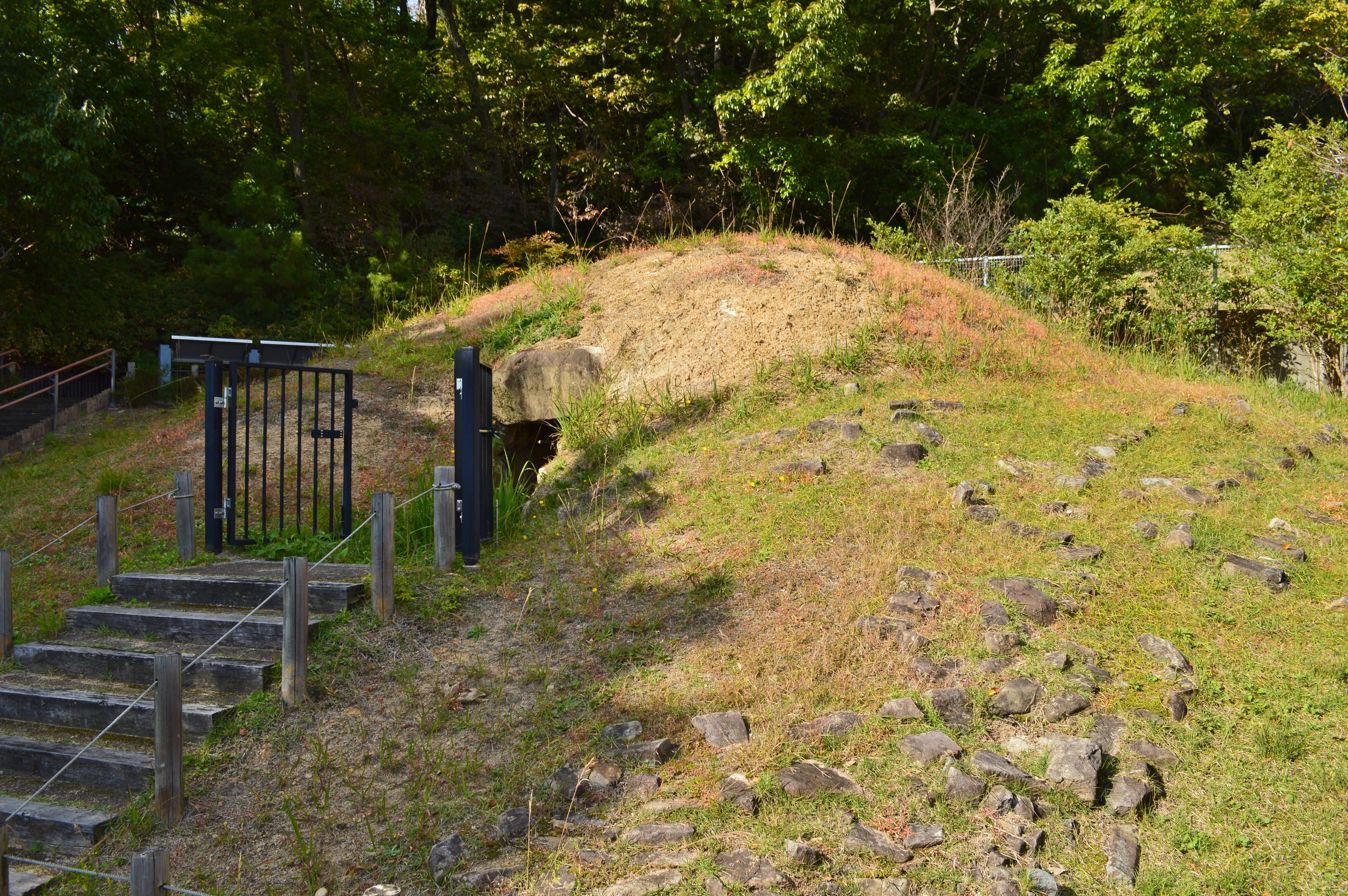
- Nakayamasōen Kofun

- Nakayamasōen Kofun Nakayamasōen Kofun (Japan)
- Interactive map of Nakayamasōen Kofun
- 34°49′12.38″N 135°21′47.43″E
- Type: Kofun
- Periods: Kofun period
- Location: Takarazuka, Hyōgo, Japan
- Region: Kansai region

History
- Built: mid-7th century

Site notes
- Public access: Yes (no facilities)

Nakayamasōen Kofun (中山荘園古墳) is an Asuka period burial mound, located in the Nakayamasōen neighborhood of the city of Takarazuka, Hyōgo in the Kansai region of Japan. The tumulus was designated a National Historic Site of Japan in 1999.

== Overview ==
The Nakayamasōen Kofun is a very rare hakkaku-fun (八角墳), which is octagonal. It is located at the tip of a ridge extending southward from the western part of the hills of Mt. Nagao in eastern Hyōgo Prefecture. It was discovered in 1982 and an archaeological excavation was conducted from 1983 to 1984. The tumulus has a diagonal length of about 13 meters and a height of about 2.6 meters. It is surrounded by two rows of octagonal outer guard stones on each side, and a terrace-like facility that is thought to be an altar on the south side. The burial chamber is a small horizontal stone chamber orientated to the south. No grave goods have been found. From the end of the 6th century to the beginning of the 7th century, keyhole-shaped burial mounds (zenpō-kōen-fun) were no longer built, and the number of burial mounds for chieftains decreased considerably, but most of them, including the imperial mausoleum, were square-type hōfun (方墳). Of the over 160,000 kofun in Japan, only 17 are octagonal burial mounds, accounting for less than one percent, and most of these were constructed in the middle of the 7th century, and were the tombs for emperors. Although the person buried in this tumulus is unknown, the location is near the Mefu Jinja, which was serving the Wakayuza-branch of the Mononobe clan during this period.

The tumulus is about a 10-minute walk from Mefujinja Station on the Hankyu Takarazuka Main Line.

== Gallery ==
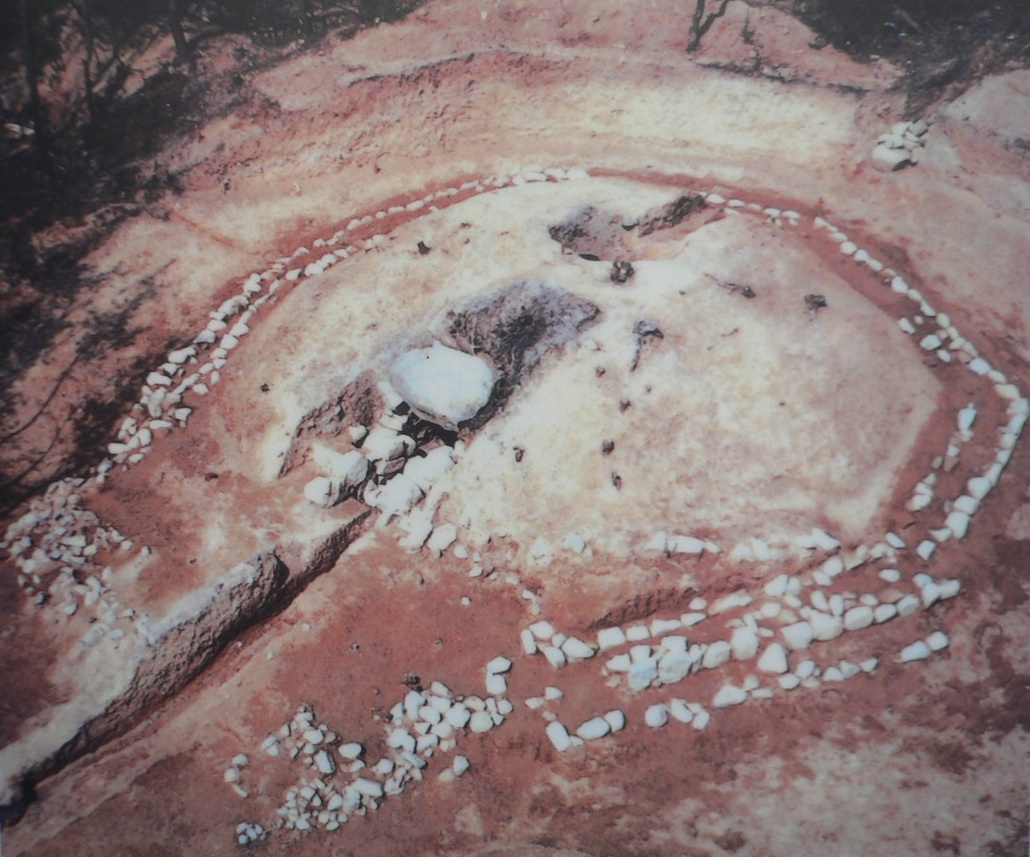
During excavation

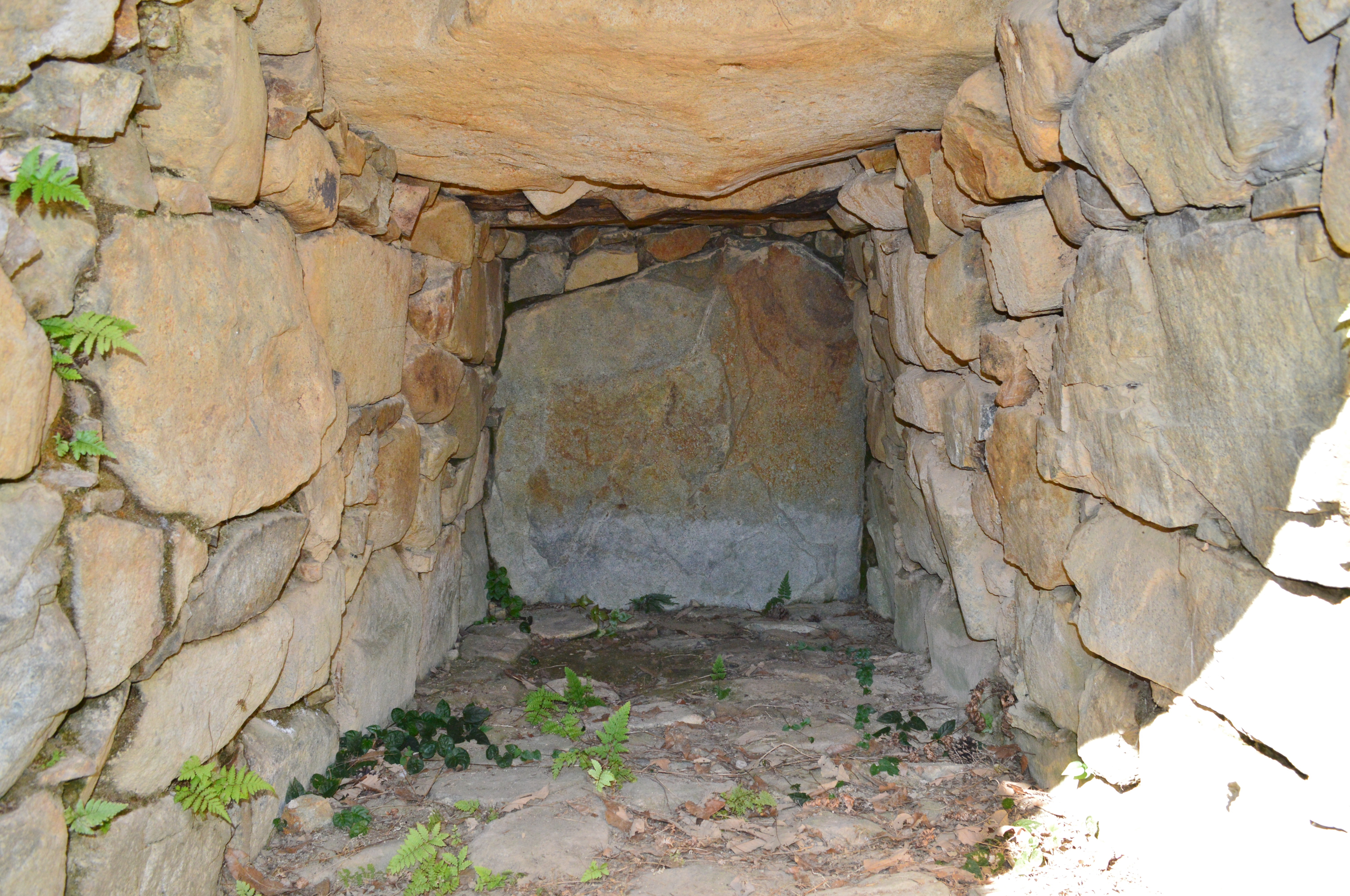
Burial Chamber

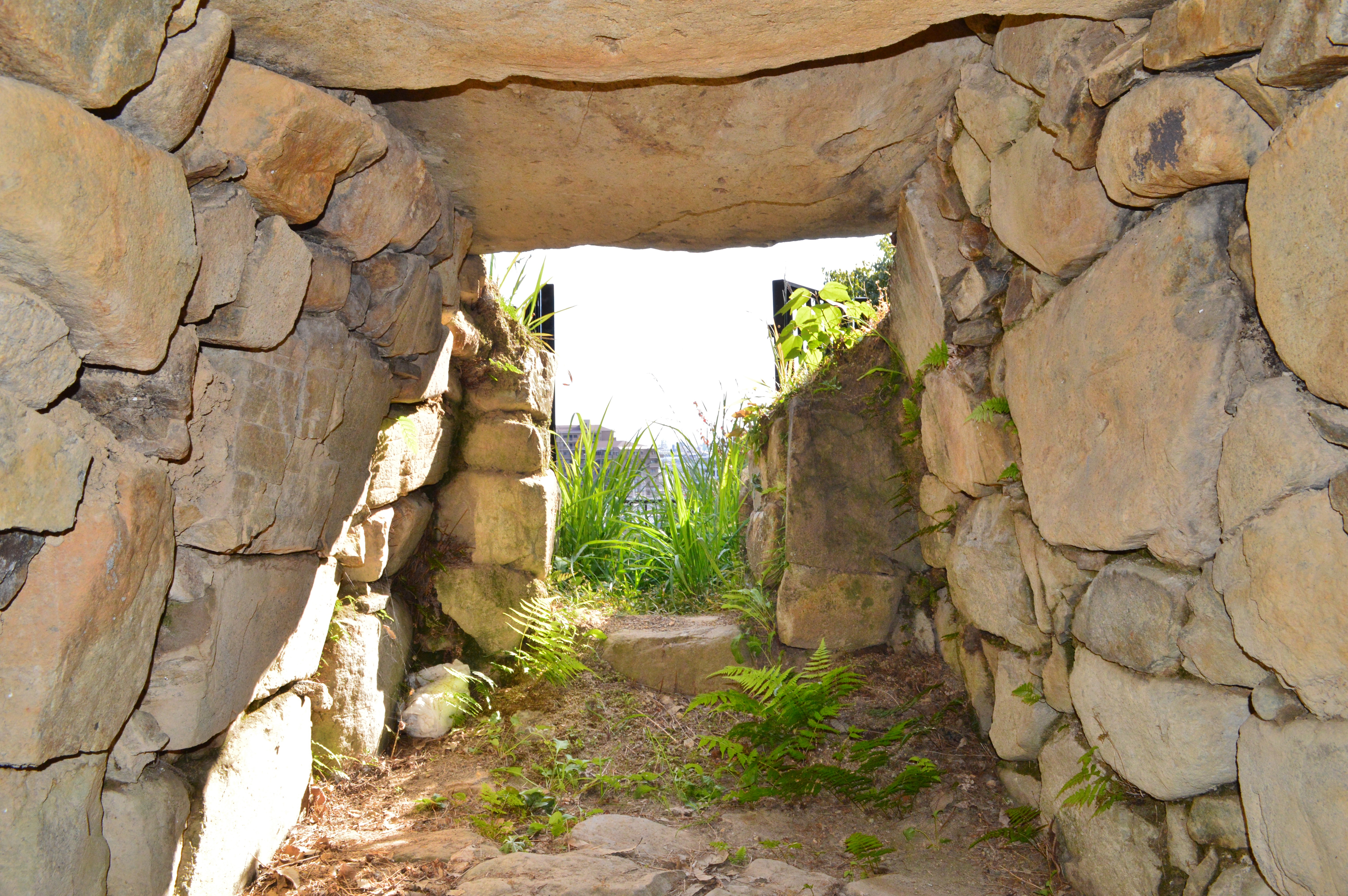
BurialChamber

== See also ==
- List of Historic Sites of Japan (Hyōgo)
