= Heirin-ji (Hyōgo) =

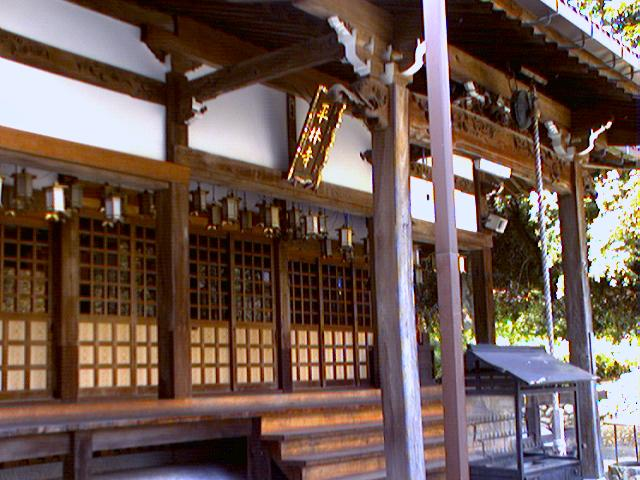

Heirinji (平林寺) is a Buddhist temple in Takarazuka, Hyōgo, Japan.

== Object of Worship ==
- Seated figure of Gautama Buddha (釈迦如来坐像 Shaka Nyorai Zazō)

== History ==
According to the official history (engi) of the temple, the temple was founded by Prince Shotoku under the order of the Emperor Yomei. During Edo period, it was noted as one of the seven great temples in Muko region of Settsu Province.

The sango, or the mountain name assigned to the temple, of this temple is Mukozan, an old name for Mount Rokkō.

When the temple was the most prosperous, the temple is said to have more than 30 buildings, however the temple was burned by Araki Murashige in the war with Oda Nobunaga in the 16th century.

== Access ==
- Sakasegawa Station of Hankyu Imazu Line

== References and external links ==
- Heirin-ji, Kansai Digital Archive (Japanese)

34°47′42″N 135°21′03″E
