= HI-LEX =

Japanese manufacturer

HI-LEX CORPORATION
- Company type: Public company KK
- Traded as: TYO: 7279; OSE: 7279
- Industry: Machinery
- Founded: Takarazuka, Japan (January 20, 1946)
- Headquarters: 1-12-28, Sakaemachi, Takarazuka, Hyogo 665-0845 Japan
- Key people: Makoto Teraura (CEO and President)
- Products: Gate systems for automobiles; Micro control cables; Parking brake cables; Power lift gate systems; Transmission control cables; Window regulators
- Revenue: ▲$ 1.75 billion (FY 2013) (¥ 164.956 billion) (FY 2013)
- Net income: ▲$113 million (FY 2013) (¥ 10.623 billion) (FY 2013)
- Number of employees: 13,289 (as of October 2019)
- Website: Official website

HI-LEX Corporation (株式会社ハイレックスコーポレーション, Hairekkusu Kōporēshon Kabushiki-gaisha) is a Japanese corporation specializing in the manufacture and sale of remote-controlling mechanical cables and accessories for two-and four-wheel vehicles, construction and industrial machinery, household and welfare appliances, medical equipment and marine vessels.

The company is listed on the Tokyo Stock Exchange and the Osaka Securities Exchange and as of October 31, 2012 the company has 26 subsidiaries.

In Japan the company has offices in Takarazuka, Tokyo, Nagoya and Hiroshima, factories in Takarazuka, Tamba, Sanda, Hamamatsu, Toyooka, Hamada, Honjo, Mobara, technical center in Utsunomiya and research center in Suwa.

Overseas it has factories and offices in Germany, Hungary, China, India, Indonesia, Vietnam, Thailand, South Korea, UK, Italy, the United States and Mexico.

In 2016, the launch of production in Tolyatti, Russia.
