= Kiyoshikōjin Station =

Railway station in Takarazuka, Hyōgo Prefecture, Japan

Kiyoshikōjin Station 清荒神駅
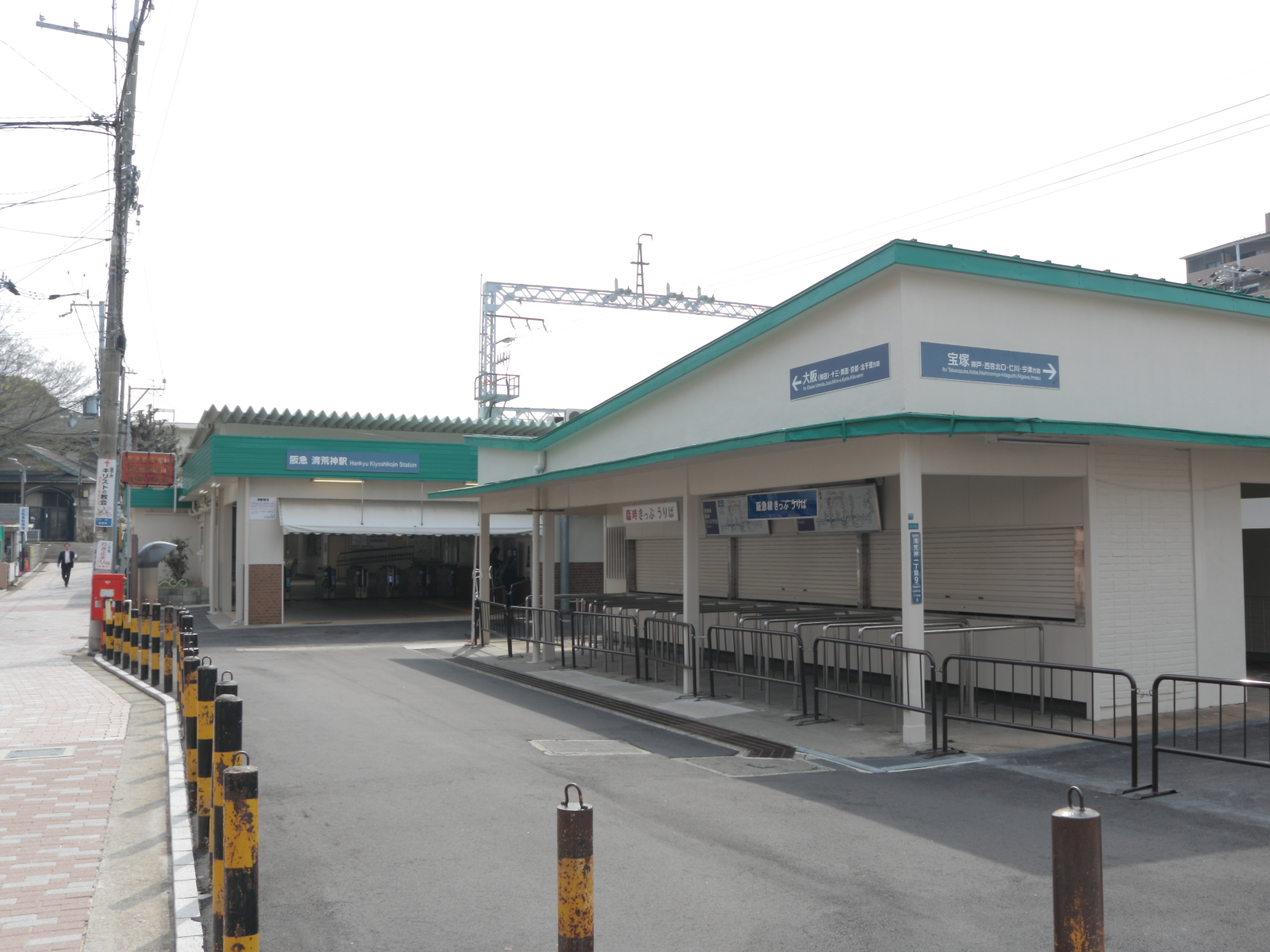
- Kiyoshikōjin Station building, April 2016

General information
- Location: 1-chōme-9 Kiyoshikōjin, Takarazuka-shi, Hyōgo-ken 665-0836; Japan
- Coordinates: 34°48′41.01″N 135°21′11.84″E
- Operator: Hankyu Railway
- Line: ■ Takarazuka Main Line
- Distance: 23.3 km (14.5 miles) from Osaka-umeda
- Platforms: 2 side platforms
- Tracks: 2

Other information
- Status: Staffed
- Station code: HK-55
- Website: Official website

History
- Opened: March 10, 1910

Passengers
- FY2019: 8,245 daily

Services
Preceding station	Hankyu Railway	Following station
Mefu-Jinja towards Osaka-umeda	Takarazuka Main Line Local Express	Takarazuka Terminus
Mefu-Jinja towards Osaka-umeda	Takarazuka Main Line Semi-Express	Takarazuka One-way operation
Location
- Location within Hyōgo Prefecture Location within Japan

Kiyoshikōjin Station (清荒神駅, Kiyoshikōjin-eki; station number: HK-55) is a passenger railway station located in the city of Takarazuka Hyōgo Prefecture, Japan. It is operated by the private transportation company Hankyu Railway.

== Lines ==
Kiyoshikōjin Station is served by the Hankyu Takarazuka Line, and is located 23.3 kilometers from the terminus of the line at Osaka-umeda.

== Layout ==
The station consists of two opposed side platforms, connected by an underground passage.

=== Platforms ===
1	■ Takarazuka Line	for Takarazuka, Nishinomiya-Kitaguchi, Imazu and Kōbe
2	■ Takarazuka Line	for Ōsaka (Umeda), Minoo, Kyōto and Kita-Senri

== History ==
Kiyoshikōjin station opened on March 10, 1910, the day the Takarazuka Line started operation.

== Passenger statistics ==
In fiscal 2019, the station was used by an average of 8,245 passengers daily

== Surrounding area ==
- Kiyoshikōjin Seichō-ji
- Takarazuka City Central Library

== See also ==
- List of railway stations in Japan
