= Takarazuka-Minamiguchi Station =

Railway station in Takarazuka, Hyōgo Prefecture, Japan

Takarazuka-Minamiguchi Station 宝塚南口駅
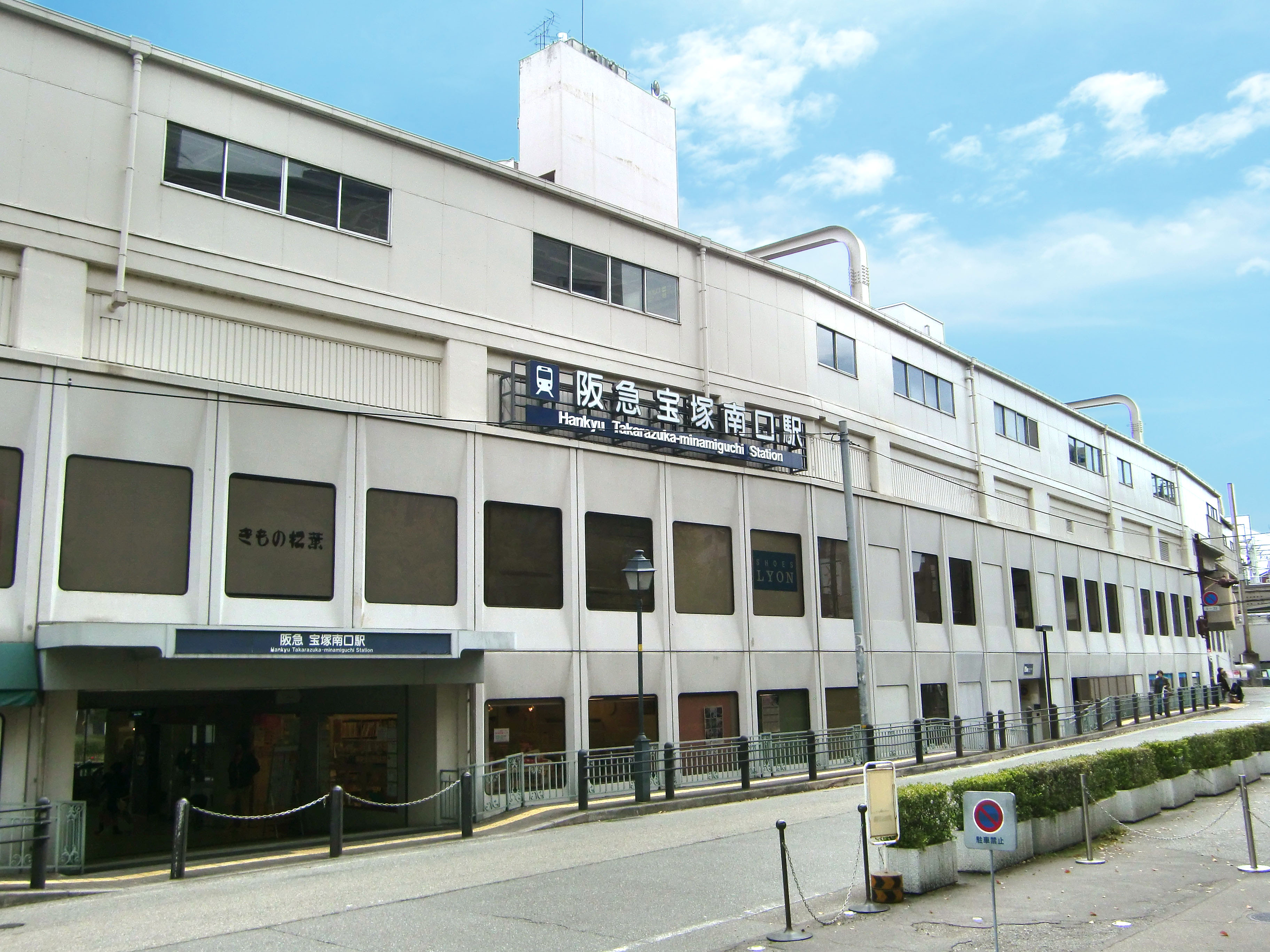
- Takarazuka-Minamiguchi Station West Exit, 2010

General information
- Location: 1 Umenochō, Takarazuka-shi, Hyōgo-ken 665-0004; Japan
- Coordinates: 34°48′15.08″N 135°20′45.29″E
- Operator: Hankyu Railway.
- Line: ■ Hankyu Imazu Line
- Distance: 0.9 km (0.56 miles) from Takarazuka
- Platforms: 2 side platforms
- Tracks: 2

Other information
- Status: Staffed
- Station code: HK-28
- Website: Official website

History
- Opened: September 2, 1921

Passengers
- FY2019: 12,769 daily
Location
- Location within Hyōgo Prefecture Location within Japan

Takarazuka-Minamiguchi Station (宝塚南口駅, Takarazuka-minamiguchi-eki; station number: HK-28) is a passenger railway station located in the city of Takarazuka Hyōgo Prefecture, Japan. It is operated by the private transportation company Hankyu Railway.

== Lines ==
Takarazuka-Minamiguchi Station is served by the Hankyu Imazu Line, and is located 0.9 kilometers from the terminus of the line at Takarazuka and 22.4kilometers from Osaka-umeda.

== Layout ==
The station consists of two opposed elevated side platforms, with the station building underneath.

=== Platforms ===
1	■ Imazu Line	for Takarazuka
2	■ Imazu Line	for Nishinomiya-Kitaguchi

== Adjacent stations ==
«	Service	»
Takarazuka	Local	Sakasegawa
Takarazuka	Semi-Express (only running for Umeda)	Sakasegawa
Takarazuka	Arashiyama Limited Express (Extra)	Sakasegawa

== History ==
Takarazuka-Minamiguchi Station opened on September 2, 1921.

== Passenger statistics ==
In fiscal 2019, the station was used by an average of 12,769 passengers daily

== Surrounding area ==
- Takarazuka Hotel
- Takarazuka Music School
- Takarazuka Grand Theater, Takarazuka Bow Hall
- The Osamu Tezuka Manga Museum
- Mukogawa River

== See also ==
- List of railway stations in Japan
