= Koshien University =

Higher education institution in Hyōgo Prefecture, Japan

Coordinates: 34°48′23″N 135°20′01″E

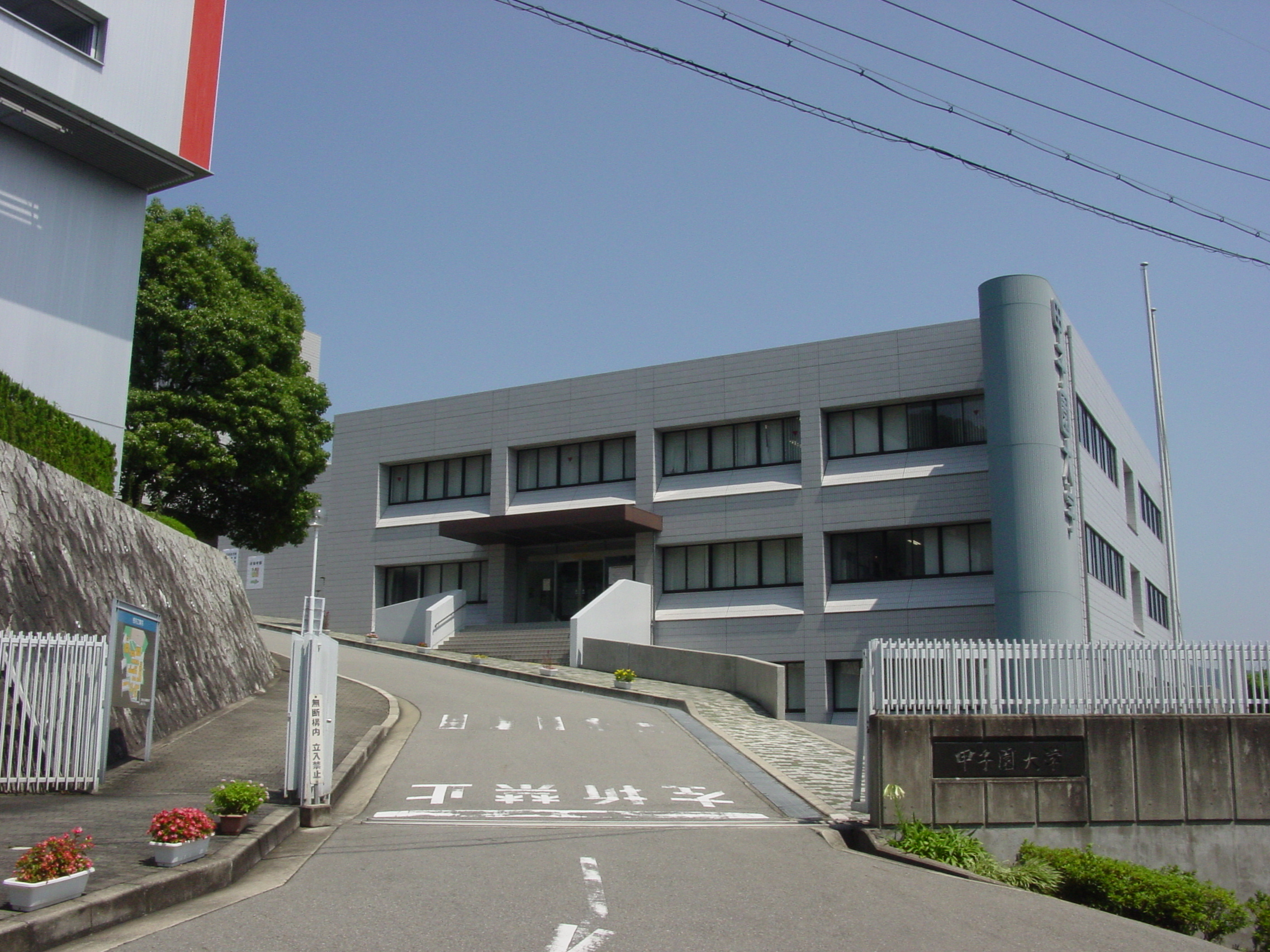
Koshien University

Koshien University (甲子園大学, Köshien daigaku) is a private university in Takarazuka, Hyōgo, Japan. The predecessor of the school was founded in 1941, and it was chartered as a university in 1967.
