= Nakayama-kannon Station =

Railway station in Takarazuka, Hyōgo Prefecture, Japan

Nakayama-kannon Station 中山観音駅
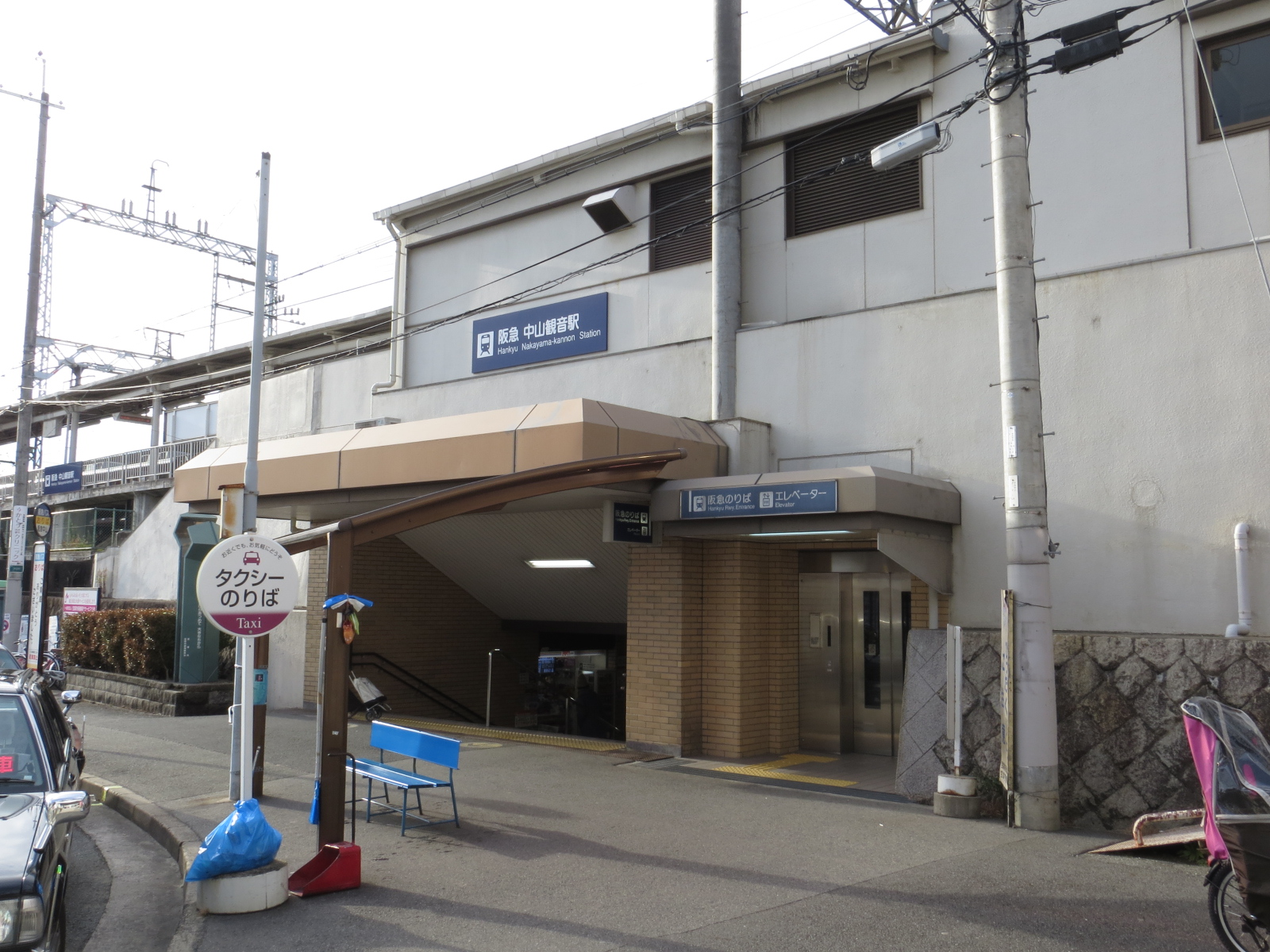
- Station building, January 2014

General information
- Location: 2-7-1 Nakayamadera,, Takarazuka-she, Hyōgo-ken; Japan
- Coordinates: 34°49′37.95″N 135°24′8.68″E
- Operator: Hankyu Railway
- Line: ■ Takarazuka Main Line
- Distance: 21.5 km (13.4 miles) from Osaka-umeda
- Platforms: 2 side platforms

Other information
- Status: Staffed
- Station code: HK53
- Website: Official website

History
- Opened: 10 March 1910
- Former names: Nakayama (to 2013)

Passengers
- FY2019: 11,994 daily

Services
Preceding station	Hankyu Railway	Following station
Yamamoto towards Osaka-umeda	Takarazuka Main Line Local Express	Mefu-Jinja towards Takarazuka
Yamamoto towards Osaka-umeda	Takarazuka Main Line Semi-Express	Mefu-Jinja One-way operation
Location
- Location within Hyōgo Prefecture Location within Japan

Nakayama-kannon Station (中山観音駅, Nakayama-kannon-eki; station number: HK-53) is a passenger railway station located in the city of Takarazuka Hyōgo Prefecture, Japan. It is operated by the private transportation company Hankyu Railway.

== Lines ==
Nakayama-kannon Station is served by the Hankyu Takarazuka Line, and is located 21.5 kilometers from the terminus of the line at Osaka-umeda.

== Station layout ==
The station two elevated side platforms, with the station building underneath.

=== Platforms ===
1	■ Takarazuka Line	for Takarazuka, Nishinomiya-Kitaguchi, Imazu and Kōbe
2	■ Takarazuka Line	for Ōsaka (Umeda), Minoo, Kyōto and Kita-Senri

== History ==
Nakayama-kannon Station opened on March 10, 1910, as Nakayama Station (中山駅, Nakayama-eki), It was renamed on December 21, 2013.

== Passenger statistics ==
In fiscal 2019, the station was used by an average of 11,994 passengers daily

== Surrounding area ==
- Nakayama-dera
- Nakayamadera Station (JR West)

== See also ==
- List of railway stations in Japan
