= Kiyoshikōjin Seichō-ji =

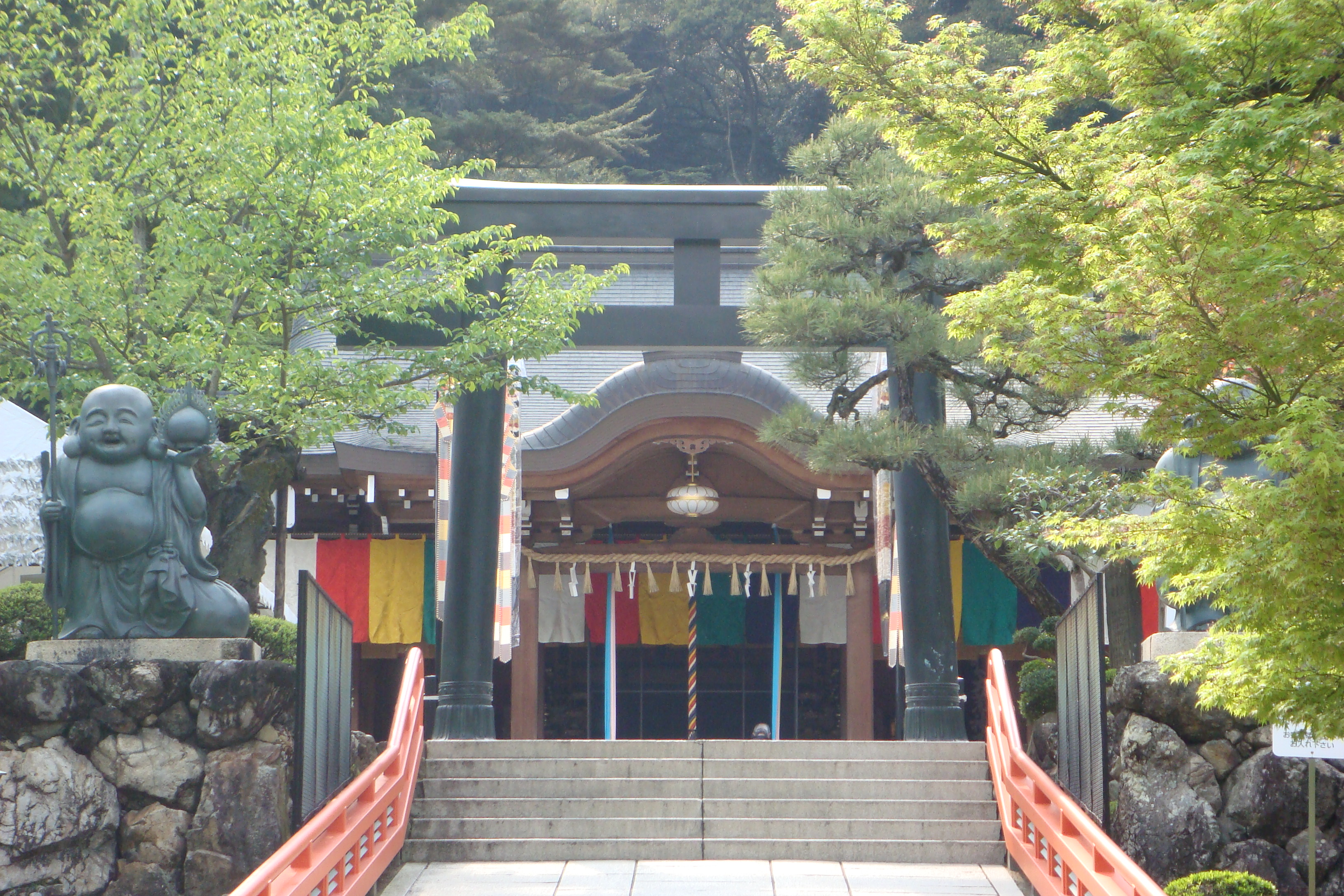
Kiyoshikōjin Seichō-ji

Kiyoshikōjin Seichō-ji (清荒神清澄寺) is a Shingon Buddhist temple in Takarazuka, Hyōgo, Japan. It is one of the typical type of mixture of Shinto and Buddhism temples in Japan, and temple's name has two Chinese letters of two religions in Japan together, 'Jin'(神) of Shinto and 'Ji'(寺) of Buddhism. This type of mixture of two religions, called 'Shinbutsu shugo'(神仏習合) was very common among Japanese temples or shrines until the Edo period, but the two religions were formally and forcedly separated by Meiji Government in the last half of the 19th century. In this sense, this temple is a good example that still preserves Japanese religious traditions before modernization.

Kiyoshikojin deals with fire, which is indispensable to people’s lives, has been respected as something sacred. Kiyoshikojin gives us benefits such as family safety, business and good luck.

== History ==
Kiyoshikōjin Seichō-ji is established in 896 by monk Seikan (静観僧正, Seikan Sōjō) according to the order of Emperor Uda. This temple met fire twice in the history. In the 12th century, it was destroyed by the fire in the war between Genji(源氏) clan and Heike clan(平家), however, rebuilt by General Yoritomo Minamoto in 1193. In the 16th century, this temple was again burned in the fire of war between a daimyō, Murashige Araki of Itami Castle, and famous Nobunaga Oda, in the process of re-unification of Japan by Nobunaga.

== Object of Worship ==
- Kōjin (kami of fire and hearth
- Dainichi-Nyorai (Mahāvairocana, 大日如来)

== Cultural Property ==
This temple has an Important Cultural Property selected by the Japanese government.

- Dainichi-Nyorai (Mahāvairocana, 大日如来)

== Directions ==
- Kiyoshikōjin Station of Hankyu Takarazuka Line
