= Nakayama-dera =

Buddhist temple in Takarazuka, Hyōgo, Japan

- 中山寺
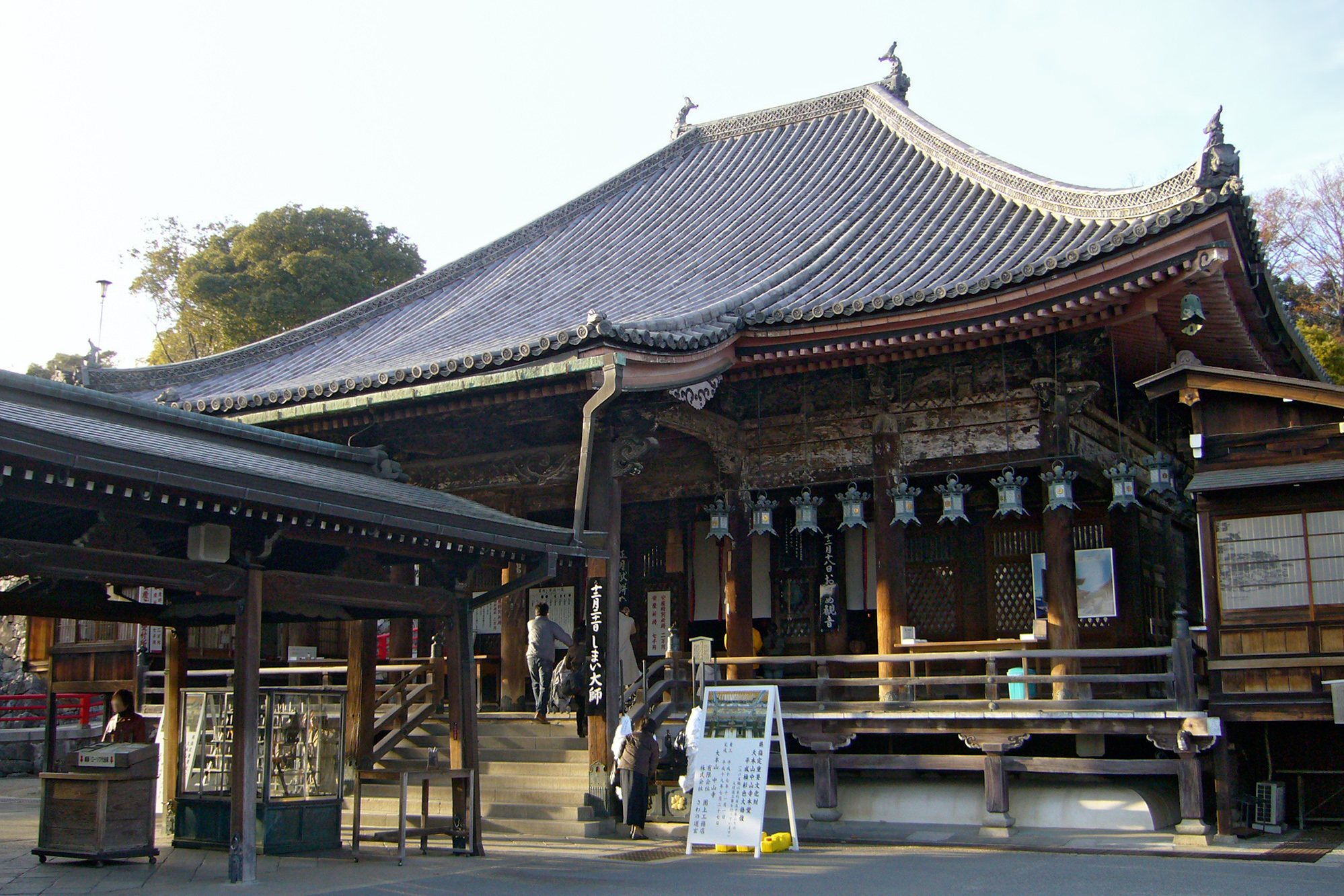
- Nakayama-dera Hondō

- Location within Hyōgo Prefecture Location within Japan

Religion
- Affiliation: Buddhist
- Deity: Jūichimen Kannon
- Rite: Shingon
- Status: functional

Location
- Location: 2-11-1 Nakayamadera, Nishikyo-ku, Takarazuka-shi, Hyōgo-ken
- Coordinates: 34°49′18.0″N 135°22′3.6″E

Architecture
- Founder: c.Prince Shōtoku
- Completed: Asuka period

Website
- Official website
- National Important Cultural Property

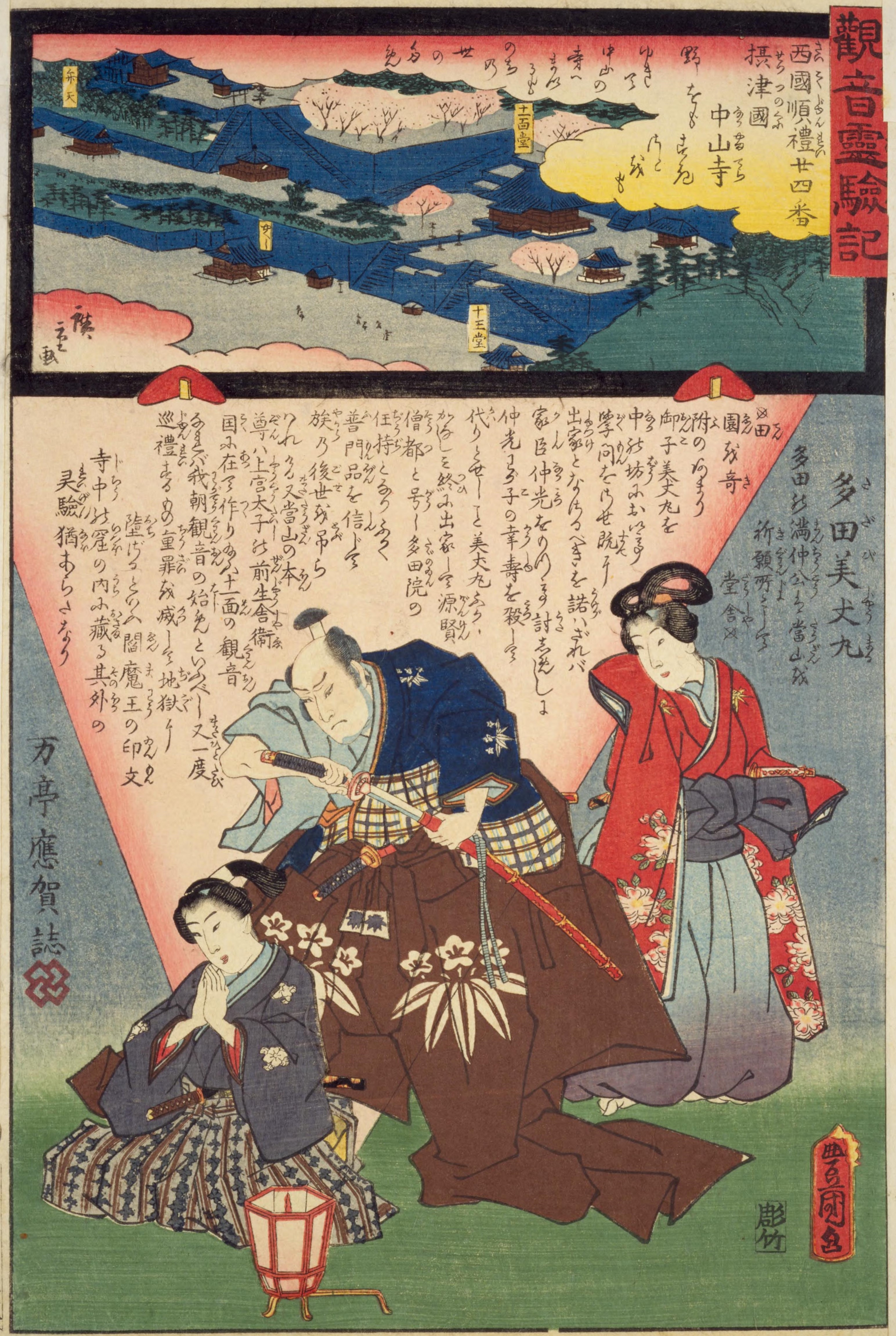
from the picture album "Kannon Reigen ki"

Nakayama-dera (中山寺) is a Buddhist temple located in the Nakayamadera neighborhood of Takarazuka, Hyōgo Prefecture Japan. It belongs to the Nakayama-branch of the Shingon sect of Japanese Buddhism and its honzon is a statue of Jūichimen Kannon. The temple's full name is Shiun-san Nakayama-dera (紫雲山 中山寺). The temple is the 24th stop on the Saigoku Kannon Pilgrimage route. The hibutsu principal image said to have come from the Three Kingdoms of Korea and was modeled after the Indian Queen Shoumanbunin (the wife of King Pasenadi of Kosala The two attendant statues on either side are also Jūichimen Kannon, making the total number of faces of the principal image and attendant statues thirty-three. Worshipping this statue is said to grant the same merit as completing the pilgrimage to the Thirty-Three Temples. The temple is also famous for praying for safe childbirth. The temple is also known as a famous plum blossom viewing spot.

== Overview ==
The origin of Nakayama-dera is uncertain. According to temple legend, Emperor Ōjin established a place of worship on this site to enshrine the spirits of Prince Kagosaka and Prince Oshikuma, the sons of Emperor Chūai. Prince Shōtoku later founded the temple to appease the spirits of Mononobe no Moriya, who was defeated by Soga no Umako and Prince Shōtoku, as well as the spirits of Prince Kagosaka and Prince Oshikuma. The original site is where the temple's Oku-no-in sanctuary is currently located, in the mountain behind the current temple complex. The worship hall was built to encompass a cave in the large rock where Prince Kagosaka's spirit is enshrined.

In 718, the priest Tokudo of Hase-dera in Yamato Province received a sacred seal from Emma, king of the underworld, who instructed him to "spread the faith in Kannon." Tokudo is said to have placed the sacred seal in a stone chest in a sarcophagus within the Shiratorizuka Kofun in Harima Province. Tokudo tried to popularize Kannon pilgrimages but was unsuccessful. Approximately 270 years later, during the Heian period, cloistered Emperor Kazan discovered the seal in the stone chest and revived the Saigoku Thirty-three Kannon Pilgrimage, with this temple designated as the 24th temple in the circuit.

At the end of the Heian period, Tada Yukitsuna was troubled by his wife's unbelief. The Kannon at this temple converted her with the "bell rope" (the rope used to ring a bell), and the couple became happy again. From then on, pilgrimages to this temple for fertility and safe childbirth gained popularity, and the temple has attracted devotion from the imperial family, aristocrats, samurai such as Minamoto no Yoritomo, and commoners as a sacred place for prayers for safe childbirth. However, the entire temple complex was burned down in the Battle of Arioka Castle between Araki Murashige and Oda Nobunaga, in 1578. The childless Toyotomi Hideyoshi prayed fervently at the temple during the Azuchi-Momoyama period, and credited it with the birth of his heir Toyotomi Hideyori. The temple was relocated to its current location during the Keichō era (1596-1615), and in 1603, Toyotomi Hideyori, with Katagiri Katsumoto as construction commissioner, rebuilt the main hall, Goma-dō, Amida-dō, and other buildings. At the end of the Bakumatsu period, Nakayama Yoshiko prayed for safe childbirth at the temple, resulting in a safe birth of Emperor Meiji.

The Great Hanshin earthquake of 1995, damaged many of the temple's buildings and the Tahōtō pagoda "Daigan-tō," was rebuilt in 2007, and the five-story pagoda, "Seiryu-tō," was rebuilt in 2017.

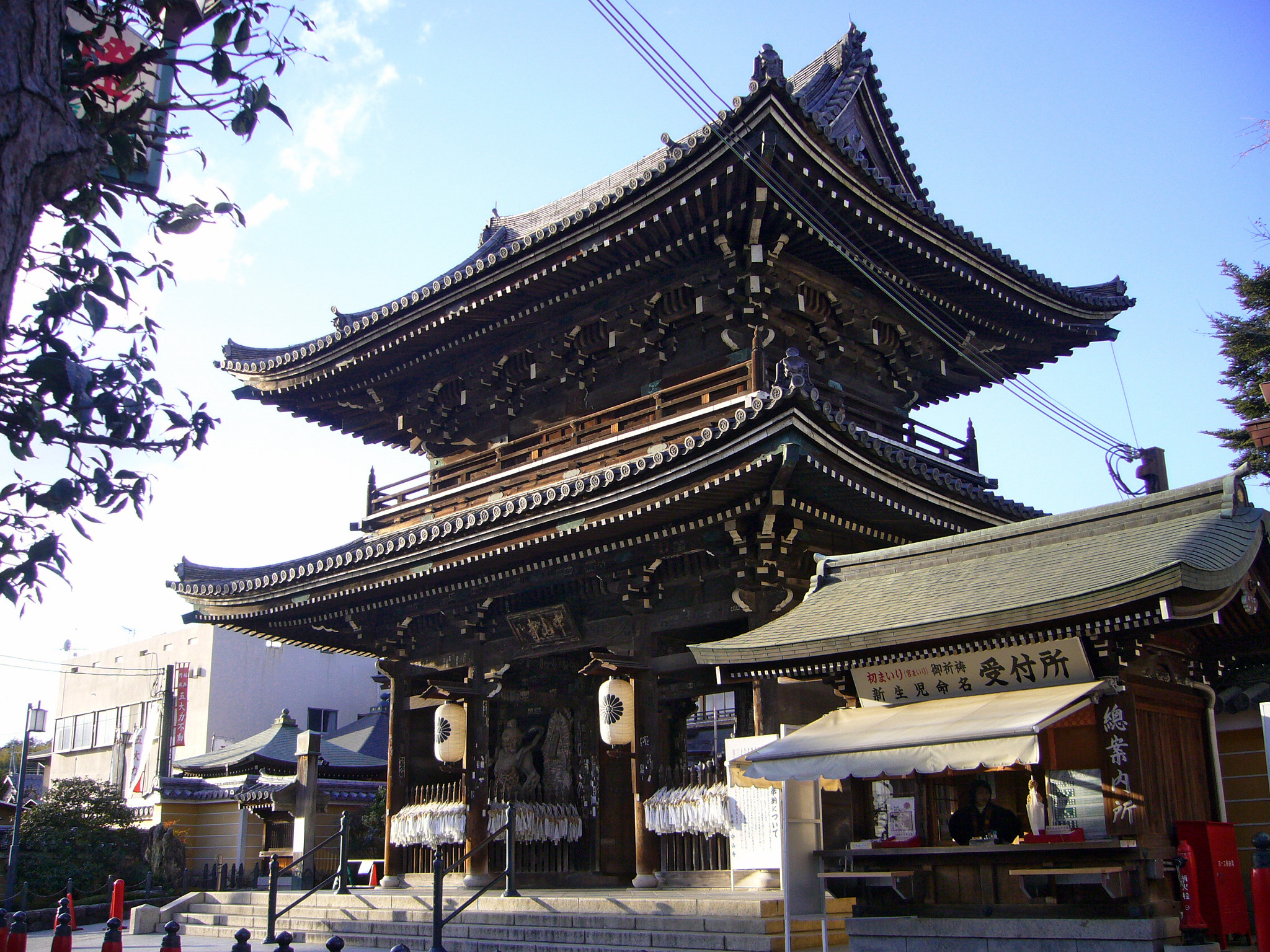
Sanmon

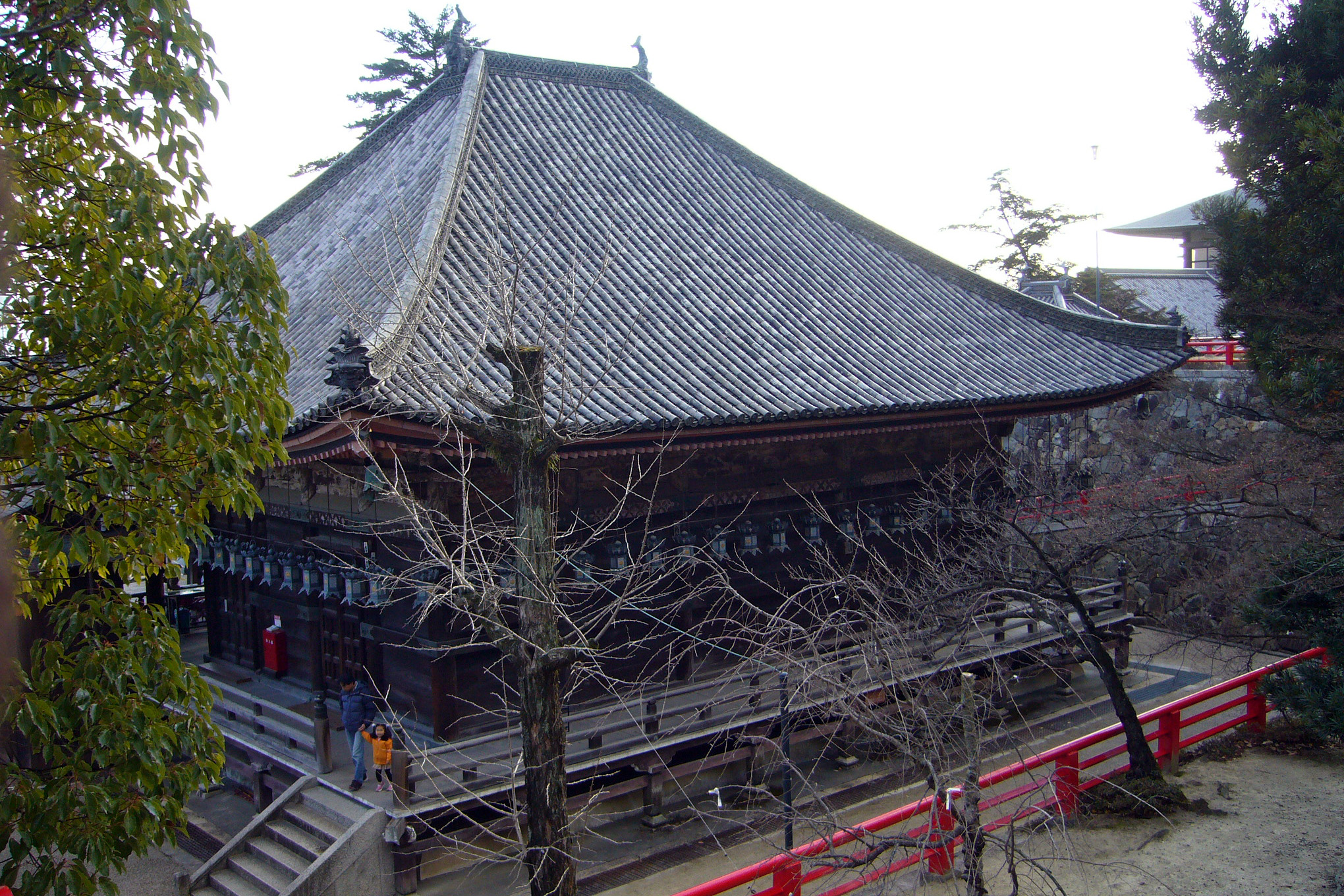
Hondō

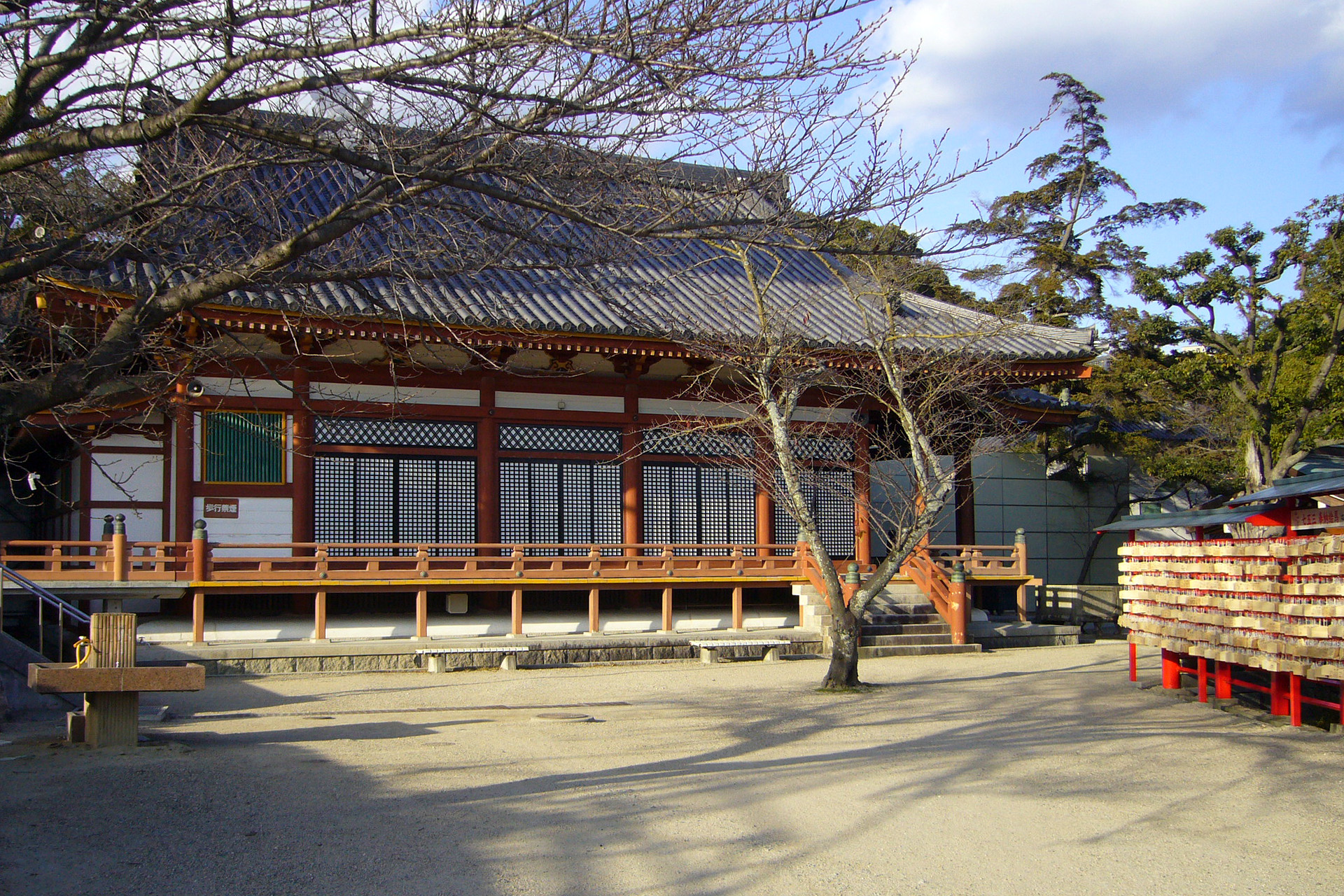
Amida-dō

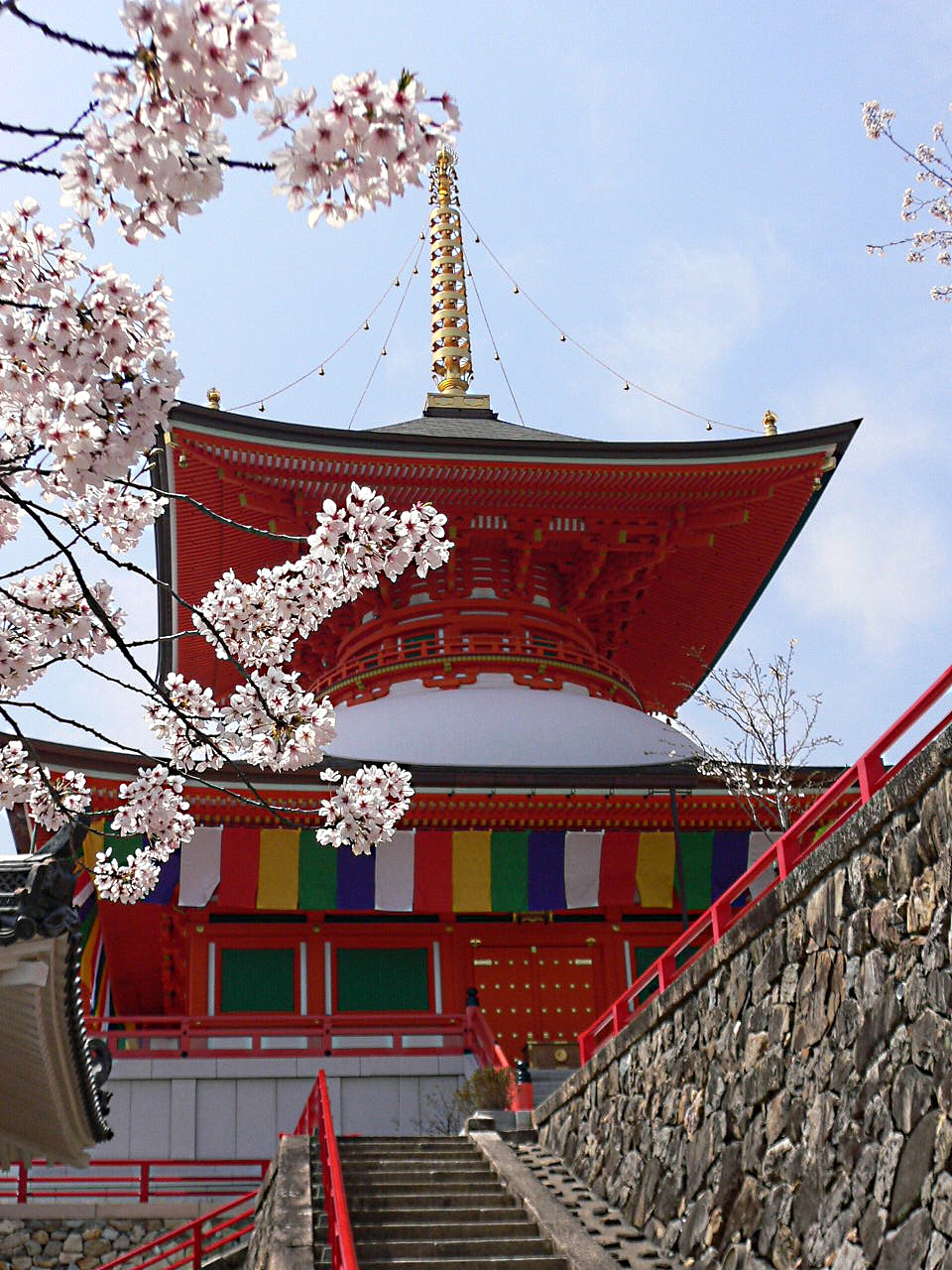
Tahōtō Pagoda

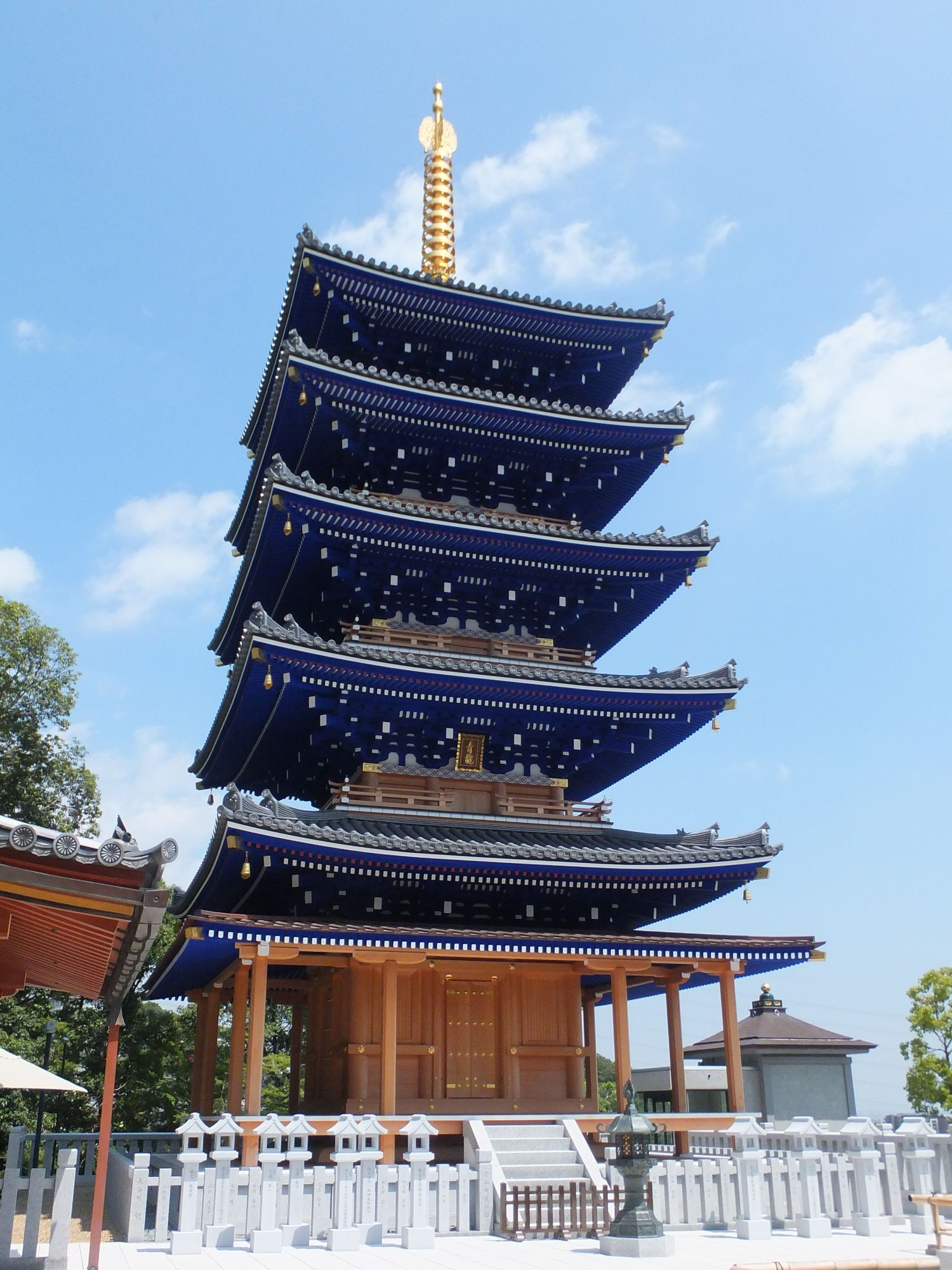
Five-story Pagoda

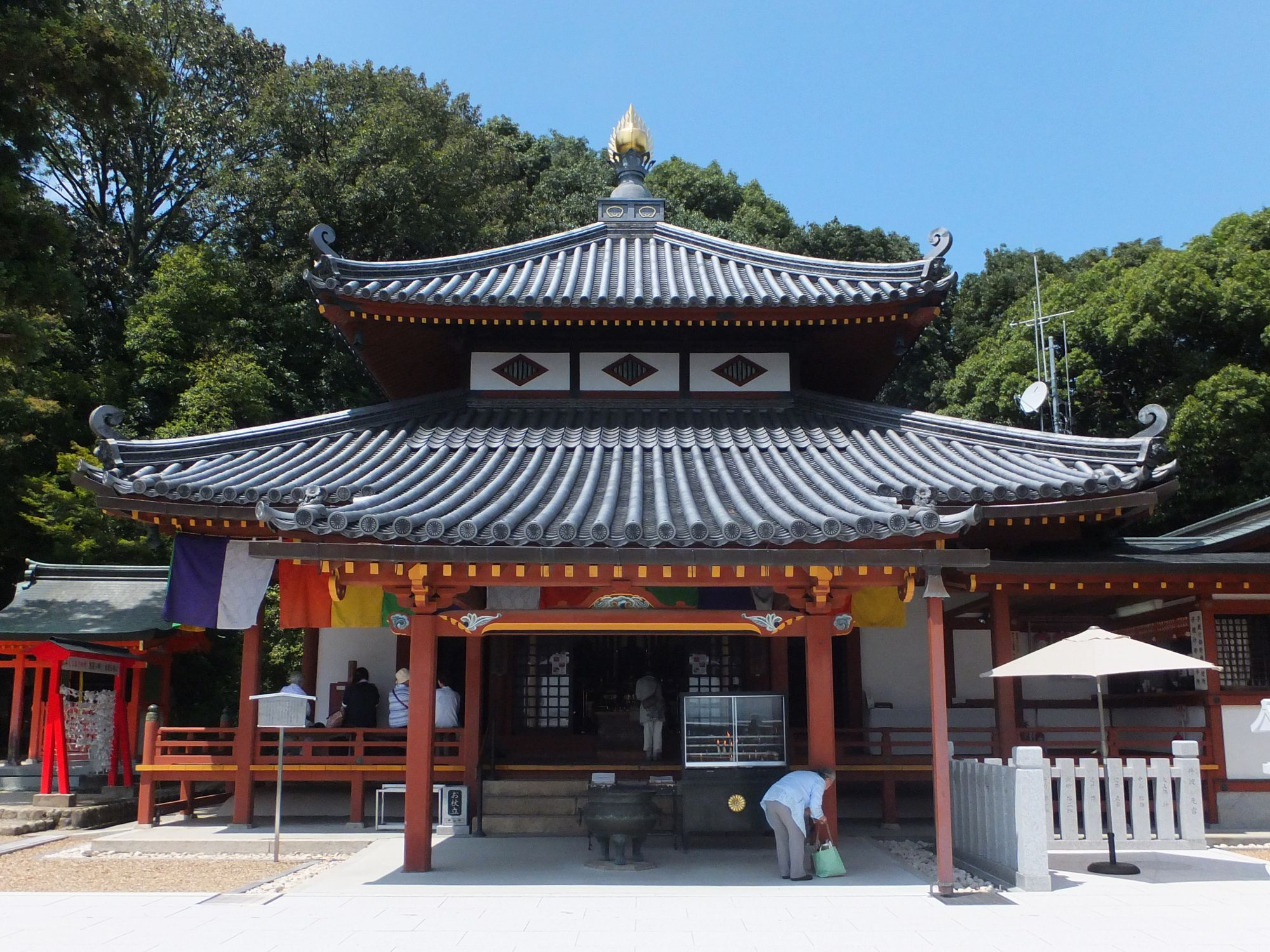
Daishi-dō

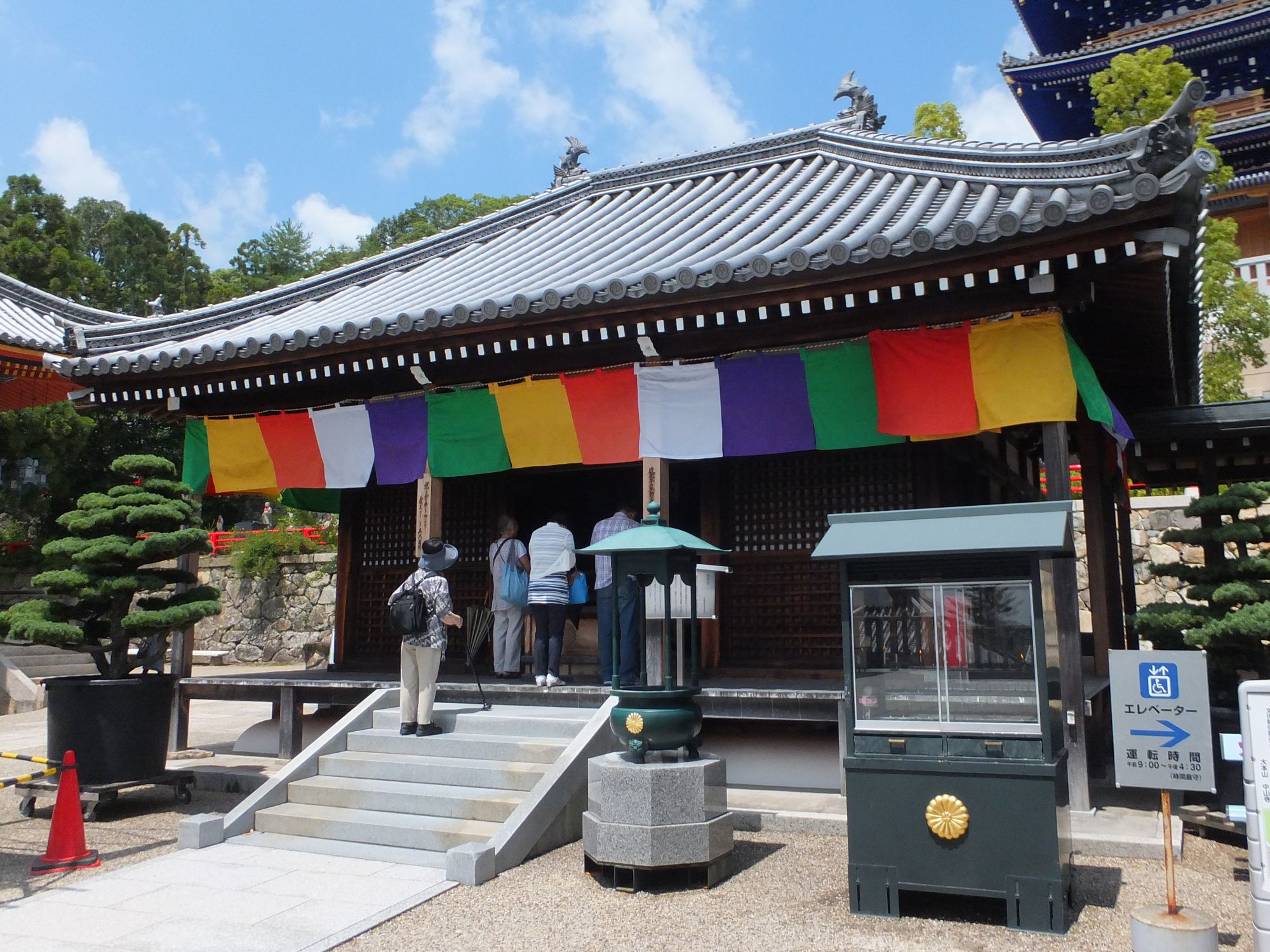
Goma-dō

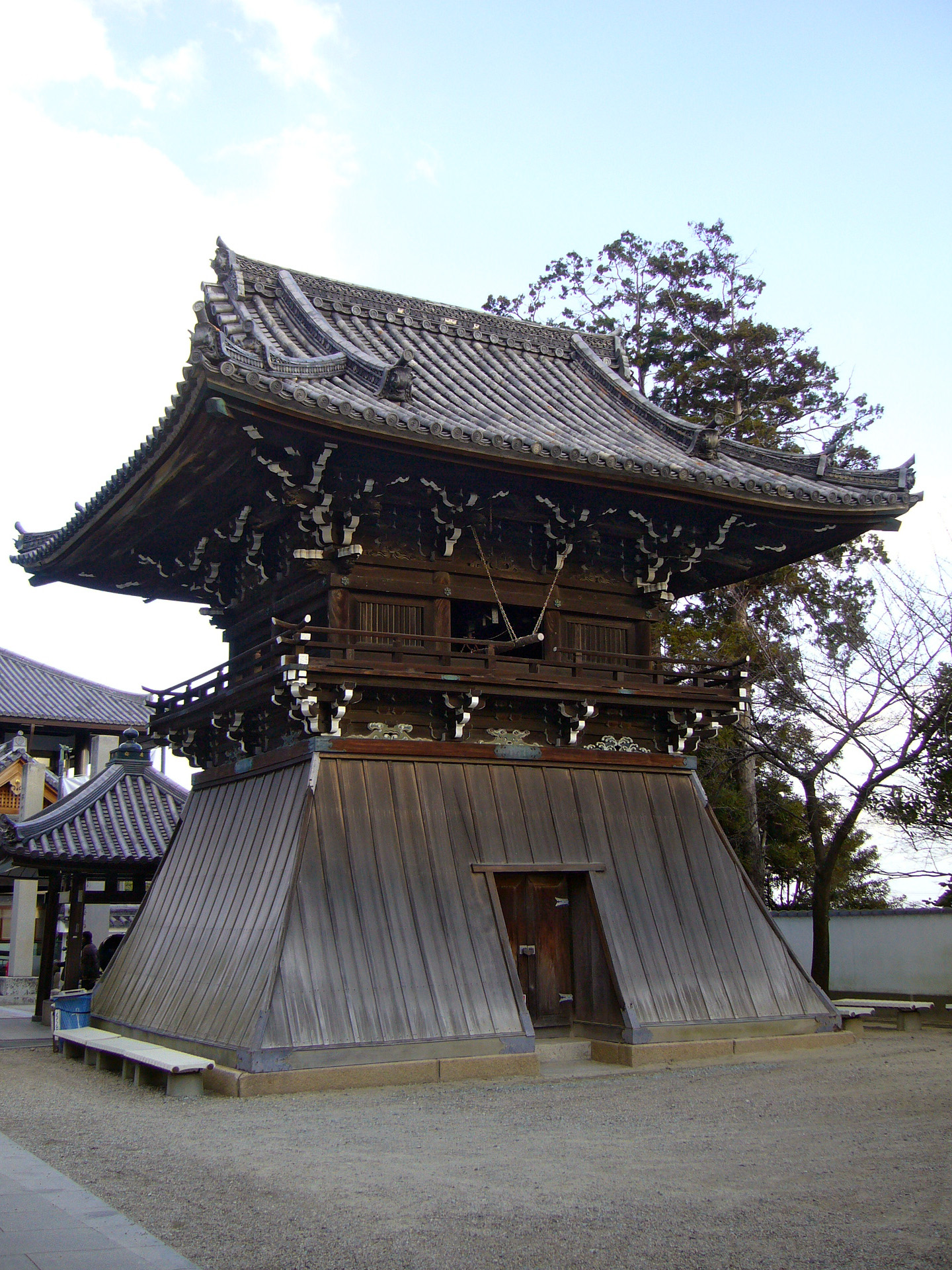
Shōrō

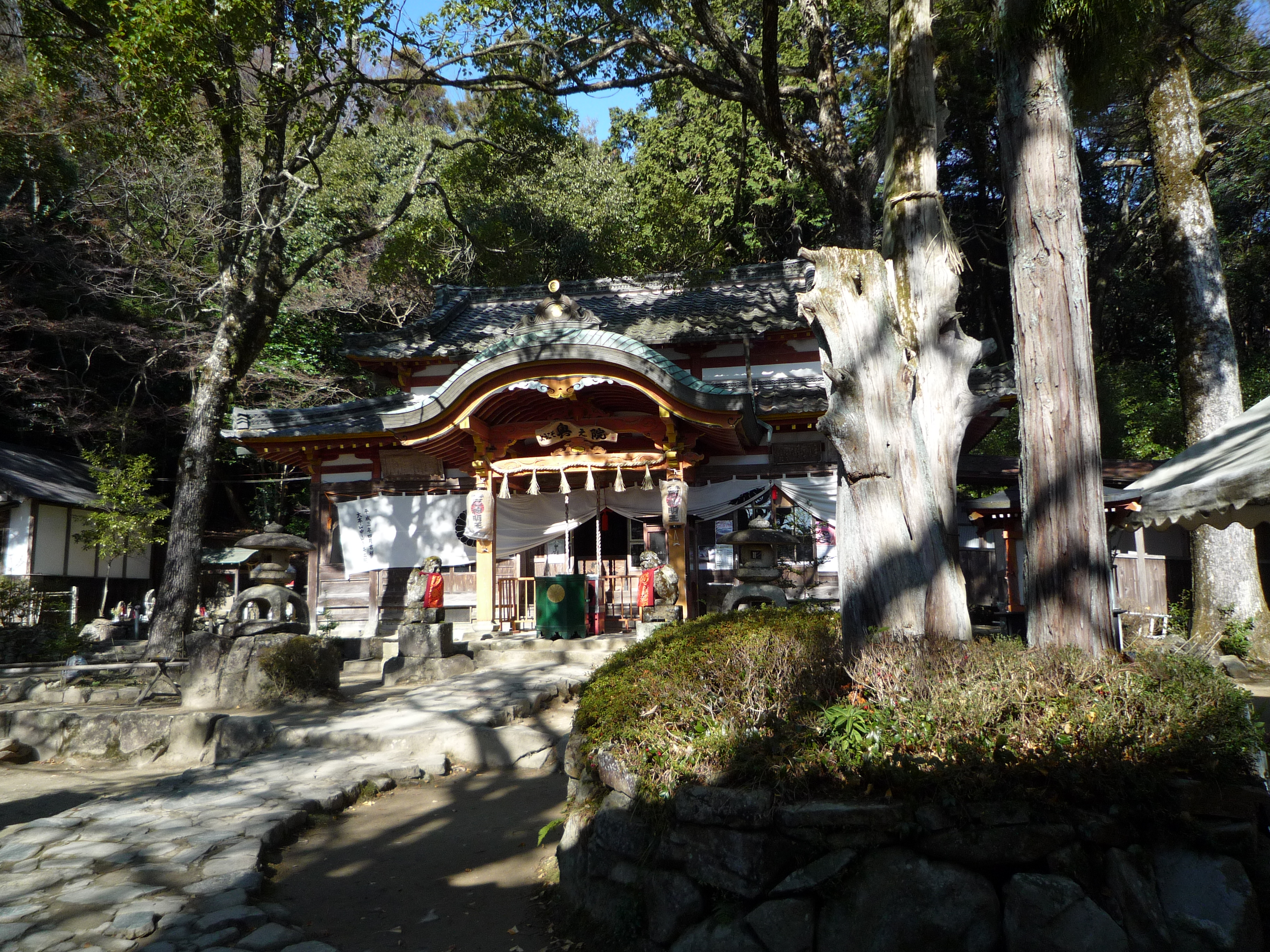
Oku-no-In

The temple is approximately a two-minute walk from Nakayama-kannon Station on the JR West Hankyu Railway Takarazuka Line or an 18-minute walk from Nakayamadera Station on the JR West Fukuchiyama Line.

== Cultural Properties ==
=== National Important Cultural Properties ===
- Wooden statue of standing Jūichimen Kannon (木造十一面観音立像), Heian period
- Wooden statue of seated Yakushi Nyorai (木造薬師如来坐像), Heian period period
- Wooden Statue of seated Shōtoku Taishi (木木造聖徳太子坐像), Muromachi period
- Wooden statue of seated Dainichi Nyorai (木造大日如来坐像), Heian period period

=== Hyogo Prefectural Designated Tangible Cultural Properties ===
- Hondō (本堂), Edo period;
- Goma-dō (護摩堂), Edo period;
- Daimon (大門), Edo period;
- Wooden Standing statue of Kannon Bosatsu (木造脇侍十一面観音立像), Kamakura period; Set of two

=== Hyogo Prefectural Designated Tangible Cultural Properties ===
- Shiratorizuka Kofun (白鳥塚古墳（中山寺古墳）), Kofun period;

=== Takarazuka City Designated Tangible Cultural Properties ===
- Wooden standing statue of Yakushi Nyorai (木造薬師如来坐像),
- Wooden standing statue of Aizen Myōō (木造愛染明王坐像),
- Iron handing lantern (鉄製吊燈籠),
- Bronze waniguchi (銅製鰐口),
- Calligraphy: Toyokuni Daimyōjin (「豊国大明神」神号 - 豊臣秀頼筆), Sengoku period; by Tokotomi Hideyori.
- Choishi (町石)

=== Takarazuka City Designated Intangible Cultural Properties ===
- Hoshiori Matsuri (星下り祭)

== See also ==
- Historical Sites of Prince Shōtoku
