= Mefu Shrine =

Shinto shrine in Japan

Mefu Jinja (売布神社)
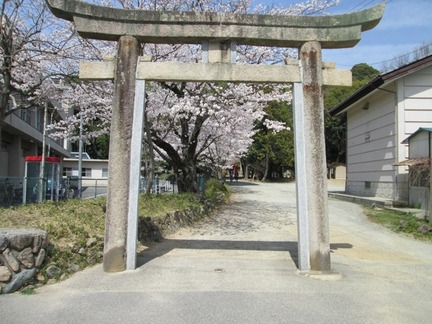

- Location within Japan

Religion
- Affiliation: Shinto

Location
- Coordinates: 34°49′02″N 135°21′30″E

Mefu Jinja (売布神社, Mefu-jinja) is a Shinto shrine in Takarazuka, Hyōgo, Japan established in 610, covering an area of 13,000m^{2}. The shrine is dedicated to the Shinto gods of food, clothing, wealth and marriage.

== History ==
It is one of the shrines mentioned in the Engishiki, which was written in 8th century, and the official history of the shrine says that it was founded in 610.

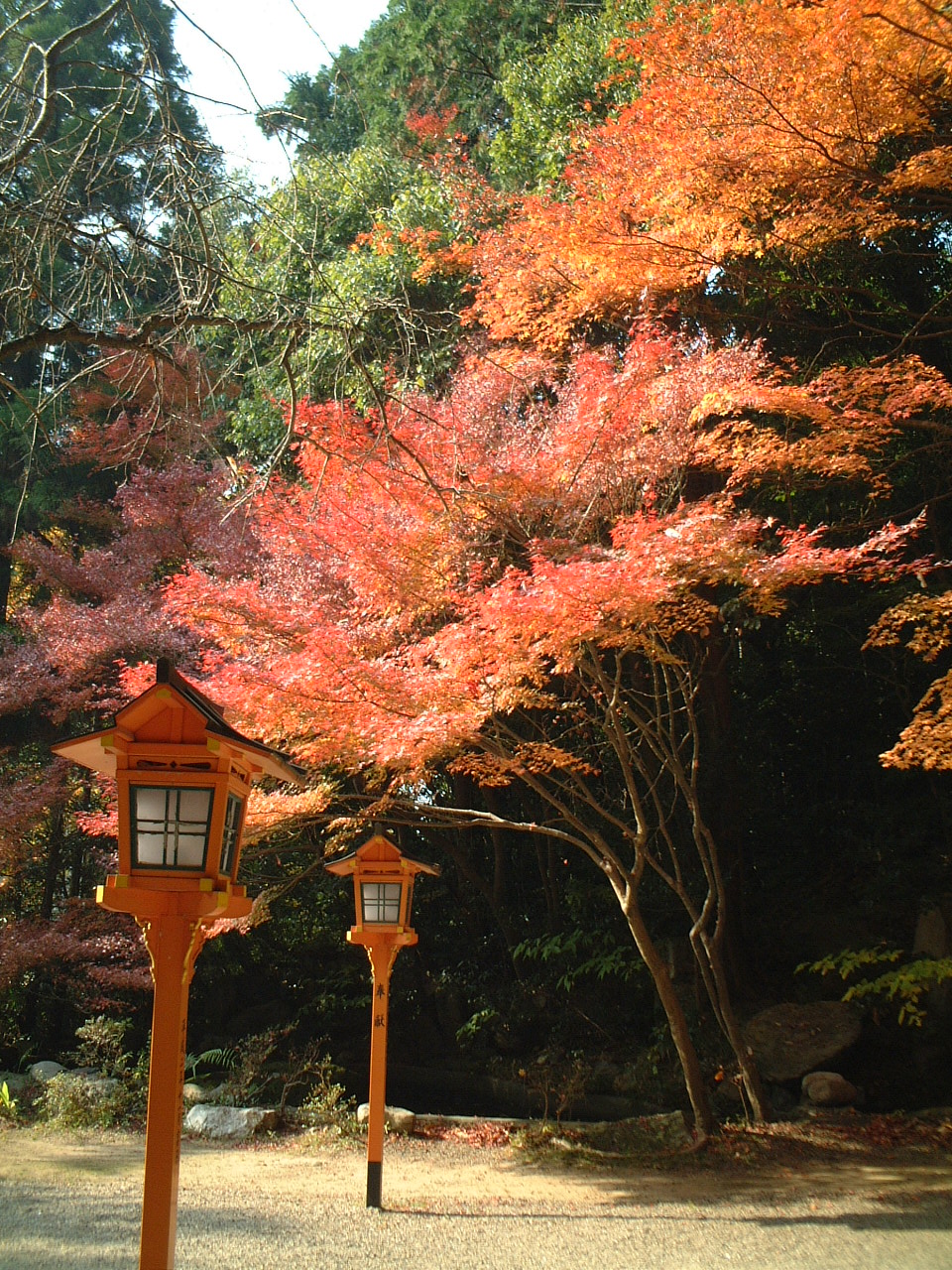
A View at Mefu Jinja

The area around this shrine was ruled by the Mononobe clan, and it was originally a shrine to worship their ancestors.

== Objects for Worship ==
The principal objects of worship (shintai) at the shrine are Shitateruhime and Ame no Wakahiko. The two gods are understood as a wife and husband.

== Access ==
The entrance station to this shrine is the Mefu-jinja Station on the Hankyu Takarazuka Line.
