= Mefu-Jinja Station =

Railway station in Takarazuka, Hyōgo Prefecture, Japan

Mefu-Jinja Station 売布神社駅
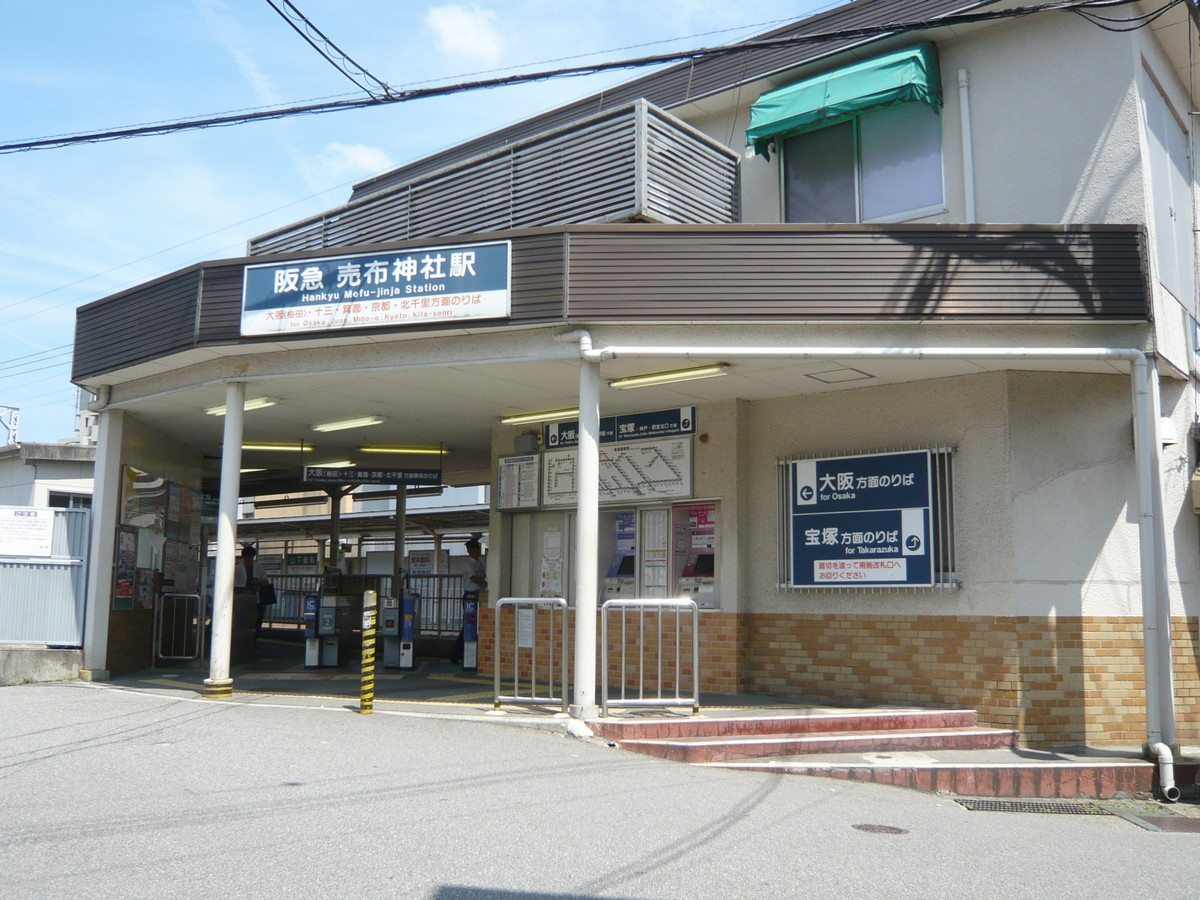
- Mefu-Jinja Station, August 2007

General information
- Location: 2-chōme-14 Mefu, Takarazuka-she, Hyōgo-ken 665-0852; Japan
- Coordinates: 34°48′56.98″N 135°21′40.67″E
- Operator: Hankyu Railway
- Line: ■ Takarazuka Main Line
- Distance: 22.4 km (13.9 miles) from Osaka-umeda
- Platforms: 2 side platforms

Other information
- Status: Staffed
- Station code: HK54
- Website: Official website

History
- Opened: 21 March 1914

Passengers
- FY2016: 9357 daily

Services
Preceding station	Hankyu Railway	Following station
Nakayama-kannon towards Osaka-umeda	Takarazuka Main Line Local Express	Kiyoshikōjin towards Takarazuka
Nakayama-kannon towards Osaka-umeda	Takarazuka Main Line Semi-Express	Kiyoshikōjin One-way operation
Location
- Location within Hyōgo Prefecture Location within Japan

Mefu-Jinja Station (売布神社駅, Mefu-Jinja-eki; station number: HK54) is a passenger railway station located in the city of Takarazuka Hyōgo Prefecture, Japan. It is operated by the private transportation company Hankyu Railway.

== Lines ==
Mefu-Jinja Station is served by the Hankyu Takarazuka Line, and is located 22.4 kilometers from the terminus of the line at Osaka-umeda.

== Station layout ==
The station has two ground level side platforms; however, there is no connection between platforms, and passengers wishes to switch platforms must leave the station and re-enter from the other side.

=== Platforms ===
1	■ Takarazuka Line	for Takarazuka, Nishinomiya-Kitaguchi, Imazu and Kōbe
2	■ Takarazuka Line	for Ōsaka (Umeda), Minoo, Kyōto and Kita-Senri

== History ==
Mefu-Jinja Station opened on March 21, 1914.

== Passenger statistics ==
In fiscal 2019, the station was used by an average of 9357 passengers daily

== Surrounding area ==
- Mefu Shrine
- Takarazuka Municipal Mefu Elementary School

== See also ==
- List of railway stations in Japan
