= Sakasegawa Station =

Railway station in Takarazuka, Hyōgo Prefecture, Japan

Sakasegawa Station 逆瀬川駅
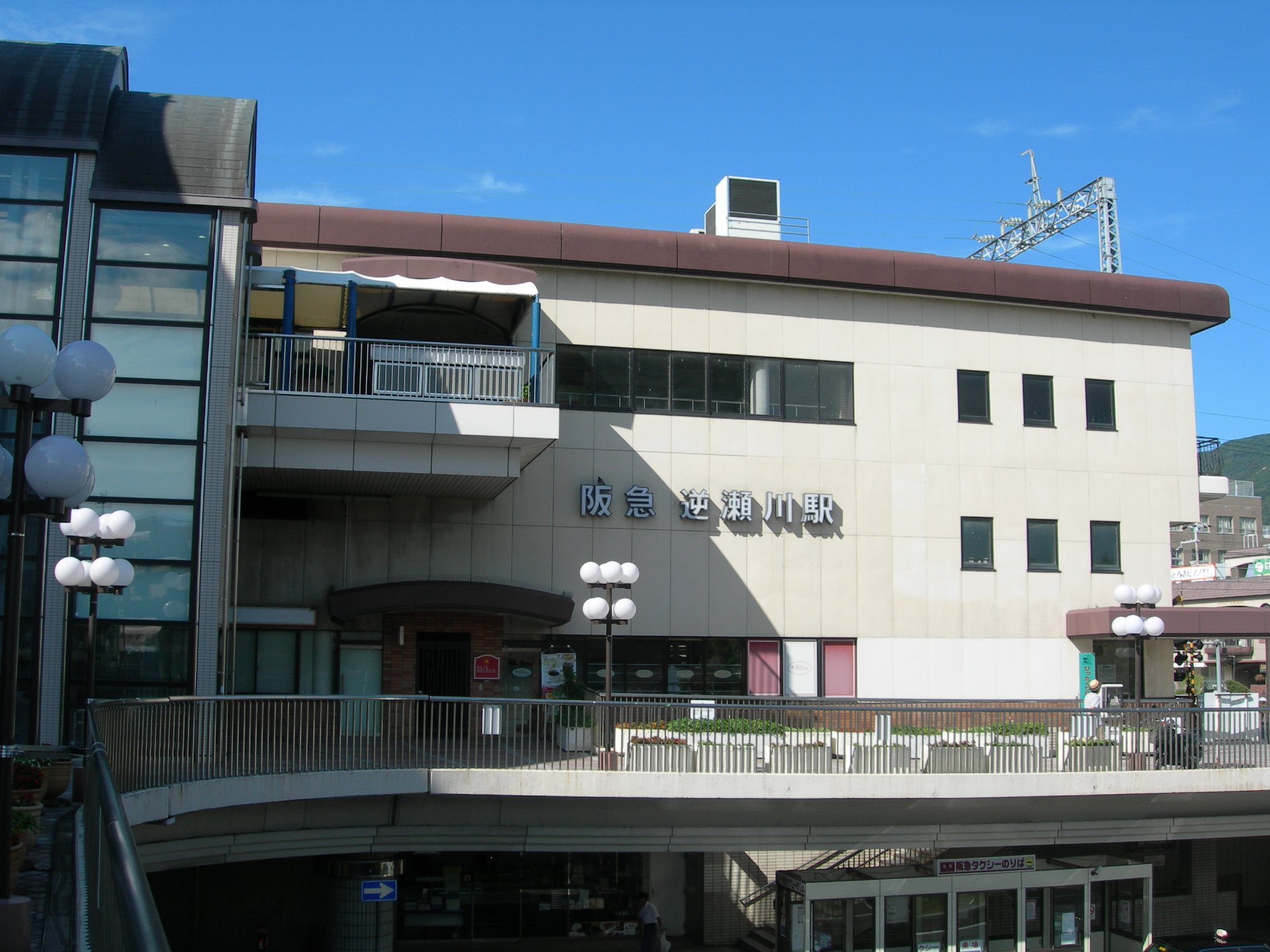
- Sakasegawa Station

General information
- Location: 2-chōme-2 Sakasegawa, Takarazuka-shi, Hyōgo-ken 665-0035; Japan
- Coordinates: 34°47′51.66″N 135°21′1.57″E
- Operator: Hankyu Railway.
- Line: ■ Hankyu Imazu Line
- Distance: 1.8 km (1.1 miles) from Takarazuka
- Platforms: 2 side platforms
- Tracks: 2

Other information
- Status: Staffed
- Station code: HK-27
- Website: Official website

History
- Opened: September 2, 1921

Passengers
- FY2019: 24,500 daily
Location
- Location within Hyōgo Prefecture Location within Japan

Sakasegawa Station (逆瀬川駅, Sakasegawa-eki; station number: HK-27) is a passenger railway station located in the city of Takarazuka Hyōgo Prefecture, Japan. It is operated by the private transportation company Hankyu Railway.

== Lines ==
Sakasegawa Station is served by the Hankyu Imazu Line, and is located 1.8 kilometers from the terminus of the line at Takarazuka and 21.5 kilometers from Osaka-umeda.

== Layout ==
The station consists of two opposed side platforms, connected by an elevated station building. On the station building are automatic ticket vending machines, ticket gates, shops, convenience stores, and restrooms. There are escalators that connect the platform to the concourse inside the ticket gate, and the concourse outside the ticket gate to the entrance. The effective length of the platform is 6 cars for Track 1 and 8 cars for Track 2

=== Platforms ===
1	■ Imazu Line	for Takarazuka
2	■ Imazu Line	for Nishinomiya-Kitaguchi

== Adjacent stations ==
«	Service	»
Takarazuka-Minamiguchi	Local	Obayashi
Takarazuka-Minamiguchi	Semi-Express (only running for Umeda)	Obayashi
Takarazuka-Minamiguchi	Arashiyama Limited Express (Extra)	Obayashi

== History ==
Sakasegawa Station opened on September 2, 1921.

== Passenger statistics ==
In fiscal 2019, the station was used by an average of 24,500 passengers daily

== Surrounding area ==
- Takarazuka City Hall
- Suehiro Central Park (disaster prevention park)
- Takarazuka City Working Citizen Center

== See also ==
- List of railway stations in Japan
