= Takarazuka, Hyōgo =

City in Kansai, Japan

Takarazuka 宝塚市
- Special city
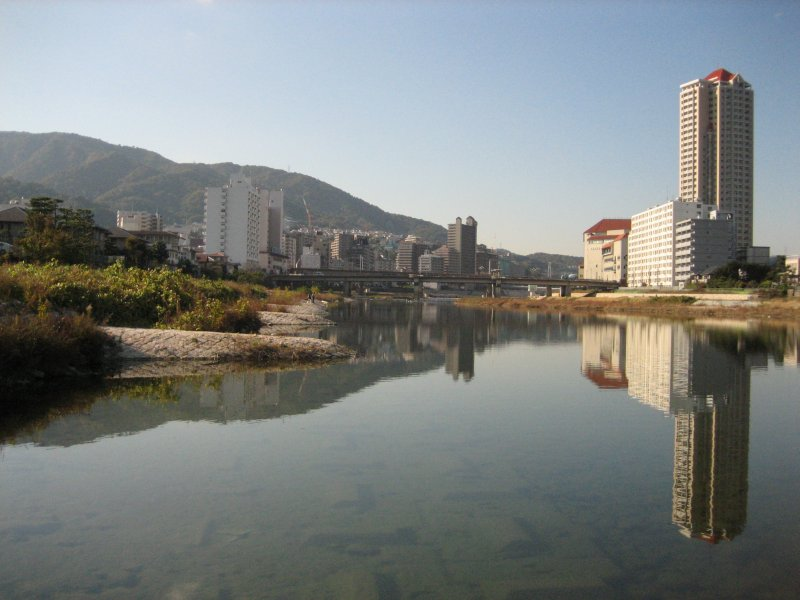
- Takarazuka seen from Muko River

- Flag Seal

- Location of Takarazuka in Hyōgo Prefecture

- Location in Japan
- Coordinates: 34°48′41″N 135°20′26″E
- Country: Japan
- Region: Kansai
- Prefecture: Hyōgo

Government
  - Mayor: Rintaro Mori

Area
  - Total: 101.80 km^{2} (39.31 sq mi)

Population (1 February 2024)
  - Total: 221,846
  - Density: 2,179.2/km^{2} (5,644.2/sq mi)
- Time zone: UTC+09:00 (JST)
- City hall address: 1-1 Tōyō-chō, Takarazuka-shi, Hyōgo-ken 665-8665
- Website: Official website
- Symbols
- Bird: Cettia diphone, Motacilla grandis
- Flower: Viola mandshurica (Japanese violet/sumire)
- Tree: Camellia sasanqua, Cornus kousa

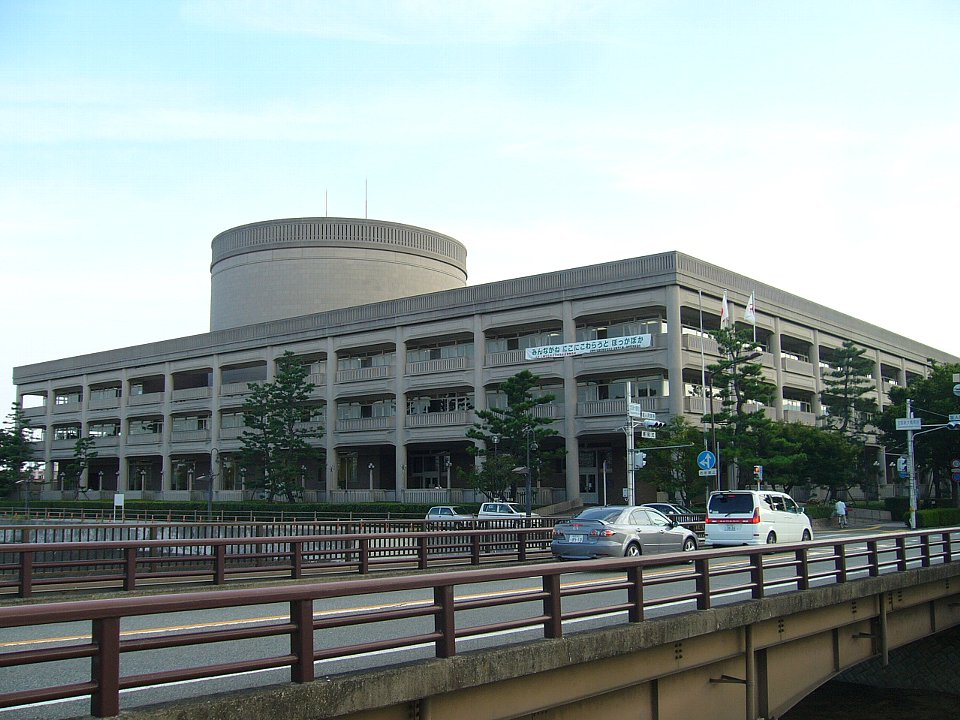
Takarazuka City Hall

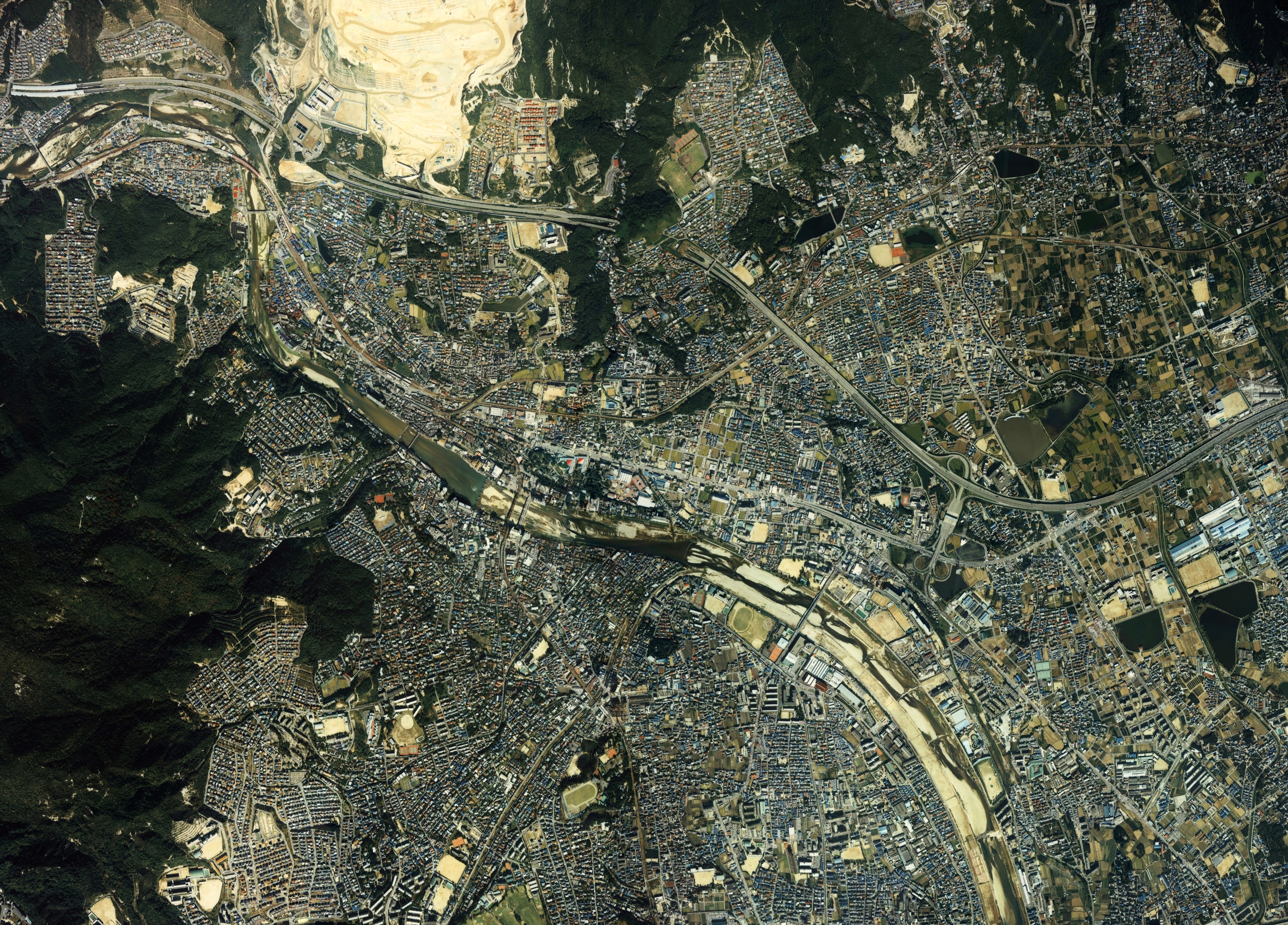
Aerial view of Takarazuka city center

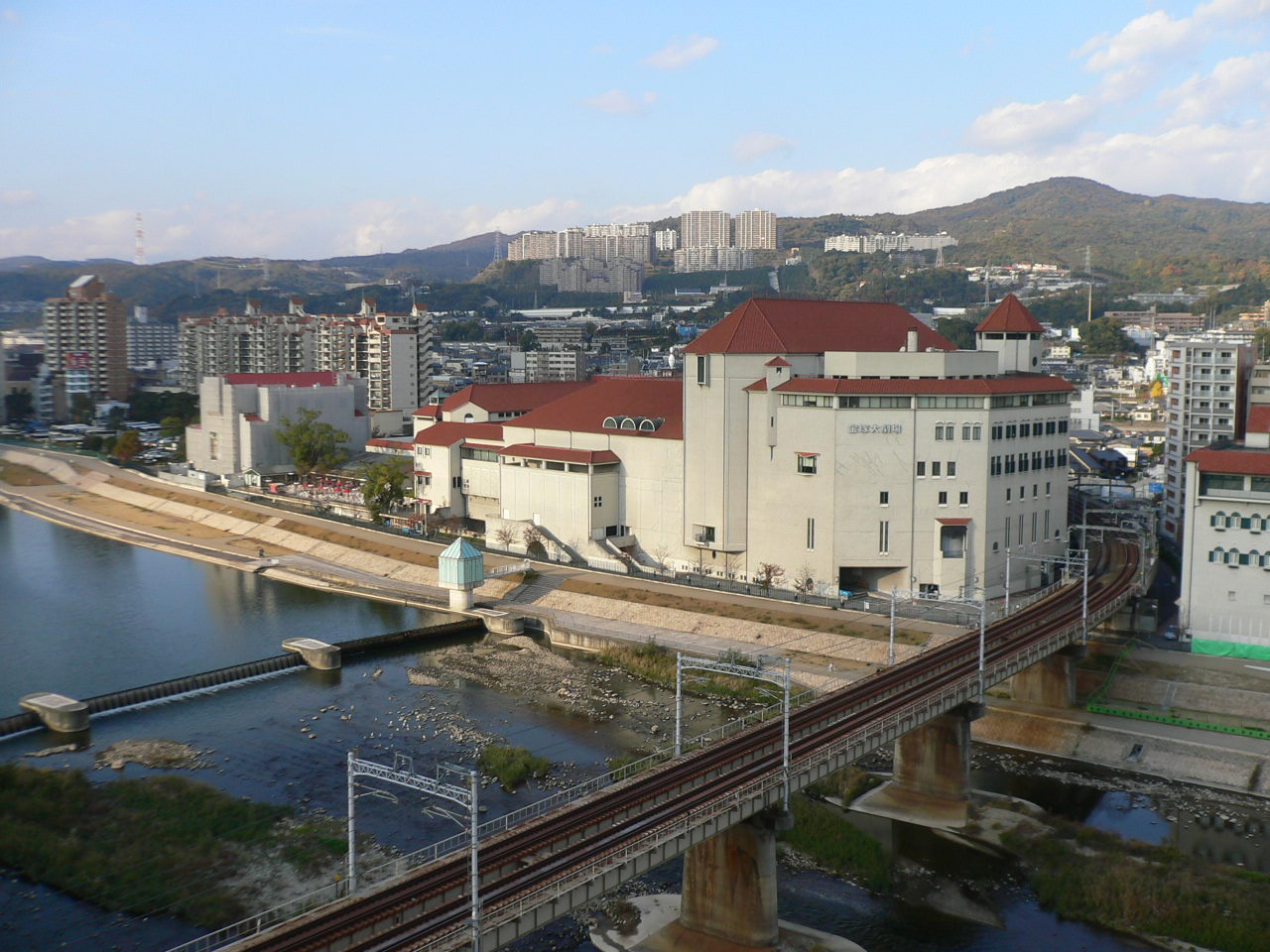
Takarazuka from the Muko River Takarazuka city center

Takarazuka (宝塚市, Takarazuka-shi) is a city located in Hyōgo Prefecture, Japan. As of 1 February 2024, the city had an estimated population of 221,846 in 96,729 households and a population density of 2,200 persons per km². The total area of the city is 101.80 square kilometres (39.31 sq mi). Known as the "inner parlor" of Kansai, Takarazuka is famous for the Takarazuka Revue, hot springs, and the Takarazuka Tourism Fireworks Display held since 1913. It is also famous as a choice residential area along with Ashiya and Nishinomiya.

== Geography ==
Takarazuka is located in the northern part of the Hanshin area, surrounded by the Rokko Range to the west and the Nagao mountain range to the north, with the Muko River flowing through the center.

=== Neighboring municipalities ===
Hyōgo Prefecture

- Inagawa
- Itami
- Kawanishi
- Kita-ku, Kobe
- Nishinomiya
- Sanda

=== Climate ===
Takarazuka has a humid subtropical climate (Köppen Cfa) characterized by warm summers and cool winters with light snowfall. The average annual temperature in Takarazuka is 14.0 °C. The average annual rainfall is 1578 mm with September as the wettest month. The temperatures are highest on average in July, at around 25.7 °C, and lowest in January, at around 2.6 °C.

== Demographics ==
Per Japanese census data, the population of Takarazuka has been increasing steadily since the 1950s.

Historical population
Year	Pop.	±%
1950	48,405	—
1960	66,491	+37.4%
1970	127,179	+91.3%
1980	183,628	+44.4%
1990	201,862	+9.9%
2000	213,037	+5.5%
2010	225,587	+5.9%

== History ==
The area of Takarazuka was part of ancient Settsu Province and has been inhabited since ancient times, with many kofun burial mounds found within the city limits. The Mefu Jinja dates from the Nara period. From the Heian period, numerous landed estates shōen controlled by the Fujiwara family were developed in the area. Takarazuka onsen is mentioned in Kamakura period records. In the Muromachi period, Kohama town developed as a temple town for Kōshō-ji, and subsequently Kohama Inn was established as a post station on Arima Road. The area was mostly tenryō territory under direct control of the Tokugawa shogunate in the Edo Period.

The village of Kohama (小浜村) was established on April 1, 1889 within Kawabe District, Hyōgo, with the creation of the modern municipalities system. In 1897, Hankaku Railroad (current Fukuchiyama Line) completed. In 1910, the Minoh Arima Electric Railway (current Hankyu Takarazuka Main Line completed). Takarazuka was a center of the culture from the 1910s to 1940s in what has been dubbed the age of Hanshinkan Modernism. This included the opening of the Takarazuka Girls' Opera (current Takarazuka Revue) on April 1, 1914.

Kohama was elevated to town status on March 15, 1951, changing its name to Takarazuka. On April 1 1954 it merged with the village of Yoshimoto (吉本村) in Muko District to become the city of Takarazuka. The city continued to expand by annexing Nagao Village on March 10, 1955, and Nishitani Village on March 14, 1955, but losing some areas in a border adjustment with the city of Itami on April 1, 1955. On January 17, 1995 the Great Hanshin earthquake caused more than 100 casualties. Takarazuka was designated as a Special City on April 1, 2003 with increased autonomy.

At one time, the idea was raised of merging Takarazuka with Itami, Kawanishi, and Inagawa, but it is currently on hold.

== Government ==
Takarazuka has a mayor-council form of government with a directly elected mayor and a unicameral city council of 26 members. Takarazuka contributes three members to the Hyōgo Prefectural Assembly. In terms of national politics, the city is divided between the Hyōgo 6th districts of the lower house of the Diet of Japan.

== Economy ==
Takarazuka has a mixed economy of commerce, manufacturing and market gardening. It is increasingly becoming a bedroom community for Osaka and Kobe, with quiet, upscale residential neighborhoods like Nigawa, Obayashi, Sakasegawa, and Hibarigaoka.

=== Companies headquartered in Takarazuka ===
- HI-LEX Corporation, a manufacturer of remote-controlling cables and accessories for multiple applications is headquartered in the city.
- ShinMaywa Industries, a manufacturer of military aircraft (especially seaplanes) and heavy duty trucks is headquartered in the city.

== Education ==
Universities and colleges

- Koshien University
- Takarazuka University
- Takarazuka Music School

Primary and secondary schools

Takazuka has 23 public elementary schools and 12 public middle schools operated by the city government, and five public high schools operated by the Hyōgo Prefectural Board of Education. There are three private elementary schools, two private middle schools and two private high schools. In addition, the prefecture also operates one special education school for the handicapped.

== Transportation ==
=== Railways ===
Kawanishi is serviced by the JR Takarazuka Line and the Hankyu Takarazuka Line. Hankyu's Kawanishi-Noseguchi Station is a transfer station to the Nose Railway, which runs primarily within Kawanishi.

JR West - Fukuchiyama Line

- Nakayamadera - Takarazuka - Takedao

Hankyu - Takarazuka Main Line

- Yamamoto - Nakayama-kannon - Mefu-Jinja - Kiyoshikōjin - Hankyu Takarazuka

Hankyu - Imazu Line

- Hankyu Takarazuka - Takarazuka-Minamiguchi - Sakasegawa - Obayashi - Nigawa

=== Highways ===
- Chūgoku Expressway
- Shin-Meishin Expressway
- National Route 176

=== Buses ===
- Hankyu Bus
- Hanshin Dentetsu Bus
- Hankyu Country Bus
- Shinki Bus

== Sister cities ==
Takarazuka is twinned with:

- Alsergrund, Austria
- Augusta, United States

== Local attractions ==
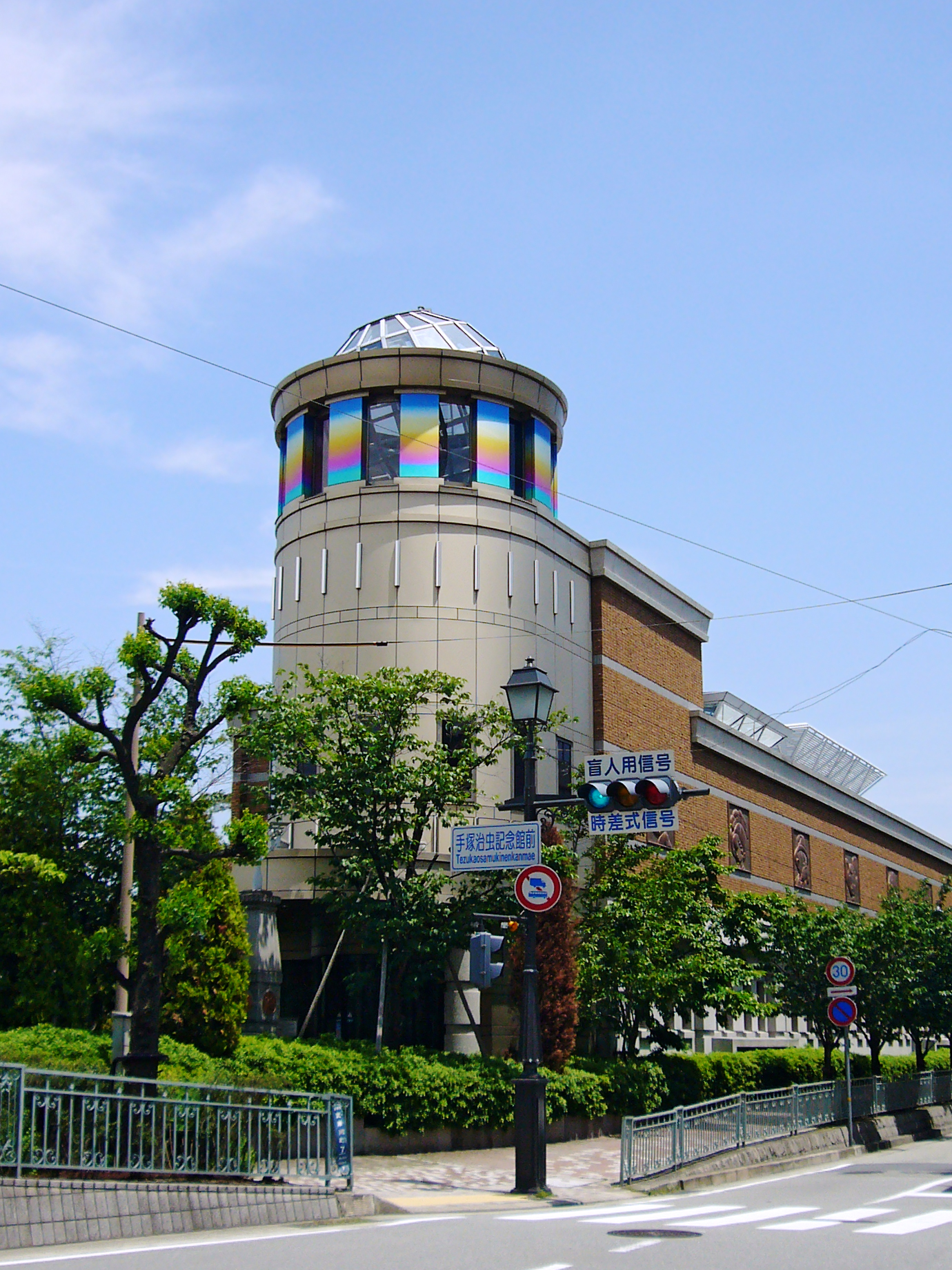
Osamu Tezuka Manga Museum

=== Specialty products ===
- Ornamental trees and flowers (dahlias, irises, etc.)
- Tansan senbei

=== Places ===
- Flower Road (花のみち, Hana-no Michi)
- Hanshin Racecourse (阪神競馬場, Hanshin-keibajō)
- Kohama Inn Resource Center (小浜宿資料館, Kohama-juku Shiryō-kan)
- Osamu Tezuka Manga Museum (手塚治虫記念館, Tezuka Osamu Kinen-kan)
- Shōji Residence (正司邸): Mixed Western- and Japanese-style mansion built in 1918–1919. Designed by Masaharu Furuzuka. National Registry of Tangible Cultural Properties. Filming location for NHK drama Twins (ふたりっ子, Futarikko).
- Takarazuka Bow Hall
- Takarazuka Grand Theatre (宝塚大劇場, Takarazuka Dai Gekijō)
- Takarazuka Hotel
- Takarazuka Hot Spring (宝塚温泉, Takarazuka Onsen)
- Takedao Hot Spring (武田尾温泉, Takedao Onsen)
- Tessai Art Museum (鉄斎美術館, Tessai Bijutsu-kan)

== Religious institutions ==
- Temples
  - Gosho-ji
  - Heirin-ji
  - Kiyoshikoujin Seichou-ji
  - Nakayamadera
- Shrines
  - Mefu Jinja

== Sightseeing and festivals ==
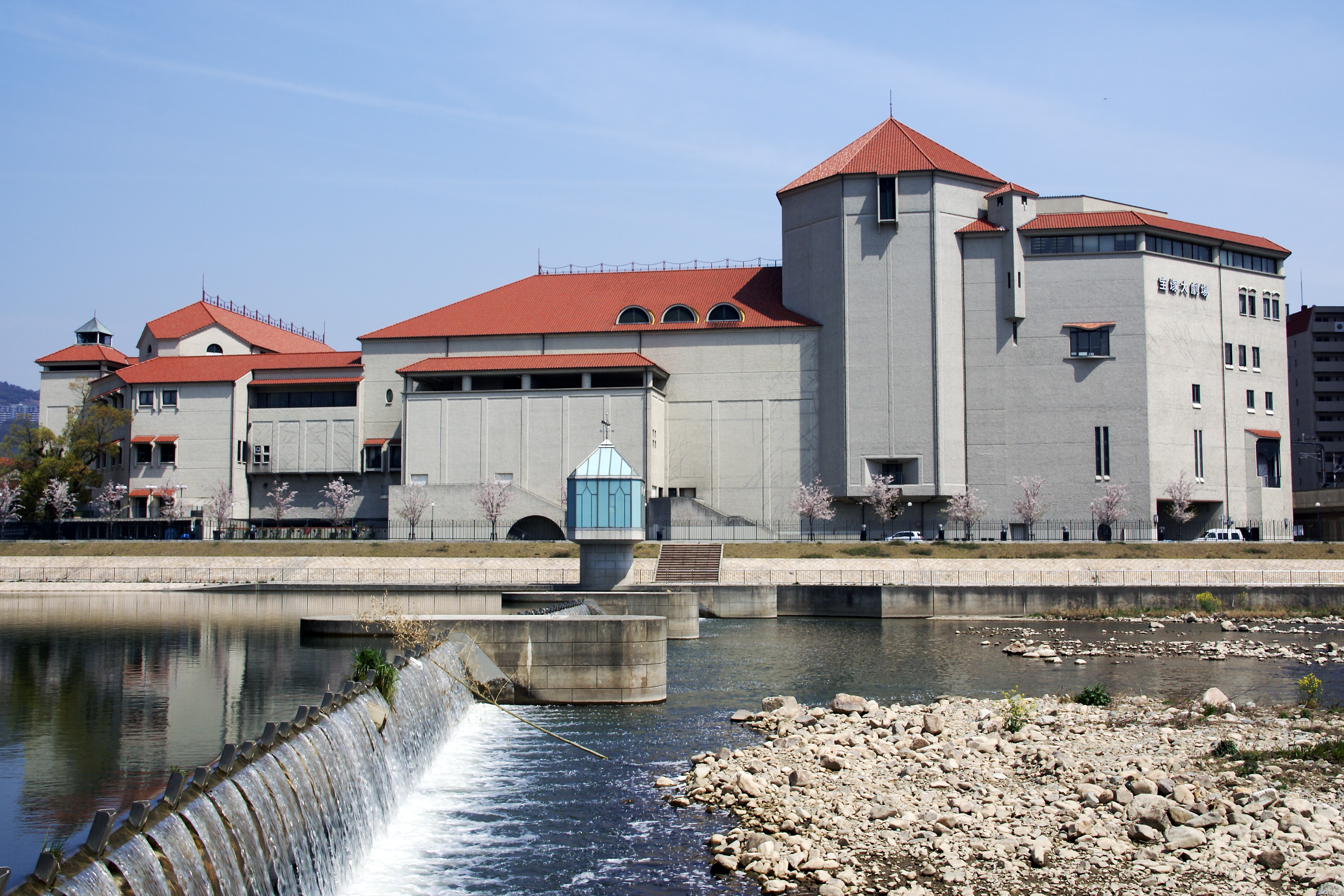
Takarazuka Grand Theater and Bow Hall

- Takarazuka Revue
- Flower Road
- Takarazuka Tourism Fireworks Display
- Takarazuka Kinen (horse race)

== Notable people from Takarazuka ==
- Saki Aibu, actress and celebrity
- Kyoko Hikami, voice actress
- Makoto Imaoka, professional baseball player
- Minami Itahashi, Olympic diver
- Shinji Okazaki, footballer
- Akira Raijin, professional wrestler
- Riku Miura, pair skater
- Kosaku Shimada, professional golfer
- Osamu Tezuka, cartoonist
- Seigo Yamamoto, drift driver
- Tarō Yamamoto, actor and politician
- Wakana Kimura, world-class violinist

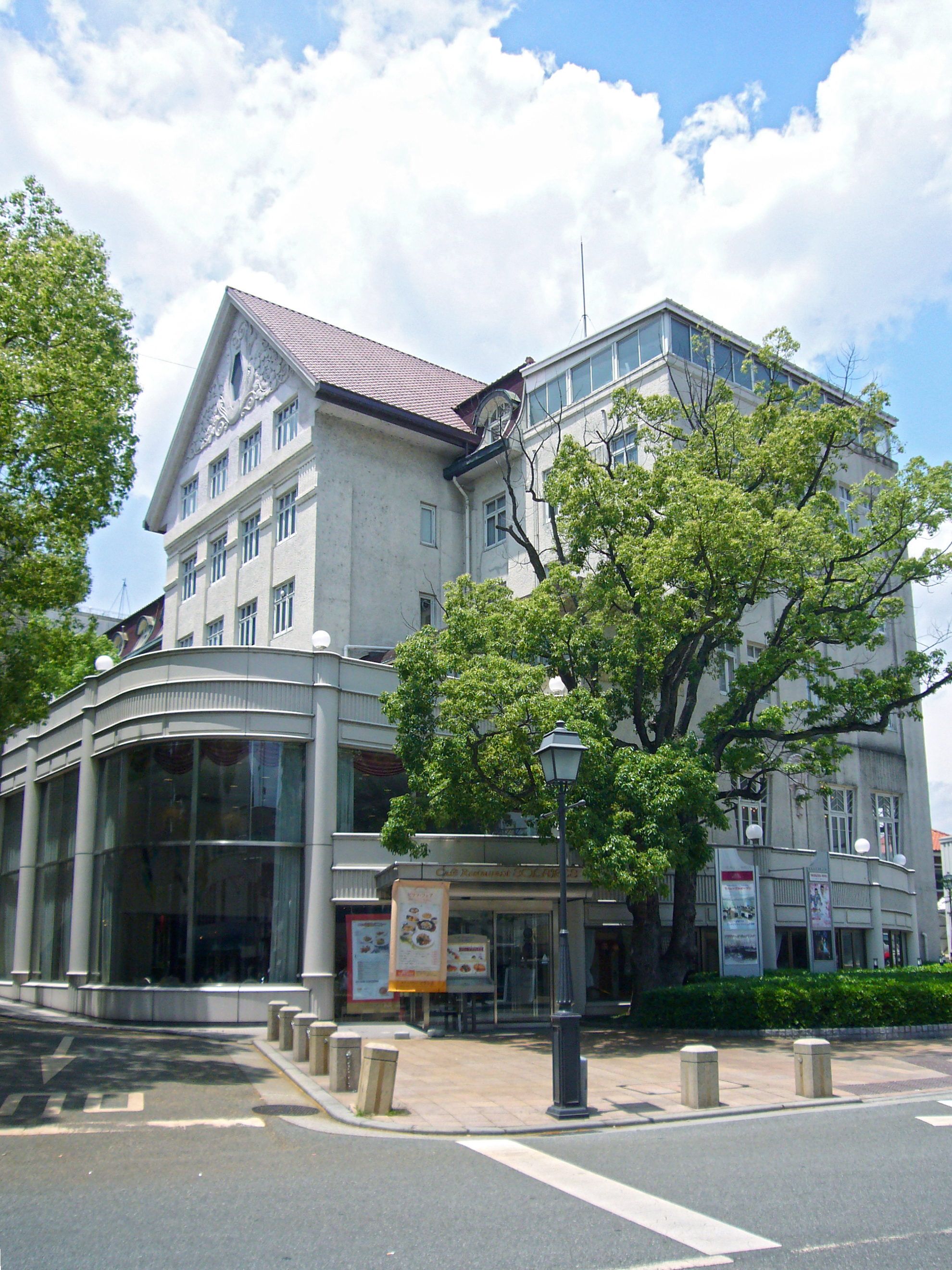
Takarazuka Hotel
