= Nakayamadera Station =

Railway station in Takarazuka, Hyōgo Prefecture, Japan

Nakayamadera Station 中山寺駅
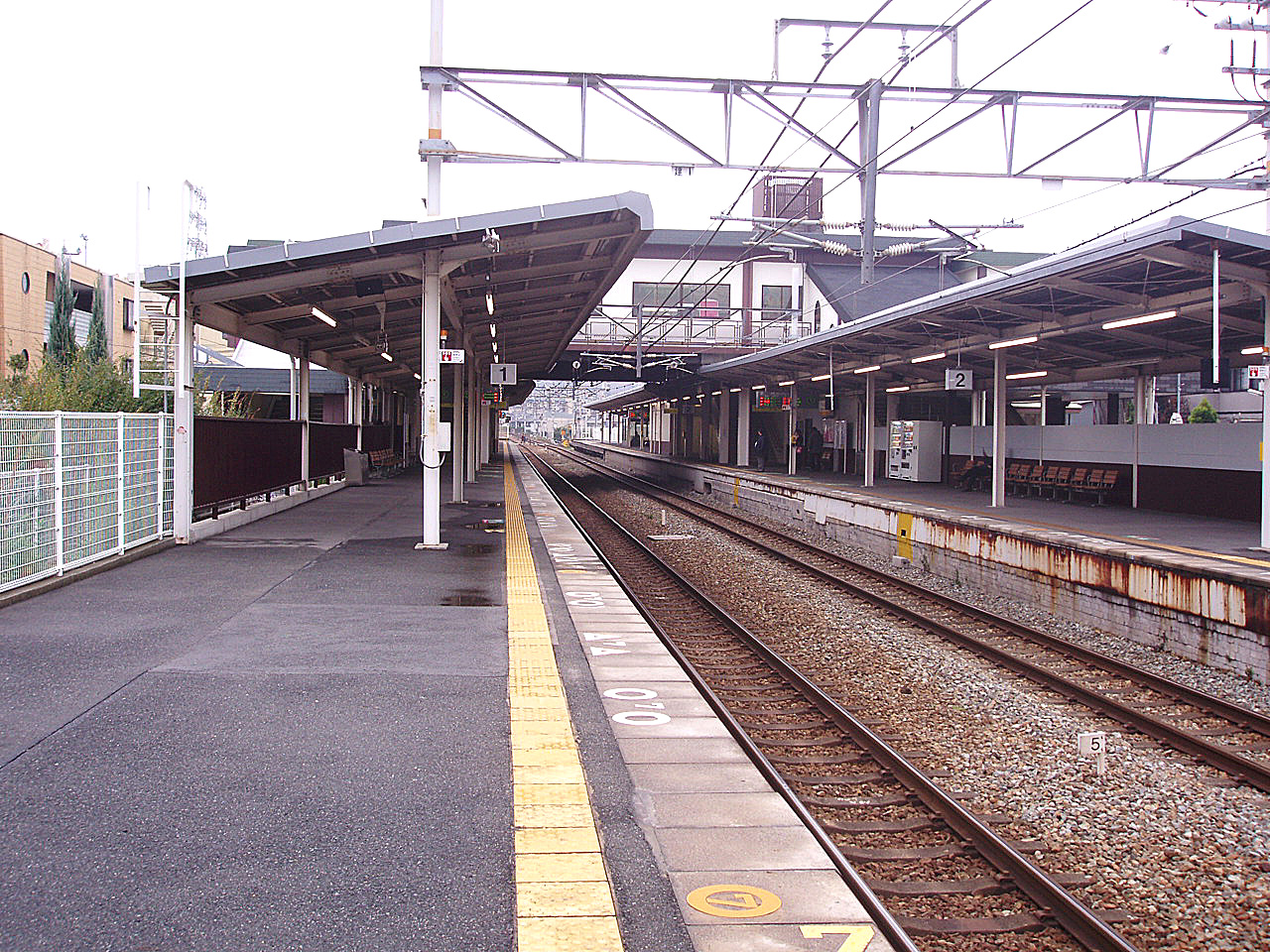
- Nakayamadera Station in December 2006

General information
- Location: 4 Chome-6-21 Nakasuji, Takarazuka-shi, Hyōgo-ken 665-0874; Japan
- Coordinates: 34°49′0.09″N 135°22′25.69″E
- Owner: West Japan Railway Company
- Operator: West Japan Railway Company
- Lines: Fukuchiyama Line (JR Takarazuka Line)
- Distance: 14.5 km (9.0 miles) from Amagasaki
- Platforms: 2 side platforms
- Connections: Bus stop

Construction
- Structure type: Ground level
- Accessible: Yes

Other information
- Status: Staffed (Midori no Madoguchi )
- Station code: JR-G55
- Website: Official website

History
- Opened: 27 December 1897
- Former names: Nakayama (to 1915)

Passengers
- FY2016: 1318 daily
Location
- Location within Hyōgo Prefecture Location within Japan

Nakayamadera Station (中山寺駅, Nakayamadera-eki) is a passenger railway station located in the city of Takarazuka, Hyōgo Prefecture, Japan. It is operated by the West Japan Railway Company (JR West).

== Lines ==
Nakayamadera Station is served by the Fukuchiyama Line (JR Takarazuka Line), and is located 14.5 kilometers from the terminus of the line at Amagasaki and 22.2 kilometers from Osaka.

== Station layout ==
The station consists of two ground-level opposed side platforms connected to the station building by a footbridge. The station has a Midori no Madoguchi staffed ticket office.

=== Platforms ===
| 1 | ■ Fukuchiyama Line (JR Takarazuka Line) | for Takarazuka and Sanda |
| 2 | ■ Fukuchiyama Line (JR Takarazuka Line) | for Amagasaki, Osaka and Kitashinchi |

== Adjacent stations ==
| « | Service | » |
JR West
Fukuchiyama Line (JR Takarazuka Line)
| Kawanishi-Ikeda | Local trains | Takarazuka |
| Kawanishi-Ikeda | Regional Rapid Service | Takarazuka |
| Kawanishi-Ikeda | Rapid Service | Takarazuka |
| Kawanishi-Ikeda | Tambaji Rapid Service | Takarazuka |

== History ==
Nakayamadera Station opened on 27 December 1897, as Nakayama Station (中山駅) a station of Hankaku Railway, which was nationalized in 1907. It was renamed to its present name on 11 September 1915. With the privatization of the Japan National Railways (JNR) on 1 April 1987, the station came under the aegis of the West Japan Railway Company.

Station numbering was introduced in March 2018 with Nakayamadera being assigned station number JR-G55.

== Passenger statistics ==
In fiscal 2016, the station was used by an average of 1318 passengers daily

== Surrounding area ==
- Nakayama-dera Temple
- Japan National Route 176

== See also ==
- List of railway stations in Japan
