= 1100 series =

1100 series may refer to:

== Japanese train types ==
- Hankyu 1100 series EMU operated by Hankyu Corporation between 1956 and 1989
- Izuhakone 1100 series EMU operated by the Izuhakone Railway

== Computing ==
- UNIVAC 1100 series, the earlier transistorized computer line
