= Sone Station (Osaka) =

Railway station in Toyonaka, Osaka Prefecture, Japan

Sone Station 曽根駅
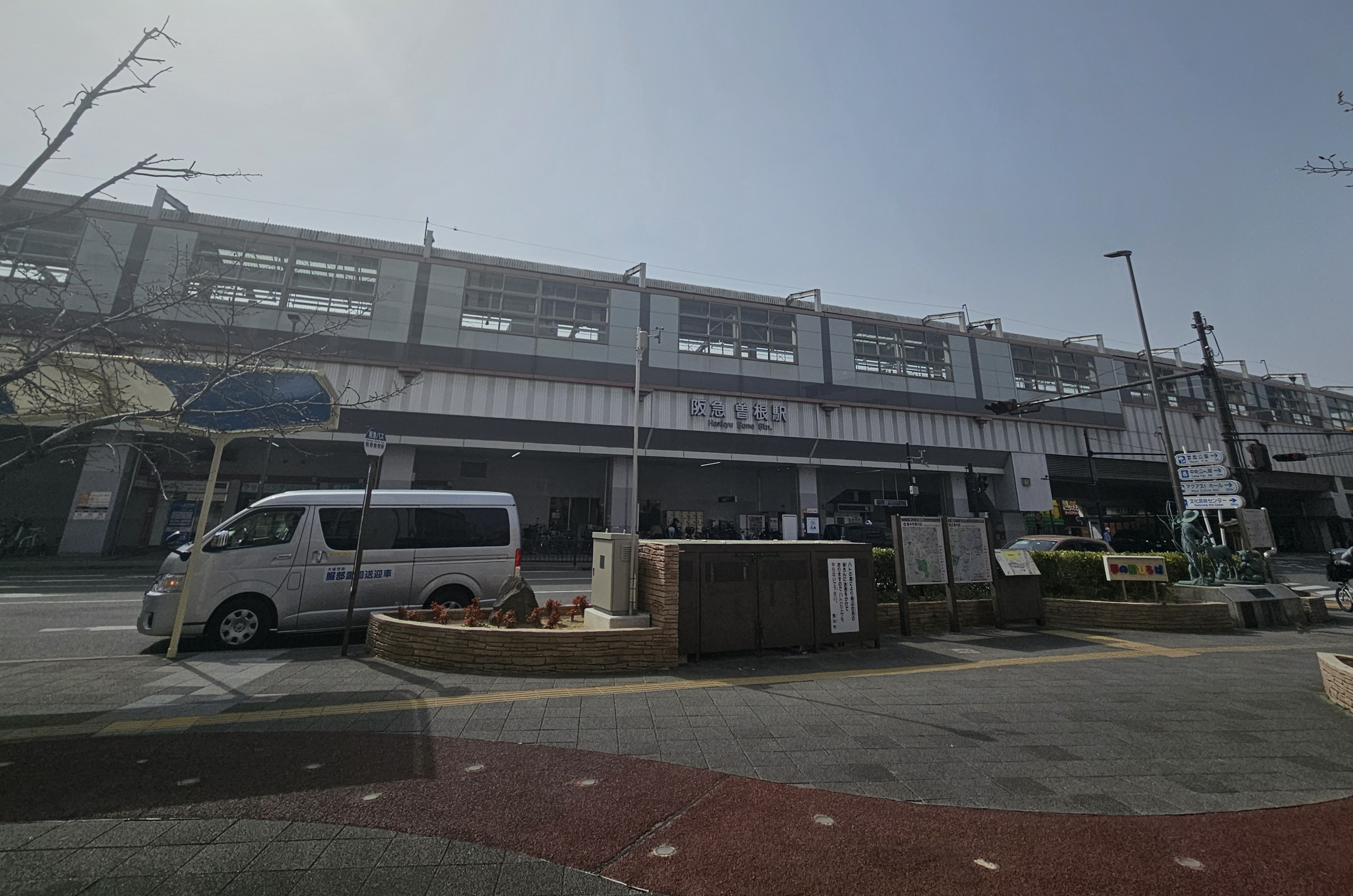
- Sone Station east exit, 2025

General information
- Location: 3-chōme-1 Sonehigashinochō, Toyonaka-shi, Osaka-fu 561-0802
- Coordinates: 34°46′18.39″N 135°28′03.15″E
- Operator: Hankyu Railway
- Line: ■ Takarazuka Main Line
- Distance: 8.7 km (5.4 miles) from Osaka-umeda
- Platforms: 2 island platforms
- Tracks: 5

Construction
- Accessible: yes

Other information
- Status: Staffed
- Station code: HK-44
- Website: Official website

History
- Opened: May 30, 1912

Passengers
- FY2019: 24,131 daily

Services
Preceding station	Hankyu Railway	Following station
Hattori-tenjin HK-43 towards Osaka-umeda	Takarazuka Main Line Local	Okamachi HK-45 towards Takarazuka
Jūsō HK-03 towards Osaka-umeda	Takarazuka Main Line Semi-Express	Okamachi HK-45 One-way operation
Location
- Location within Osaka Prefecture Location within Japan

Sone Station (曽根駅, Sone-eki; station number: HK-44) is a passenger railway station located in the city of Toyonaka, Osaka Prefecture, Japan. It is operated by the private transportation company Hankyu Railway.

== Lines ==
Sone Station is served by the Hankyu Takarazuka Line, and is located 8.7 kilometers from the terminus of the line at Osaka-umeda.

== Layout ==
The station consists of two elevated island platforms with the station facilities underneath. The platform itself is curved and has a slight incline. The effective length of the platform corresponds to 10-car trains. The ticket gates and concourse are on the 2nd floor, and the platform is on the 3rd floor of the station building. A storage track is located between through tracks in the north of the platforms connecting Tracks 2, 3 and 4.

=== Platforms ===
1	■ Takarazuka Line	for Takarazuka, Kawanishi-noseguchi, Ishibashi handai-mae and Minoo
2	■ Takarazuka Line	for Osaka-umeda

== History ==
Sone Station opened on 30 May 1912. Since the 1970s there have been plans to build a line to Itami Airport from Sone, which would allow through service between the airport and Umeda. Although Hankyu shelved the plans in the 1980s due to capacity constraints, the plans were reportedly revived in 2017 and remain under consideration as of 2018. The Itami Airport terminal is approx. 4 km from Sone.

Station numbering was introduced to all Hankyu stations on 21 December 2013 with this station being designated as station number HK-44.

== Passenger statistics ==
In fiscal 2019, the station was used by an average of 24,131 passengers daily

== Surrounding area ==
- Toyonaka City Cultural Arts Center - Former Toyonaka Civic Hall

== See also ==
- List of railway stations in Japan
