= Toyonaka Station =

Railway station in Toyonaka, Osaka Prefecture, Japan

Toyonaka Station 豊中駅
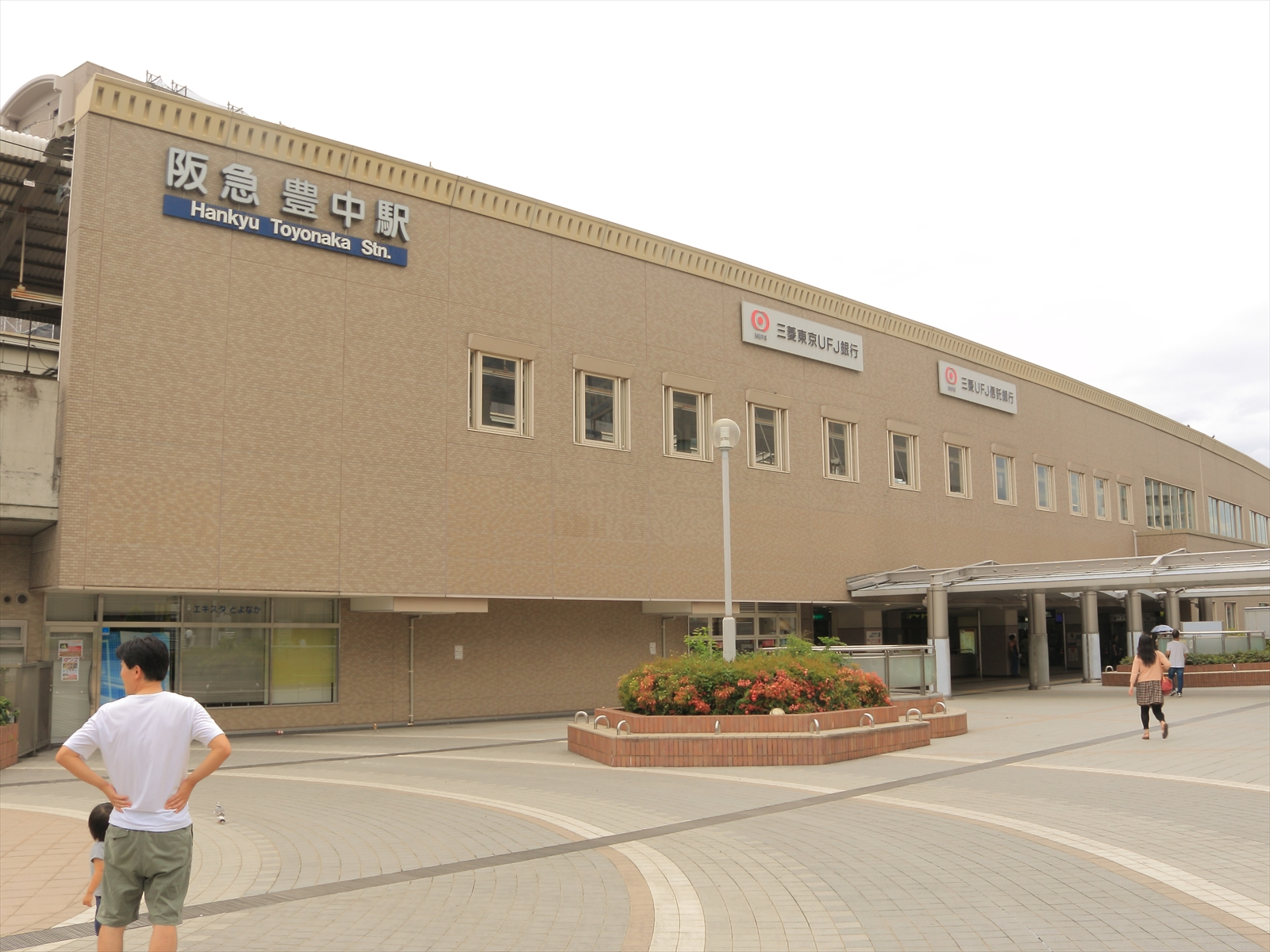
- Toyonaka Station east exit, 2015

General information
- Location: 1-chōme-1 Honmachi, Toyonaka-shi, Osaka-fu 560-0021
- Coordinates: 34°47′15.23″N 135°27′40.83″E
- Operator: Hankyu Railway.
- Line: ■ Hankyu Takarazuka Line
- Distance: 10.5 km (6.5 miles) from Osaka-umeda
- Platforms: 1 island platforms
- Tracks: 2

Construction
- Accessible: yes

Other information
- Status: Staffed
- Station code: HK-46
- Website: Official website

History
- Opened: September 29, 1913

Passengers
- FY2019: 47,483 daily

Services
Preceding station	Hankyu Railway	Following station
Okamachi HK-45 towards Osaka-umeda	Takarazuka Main Line Local	Hotarugaike HK-47 towards Takarazuka
Okamachi HK-45 towards Osaka-umeda	Takarazuka Main Line Semi-Express	Hotarugaike HK-47 One-way operation
Jūsō HK-03 towards Osaka-umeda	Takarazuka Main Line Express	Hotarugaike HK-47 towards Takarazuka
Jūsō HK-03 towards Osaka-umeda	Takarazuka Main Line Commuter Limited Express	Ishibashi handai-mae HK-48 One-way operation
Location
- Location within Osaka Prefecture Location within Japan

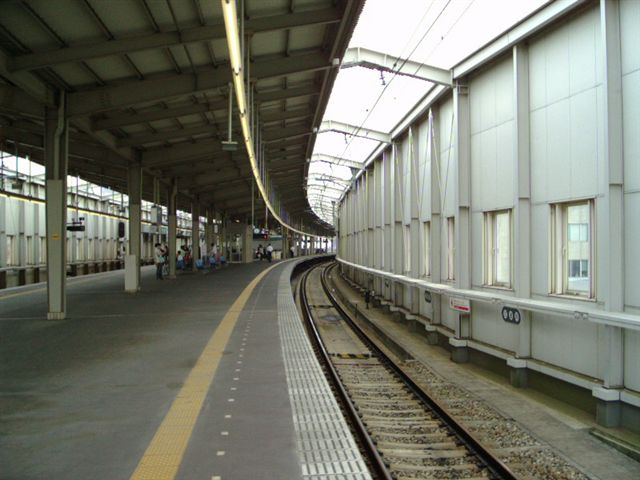
Platform of Toyonaka Station

Toyonaka Station (豊中駅, Toyonaka-eki; station number: HK-46) is a passenger railway station located in the city of Toyonaka, Osaka Prefecture, Japan. It is operated by the private transportation company Hankyu Railway.

== Lines ==
Toyonaka Station is served by the Hankyu Takarazuka Line, and is located 10.5 kilometers from the terminus of the line at Osaka-umeda.

== Layout ==
The station consists of one elevated island platform with the station facilities underneath. The platform itself is curved and has a slight incline. The effective length of the platform corresponds to 10-car trains. The ticket gates and concourse are on the 2nd floor, and the platform is on the 3rd floor of the station building.

=== Platforms ===
1	■ Takarazuka Line	for Takarazuka, Kawanishi-noseguchi, Ishibashi handai-mae and Minoo
2	■ Takarazuka Line	for Osaka-umeda

== History ==
Toyonaka Station opened on 29 September 1913.

Station numbering was introduced to all Hankyu stations on 21 December 2013 with this station being designated as station number HK-46.

== Passenger statistics ==
In fiscal 2019, the station was used by an average of 47,483 passengers daily

== Surrounding area ==
- Toyonaka Municipal Oike Elementary School
- Toyonaka Inari Shrine
- Inariyama Park

== See also ==
- List of railway stations in Japan
