= Shōnai Station (Osaka) =

Railway station in Toyonaka, Osaka Prefecture, Japan

Shōnai Station 庄内駅
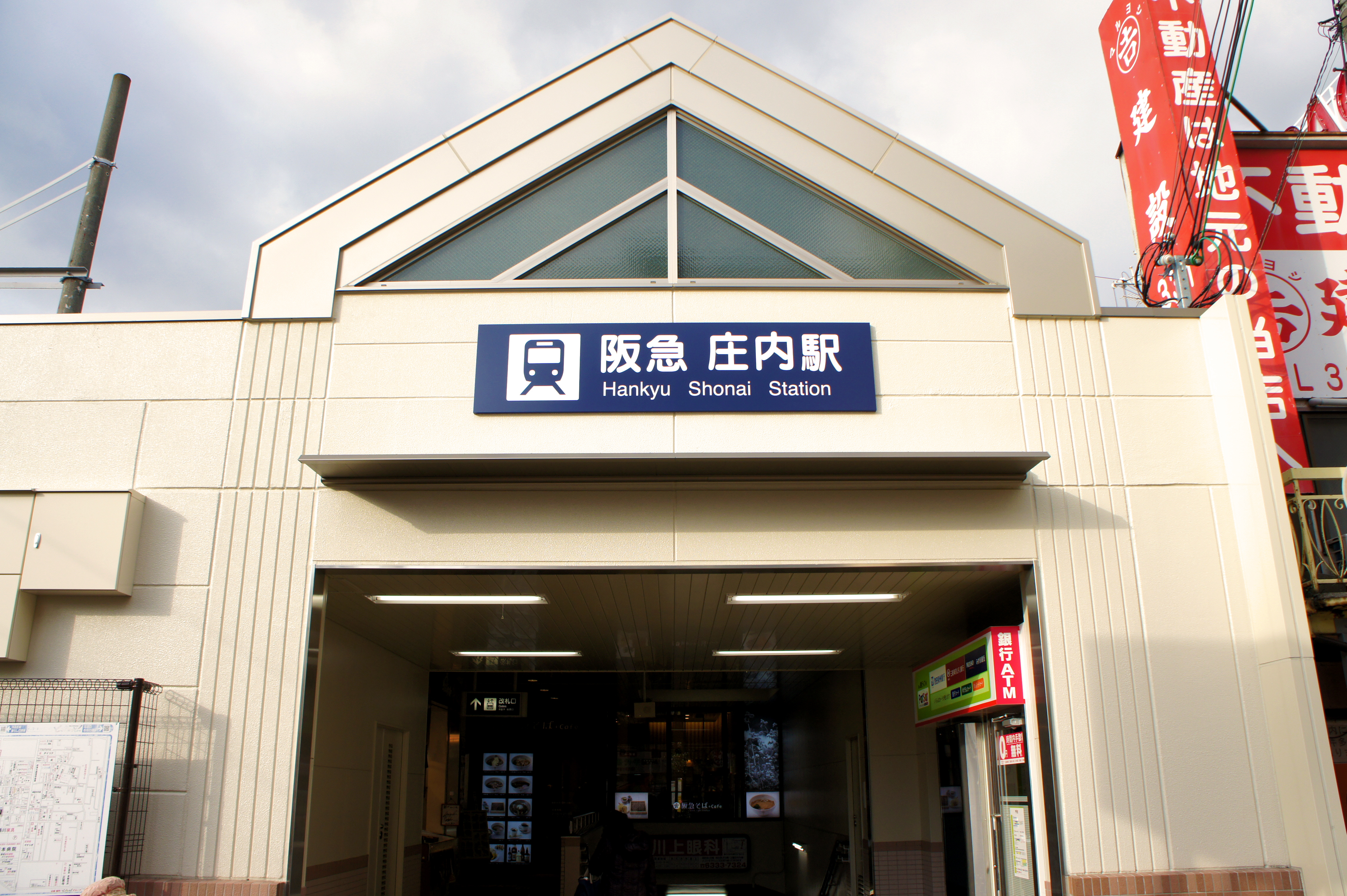
- Shōnai Station east exit, 2012

General information
- Location: 1-chōme-10 Shōnai Higashimachi, Toyonaka-shi, Osaka-fu 561-0831
- Coordinates: 34°45′0.68″N 135°28′29.64″E
- Operator: Hankyu Railway
- Line: Takarazuka Main Line
- Distance: 6.0 km (3.7 miles) from Osaka-umeda
- Platforms: 2 island platforms
- Tracks: 4

Construction
- Accessible: yes

Other information
- Status: Staffed
- Station code: HK-42
- Website: Official website

History
- Opened: May 15, 1951

Passengers
- FY2019: 28,243 daily

Services
Preceding station	Hankyu Railway	Following station
Mikuni HK-41 towards Osaka-umeda	Takarazuka Main Line Local	Hattori-tenjin HK-43 towards Takarazuka
Location
- Location within Osaka Prefecture Location within Japan

Shōnai Station (庄内駅, Shōnai-eki; station number: HK-42) is a passenger railway station located in the city of Toyonaka, Osaka Prefecture, Japan. It is operated by the private transportation company Hankyu Railway.

== Lines ==
Shōnai Station is served by the Hankyu Takarazuka Line, and is located 6.0 kilometers from the terminus of the line at Osaka-umeda.

== Layout ==
The station consists of two island platforms connected by an underground passage.

=== Platforms ===
1, 2	■ Takarazuka Line	for Takarazuka, Kawanishi-noseguchi, Ishibashi handai-mae and Minoo
3, 4	■ Takarazuka Line	for Osaka-umeda

== History ==
Shōnai Station opened on 15 May 1951.

Station numbering was introduced to all Hankyu stations on 21 December 2013 with this station being designated as station number HK-42.

== Passenger statistics ==
In fiscal 2019, the station was used by an average of 28,243 passengers daily

== Surrounding area ==
- Japan National Route 176
- Tokuyukai General Sakamoto Hospital
- Osaka College of Music

== See also ==
- List of railway stations in Japan
