= 1300 series =

1300 series may refer to:

== Japanese train types ==
- Hankyu 1300 series (1957) EMU operated by Hankyu Corporation between 1957 and 1987
- Hankyu 1300 series EMU operated by Hankyu Corporation since 2014
