= Takarazuka Line =

Takarazuka Line (宝塚線, Takarazuka-sen) can refer to:

- JR Takarazuka Line, an alias of a part of the Fukuchiyama Line (between Osaka Station and Sasayamaguchi Station)
- Hankyū Takarazuka Main Line
