= Okamachi Station =

Railway station in Toyonaka, Osaka Prefecture, Japan

Okamachi Station 岡町駅
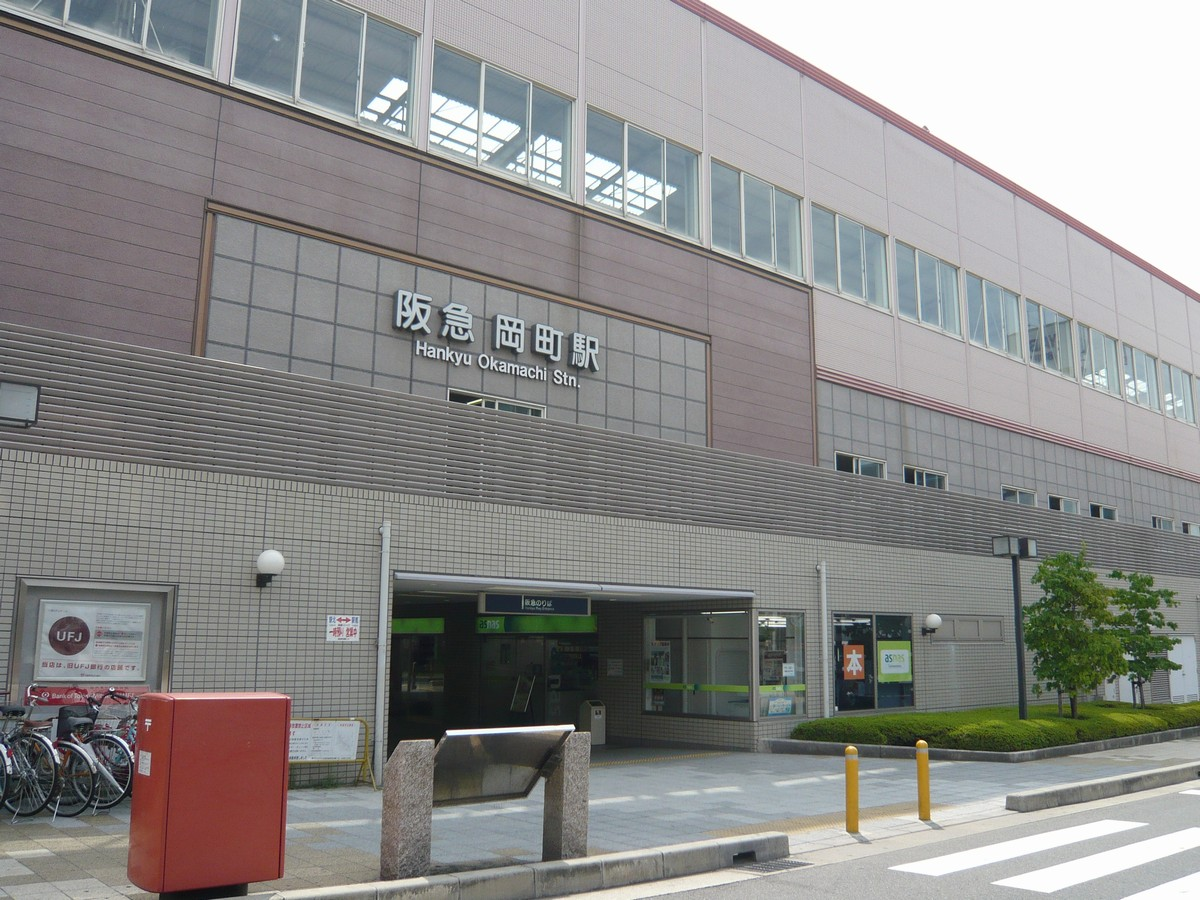
- Okamachi Station west exit, 2007

General information
- Location: 1-chōme-1 Nakasakurazuka, Toyonaka-shi, Osaka-fu 561-0881
- Coordinates: 34°46′44.62″N 135°27′54.17″E
- Operator: Hankyu Railway
- Line: ■ Takarazuka Main Line
- Distance: 90.5 km (56.2 miles) from Osaka-umeda
- Platforms: 1 island platform
- Tracks: 2

Construction
- Accessible: yes

Other information
- Status: Staffed
- Station code: HK-45
- Website: Official website

History
- Opened: March 10, 1910

Passengers
- FY2019: 16,895 daily

Services
Preceding station	Hankyu Railway	Following station
Sone HK-44 towards Osaka-umeda	Takarazuka Main Line Local	Toyonaka HK-46 towards Takarazuka
Sone HK-44 towards Osaka-umeda	Takarazuka Main Line Semi-Express	Toyonaka HK-46 One-way operation
Location
- Location within Osaka Prefecture Location within Japan

Okamachi Station (岡町駅, Okamachi-eki; station number: HK-45) is a passenger railway station located in the city of Toyonaka, Osaka Prefecture, Japan. It is operated by the private transportation company Hankyu Railway.

== Lines ==
Okamachi Station is served by the Hankyu Takarazuka Line, and is located 9.5 kilometers from the terminus of the line at Osaka-umeda.

== Layout ==
The station consists of one elevated island platform with the station facilities underneath. The ticket gate and concourse are on the 2nd floor, and the platform is on the 3rd floor. There is only one ticket gate.

=== Platforms ===
1	■ Takarazuka Line	for Takarazuka, Kawanishi-noseguchi, Ishibashi handai-mae and Minoo
2	■ Takarazuka Line	for Osaka-umeda

== History ==
Okamachi Station opened on 10 March 1910.

Station numbering was introduced to all Hankyu stations on 21 December 2013 with this station being designated as station number HK-45.

== Passenger statistics ==
In fiscal 2019, the station was used by an average of 16,895 passengers daily

== Surrounding area ==
- Toyonaka City Hall
- Sakurazuka Kofun
- Oishizuka Kofun

== See also ==
- List of railway stations in Japan
