= Hattori-tenjin Station =

Railway station in Toyonaka, Osaka Prefecture, Japan

Hattori-tenjin Station 服部天神駅
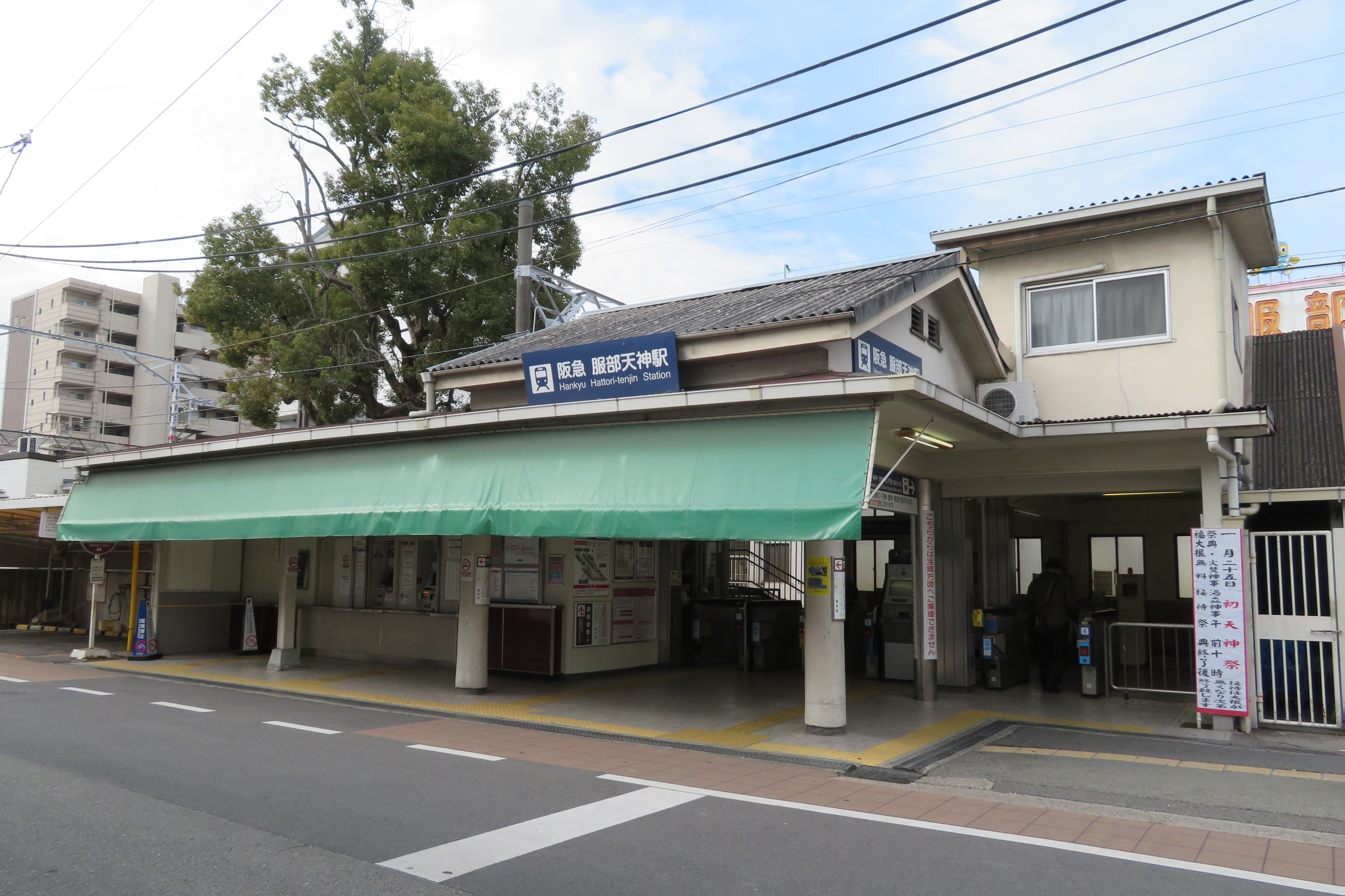
- Hattori-tenjin Station east exit, 2020

General information
- Location: 1-chōme-1 Hattori Motomachi, Toyonaka-shi, Osaka-fu 561-0851
- Coordinates: 34°45′47.93″N 135°28′29.80″E
- Operator: Hankyu Railway
- Line: ■ Takarazuka Main Line
- Distance: 7.5 km (4.7 miles) from Osaka-umeda
- Platforms: 2 side platforms
- Tracks: 2

Construction
- Accessible: yes

Other information
- Status: Staffed
- Station code: HK-43
- Website: Official website

History
- Opened: 10 March 1910

Passengers
- FY2019: 23,920 daily

Services
Preceding station	Hankyu Railway	Following station
Shōnai HK-42 towards Osaka-umeda	Takarazuka Main Line Local	Sone HK-44 towards Takarazuka
Location
- Location within Osaka Prefecture Location within Japan

Hattori-tenjin Station (服部天神駅, Hattori-tenjin-eki; station number: HK-43) is a passenger railway station located in the city of Toyonaka, Osaka Prefecture, Japan. It is operated by the private transportation company Hankyu Railway.

== Lines ==
Hattori-tenjin Station is served by the Hankyu Takarazuka Line, and is located 7.5 kilometers from the terminus of the line at Osaka-umeda.

== Layout ==
The station consists of two opposed ground-level side platforms. There is no connection between platforms within the station, and passengers wishing to change platforms must use the railroad crossing in front of the station outside the ticket gate, but during rush hours, it becomes a so-called "unopened railroad crossing", and there was no end to the reckless crossing by pedestrians. In addition, since there is a lot of traffic at the railroad crossing in front of the station, there was a request from local residents to install a footbridge on the platform, but it was not installed as it was not possible to secure the land necessary for construction. However, in March 2018, an underground passage was finally built outside the station, making it possible to change lines without using the railroad crossing, even though it is outside the ticket gate.

=== Platforms ===
1	■ Takarazuka Line	for Takarazuka, Kawanishi-noseguchi, Ishibashi handai-mae and Minoo
2	■ Takarazuka Line	for Osaka-umeda

== History ==
Hattori-tenjin Station opened on 10 March 1910, but the name was changed to "Hattori Station" around 1913. The station name was changed from Hattori Station (服部駅, Hattori-eki) from 21 December 2013.

Station numbering was introduced to all Hankyu stations on 21 December 2013 with this station being designated as station number HK-43.

== Passenger statistics ==
In fiscal 2019, the station was used by an average of 23,920 passengers daily

== Surrounding area ==
- Hattori Tenjin Shrine
- Hattori Sumiyoshi Shrine

== See also ==
- List of railway stations in Japan
