= Mikuni Station =

Mikuni Station (三国駅) is the name of two train stations in Japan:

- Mikuni Station (Fukui)
- Mikuni Station (Osaka)
