= Yamamoto Station =

Yamamoto Station (山本駅) is the name of two train stations in Japan:

- Yamamoto Station (Hyogo)
- Yamamoto Station (Saga)
