= Hibarigaoka-Hanayashiki Station =

Railway station in Takarazuka, Hyōgo Prefecture, Japan

Hibarigaoka-Hanayashiki Station 雲雀丘花屋敷駅
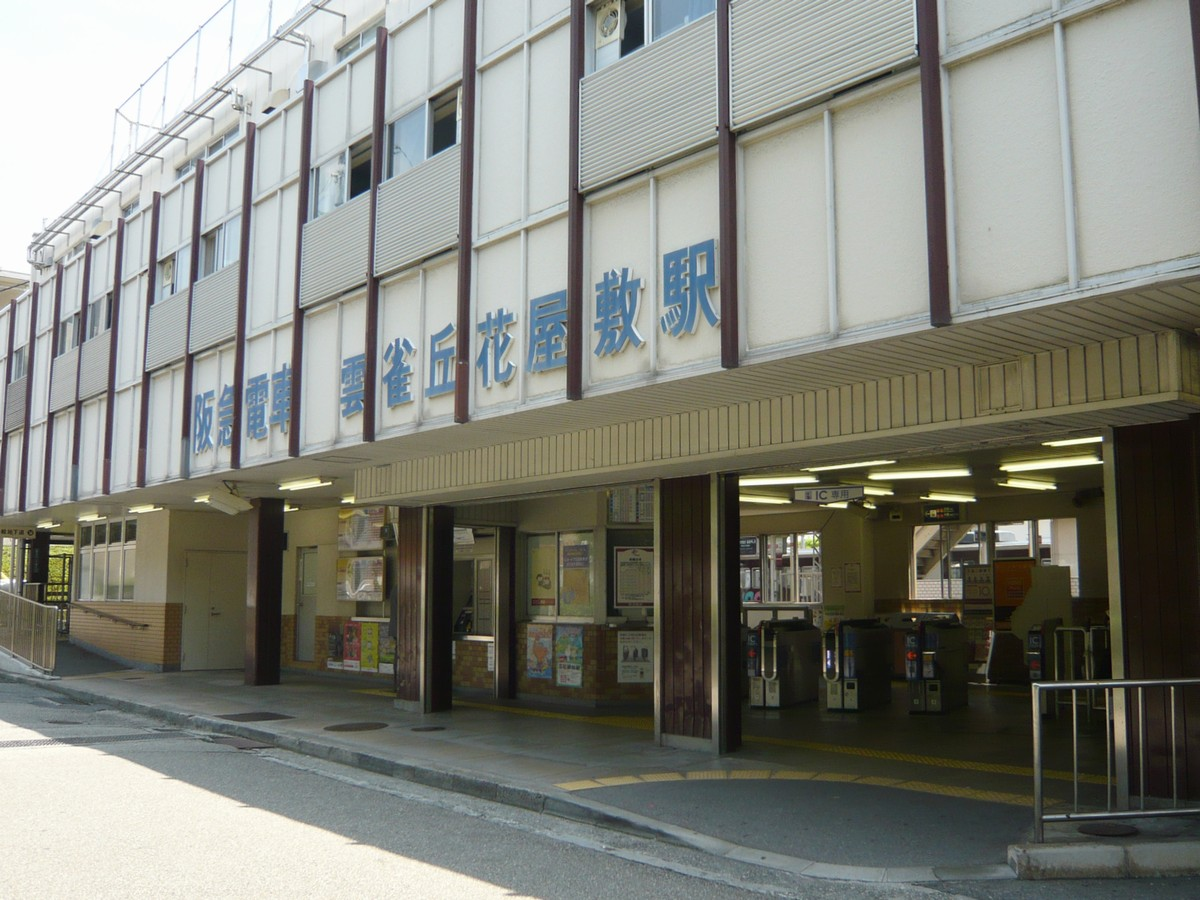
- Hibarigaoka-Hanayashiki Station, August 2007

General information
- Location: 11-1-10 Hibarigaoka, Takarazuka-she, Hyōgo-ken 666-0035; Japan
- Coordinates: 34°49′37.95″N 135°24′8.68″E
- Operator: Hankyu Railway.
- Line: ■ Hankyu Takarazuka Line
- Distance: 18.2 km (11.3 miles) from Osaka-umeda
- Platforms: 2 island platforms

Other information
- Status: Staffed
- Station code: HK51
- Website: Official website

History
- Opened: 16 January 1961

Passengers
- FY2016: 10,010 daily

Services
Preceding station	Hankyu Railway	Following station
Kawanishi-Noseguchi towards Osaka-umeda	Takarazuka Main Line Local Express	Yamamoto towards Takarazuka
Kawanishi-Noseguchi towards Osaka-umeda	Takarazuka Main Line Semi-Express	Yamamoto One-way operation
Location
- Location within Hyōgo Prefecture Location within Japan

Hibarigaoka-Hanayashiki Station (雲雀丘花屋敷駅, Hibarigaoka-Hanayashiki-eki; station number: HK51) is a passenger railway station located in the city of Takarazuka Hyōgo Prefecture, Japan. It is operated by the private transportation company Hankyu Railway.

== Lines ==
Hibarigaoka-Hanayashiki Station is served by the Hankyu Takarazuka Line, and is located 18.2 kilometers from the terminus of the line at Osaka-umeda.

== Station layout ==
The station two elevated island platform serving four tracks, with the station building underneath. The effective length of the platform is for 10 cars. The inner two lines (Lines 2 and 3) are the main lines, and the outer two lines (Lines 1 and 4) are side tracks. The latter is mainly used by trains that start and end at this station.

=== Platforms ===
1	■ Takarazuka Line	starting trains
2	■ Takarazuka Line	for Takarazuka, Nigawa, Nishinomiya-kitaguchi, Imazu and Kobe
3	■ Takarazuka Line	for Osaka (Umeda), Minoo, Kyoto and Kita-Senri
4	■ Takarazuka Line	starting Hibarigaoka-Hanayashiki for Osaka (Umeda)

== History ==
Hibarigaoka-Hanayashiki Station opened on January 16, 1961.

== Passenger statistics ==
In fiscal 2016, the station was used by an average of 10,010 passengers daily

== Surrounding area ==
- Toyo College of Food Technology

== See also ==
- List of railway stations in Japan
