= Mikuni Station (Osaka) =

Railway station in Osaka, Japan

Coordinates: 34°44′15″N 135°28′59″E

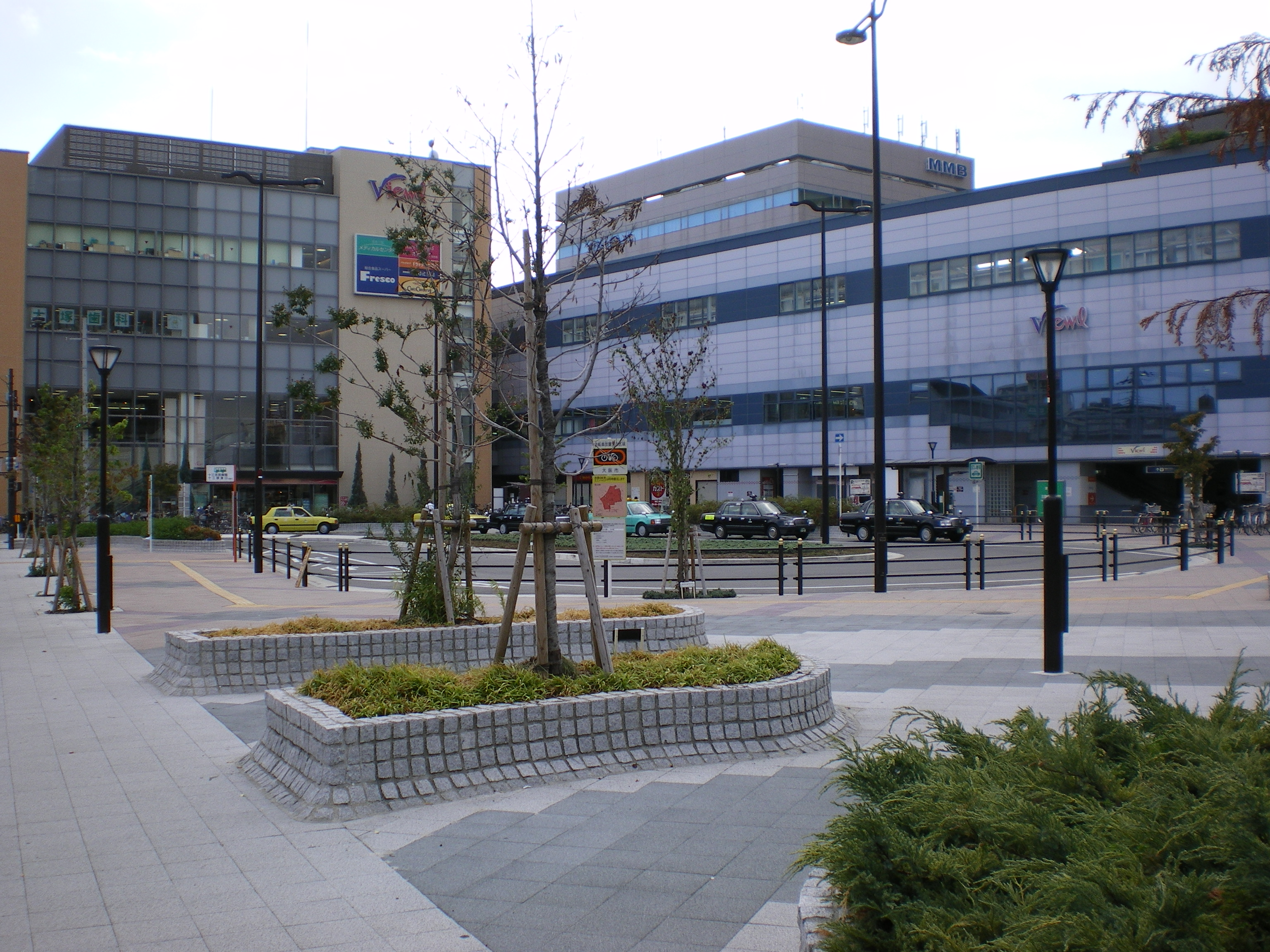
East side of the station

Mikuni Station (三国駅, Mikuni-eki) is a railway station in Yodogawa-ku, Osaka, Osaka Prefecture, Japan, on the Hankyu Takarazuka Line operated by the Hankyu Railway.

== Lines ==
- Hankyu Takarazuka Line

== Adjacent stations ==
Preceding station	Hankyu Railway	Following station
Jūsō HK-03 towards Osaka-umeda	Takarazuka Main Line Local	Shōnai HK-42 towards Takarazuka

== See also ==
- List of railway stations in Japan

== Mentions ==
Mikuni Station (三国駅, Mikuni-eki), is also mentioned by the japanese artist aiko, in song that goes by the same name, referencing her youth she spend near the station.
