= Yamamoto Station (Hyōgo) =

Railway station in Takarazuka, Hyōgo Prefecture, Japan

Yamamoto Station 山本駅
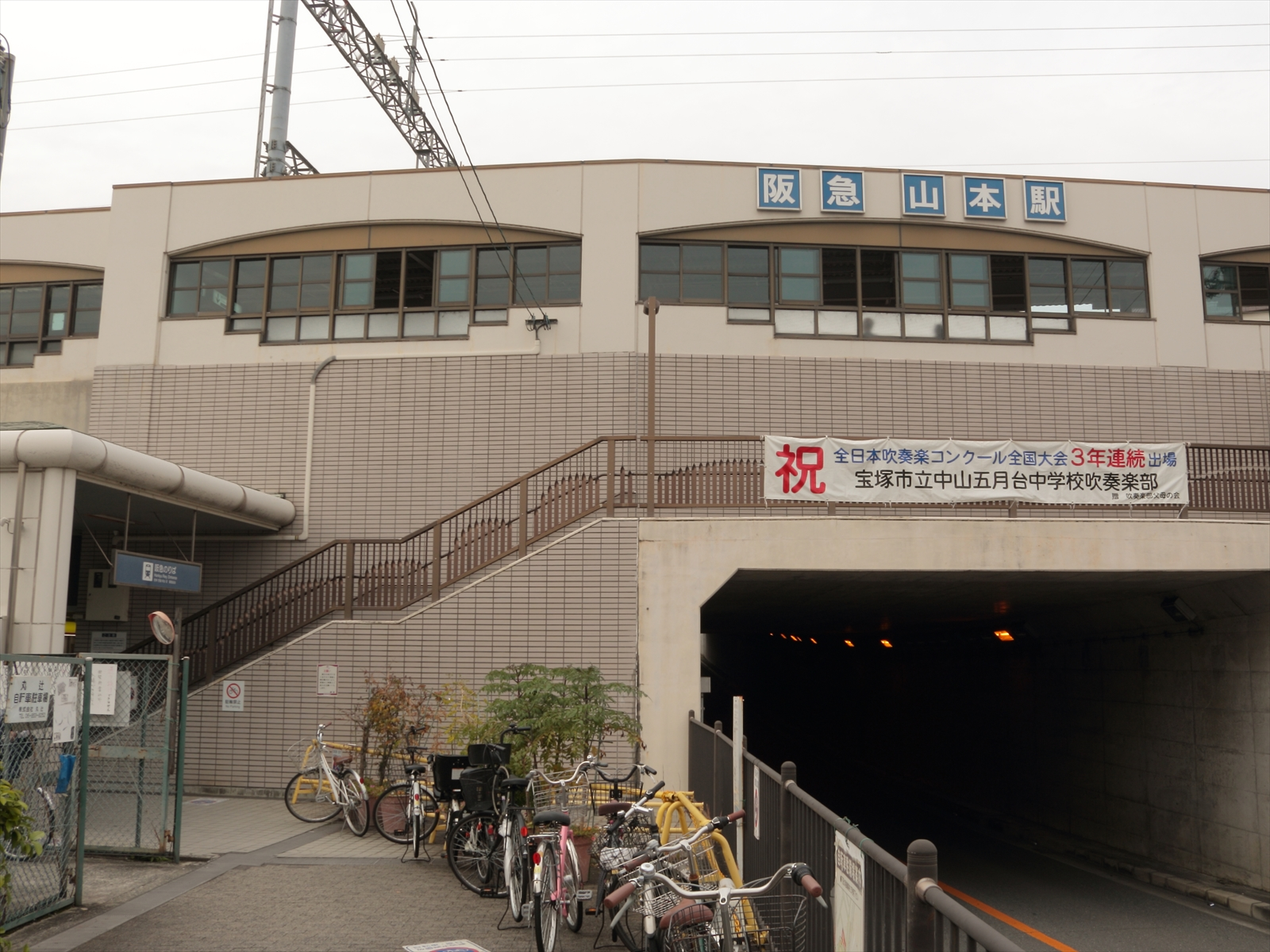
- Station building, October 2015

General information
- Other names: Hirai
- Location: 1-chōme-1 Hirai, Takarazuka-shi, Hyōgo-ken 665-0816; Japan
- Coordinates: 34°49′18.94″N 135°23′18.49″E
- Operator: Hankyu Railway
- Line: ■ Takarazuka Main Line
- Distance: 19.7 km (12.2 miles) from Osaka-umeda
- Platforms: 2 side platforms
- Tracks: 2

Other information
- Status: Staffed
- Station code: HK-52
- Website: Official website

History
- Opened: March 10, 1910

Passengers
- FY2016: 19,285 daily

Services
Preceding station	Hankyu Railway	Following station
Hibarigaoka-Hanayashiki towards Osaka-umeda	Takarazuka Main Line Local Express	Nakayama-kannon towards Takarazuka
Hibarigaoka-Hanayashiki towards Osaka-umeda	Takarazuka Main Line Semi-Express	Nakayama-kannon One-way operation
Location
- Location within Hyōgo Prefecture Location within Japan

Yamamoto Station (山本駅, Yamamoto-eki; station number: HK-52) is a passenger railway station located in the city of Takarazuka Hyōgo Prefecture, Japan. It is operated by the private transportation company Hankyu Railway.

== Lines ==
Yamamoto Station is served by the Hankyu Takarazuka Line, and is located 19.7 kilometers from the terminus of the line at Osaka-umeda.

== Layout ==
The station consists of two opposed side platforms, connected by an underground passage, with the ticket gate also located underground, because the station is located at the foot of a mountain. In the square on the north side of the station, there is an underground bicycle parking lot and a bus and taxi stand.

=== Platforms ===
1	■ Takarazuka Line	for Takarazuka, Nishinomiya-Kitaguchi, Imazu and Kōbe
2	■ Takarazuka Line	for Ōsaka (Umeda), Minoo, Kyōto and Kita-Senri

== History ==
Yamamoto station opened on March 10, 1910, the day the Takarazuka Line started operation. Hirai Station opened October 23 the same year. On September 1, 1944, two stations were merged to a new station facility under the station name Yamamoto.

The name Hirai was however retained as a secondary name in response to the local community's request and the running in boards of the station also reads Hirai (平井) in parentheses and in small letters next to the official name Yamamoto.

== Passenger statistics ==
In fiscal 2019, the station was used by an average of 19,285 passengers daily

== Surrounding area ==
- Aiai Park (about 5 minutes on foot)
- Itami City Aramaki Rose Park (about 20 minutes on foot)

== See also ==
- List of railway stations in Japan
