= Hankyu 1000 series =

Japanese train type

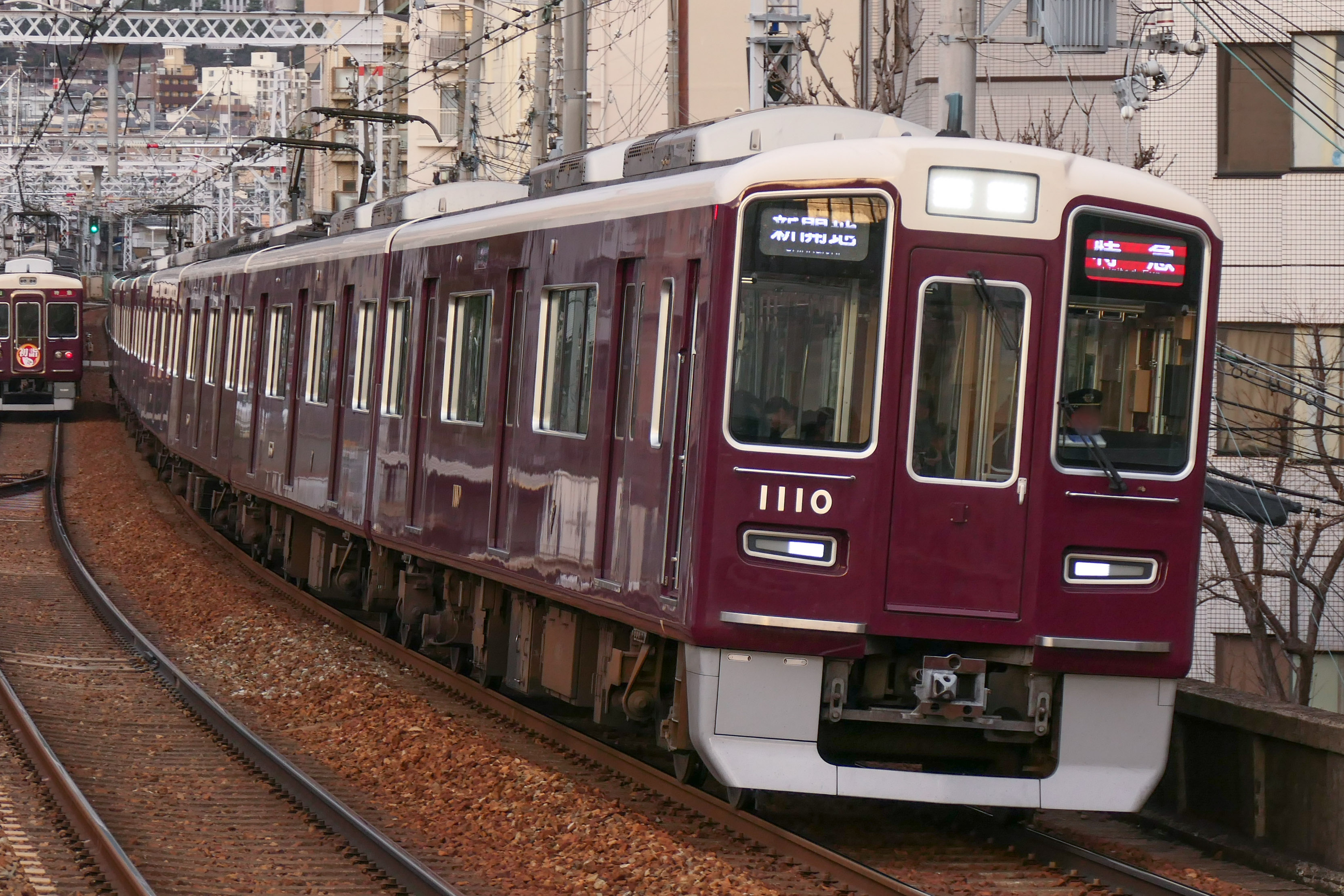
- Set 1010 in service, January 2020
- In service: 28 November 2013 – present
- Manufacturer: Hitachi
- Built at: Kudamatsu, Yamaguchi
- Family name: A-train
- Constructed: 2013–
- Number built: 152 cars (19 sets)
- Number in service: 152 cars (19 sets)
- Formation: 8 cars per trainset
- Fleet numbers: 1000–
- Capacity: 1,022 per set
- Operator: Hankyu Corporation
- Depots: Hirai; Nishinomiya
- Lines served: Hankyu Kobe Main Line; Hankyu Takarazuka Main Line; Nose Railway Myōken Line; Nose Railway Nissei Line

Specifications
- Car body construction: Aluminium alloy, double-skin
- Car length: 19,000 mm (62 ft 4 in)
- Width: 2,770 mm (9 ft 1 in)
- Height: 4,095 mm (13 ft 5.2 in)
- Doors: 3 pairs of sliding doors per side
- Maximum speed: 115 km/h (71 mph) (service); 130 km/h (81 mph) (design)
- Traction system: Variable frequency (IGBT)
- Traction motors: Permanent magnet synchronous motors
- Acceleration: 2.6 km/(h⋅s) (1.6 mph/s)
- Deceleration: 3.7 km/(h⋅s) (2.3 mph/s) (service); 4.2 km/(h⋅s) (2.6 mph/s) (emergency)
- Electric system: 1,500 V DC
- Current collection: Pantograph
- Bogies: FS579M (motored), FS579T (trailer)
- Braking system: Electronically controlled pneumatic brakes with regenerative braking
- Safety system: ATS
- Coupling system: Shibata
- Track gauge: 1,435 mm (4 ft 8 1/2 in)

The Hankyu 1000 series (阪急電鉄1000系, Hankyū dentetsu 1000-kei) is a commuter electric multiple unit (EMU) train type operated by the private railway operator Hankyu Corporation on Hankyu Kobe Main Line services since November 2013, and on the Hankyu Takarazuka Main Line since December 2013.

== Overview ==
Based on the 9000 series and 9300 series EMUs first introduced in 2003, the 8-car 1000 series trains are manufactured by Hitachi and have aluminium alloy bodies with a double-skin construction. The trains are driven by fully enclosed permanent magnet synchronous motors (PMSM) supplied by Toshiba Corporation. Externally, the trains are finished in the standard Hankyu colour scheme of all-over maroon.

== Formation ==
As of 1 April 2016, nine eight-car trains (units 1000 to 1008) are in service, formed as shown below, with four motored (M) cars and four non-powered trailer (T) cars.

| Designation | Tc | M | M' | T | T | M | M' | Tc |
| Numbering | 1000 | 1500 | 1600 | 1050 | 1150 | 1550 | 1650 | 1100 |
| Weight (t) | 29.8 | 36.7 | 33.3 | 25.9 | 25.9 | 36.7 | 33.3 | 29.8 |
| Capacity (total/seated) | 121/43 | 130/49 | 130/49 | 130/49 | 130/49 | 130/49 | 130/49 | 121/43 |

The "M" cars (1500 and 1550) each have two single-arm pantographs.

== Interior ==
Passenger accommodation consists of longitudinal bench seating throughout, with "golden olive" coloured moquette seat covers. Internally, the trains use LED lighting throughout. Each car includes a wheelchair space at one end.

Passenger information is provided by 32-inch half-height LCD displays supplied by Toshiba Corporation, with information provided in Japanese, English, Chinese, and Korean.

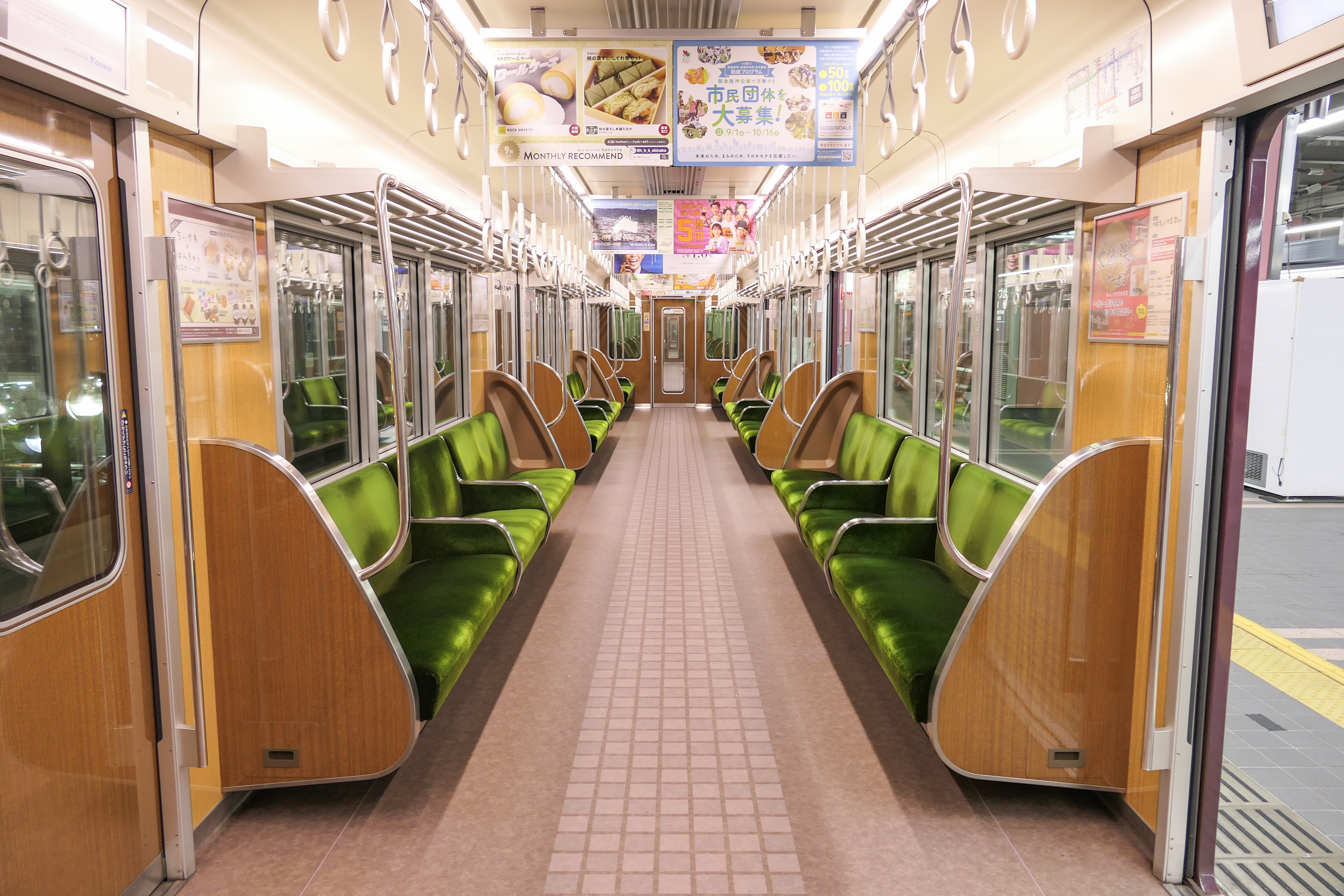
Interior

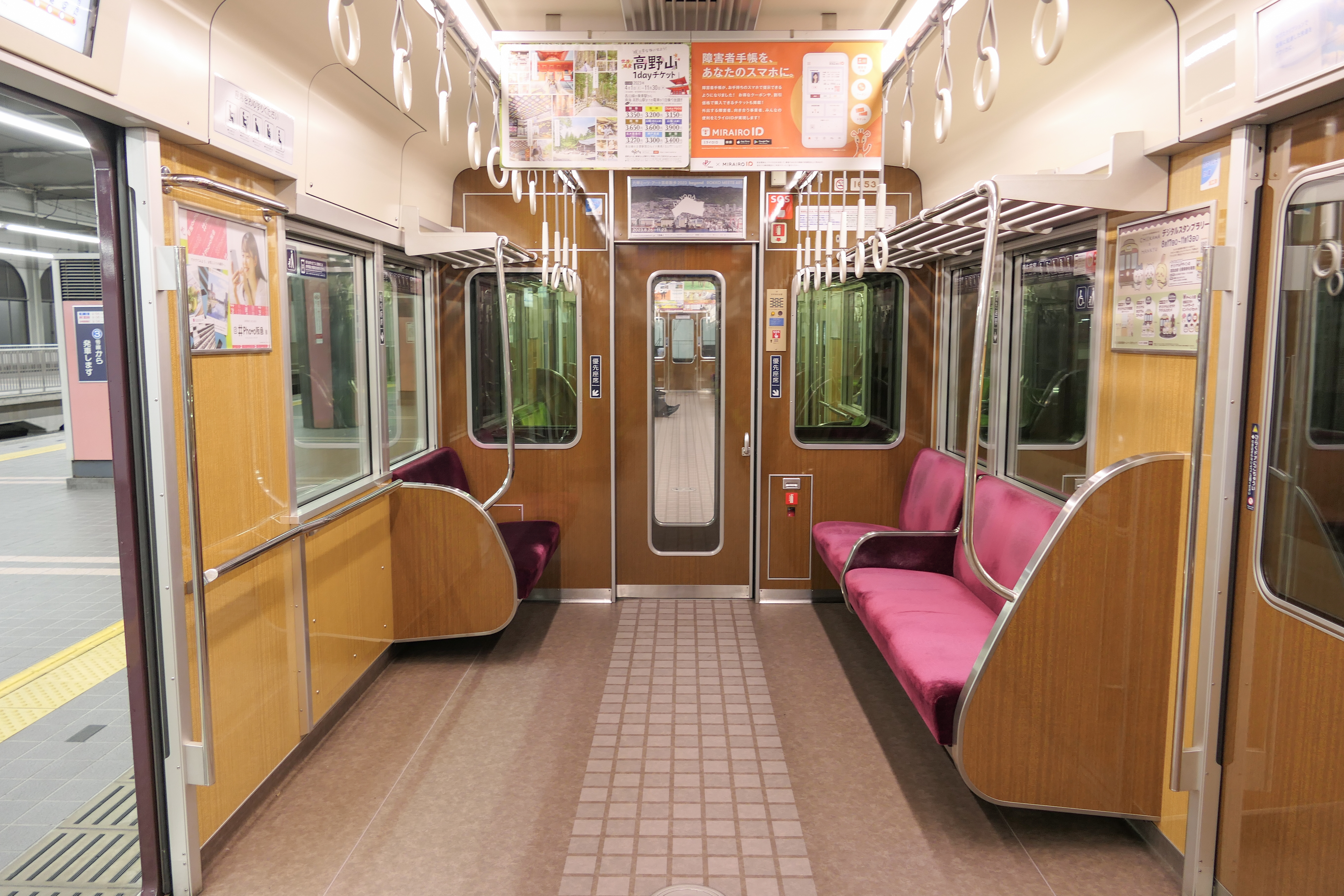
Priority seating

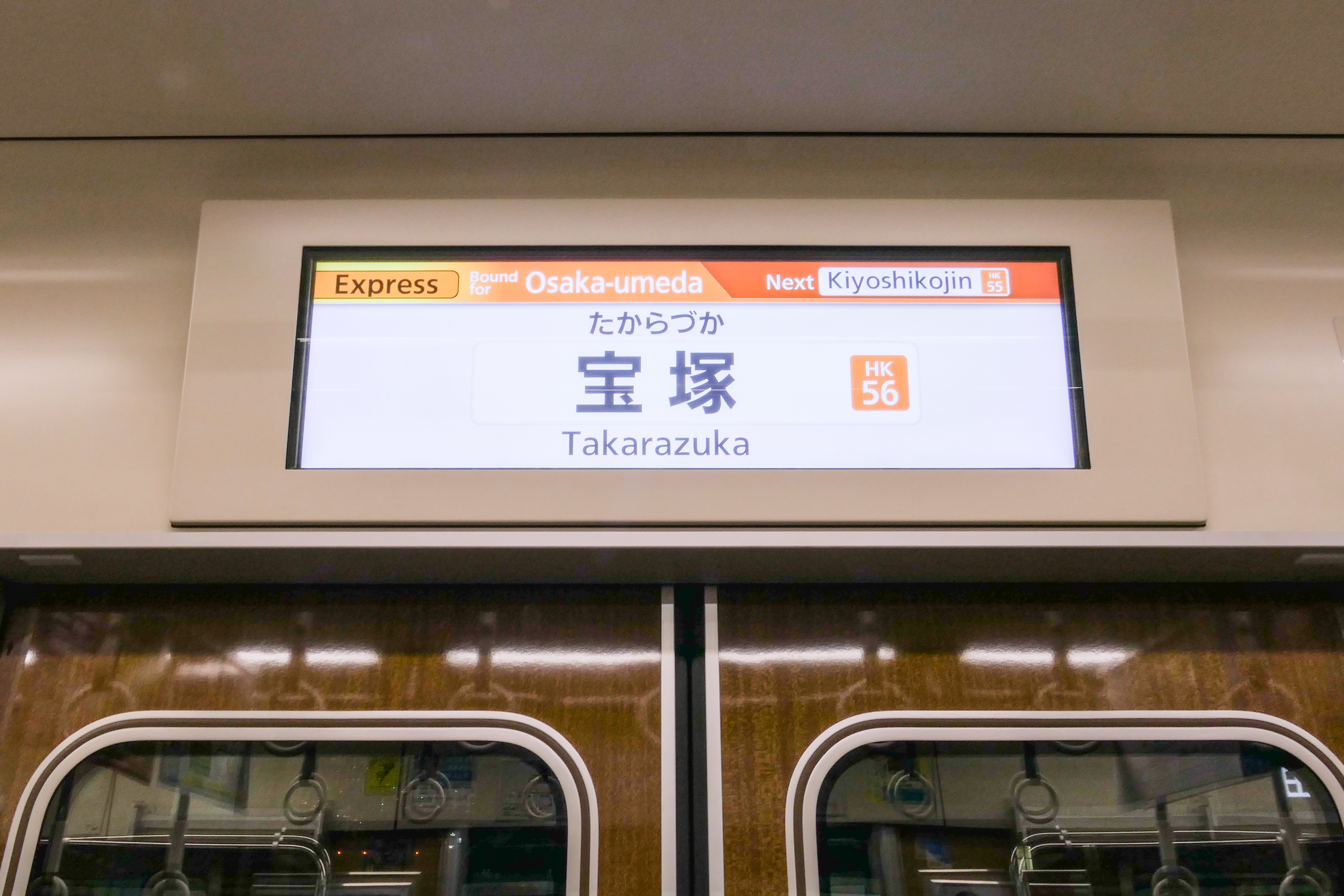
LCD passenger information display

== History ==
The first set, 1000, underwent test running from October 2013. It entered passenger service from 28 November 2013, following a special departure ceremony at Umeda Station. The first Takarazuka Line set, 1001, entered service on 25 December 2013.

== Fleet history ==
The build details for the fleet are as shown below.

| Set No. | Date delivered | Allocation |
|---|---|---|
| 1000 | 19 November 2013 | Kobe Line |
| 1001 | 24 December 2013 | Takarazuka Line (2013–2026); Kobe Line (2026–) |
| 1002 | 14 July 2014 | Kobe Line |
| 1003 | 9 September 2014 | Takarazuka Line |
| 1004 | 9 April 2015 | Takarazuka Line |
| 1005 | 12 June 2015 | Kobe Line |
| 1006 | 4 September 2015 | Takarazuka Line |
| 1007 | 22 October 2015 | Kobe Line |
| 1008 | 29 January 2016 | Kobe Line |
| 1009 | June 2016 | Takarazuka Line |
| 1010 | 23 March 2017 | Kobe Line |
| 1011 | 2017 | Kobe Line |
| 1012 | 2017 | Takarazuka Line |
| 1013 | 5 March 2018 | Takarazuka Line |
| 1014 | 22 March 2018 | Kobe Line |
| 1015 | 4 October 2018 | Takarazuka Line |
| 1016 | 14 February 2019 | Kobe Line |
| 1017 | 26 March 2019 | Kobe Line |
| 1018 | 18 March 2020 | Takarazuka Line |

== See also ==
- Hankyu 1300 series, a similar variant for use on the Kyoto Lines from 2014
