= Hankyu 1000 series (1954) =

Japanese train type

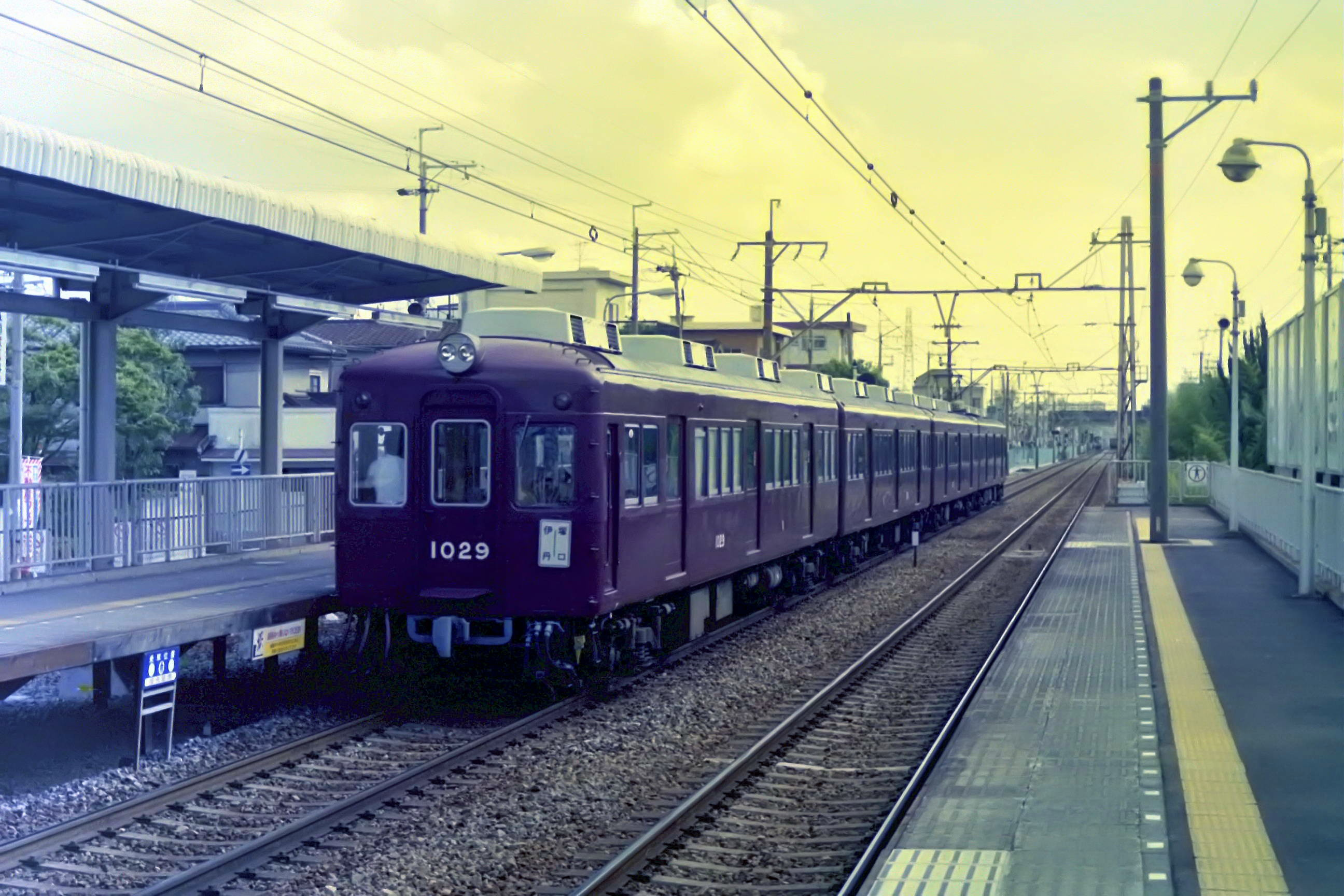
- A 1010 series train retrofitted with air-conditioning
- In service: 1954–1989
- Constructed: 1954–1961
- Scrapped: 1984–1991
- Number built: 39 cars
- Number in service: None
- Formation: 2/3/4 cars per trainset
- Operators: Hankyu Corporation
- Lines served: Hankyu Kobe Main Line

Specifications
- Car body construction: Steel
- Car length: 19,000 mm (62 ft 4 in)
- Width: 2,750 mm (9 ft 0 in)
- Doors: 2/3 per side
- Electric system(s): 600 V DC, later 1,500 V DC overhead lines
- Current collection: Pantograph
- Track gauge: 1,435 mm (4 ft 8 1/2 in)

The Hankyu 1000 series (阪急電鉄1000系, Hankyū dentetsu 1000-kei) was a commuter electric multiple unit (EMU) train type operated by the private railway operator Hankyu Corporation on the Hankyu Kobe Main Line from 1954 until 1989.

== Variants ==
- 1000 series: 4 cars built in 1954
- 1010 series: 35 cars built between 1956 and 1960 for use on the Kobe Main Line

== 1000 series ==
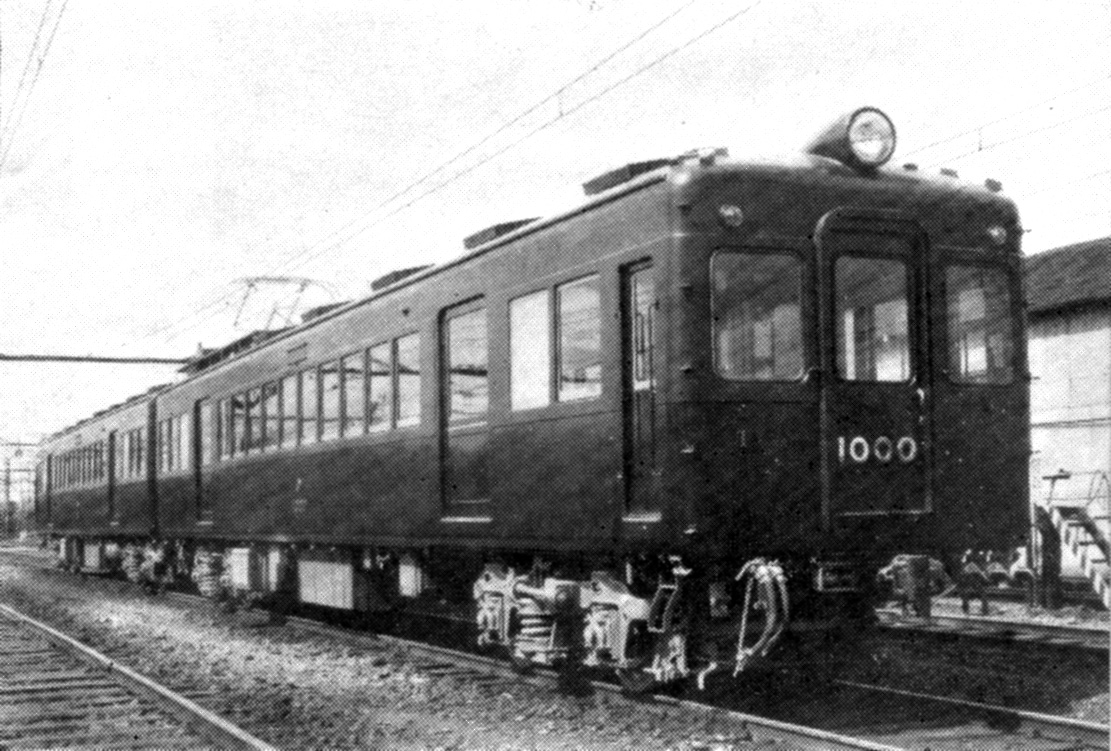
Set 1000+1001 in 1956

Two 2-car 1000 series sets were delivered in 1954, consisting of cars 1000 + 1001 and 1002 + 1003. Each car was motored, equipped with four 75 kW motors. The cars were mounted on Sumitomo FS-303 bogies, although car 1002 was used experimentally with FS-305 Alstom-link bogies.

Passenger accommodation consisted of longitudinal bench seating throughout. Interior lighting used fluorescent tubes powered by a 200 V AC, 120 Hz supply.

== 1010 series ==
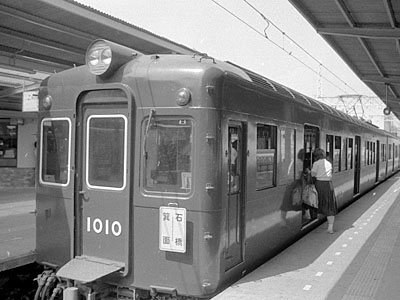
1010 series set 1010 circa 1979

=== 1st batch ===
Following trials of the initial two 1000 series sets, full production commenced in 1956, with two semi-permanently coupled 2-car sets (1010 + 1011 and 1012 + 1013).

=== 2nd batch ===
The second batch appeared in 1957, consisting of twelve cars (three pairs of semi-permanently coupled 2-car sets), numbered 1014 to 1025. These differed from the first-batch units in having a non-powered trailer ("Tc") car at the Kobe end. The trailer cars were however designed to be able to be easily modified as motor cars in the future, and hence were numbered in the same numbering series as other motor cars.

=== 3rd batch ===
The third batch appeared in 1958, consisting of two 2-car sets, numbered 1026 to 1029. These consisted on one motored (Mc) and one trailer (Tc) car and were coupled to the two first-batch 2-car sets to form sets consisting of three motored cars and one trailer car (1010-1011+1026-1027 and 1012-1013+1028-1029).

=== 4th batch ===
The fourth batch appeared in 1959, consisting of eleven cars (two pairs of semi-permanently coupled 2-car sets plus three intermediate trailer cars), numbered 1030 to 1037 and 1050 to 1052. All of these cars except 1052 had three doors per side instead of the earlier two. The three trailer cars were inserted between pairs of original driving motor (Mc) cars to form five-car (Mc-T-Mc+Mc-Tc) sets.

=== 5th batch ===
The fifth batch appeared in 1960, consisting of a further four intermediate trailer (T) cars, numbered 1053 to 1056. These cars had two doors per side.

== Later developments ==
Some of the 1010 series cars were retrofitted with roof-mounted air-conditioning between 1976 and 1977.

== Withdrawal and resale ==
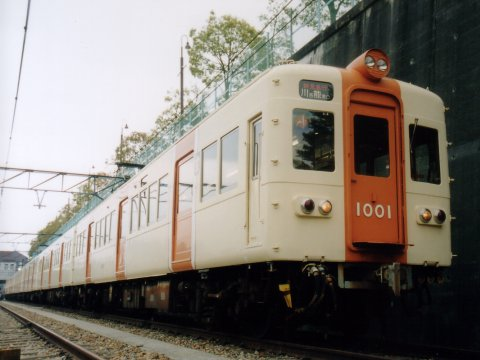
Nose Electric Railway 1000 series set 1001 (former Hankyu 1100 series) in 2001

The four original 1000 series cars were withdrawn in March 1984. Scrapping of the 1010 series cars began in 1985, and a final special run was held on 5 March 1989 between Umeda and Takarazuka, with the last remaining cars ultimately being scrapped in 1991. One 1010 series four-car set was sold to the Nose Electric Railway, classified as 1000 series.

== See also ==
- Hankyu 1100 series, a similar variant introduced on the Takarazuka Line from 1956
- Hankyu 1300 series (1957), a similar variant introduced on the Kyoto Lines from 1957
