= Hankyu 1100 series =

Japanese train type

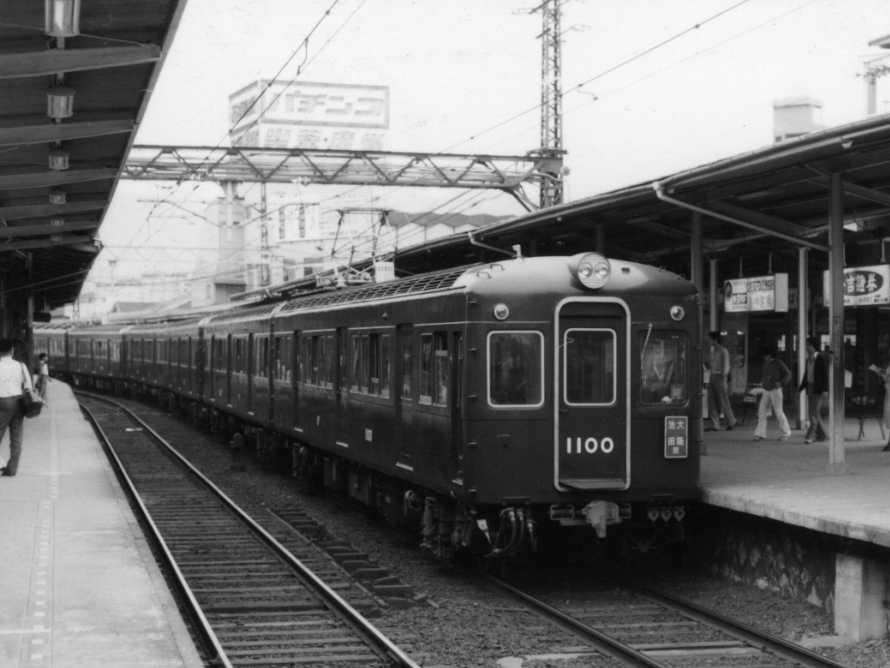
- 1100 series set 1100, September 1976
- In service: 1956–1989
- Manufacturer: Alna Koki
- Constructed: 1956–1961
- Scrapped: 1984–1991
- Number built: 51 cars
- Number in service: None
- Number preserved: None
- Number scrapped: 51 cars
- Formation: 2/3/4 cars per trainset
- Operator: Hankyu Corporation
- Line served: Hankyu Takarazuka Main Line

Specifications
- Car body construction: Steel
- Car length: 19,000 mm (62 ft 4 in)
- Width: 2,750 mm (9 ft 0 in)
- Doors: 2/3 per side
- Electric system: 600 V DC, later 1,500 V DC overhead lines
- Current collection: Pantograph
- Track gauge: 1,435 mm (4 ft 8 1/2 in)

The Hankyu 1100 series (阪急電鉄1100系, Hankyū dentetsu 1100-kei) was a commuter electric multiple unit (EMU) train type operated by the private railway operator Hankyu Corporation on the Hankyu Takarazuka Main Line from 1956 until 1989.

== Build details ==
=== 1st batch ===
As with the similar Kobe Line 1010 series sets, the 1100 series sets were built from 1956 onward, consisting of two-car sets formed of one motored car and one non-powered trailer car, with cars numbered 1100 to 1103 and 1150 to 1153.

=== 2nd batch ===
The second batch appeared in 1957, consisting of eight cars (two pairs of semi-permanently coupled 2-car sets), numbered 1104 to 1107 and 1154 to 1157.

=== 3rd batch ===
The third batch appeared in 1958, consisting of eight cars (two pairs of semi-permanently coupled 2-car sets), numbered 1108 to 1111 and 1158 to 1161. These sets differed from earlier batches in having three doors per side instead of the earlier two.

=== 4th batch ===
The fourth batch appeared in 1959, consisting of twelve cars (two pairs of semi-permanently coupled 2-car sets plus four motor (Mc) cars), numbered 1112 to 1115, 1162 to 1165, and 1140 to 1143. These all had three doors per side.

=== 5th batch ===
The fifth batch appeared in 1960, consisting of a further five driving motor trailer (Mc) cars, numbered 1144 to 1148. These cars had three doors per side.

=== 6th batch ===
The sixth batch appeared in 1961, consisting of six driving trailer (Tc) cars, numbered 1190 to 1195.

== Later developments ==
Some of the 1100 series cars were retrofitted with roof-mounted air-conditioning between 1976 and 1977.

== Withdrawal and resale ==
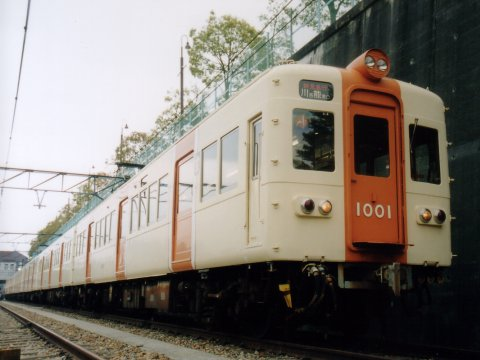
Nose Electric Railway 1000 series set 1001 in 2001

The 1100 series cars were withdrawn between 1984 and 1991. One four-car set was sold to the Nose Electric Railway, classified as 1000 series.

== See also ==
- Hankyu 1300 series (1957), a similar variant introduced on the Kyoto Lines from 1957
