= Hankyu Takarazuka Main Line =

Railway line in Japan

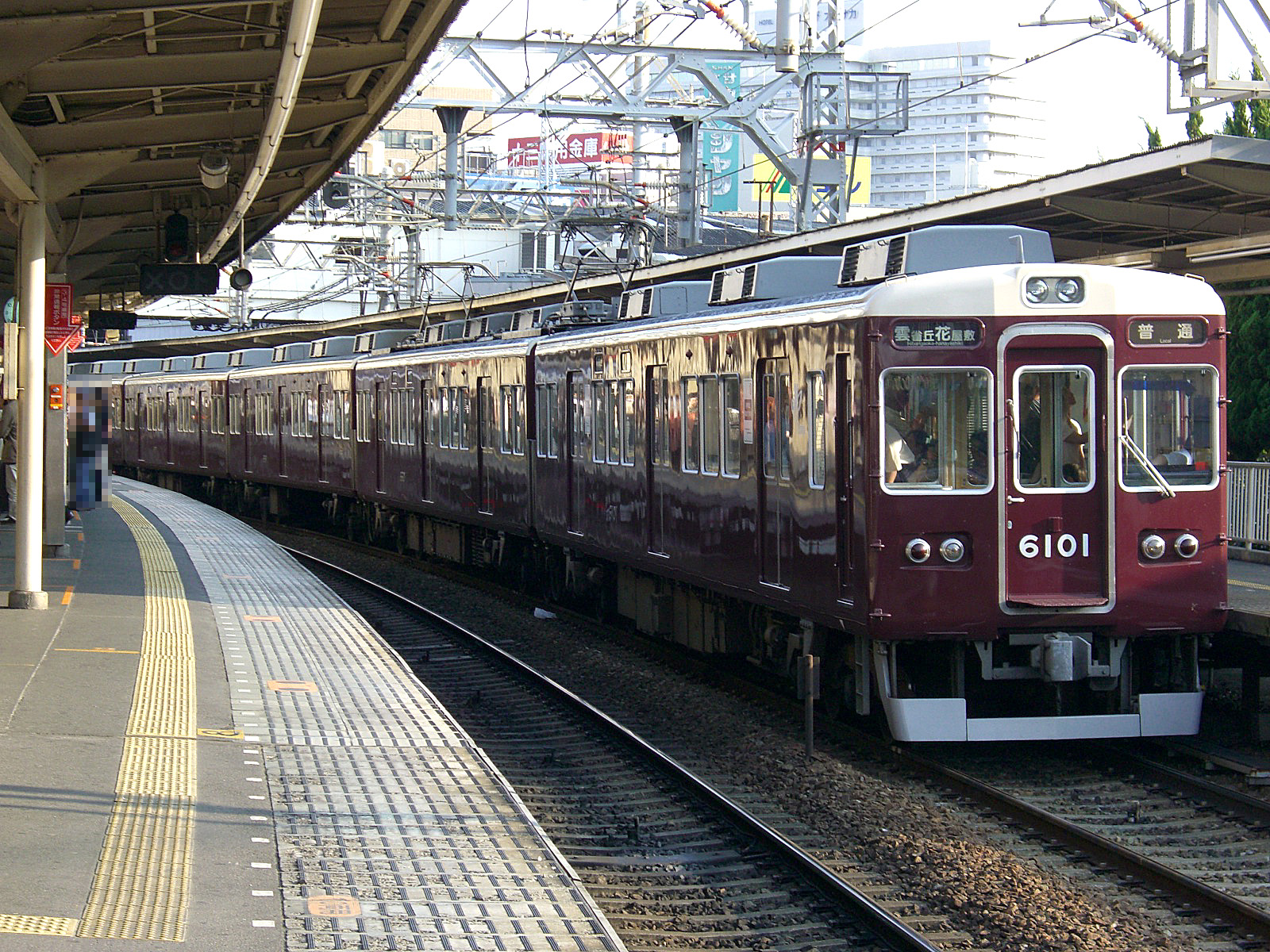
- A 6000 series EMU on a service for Hibarigaoka-Hanayashiki

Overview
- Native name: 阪急宝塚本線
- Locale: Kansai
- Termini: Osaka-umeda; Takarazuka
- Stations: 19

Service
- Operator(s): Hankyu Railway
- Depot(s): Hirai Depot

History
- Opened: 10 March 1910; 116 years ago

Technical
- Line length: 24.5 km (15.2 mi)
- Number of tracks: Quad (Osaka-umeda - Jūsō); Double (Jūsō - Takarazuka)
- Track gauge: 1,435 mm (4 ft 8 1/2 in)
- Electrification: 1,500 V DC, overhead lines
- Operating speed: 100 km/h (62 mph)
Route map

The Hankyu Takarazuka Main Line (阪急宝塚本線, Hankyū Takarazuka Honsen) is a Japanese railway line operated by the private railway operator Hankyu Railway. It connects Umeda Station in downtown Osaka with Takarazuka Station in Takarazuka, Hyogo.

It has a branch line, the Minoo Line, and the Nose Electric Railway is another longer branch line. The Imazu Line connects at Takarazuka, but it is treated as a branch of the Kobe Line.

The Takarazuka Main Line is commonly called the Takarazuka Line (宝塚線, Takarazuka sen) for short, but the name Takarazuka Line is sometimes used as the name for the network composed of the main line and the branches.

The line has numerous sharp curves from the line's origins as a tramway, built and opened by its predecessor Minoo Arima Electric Tramway (箕面有馬電気軌道, Minoo Arima Denki Kido). The sharp curves have long hindered high speed operation, contrasting to the Hankyu's other main lines, Kobe and Kyoto.

== History ==
The Minoo Arima Electric Tramway opened the entire line on 10 March 1910 as 1435mm gauge dual track, electrified at 600 VDC. Although the line was not a prospect interurban as Takarazuka was not a big city, it saw initial success thanks to the company's aggressive measures. It strategically developed housing areas along the line for the increasing white-collar population who would commute to central Osaka by train. It also opened a zoo in Minoo (on the Minoo Line) in November 1910, a hot spring in Takarazuka in May 1911, and a ballpark in Toyonaka in 1913.

The track between Umeda and Jūsō was shared with the Kobe Line from 1920 to 1926 when the original double track was replaced by an elevated four-track line.

In comparison with the Kobe Line, cars used on the Takarazuka Line were small and old. Larger (Kobe Line standard) cars could not operate on the line until 1952 due to its small structure gauge. Small cars were eliminated in December 1963. On 24 August 1969 the voltage was raised to 1500 VDC. As the commuters increased, Hankyu's first 10-car operation began on the Takarazuka Line in March 1982, but 10 car trains were discontinued again in December 2022.

Following the elevation work of Kawanishi-Noseguchi Station, through services to Nose Electric Railway began on 17 November 1997.

Since the 1970s there have been plans to build a spur line to Itami Airport from Sone Station. Although Hankyu shelved the plans in the 1980s due to capacity constraints, the plans were reportedly revived in 2017 and remain under consideration as of 2018.

== Service patterns ==
As of 11 June 2025

Local (普通, Futsū)
All-stations service
Semi-Express (準急, Junkyū)
Operated on weekday mornings from Takarazuka to Osaka-Umeda
Express (急行, Kyūkō)
Commuter Express (通勤急行, Tsūkin Kyūkō)
Operated on weekday evenings from Osaka-Umeda to Takarazuka
Commuter Limited Express (通勤特急, Tsūkin Tokkyū)
Operated on weekday mornings from Kawanishi-Noseguchi to Osaka-Umeda. The last car (Kawanishi side) is only for women.
Limited Express (特急日生エクスプレス, Tokkyū Nissei Express)
From Nissei-Chūō on Nose Electric Railway to Umeda in the morning and vice versa on weekday evenings.

== Stations ==
- ● : Trains stop.
- | : Trains pass.
- ↑: Trains pass only in one direction.

No.	Station	Japanese	Semi-Express	Express	Commuter Limited Express	Limited Express(Nissei Express)	Connections	Location	
HK-01	Osaka-umeda	大阪梅田	●	●	●	●	Hanshin Electric Railway Main Line (HS 01: Osaka-Umeda Station); Osaka Municipal Subway; Midosuji Line (M16: Umeda Station); Tanimachi Line (T20: Higashi-Umeda Station); Yotsubashi Line (Y11: Nishi-Umeda Station); JR West (Ōsaka Station); Tōkaidō Main Line; JR Kyoto Line (JR-A47); JR Kobe Line (JR-A47); JR Takarazuka Line (JR-G47); Osaka Higashi Line (JR-F01); Osaka Loop Line (JR-O11); JR Tōzai Line (JR-H44: Kitashinchi Station)	Kita-ku, Osaka	Osaka Prefecture
HK-02	Nakatsu	中津	●	|	↑	|		Kita-ku, Osaka	Osaka Prefecture
HK-03	Jūsō	十三	●	●	●	●	Hankyu Kobe Line, Hankyu Kyoto Line	Yodogawa-ku, Osaka	Osaka Prefecture
HK-41	Mikuni	三国	↑	|	↑	|		Yodogawa-ku, Osaka	Osaka Prefecture
HK-42	Shōnai	庄内	↑	|	↑	|		Toyonaka	Osaka Prefecture
HK-43	Hattori-tenjin	服部天神	↑	|	↑	|		Toyonaka	Osaka Prefecture
HK-44	Sone	曽根	●	|	↑	|		Toyonaka	Osaka Prefecture
HK-45	Okamachi	岡町	●	|	↑	|		Toyonaka	Osaka Prefecture
HK-46	Toyonaka	豊中	●	●	●	|		Toyonaka	Osaka Prefecture
HK-47	Hotarugaike	蛍池	●	●	↑	|	■ Osaka Monorail Main Line (12)	Toyonaka	Osaka Prefecture
HK-48	Ishibashi handai-mae	石橋阪大前	●	●	●	●	Hankyū Minoo Line	Ikeda	Osaka Prefecture
HK-49	Ikeda	池田	●	●	●	●		Ikeda	Osaka Prefecture
HK-50	Kawanishi-noseguchi	川西能勢口	●	●	●	●	Nose Railway Myoken Line (NS01); JR West Fukuchiyama Line (JR Takarazuka Line) (JR-G54: Kawanishi-Ikeda Station)	Kawanishi	Hyōgo Prefecture
HK-51	Hibarigaoka-Hanayashiki	雲雀丘花屋敷	●	●				Takarazuka	Hyōgo Prefecture
HK-52	Yamamoto	山本 (平井)	●	●				Takarazuka	Hyōgo Prefecture
HK-53	Nakayama-kannon	中山観音	●	●				Takarazuka	Hyōgo Prefecture
HK-54	Mefu-Jinja	売布神社	●	●				Takarazuka	Hyōgo Prefecture
HK-55	Kiyoshikōjin	清荒神	●	●				Takarazuka	Hyōgo Prefecture
HK-56	Takarazuka	宝塚 (宝塚大劇場前)	●	●			Hankyu Imazu Line; JR West Fukuchiyama Line (JR Takarazuka Line) (JR-G56)	Takarazuka	Hyōgo Prefecture
Through service:			From Kawanishi-Noseguchi: Limited Express trains to/from Nose Railway Myoken & Nissei Lines for Nissei-Chuo						

== Rolling stock ==
- 1000 series EMU (from 25 December 2013)
- 2000 series EMU (from 24 February 2025)
- 5100 series EMU
- 6000 series EMU
- 7000 series EMU
- 8000 series EMU
- 9000 series EMU
- Nose Electric Railway 6000 series EMU
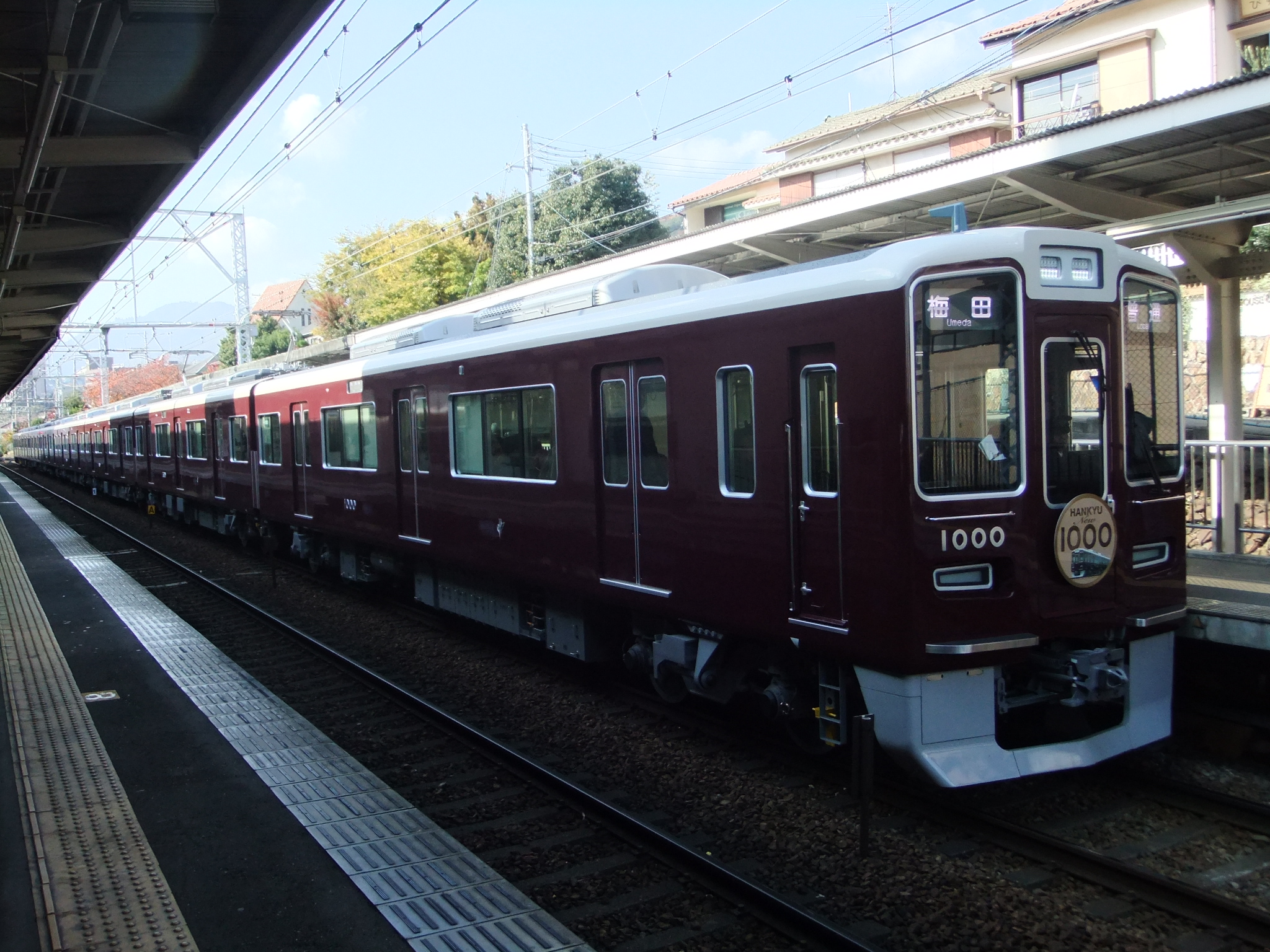
1000 series, December 2013

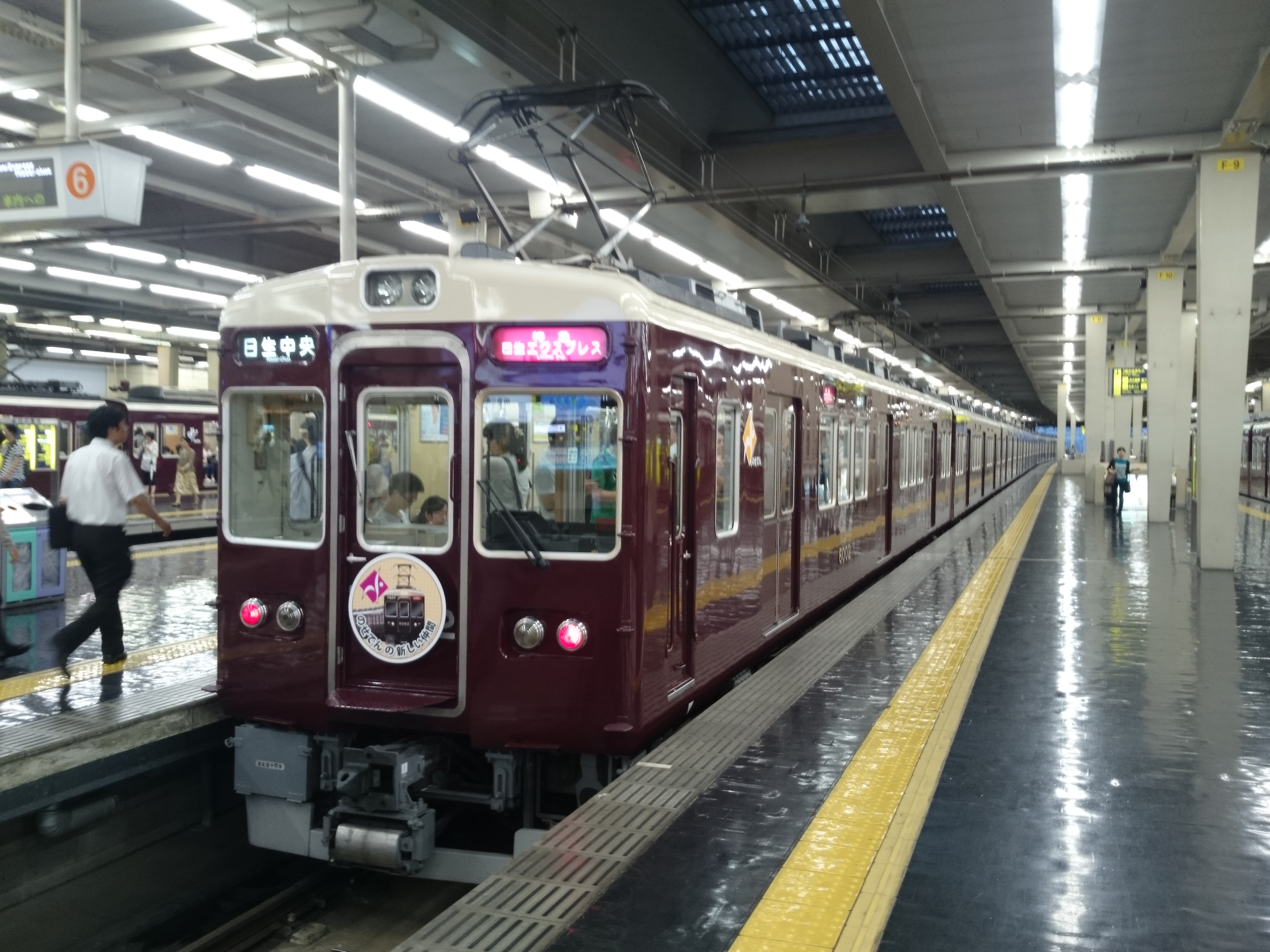
Nose Electric Railway 6000 series, August 2014

=== Former ===
- 1100 series EMU
- 1200 series EMU
- 2021 series EMU
- 2100 series EMU
- 3000 series EMU
- 3100 series EMU
