= Izuhakone 1100 series =

Japanese train type

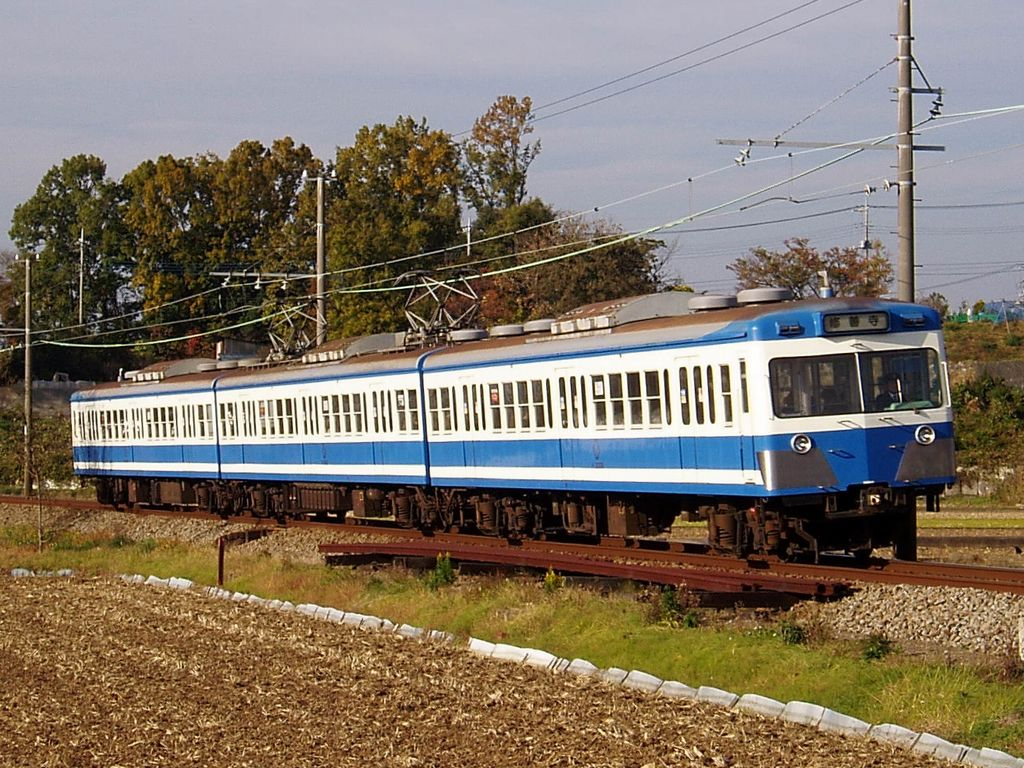
- November 2007
- In service: 1989–2012
- Constructed: 1965–1967
- Number in service: None
- Number scrapped: 9 vehicles (3 sets)
- Formation: 3 cars
- Operators: Izuhakone Railway
- Lines served: Izuhakone Railway Sunzu Line

Specifications
- Car body construction: Steel
- Doors: 3 pairs per side
- Track gauge: 1,067 mm (3 ft 6 in)

The Izuhakone 1100 series (伊豆箱根1100系) was an electric multiple unit (EMU) train type operated by the private railway operator Izuhakone Railway on its Sunzu Line in Japan from 1989 until 2012.

The 1100 series was converted from former Seibu 701 series EMUs.

The last remaining set, 1009, was withdrawn from service in June 2012.

== Formation ==
Sets were formed as follows.

Designation	Mc	M	Tc
Numbering	1000	1200	2000

The M car was fitted with two pantographs.
