= Hankyu 1300 series (1957) =

Japanese train type

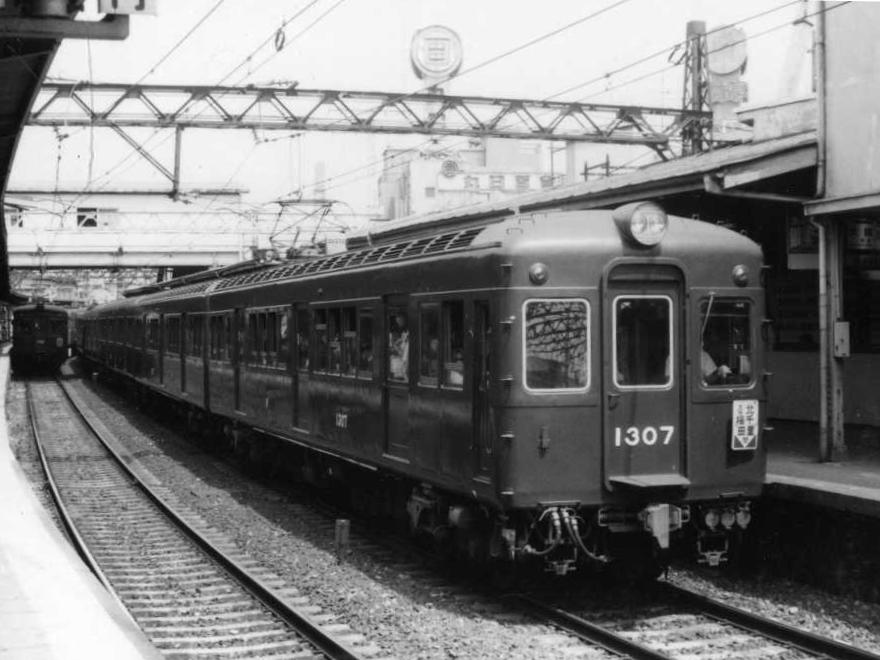
- A 1300 series train in original style, August 1975
- In service: 1957–1987
- Constructed: 1957–1961
- Scrapped: 1984–1987
- Number built: 16 cars
- Number in service: None
- Number scrapped: 16 cars
- Formation: 2/3/4 cars per trainset
- Operator: Hankyu Corporation
- Line served: Hankyu Kyoto Main Line

Specifications
- Car body construction: Steel
- Car length: 19,000 mm (62 ft 4 in)
- Width: 2,750 mm (9 ft 0 in)
- Doors: 2/3 per side
- Maximum speed: 100 km/h (60 mph)
- Electric system: 600/1,500 V DC overhead lines
- Current collection: Pantograph
- Track gauge: 1,435 mm (4 ft 8 1/2 in)

The Hankyu 1300 series (阪急電鉄1300系, Hankyū dentetsu 1300-kei) was a commuter electric multiple unit (EMU) train type operated by the private railway operator Hankyu Corporation on the Hankyu Kyoto Main Line from 1957 until 1987.

== Build details ==
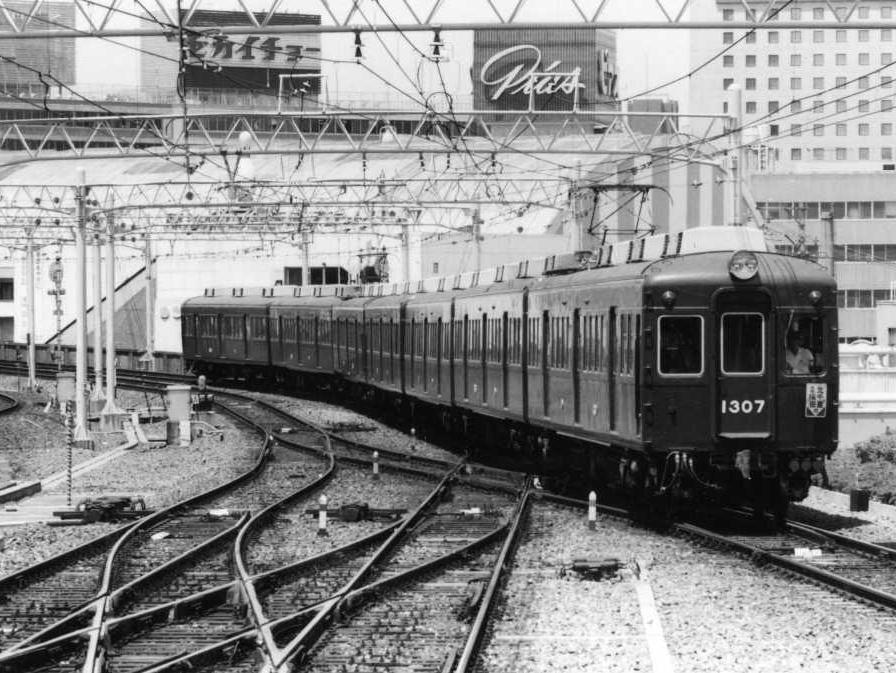
1300 series set 1307 after retrofitting of roof-mounted air-conditioning, August 1976

=== 1st batch ===
Based on the Kobe Line 1000 series and Takarazuka Line 1100 series, one three-car set (1301+1351+1302) and one two-car set (1303+1353) were delivered in 1957. Set 1301 featured transverse seating arranged in fixed 4-seat bays for use on limited-stop "limited express" services. Set 1303 had the same longitudinal bench seating as the 1000 and 1100 series sets. The sets were able to run on both 600 V and 1,500 V DC overhead power supply, as some 600 V sections still existed on Hankyu at the time of their introduction.

=== 2nd batch ===
The second batch appeared in 1959, consisting of two more three-car sets (1305+1353+1306 and 1307+1354+1308), and one intermediate trailer (T) car (1352) to lengthen the earlier two-car set 1303. Set 1307 was delivered with three doors per side instead of two per side on the earlier sets.

=== 3rd batch ===
In 1960, three intermediate trailer (T) cars, numbered 1355 to 1357, were delivered to lengthen the existing three-car sets. These all had longitudinal seating, and car 1357 had three doors per side.

=== 4th batch ===
In 1961, one more intermediate trailer (T) car, numbered 1358, was delivered. This had longitudinal seating and two doors per side.

== Later developments ==
In 1966, set 1301 was modified with longitudinal seating replacing the original transverse seating, and was no longer used on limited express services.

Most of the 1300 series cars were retrofitted with roof-mounted air-conditioning between 1975 and 1976.

== Withdrawal ==
The 1300 series were scrapped between 1984 and 1987, with no special final runs held to mark their withdrawal. None of them were preserved.
