= Takarazuka Station =

Railway station in Takarazuka, Hyōgo Prefecture, Japan

Takarazuka Station 宝塚駅
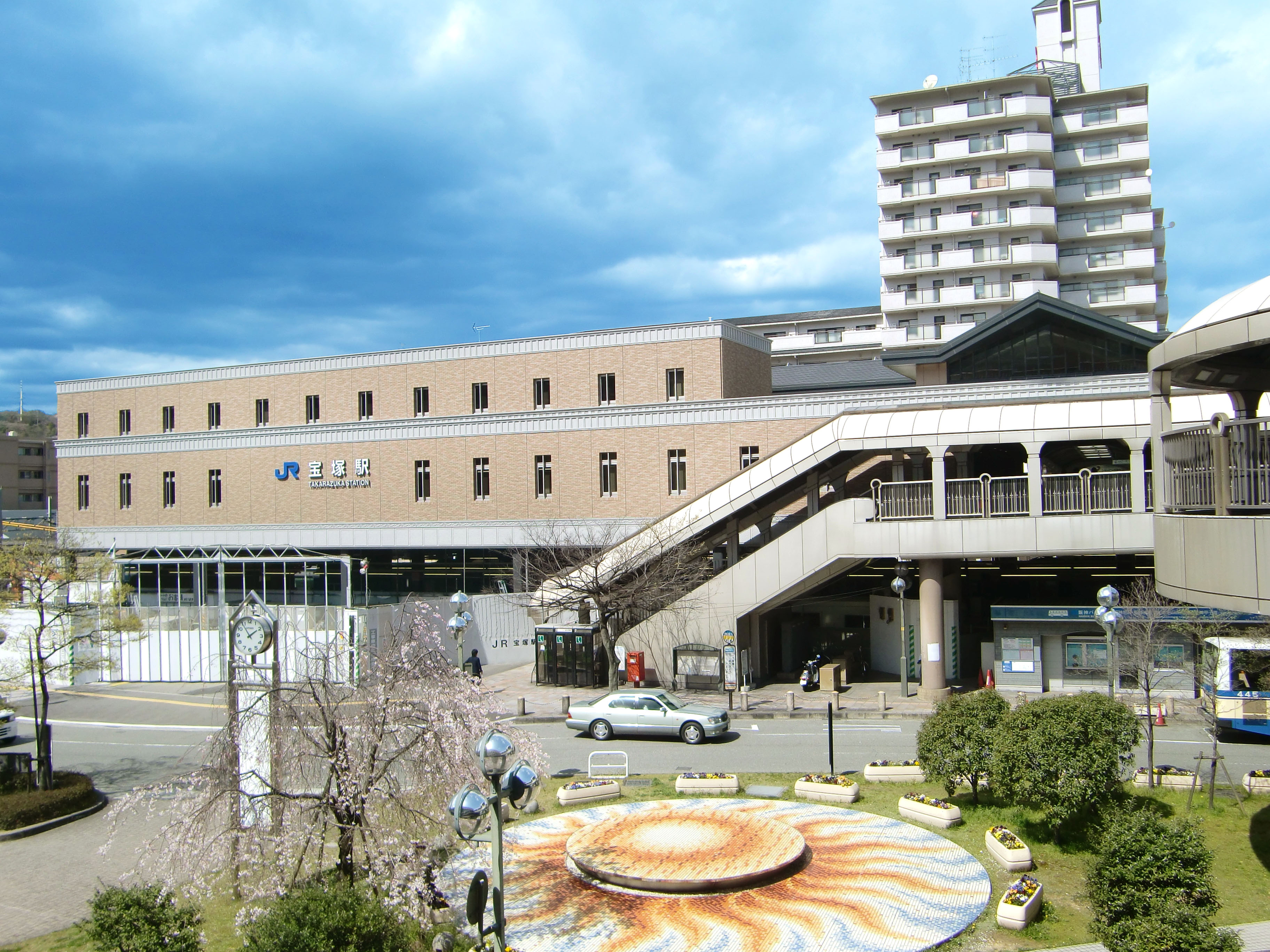
- JR Takarazuka Station

General information
- Location: 2-chōme-3 Sakaemachi, Takarazuka-shi, Hyōgo-ken 665-0845; Japan
- Coordinates: 34°48′41″N 135°20′26″E
- Operator: West Japan Railway Company; Hankyu Railway
- Connections: Bus terminal
Location
- Location within Hyōgo Prefecture Location within Japan

Takarazuka Station (宝塚駅, Takarazuka-eki) refers to either of the following two adjoining train stations in Takarazuka, Japan, one operated by West Japan Railway Company, the other by Hankyu Railway.

== West Japan Railway Company ==
Takarazuka Station 宝塚駅
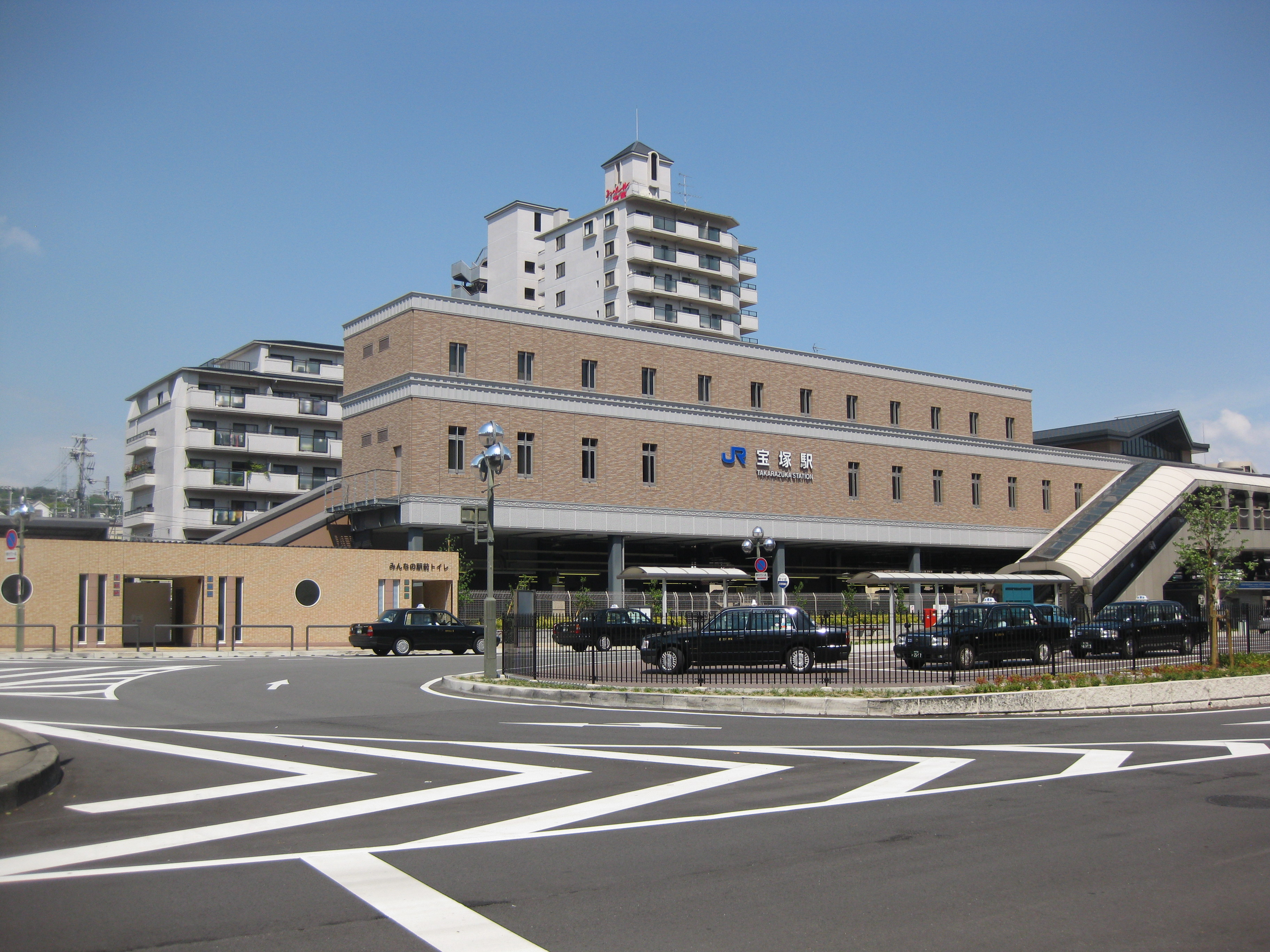
- JR Takarazuka Station

General information
- System: JR West station
- Operator: West Japan Railway Company
- Lines: Fukuchiyama Line (JR Takarazuka Line)

Construction
- Structure type: Ground level
- Accessible: Yes

Other information
- Status: Staffed (Midori no Madoguchi )
- Station code: JR-G56
- Website: Official website

History
- Opened: 27 December 1897

Passengers
- FY2019: 29,710 daily
Location

=== Lines ===
Takarazuka Station operated by West Japan Railway Company is on the Fukuchiyama Line between Osaka and Fukuchiyama. All serving trains stop at the station as the core station of the Fukuchiyama Line, shown in the common name JR Takarazuka Line (Osaka - Sasayamaguchi).

=== Layout ===
The station has a side platform and an island platform on the ground, connected by an elevated station building.The station has a Midori no Madoguchi staffed ticket office.

| 1 | ■ JR Takarazuka Line | for Sanda and Sasayamaguchi; Limited Express "Kounotori" for Fukuchiyama, Toyooka and Kinosaki Onsen |
| 2 | ■ JR Takarazuka Line | for Amagasaki, Osaka and Kitashinchi (siding, returning) |
| 3 | ■ JR Takarazuka Line | for Amagasaki, Osaka, Shin-Ōsaka and Kitashinchi |

=== Adjacent stations ===
| « | Service | » |
Fukuchiyama Line (JR Takarazuka Line)
| Nakayamadera | Local trains | Namaze |
| Nakayamadera | Regional Rapid Service | Namaze |
| Nakayamadera | Rapid Service | Nishinomiyanajio |
| Nakayamadera | Tambaji Rapid Service | Nishinomiyanajio |
| Amagasaki | Limited Express "Konotori" | Sanda |

=== History ===
JR Takarazuka Station opened on 27 December 1897. With the privatization of the Japan National Railways (JNR) on 1 April 1987, the station came under the aegis of the West Japan Railway Company.

Station numbering was introduced in March 2018 with JR Takarazuka being assigned station number JR-G56.

=== Gallery ===
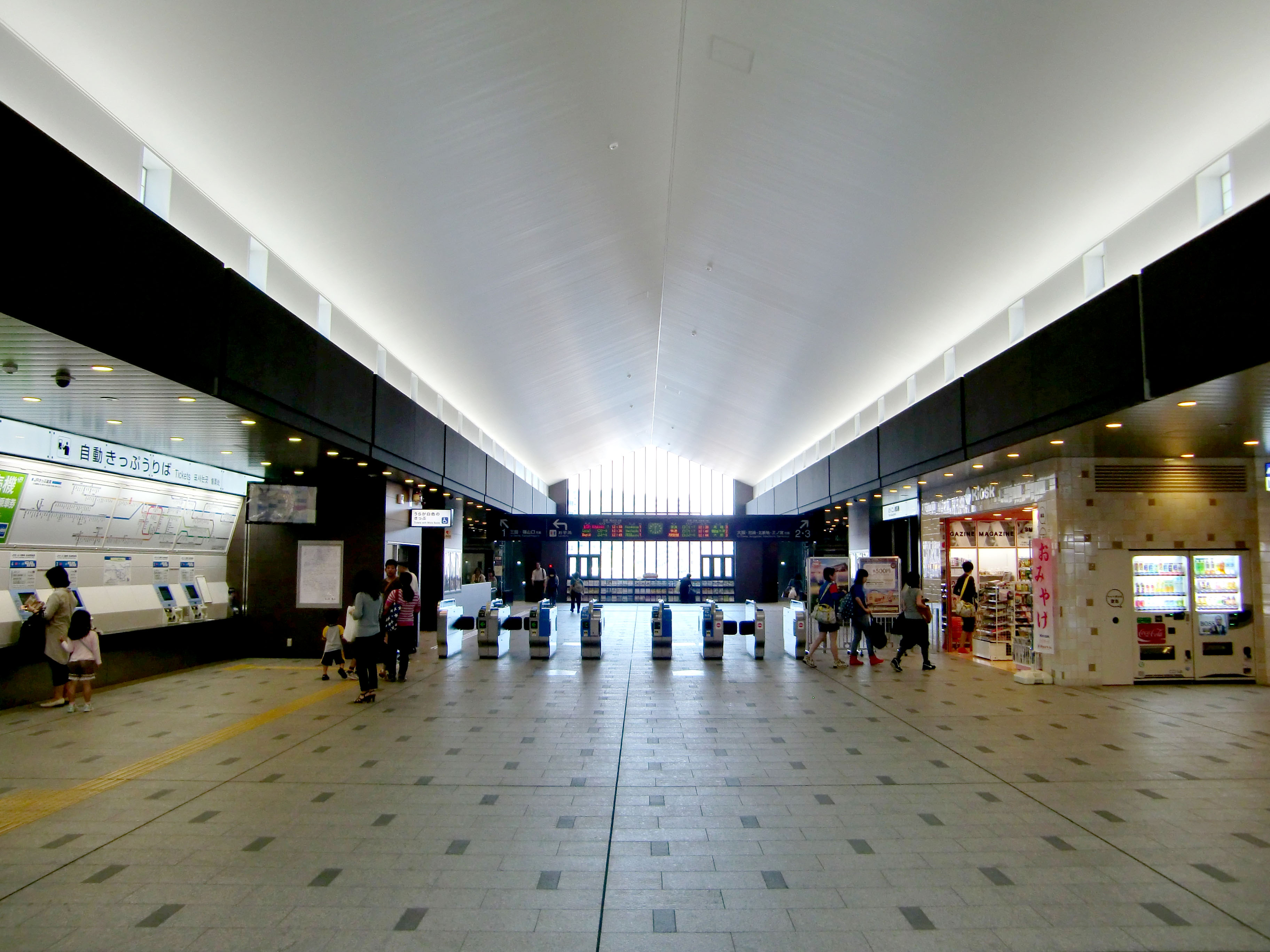
Station Ticket Gate

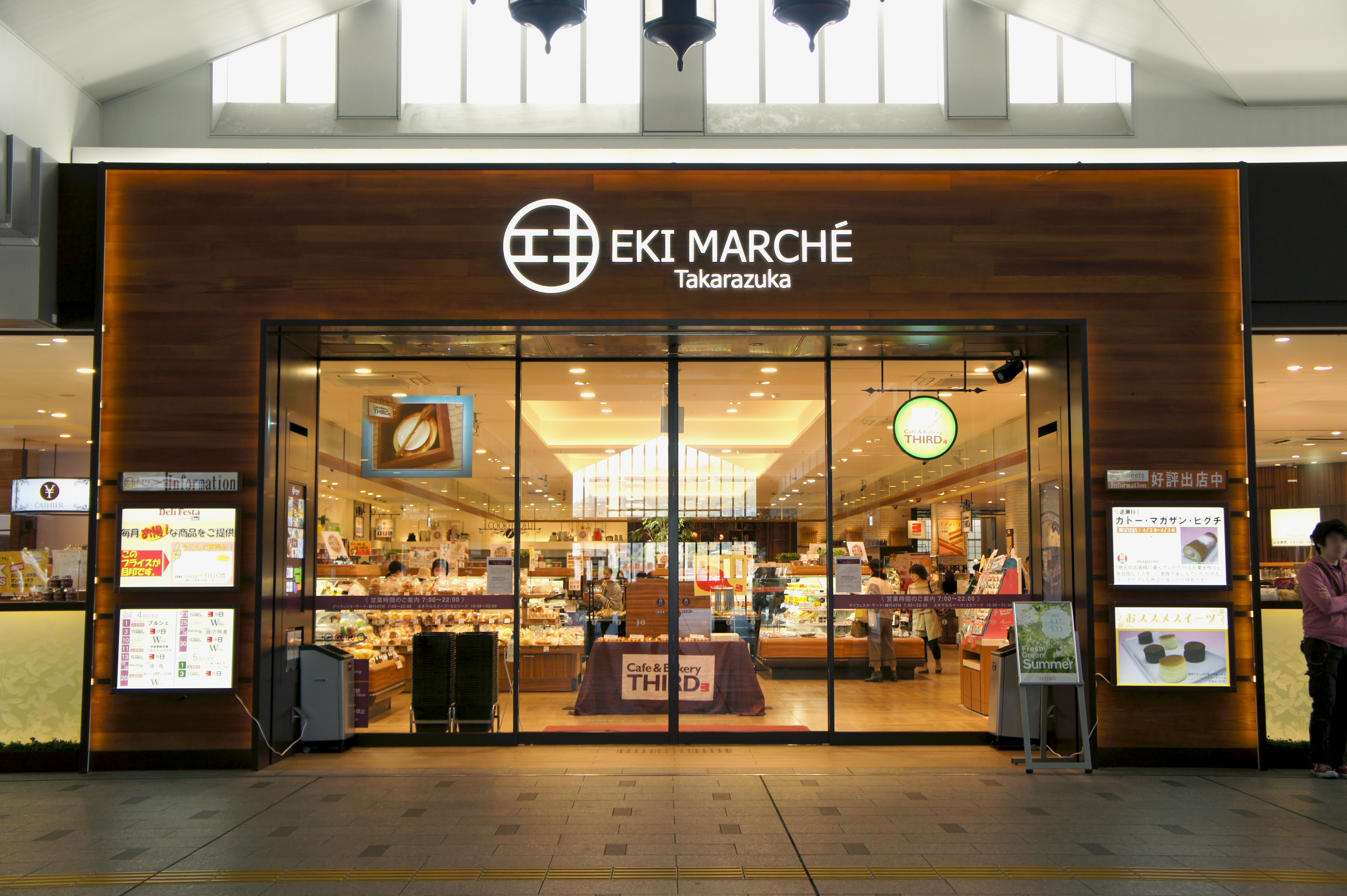
Eki Marché Takarazuka

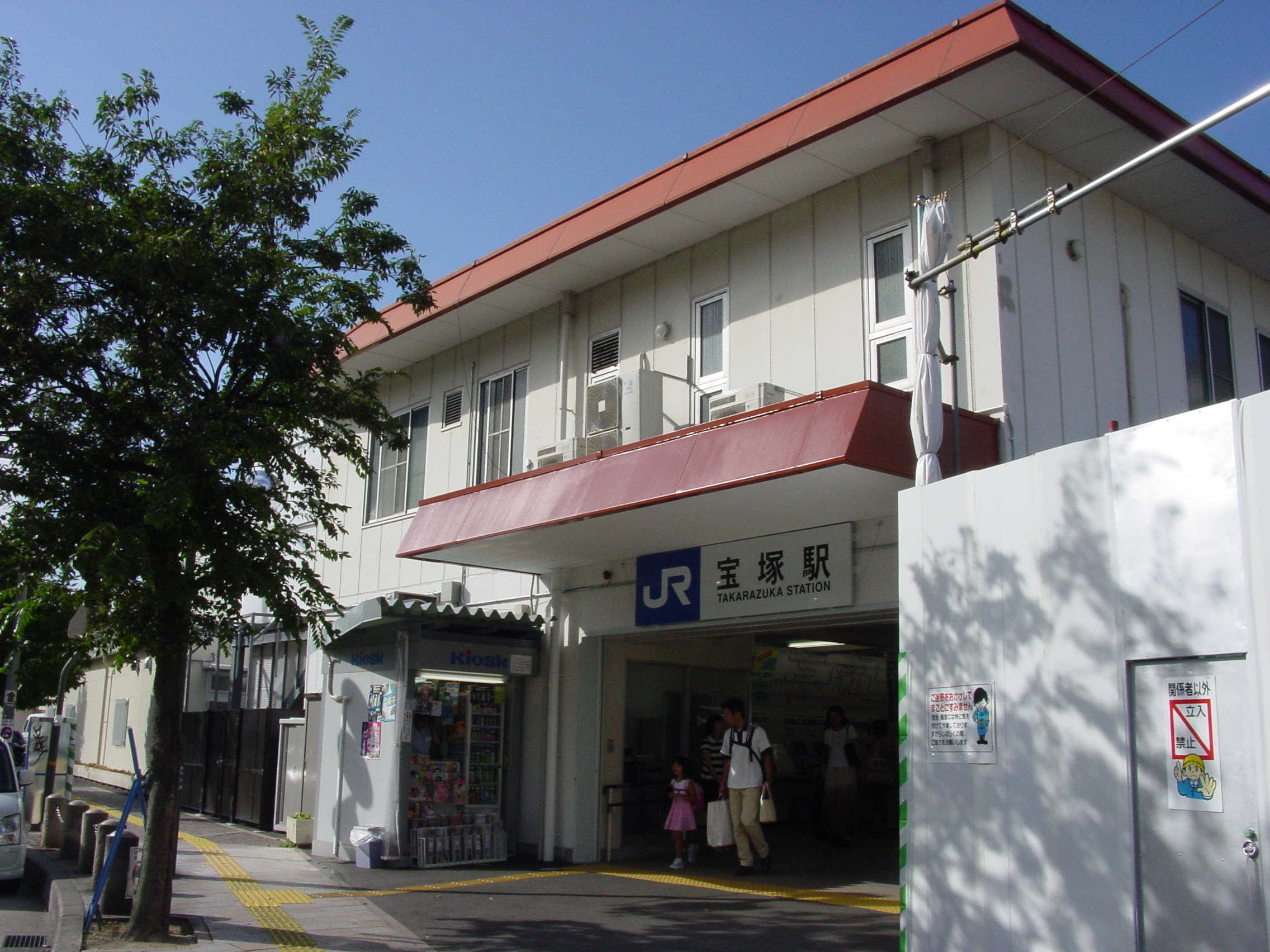
Entrance (during station remodeling)

== Hankyu Railway ==
Takarazuka Station 宝塚駅
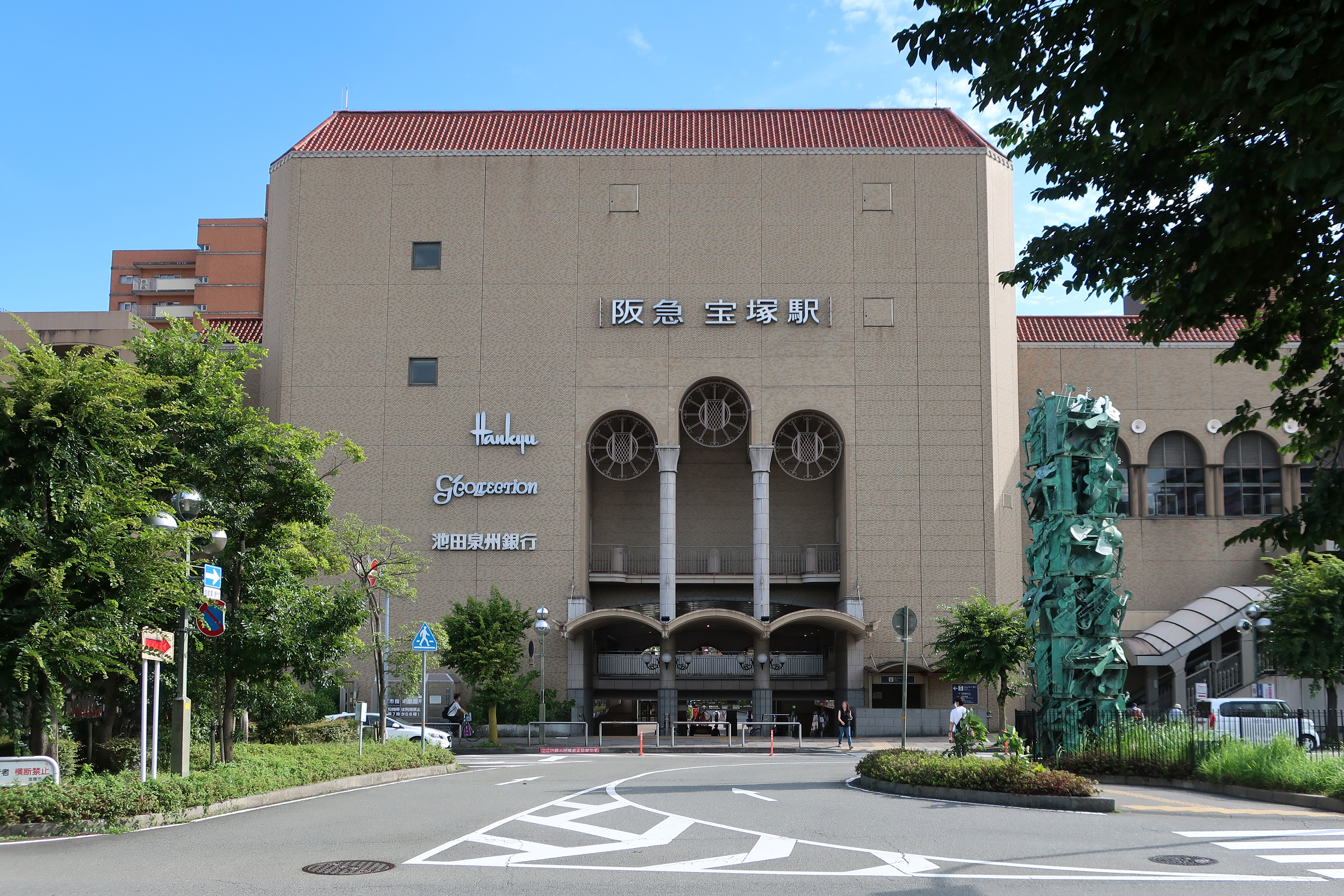
- Station building

General information
- Other names: Takarazuka Grand Theater (宝塚大劇場前)
- Location: 3-1 Sakaemachi, Takarazuka-shi, Hyōgo-ken 665-0845; Japan
- System: Hankyu Railway station
- Operator: Hankyu Railway
- Lines: ■ Takarazuka Main Line; ■ Imazu Line

Other information
- Station code: HK-56
- Website: Official website

History
- Opened: March 10, 1910

Passengers
- FY2019: 48,894 daily

Services
| Preceding station | Hankyu Railway | Following station |
|---|---|---|
| Kiyoshikōjin towards Osaka-umeda | Takarazuka Main Line Local Semi-Express Express | Terminus |
| Takarazuka-minamiguchi towards Nishinomiya-Kitaguchi | Imazu Line North section Local Semi-Express Togetsu | Terminus |
Location

=== Lines ===
Hankyu Takarazuka Station operated by Hankyu Railway is the northern terminus of both the Hankyu Takarazuka Line and Hankyu Imazu Line.

=== Layout ===
The Hankyu station has two elevated bay platforms serving two tracks each.

| 1, 2 | ■ not in use | |
| 3 | ■ Imazu Line | for Nigawa, Nishinomiya-Kitaguchi, Kōbe and Imazu |
| 4 | ■ Takarazuka Line | for Kiyoshikōjin, Nakayama-kannon, Kawanishi-Noseguchi, Ōsaka (Umeda), Minoo, and Kyōto |

Track layout
| ← for Nishinomiya-Kitaguchi |
| | ↓for Kawanishi-Noseguchi and Osaka-umeda |

=== History ===
The Hankyu station opened on March 10, 1910.

=== Gallery ===
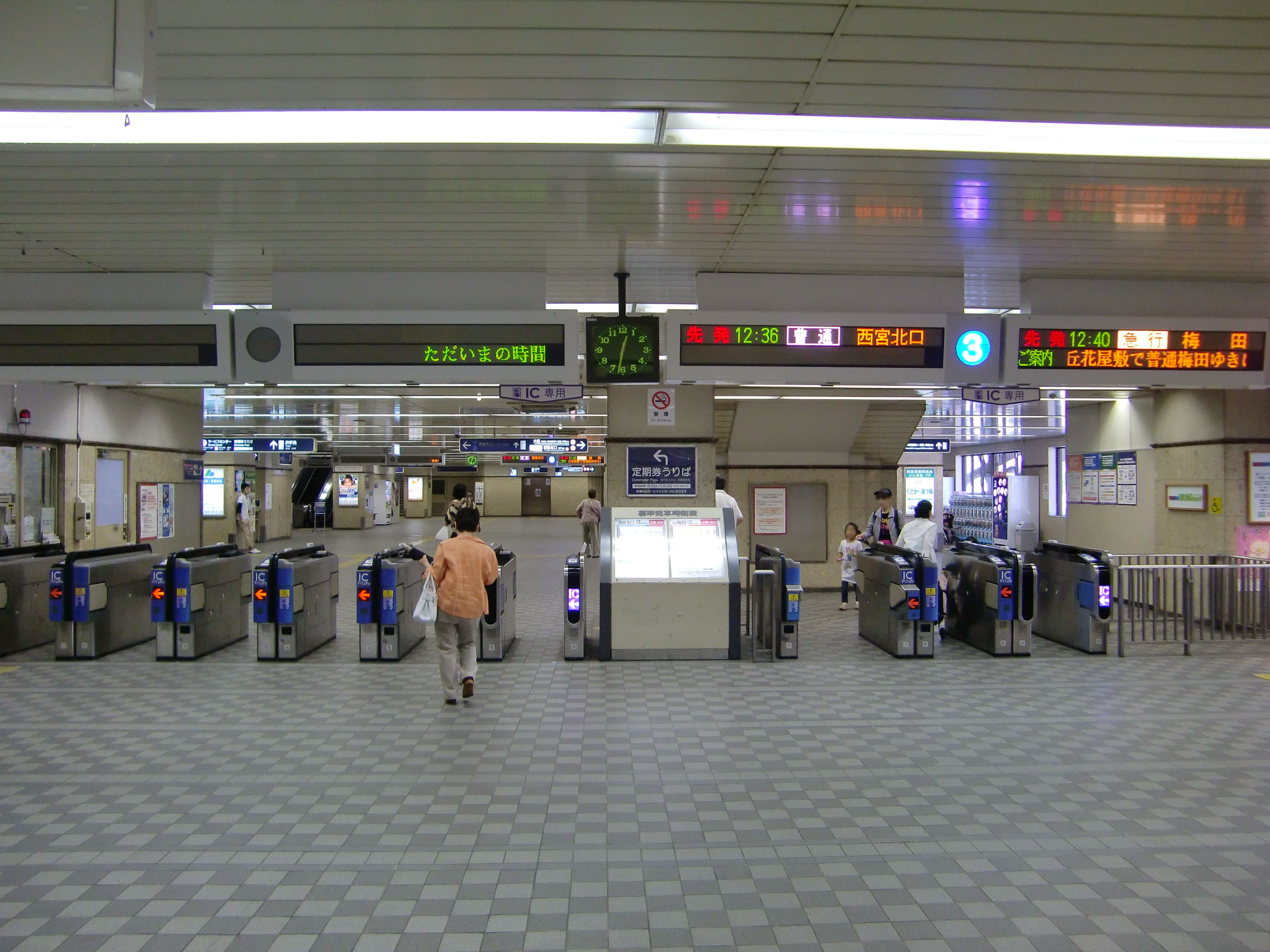
Station Ticket Gate

== Surrounding area ==
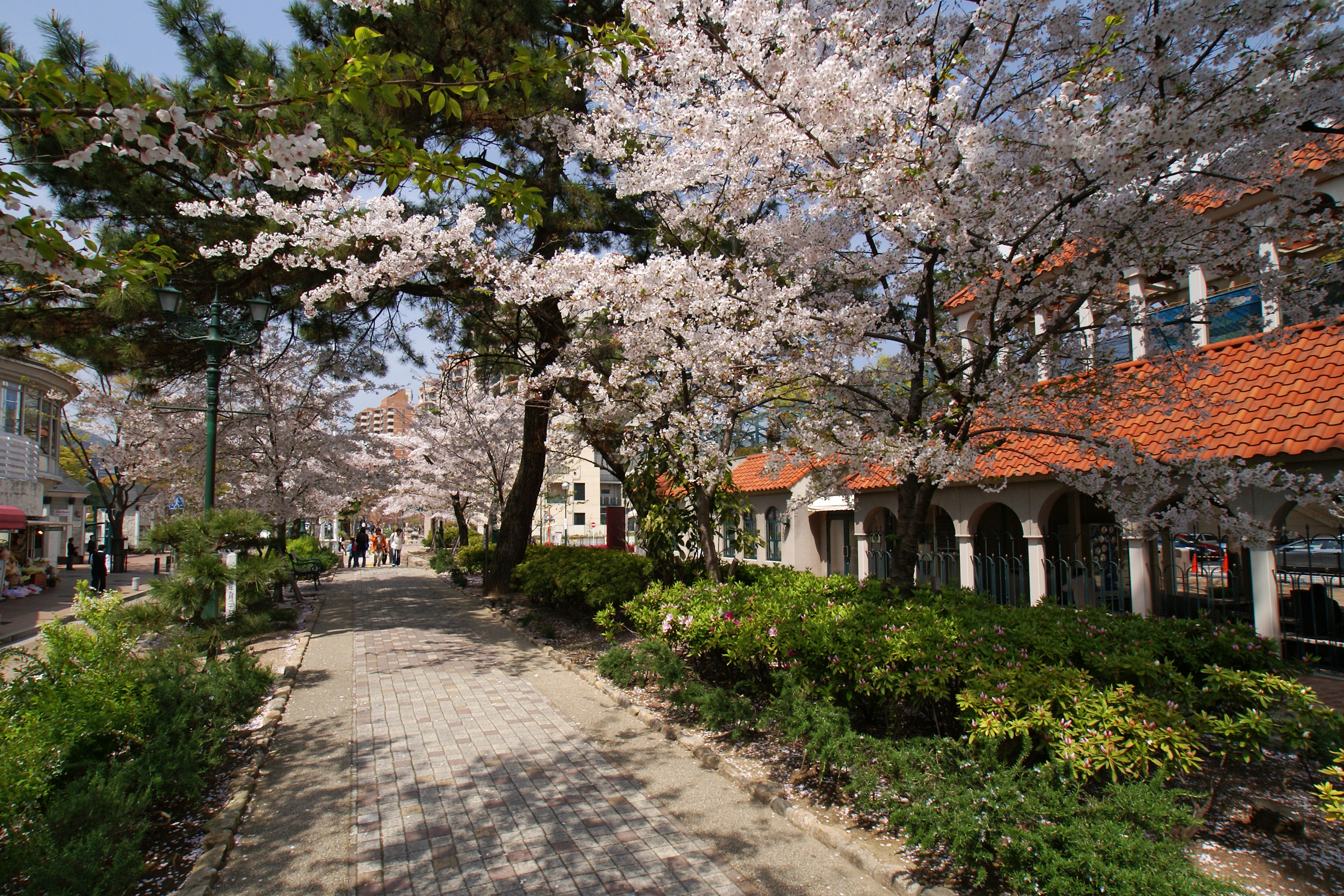
Hana-no-michi (flower path) street in Takarazuka

- Sorio Takarazuka
  - Hankyu Department Store
  - Sumitomo Mitsui Banking Corporation
  - Sorio Hall
- Bus stops (Hankyu Bus Co., Hankyu Denen Bus Co., Hanshin Bus Co.)
- Takarazuka Onsen
- Hana no michi
- Takarazuka Grand Theater, Takarazuka Bow Hall
- Takarazuka Music School
- The Osamu Tezuka Manga Museum
- Takarazuka Garden Fields
- Japan National Route 176
- Mukogawa River

== Passenger statistics ==
In fiscal 2019, the JR station was used by an average of 29,710 passengers daily. During the same period, the Hankyu station was used by 48,894 passengers daily.

== See also ==
- List of railway stations in Japan
