= Hankyu 6000 series =

Japanese train type

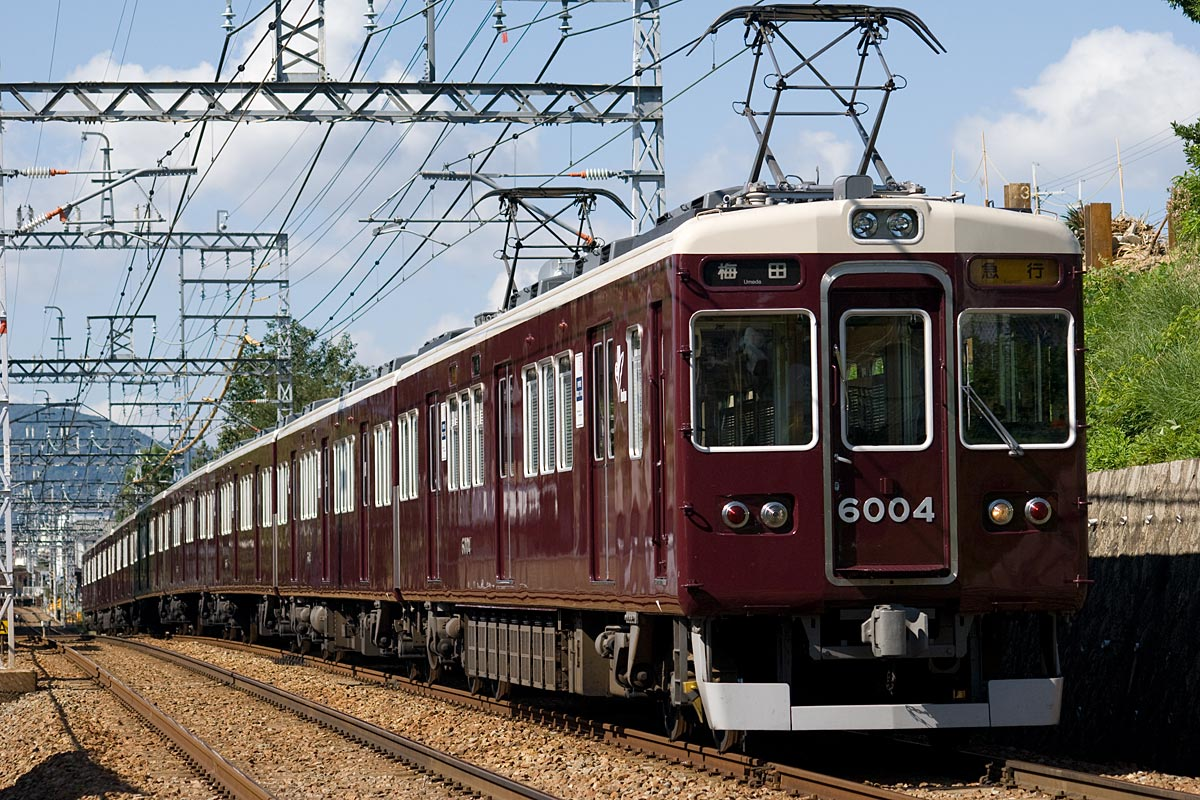
- A 6000 series set on a express service, October 2007
- In service: 1976–
- Manufacturer: Alna Kōki
- Refurbished: 2001
- Number built: 140 vehicles
- Number in service: 125 vehicles (Hankyu Railway); 8 vehicles (Nose Electric Railway)
- Number scrapped: 7 vehicles
- Formation: 2/3/4/8 cars per trainset
- Operators: Hankyu Railway; Nose Electric Railway
- Depots: Hirai, Nishinomiya
- Lines served: Hankyu Kobe Main Line; Hankyu Kobe Kosoku Line; Hankyu Itami Line; Hankyu Imazu Line; Hankyu Kōyō Line; Hankyū Takarazuka Main Line; Hankyu Minoo Line; Nose Railway Myōken Line; Nose Railway Nissei Line

Specifications
- Car body construction: Steel; Aluminium alloy (Set 6000)
- Car length: 19,000 mm (62 ft 4 in)
- Width: 2,750 mm (9 ft 0 in)
- Height: 4,095 mm (13 ft 5.2 in)
- Doors: 3 pairs per side
- Maximum speed: 110 km/h (70 mph)
- Traction system: Resistor control
- Power output: 140 kW (190 hp) per motor
- Acceleration: 2.8 km/(h⋅s) (1.7 mph/s)
- Electric system(s): 1,500 V DC overhead catenary
- Current collection: Pantograph
- Bogies: FS-369A, FS-069A
- Braking system(s): Dynamic brake Electronically controlled pneumatic brakes
- Safety system(s): ATS
- Coupling system: Shibata-type; Knuckle-type
- Multiple working: 7000 series, 8000 series, 8200 series, 9000 series
- Track gauge: 1,435 mm (4 ft 8 1/2 in)

The Hankyu 6000 series (阪急電鉄6000系) is an electric multiple unit (EMU) train type operated in Japan by the private railway operator Hankyu since 1976.

== Formations ==
=== 8-car sets ===
Car No.	1	2	3	4	5	6	7	8
Designation	Mc	M'	T	T	T	T	M	M'c
Numbering	6000	6500	6550	6550	6550	6550	6600	6100

=== 8-car mixed 6000/7000 series sets ===
Car No.	1	2	3	4	5	6	7	8
Designation	Tc	M	M'	T	T	M	M'	Tc
Numbering	6050	7600	7500	7550	7550	7600	7500	6150
Designation	Mc	M'	T	T	T	T	M	M'c
Numbering	7000	7500	6550	7550	7550	6550	7600	7100

=== 4-car sets ===
Car No.	1	2	3	4
Designation	Mc	M'	T	Tc
Numbering	6000	6500	6550	6150

=== 3+3-car sets ===
Car No.	1	2	3	4	5	6
Designation	Mc	T	M'c	Mc	T	M'c
Numbering	6000	6550	6100	6000	6550	6100

=== 3-car sets ===
Car No.	1	2	3
Designation	Mc	T	M'c
Numbering	6000	6550	6100

=== 2-car sets ===
Car No.	1	2
Designation	Mc	M'c
Numbering	6000	6100

== Resale ==
Eight-car set 6002 was transferred to the Nose Electric Railway in 2014.

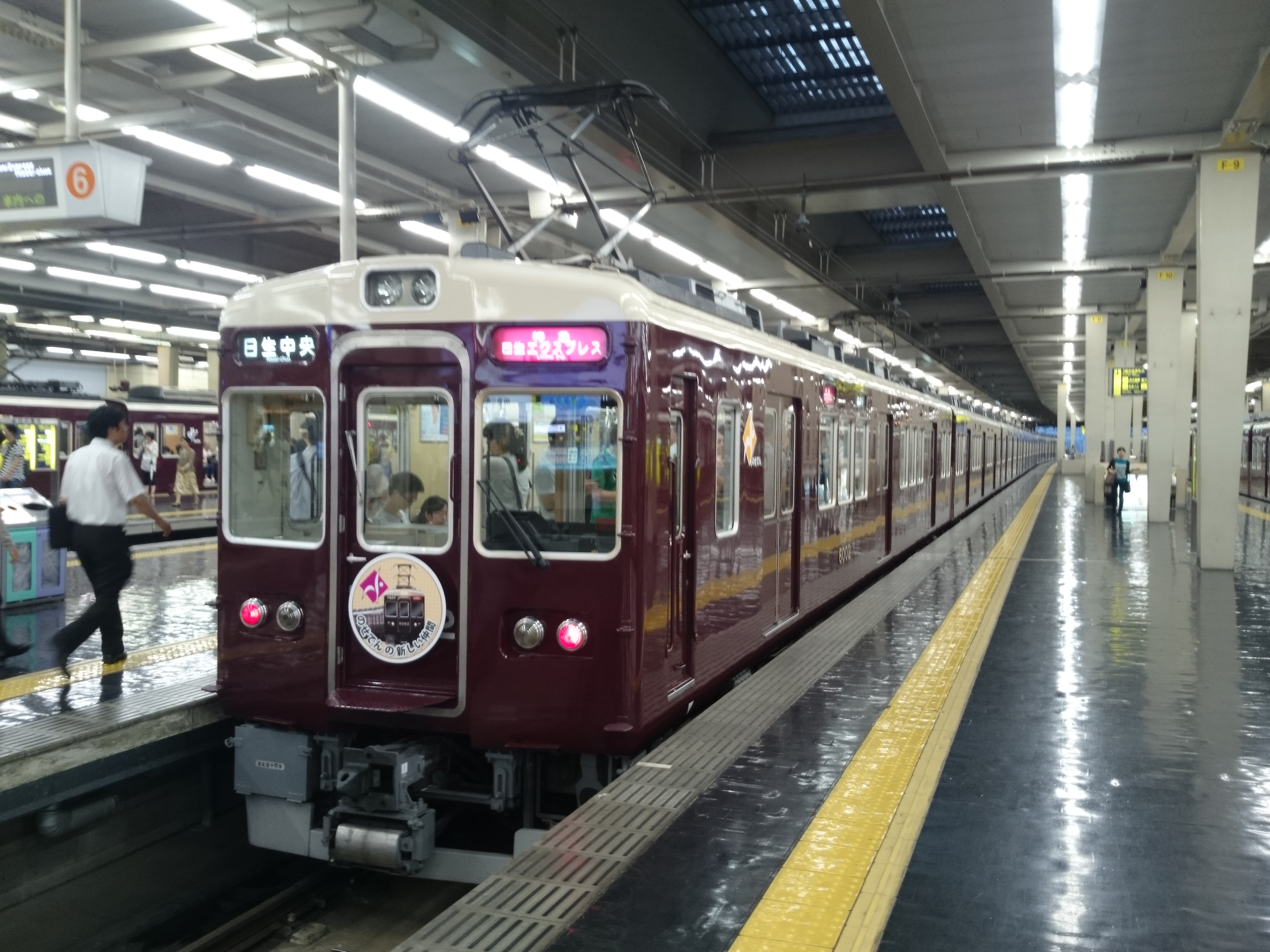
Nose Electric Railway 6000 series set 6002, August 2014
