= Kanzakigawa Station =

Railway station in Osaka, Japan

Coordinates: 34.7320°N 135.4730°E

Kanzakigawa Station 神崎川駅
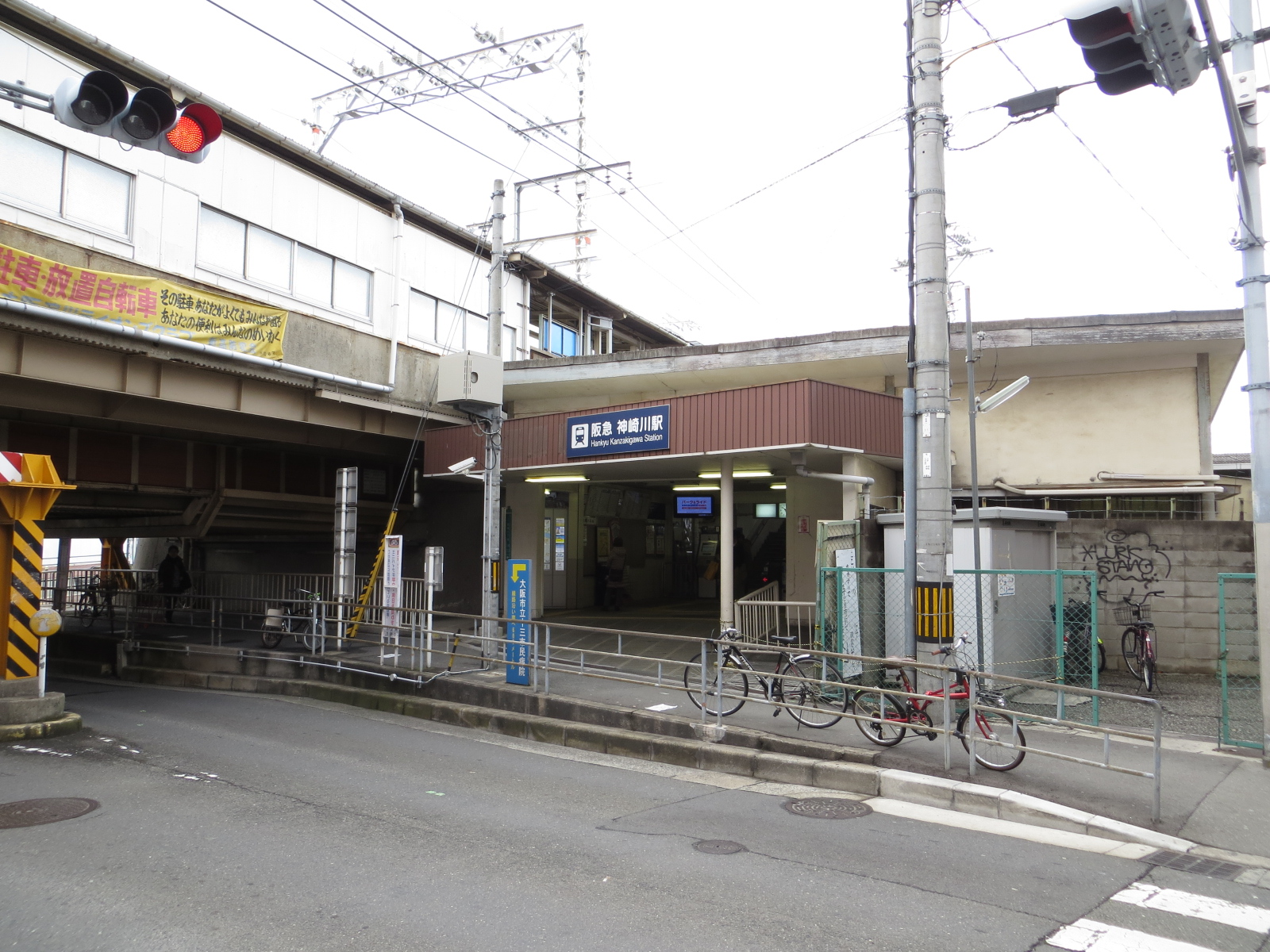
- Station building, February 2014

General information
- Location: Yodogawa-ku, Osaka; Japan
- Operator: Hankyu
- Line: Hankyu Kobe Main Line
- Platforms: 2 - Side platforms
- Tracks: 2

Other information
- Station code: HK-04

History
- Opened: 16 July 1920

Services
Preceding station	Hankyu Railway	Following station
Jūsō HK-03 towards Osaka-umeda	Kōbe Main Line Local	Sonoda HK-05 towards Kobe-Sannomiya
Location

Kanzakigawa Station (神崎川駅, Kanzakigawa-eki) is a train station in Yodogawa-ku, Osaka, Osaka Prefecture, Japan.

== Layout ==
Kanzakigawa is aground level station. It is served by two side platforms serving two tracks.

1	■ Kobe Line	for Kobe-sannomiya, Shinkaichi and Sanyo Electric Railway
2	■ Kobe Line	for Osaka (Umeda), Kyoto and Takarazuka

== History ==
The station opened on 16 July 1920, simultaneously with the opening of the Kobe Main Line.

Station numbering was introduced on 21 December 2013, with Kanzakigawa being designated as station number HK-04.
