= Sonoda Station =

Railway station in Amagasaki, Hyōgo Prefecture, Japan

Sonoda Station 園田駅
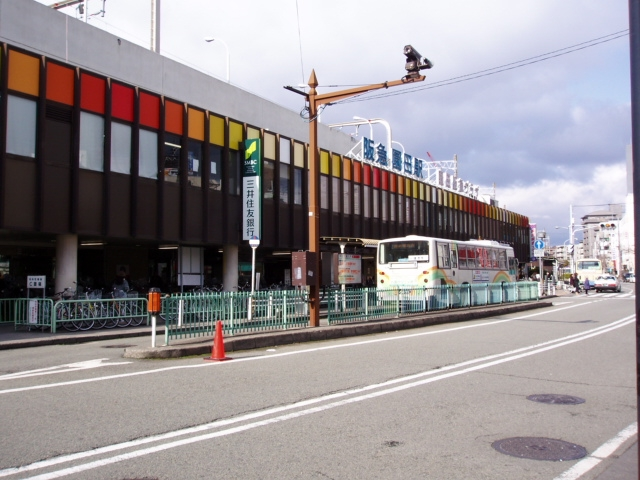
- Sonoda Station building (north side)

General information
- Location: Higashi-Sonodacho, Amagasaki-shi, Hyōgo-ken 661-0953; Japan
- Coordinates: 34°45′7.22″N 135°26′53.55″E
- Operator: Hankyu Railway
- Line: Kōbe Main Line
- Distance: 7.2 km (4.5 miles) from Osaka-umeda
- Platforms: 2 side platforms
- Tracks: 4

Other information
- Status: Staffed
- Station code: HK-05
- Website: Official website

History
- Opened: 20 October 1936

Passengers
- FY2020: 38,241

Services
Preceding station	Hankyu Railway	Following station
Kanzakigawa towards Osaka-umeda	Kōbe Main Line Local	Tsukaguchi towards Kobe-Sannomiya
Location
- Location within Hyōgo Prefecture Location within Japan

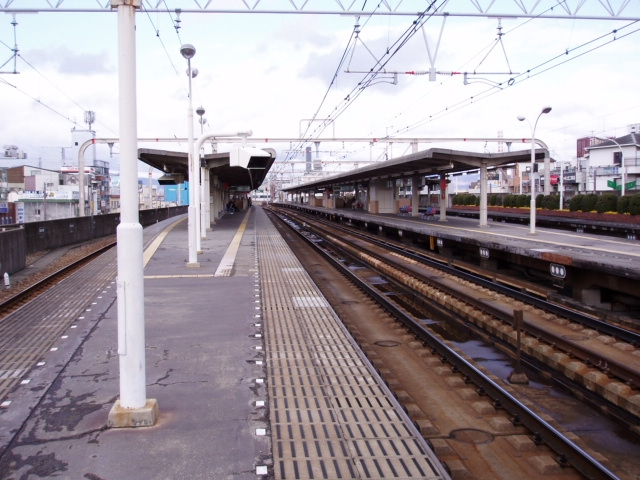
Tracks and platforms

Sonoda station (園田駅, Sonoda-ekii; station number: HK-05) is a passenger railway station located in the city of Amagasaki Hyōgo Prefecture, Japan. It is operated by the private transportation company Hankyu Railway. Although technically situated in Amagasaki, it is a five-minute walk to neighboring Osaka Prefecture.

== Lines ==
Sonoda Station is served by the Hankyu Kobe Line, and is located 7.2 kilometres (4.5 miles) from the terminus of the line at Osaka-umeda.

== Layout ==
The station consists of two elevated island platforms serving four tracks and a single unnumbered side platform outside the inbound siding track. Normally, only the island platform is used, and the single platform is a 'temporary platform' for getting off, which was mainly used when the Sonoda horse race is held.

=== Platforms ===
1, 2	■ Kobe Line	for Nishinomiya-Kitaguchi, Kōbe (Kobe-Sannomiya, Shinkaichi) and Takarazuka
3, 4	■ Kobe Line	for Ōsaka (Umeda), Kyōto, Kita-Senri and Minoo
x	■ Kobe Line	Used for getting off the local trains from Nishinomiya-Kitaguchi when horse racing is held

== History ==
Sonoda Station opened on 20 October 1936.

The station was transformed from a surface-level station to an elevated station in 1980. Work took 2 years to complete.

Station numbering was introduced on 21 December 2013, with Sonoda being designated as station number HK-05.

== Passenger statistics ==
In fiscal year 2019, the station was used by an average of 38,241 passengers daily.

== Surrounding area ==
Below the station itself exists a small shopping centre called Sonoda Hankyu Plaza (園田阪急プラザ) which undertook a major renovation completed at the end of April 2006. It now consists of many restaurants, a Matsumoto Kiyoshi pharmacy, a Mister Donut, a branch of the Kohyo chain of supermarket, a Docomo mobile phone shop as well as various smaller retailers.

- Sonoda Racecourse
- Yuri Gakuin Junior and Senior High School
- Amagasaki Municipal Sonoda Higashi Junior High School

== See also ==
- List of railway stations in Japan
