= Hankyu 5000 series =

Japanese train type

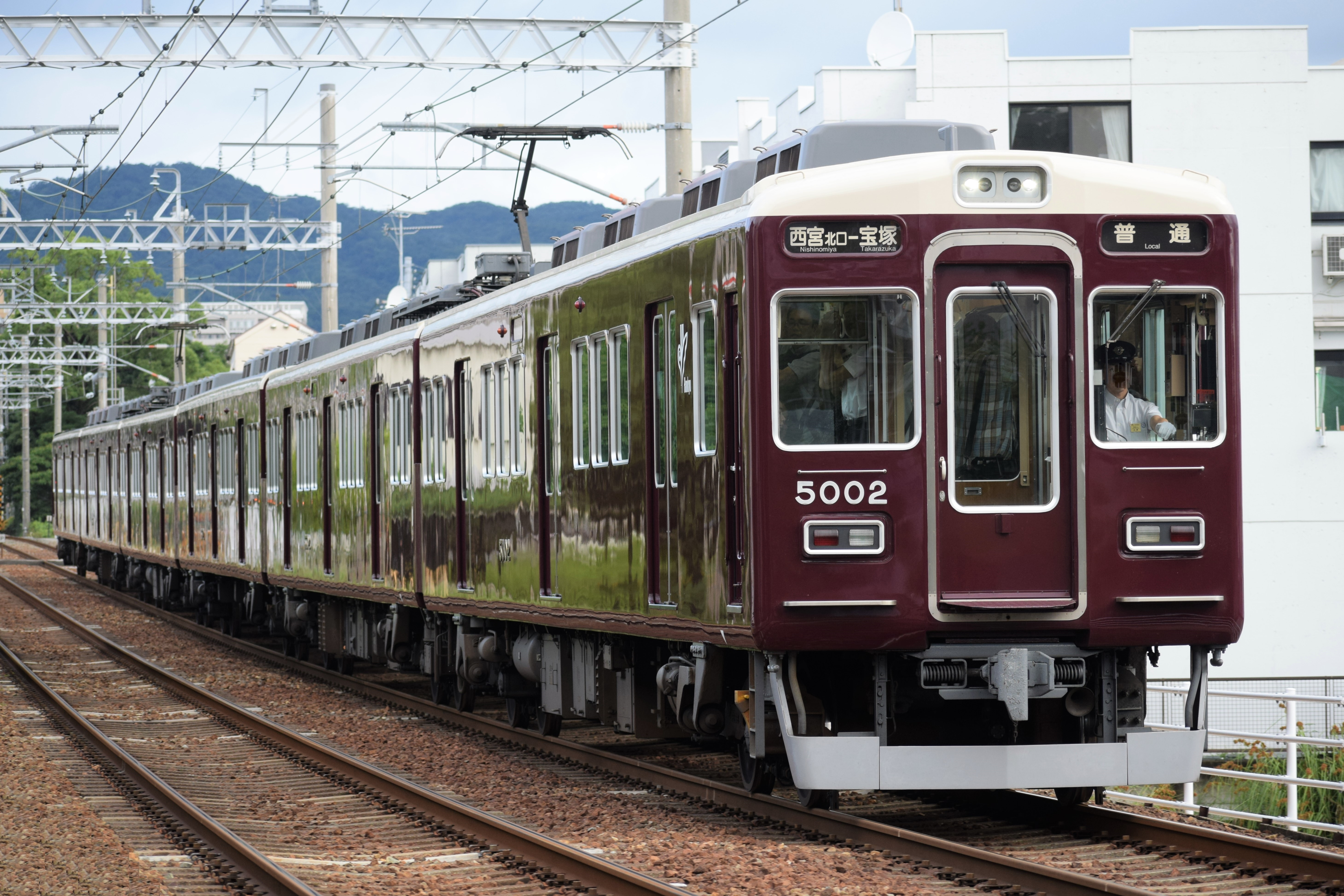
- 5000 series on the Imazu Line
- In service: 1967
- Manufacturer: Naniwa Kōki
- Number built: 47 cars
- Formation: 6 (formerly 8) cars per trainset
- Operator: Hankyu Corporation
- Lines served: Hankyu Kobe Main Line (1967–2020); Hankyu Imazu Line (2016–)

Specifications
- Electric systems: 1,500 V DC overhead catenary
- Current collection: Pantograph
- UIC classification: Bo'Bo'+Bo'Bo'+2'2'+Bo'Bo'+Bo'Bo'+2'2'

The Hankyu 5000 series (阪急電鉄5000系, Hankyū dentetsu 5000-kei) is an electric multiple unit (EMU) train type operated in Japan by the private railway operator Hankyu Railway since 1967. It is mainly operated on the Imazu Line. In the past, it was also operated on the Kobe Main Line.

== History ==
The 5000 series were introduced in 1967 for direct operation onto the Sanyo Electric Railway via the newly-opened Kobe Rapid Railway Tozai Line. Sets were manufactured by Naniwa Koki, which would later become Alna Koki.

Trains were converted from 8-car sets to 6-car sets through 2020.

== Formations ==
Sets are formed as follows:

Car No.	1	2	3	4	5	6
Designation	M'c	M	T	M'	M	Tc
Numbering	5000	5500	5550	5520	5500	5050
