= Hankyu 9000 series =

Japanese train type

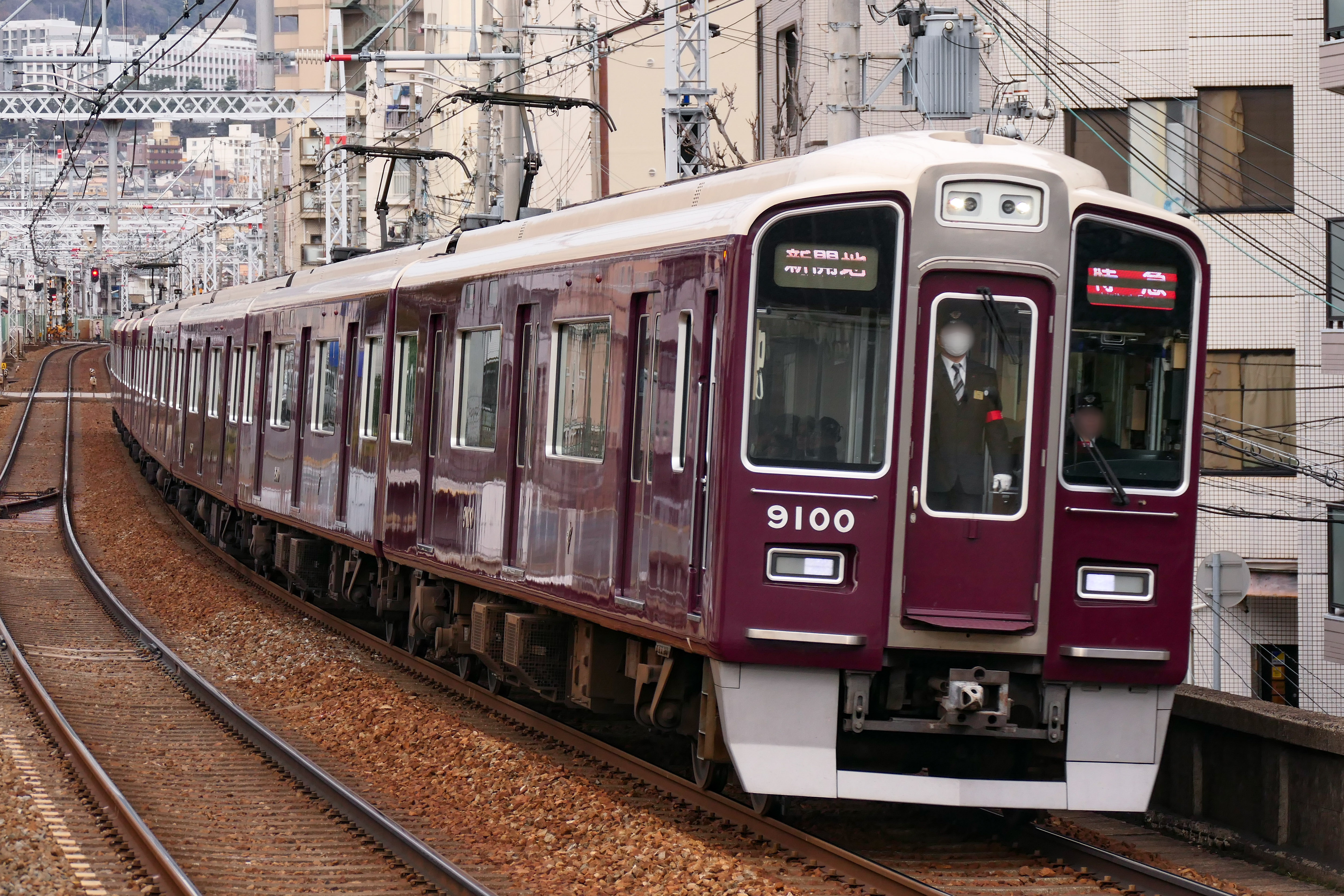
- A 9000 series set on a limited express service, January 2020
- In service: 2006–present
- Manufacturer: Hitachi, Alna Sharyo
- Family name: Hitachi A-train
- Replaced: 3000 series
- Number built: 88 vehicles (11 sets)
- Number in service: 88 vehicles (11 sets)
- Formation: 8 cars per trainset
- Fleet numbers: 9000–
- Operators: Hankyu Railway
- Depots: Hirai, Nishinomiya
- Lines served: Hankyu Kobe Main Line; Hankyu Kobe Kosoku Line; Hankyu Takarazuka Main Line; Hankyu Minoo Line

Specifications
- Car body construction: Aluminium alloy, double-skin
- Car length: 19,000 mm (62 ft 4 in)
- Width: 2,750 mm (9 ft 0 in)
- Height: 4,095 mm (13 ft 5.2 in)
- Doors: 3 pairs per side
- Maximum speed: 115 km/h (71 mph)
- Traction system: Variable frequency (IGBT)
- Electric system(s): 1,500 V DC (overhead catenary)
- Current collector(s): Pantograph
- Bogies: FS-565 (motored); FS-065 (trailer)
- Braking system(s): Electronically controlled pneumatic brakes with regenerative braking
- Safety system(s): ATS
- Coupling system: Shibata-Type
- Multiple working: 7000 series, 8000 series, 8200 series
- Track gauge: 1,435 mm (4 ft 8 1/2 in)

The Hankyu 9000 series (阪急電鉄9000系) is an electric multiple unit (EMU) train type operated in Japan by the private railway operator Hankyu Railway since 2006.

== Design ==
The 9000 series uses double-skin aluminium alloy body construction. The type features a more angular front-end design than its predecessors, as well as covered radio and air conditioning equipment.

Passenger accommodation consists of longitudinal bench seating throughout with a seat width of 480 mm (19 in). To improve accessibility and level boarding, the 9000 series has a floor height of 1,150 mm (45 in), 20 mm (1 in) lower than that of previous trains. Pairs of LCD information displays are provided above each doorway.

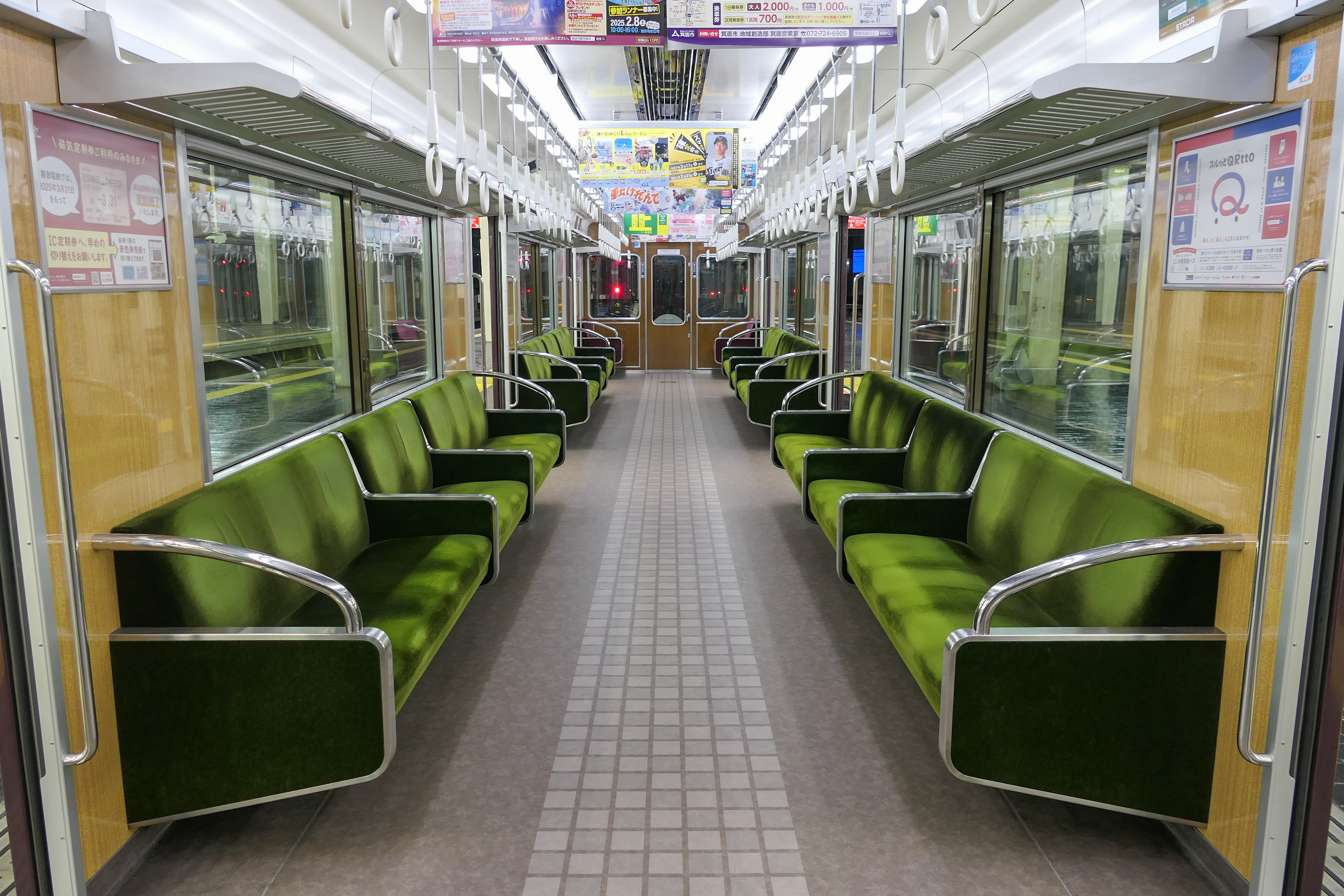
Interior

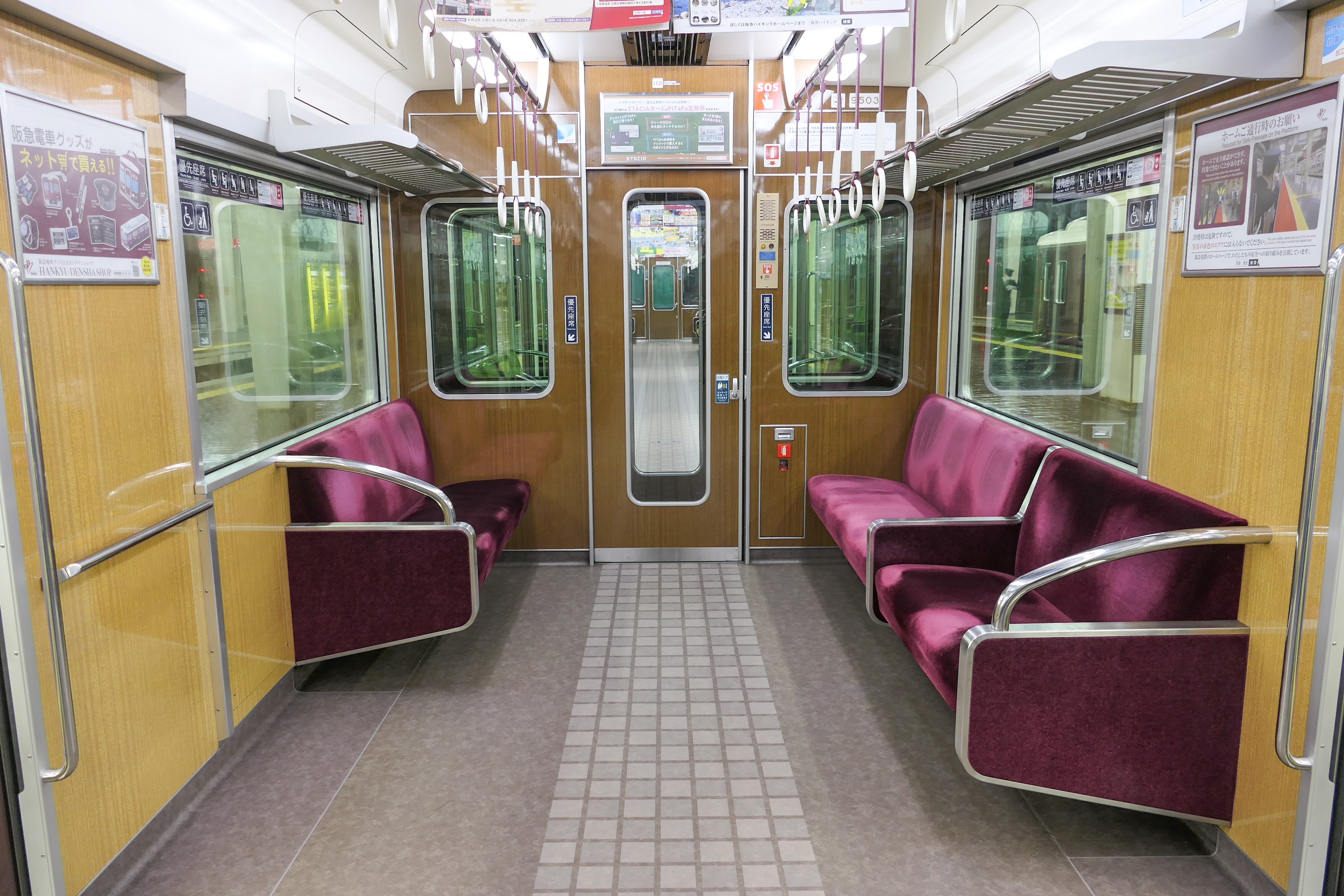
Priority seating

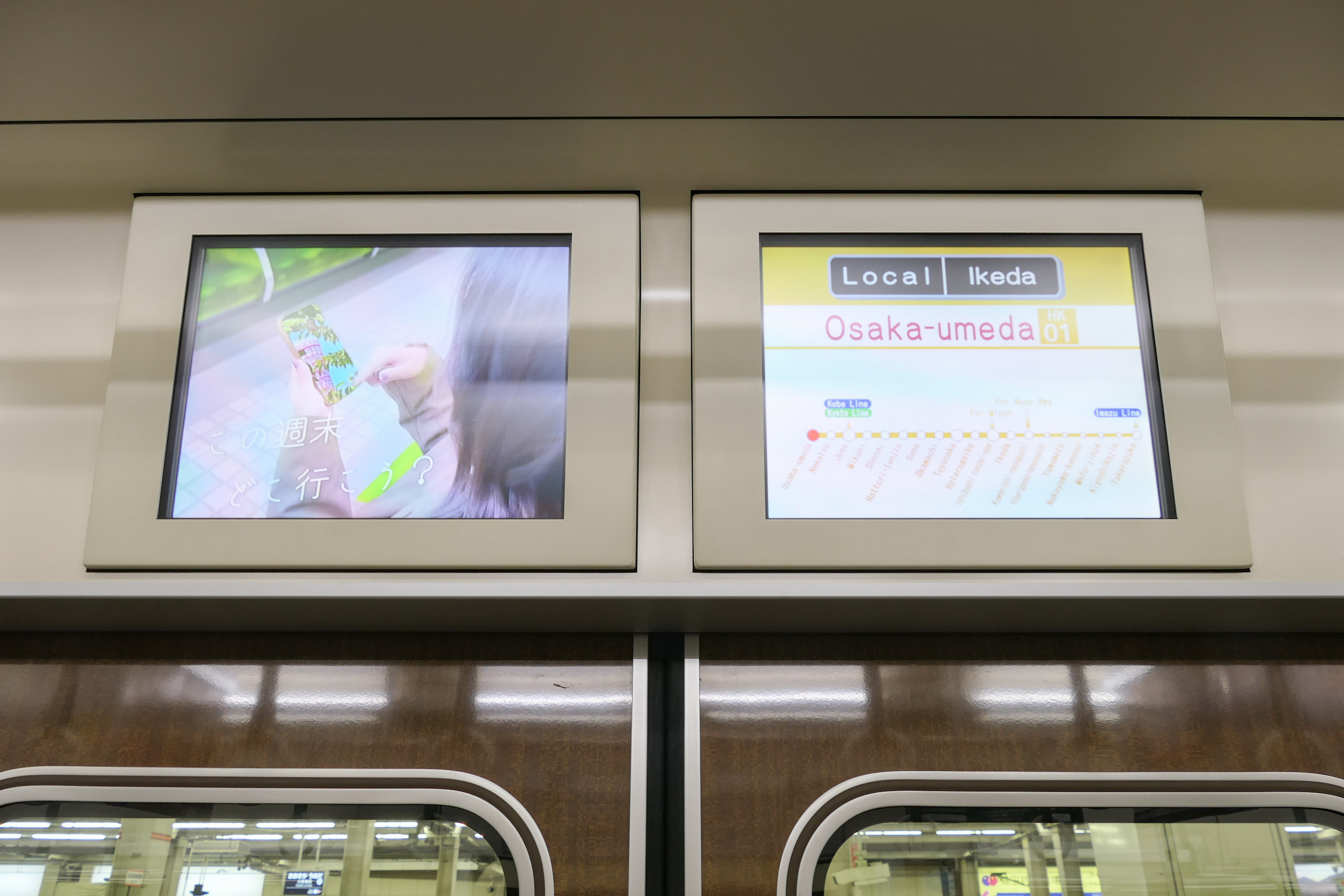
LCD information display

== Formations ==
As of 1 April 2013, the fleet consisted of eleven eight-car sets formed as follows, with three motored (M) cars and five non-powered trailer (T) cars.

Car No.	1	2	3	4	5	6	7	8
Designation	Mc1	T1	T2	T2	T2	T1	M1	Mc2
Numbering	9000	9550	9570	9580	9590	9560	9500	9100

The "Mc1" and "M1" cars are each fitted with two single-arm pantographs.

== History ==
The 9000 series entered revenue service on 31 July 2006.
