= Hankyū Kōbe Main Line =

Railway line in Japan

Kobe Main Line

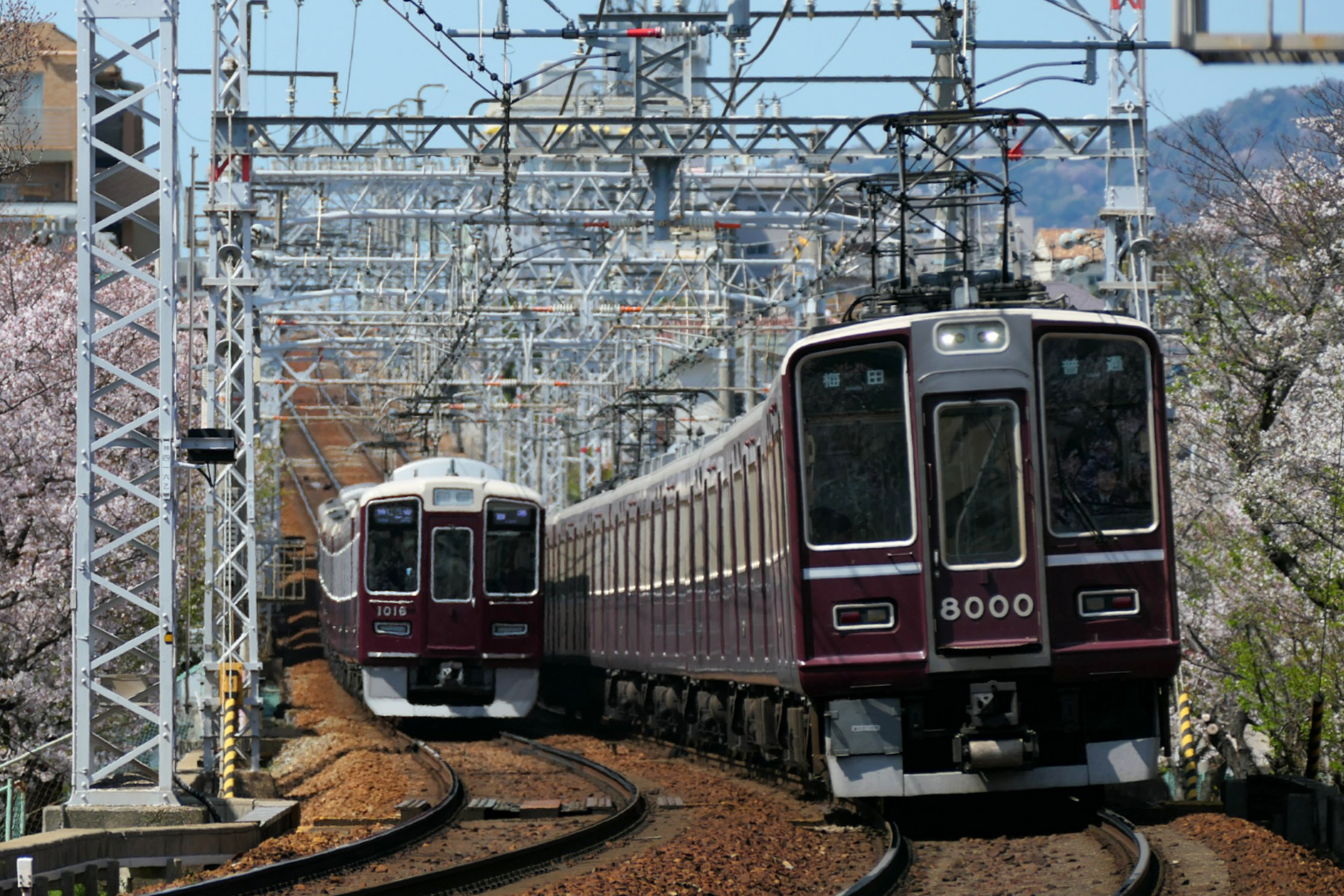
- Pair of EMUs between Mikage and Okamoto

Overview
- Native name: 神戸本線
- Status: In service
- Owner: Hankyu Corporation
- Line number: HK
- Locale: Kansai
- Termini: Osaka-umeda; Kobe-Sannomiya
- Stations: 19

Service
- Type: Commuter rail
- System: Hankyu Railway
- Operator: Hankyu Corporation
- Depot: Nishinomiya Depot
- Rolling stock: see Rolling stock

History
- Opened: 16 January 1920; 106 years ago

Technical
- Line length: 32.3 km (20.1 mi)
- Number of tracks: Double
- Track gauge: 1,435 mm (4 ft 8 1/2 in)
- Electrification: 1,500 V DC (overhead line)
- Operating speed: 115 km/h (71 mph)
Route map

The Kōbe Main Line (神戸本線, Kōbe Honsen) of Hankyu Railway is one of the three major commuter heavy rail lines in the Keihanshin conurbation of Japan. It links the urban centres of Osaka and Kobe by connecting the major stations of Umeda in Osaka and Sannomiya in Kobe.

The Hanshin Electric Railway Main Line and West Japan Railway Company (JR West) Tokaido Main Line (this section nicknamed JR Kobe Line) are the two lines parallel to the Hankyu Kobe Line within a short distance of each other.

== Definition ==
The line is commonly called Kobe Line (神戸線, Kōbe sen) for short, but in the broader sense 'Kobe Line' refers to the entire network of the trunk Kobe Main Line and connecting branch lines of Itami, Imazu and Kōyō Lines.

== Network ==
At the Kobe end of the line some trains continue through onto the Kobe Rapid Railway, an underground line allowing interchange between the lines of several commuter rail companies operating in Kobe.

The Kobe Main Line has interchanges at several of its stations with other lines operated by Hankyu. The Hankyu main lines to Kyoto and Takarazuka share stations at Umeda and Juso with the Kobe Line. The other lines with connections to the Kobe line are smaller lines with only local trains: the Itami Line connects at Tsukaguchi, the Imazu Line at Nishinomiya-kitaguchi and the Koyo Line at Shukugawa.

== History ==
The Umeda - Juso section was opened in 1910 as part of the Hankyu Takarazuka Line.

The Juso - Oji-Koen section opened as a 1435mm gauge line electrified at 600 V DC in 1920. In 1926 the line was duplicated, and in 1936 it was extended to Kobe Sannomiya. In 1967 the voltage was increased to 1,500 V DC.

Until 1936, the line's terminal in Kobe was in Kamitsutsui. As a branch of the main line, the 1 km (0.62 mi) line between Oji-Koen Station and Kamitsutsui Station continued to provide a connection to the Kobe tram network until 1941.

The Kobe Main Line was damaged by the Great Hanshin earthquake in January 1995. Restoration work on the Kobe Line took 7 months to complete.

Station numbering was introduced on 21 December 2013.

=== Future plans ===
A new station will be built near the Muko River between Nishinomiya-Kitaguchi and Mukonosō. The project, which includes a bicycle parking lot and reconstruction of the surrounding roads, is expected to cost ¥6 billion. Agreements to build the station were signed by the railway and the national treasury was signed in October 2022. By 11 April 2025, the station had reached the initial construction stage, including the awarding of contracts and the establishment of a memorandum of understanding; further design work is expected later in the year with an opening date set for 2031.

== Train services ==
Only local trains (普通) and limited express trains (特急) which stop only at major stations along the line, are operated during midday and all day on weekends. Other commuter and express services operate only early mornings, commuting times, and late nights.

- Local trains (普通) stop at all stations, all times of the day. Most operate between Osaka-Umeda and Kobe-Sannomiya, but some start and end at Nishinomiya-Kitaguchi.
- Semi-Express trains (準急) are operated from Takarazuka to Osaka-Umeda via the Imazu Line and the Kobe Line on weekday mornings.
- Rapid trains (快速) operate on weekdays, from Kobe-Sannomiya to Osaka-Umeda in the morning, and from Osaka-Umeda to Kobe-Sannomiya or Shinkaichi in the evening rush hour.
- Express trains (急行) operate from Osaka-Umeda to Kobe-Sannomiya or Shinkaichi late nights, as well as one eastbound train in the mornings.
- Semi-Limited Express (準特急) operate from Osaka-Umeda to Kosoku Kobe or Shinkaichi evenings on weekdays, and late nights, as well as one early morning train towards Osaka-Umeda.
- Commuter Limited Express trains (通勤特急) operate in both directions on weekday mornings. The last car (to Osaka-Umeda) or the first car (to Kobe-Sannomiya) is for women only.
- Limited Express trains (特急) operate in both directions, midday on weekdays and all times except early morning and late night on weekends, when other limited express trains are not running.
- Maximum speed: 115 km/h (71 mph)

== Stations ==
- ● : All trains stop
- | : All trains pass
- ◆ : Extra services to the Imazu Line pass

No.	Station	Native Name	km	Semi-Express	Rapid	Express	Semi-Limited Express	Commuter Limited Express	Limited Express	Connections	Location	
Kobe Line
HK-01	Osaka-Umeda	大阪梅田	0.0	●	●	●	●	●	●	Hanshin Electric Railway Main Line (HS 01: Osaka-Umeda); Osaka Metro; Midosuji Line (M16: Umeda); Tanimachi Line (T20: Higashi-Umeda Station); Yotsubashi Line (Y11: Nishi-Umeda Station); JR West (Ōsaka Station); Tōkaidō Main Line; JR Kyoto Line (JR-A47); JR Kobe Line (JR-A47); JR Takarazuka Line (JR-G47); Osaka Higashi Line (JR-F01); Osaka Loop Line (JR-O11); JR Tōzai Line (JR-H44: Kitashinchi Station)	Kita-ku, Osaka	Osaka
HK-02	Nakatsu	中津	0.9	↑	|	|	|	|	|		Kita-ku, Osaka	Osaka
HK-03	Jūsō	十三	2.4	●	●	●	●	●	●	Takarazuka Line, Kyoto Line	Yodogawa-ku, Osaka	Osaka
HK-04	Kanzakigawa	神崎川	4.1	↑	|	|	|	|	|		Yodogawa-ku, Osaka	Osaka
HK-05	Sonoda	園田	7.2	↑	|	|	|	|	|		Amagasaki	Hyōgo
HK-06	Tsukaguchi	塚口	10.2	●	|	●	●	●	|	Itami Line	Amagasaki	Hyōgo
HK-07	Mukonosō	武庫之荘	12.3	↑	●	|	|	|	|		Amagasaki	Hyōgo
HK-08	Nishinomiya-kitaguchi	西宮北口	15.6	↑	●	◆	●	●	●	Imazu Line	Nishinomiya	Hyōgo
HK-09	Shukugawa	夙川	18.3		●	●	●	●	●	Koyo Line	Nishinomiya	Hyōgo
HK-10	Ashiyagawa	芦屋川	21.0		●	●	|	|	|		Ashiya	Hyōgo
HK-11	Okamoto	岡本	23.4		●	●	●	●	●		Higashinada-ku, Kobe	Hyōgo
HK-12	Mikage	御影	25.6		●	●	|	|	|		Higashinada-ku, Kobe	Hyōgo
HK-13	Rokko	六甲	27.4		●	●	●	|	|		Nada-ku, Kobe	Hyōgo
HK-14	Oji-Koen	王子公園	29.2		●	●	|	|	|		Nada-ku, Kobe	Hyōgo
HK-15	Kasuganomichi	春日野道	30.7		●	●	|	|	|		Chūō-ku, Kobe	Hyōgo
HK-16	Kobe Sannomiya	神戸三宮	32.3		●	●	●	●	●	JR West Tōkaidō Main Line (JR Kobe Line) (JR-A61: Sannomiya Station); Hanshin Electric Railway Main Line (HS 32); Kobe New Transit Port Island Line (P01); Kobe Municipal Subway; Seishin-Yamate Line (S03); Kaigan Line (K01: Sannomiya-Hanadokeimae Station)	Chūō-ku, Kobe	Hyōgo
Kobe Kosoku Line
HK-17	Hanakuma	花隈	33.6		●	●	●	●	●		Chūō-ku, Kobe	Hyōgo
HS 35	Kosoku Kobe	高速神戸	34.5		●	●	●	●	●	Hanshin Railway Kobe Kosoku Line; JR West Tōkaidō Main Line and San'yō Main Line (JR Kobe Line) (JR-A63: Kobe Station); Kobe Municipal Subway Kaigan Line (K04: Harborland Station)	Chūō-ku, Kobe	Hyōgo
HS 36	Shinkaichi	新開地	35.1		●	●	●	●	●	Hanshin Railway Kobe Kosoku Line (to Sanyo Railway); Kobe Railway (Shintetsu): Kobe Kosoku Line (KB01)	Hyōgo-ku, Kobe	Hyōgo
Through services:				From Nishinomiya-Kitaguchi: Semi-Express from Imazu Line for Takarazuka (Extra services) Express trains: Imazu Line for Nigawa								

== Rolling stock ==
- 1000 series EMU (from November 2013)
- 2000 series EMU (from December 2025)
- 6000 series EMU
- 7000 series EMU
- 8000 series EMU
- 8200 series EMU (Rush hour only)
- 9000 series EMU

=== Former ===
- 1000 series EMU (1954)
- 1010 series EMU
- 1200 series EMU
- 2000 series EMU
- 2200 series EMU
- 2300 series EMU (Temporary)
- 3000 series EMU
- 5000 series EMU
- 5100 series EMU
- 5200 series EMU

== See also ==
- Hankyū Kyōto Main Line
- Hankyū Takarazuka Main Line
