= Hankyu 8200 series =

Japanese train type

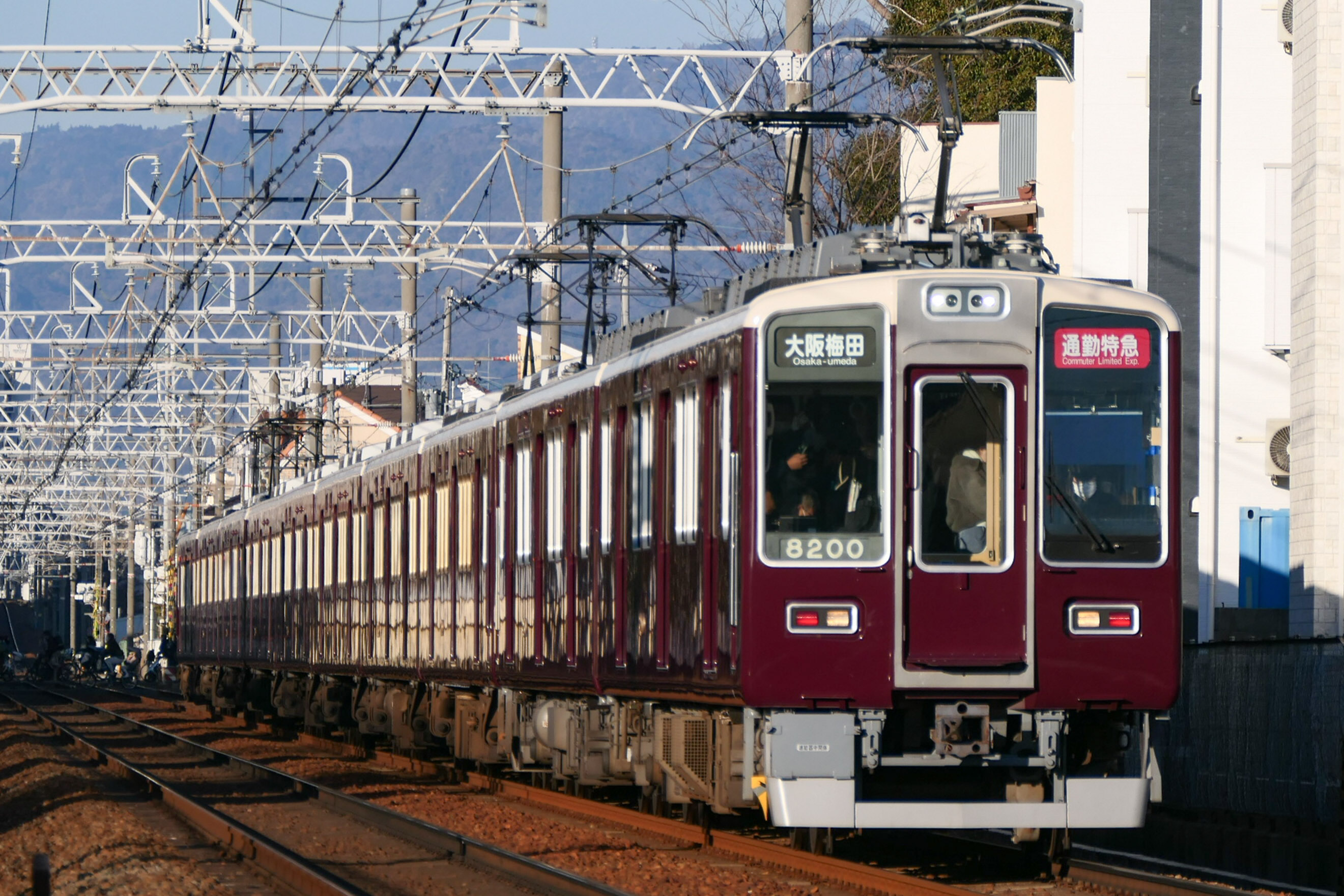
- An 8200 series set leading a service on the Kobe Main Line

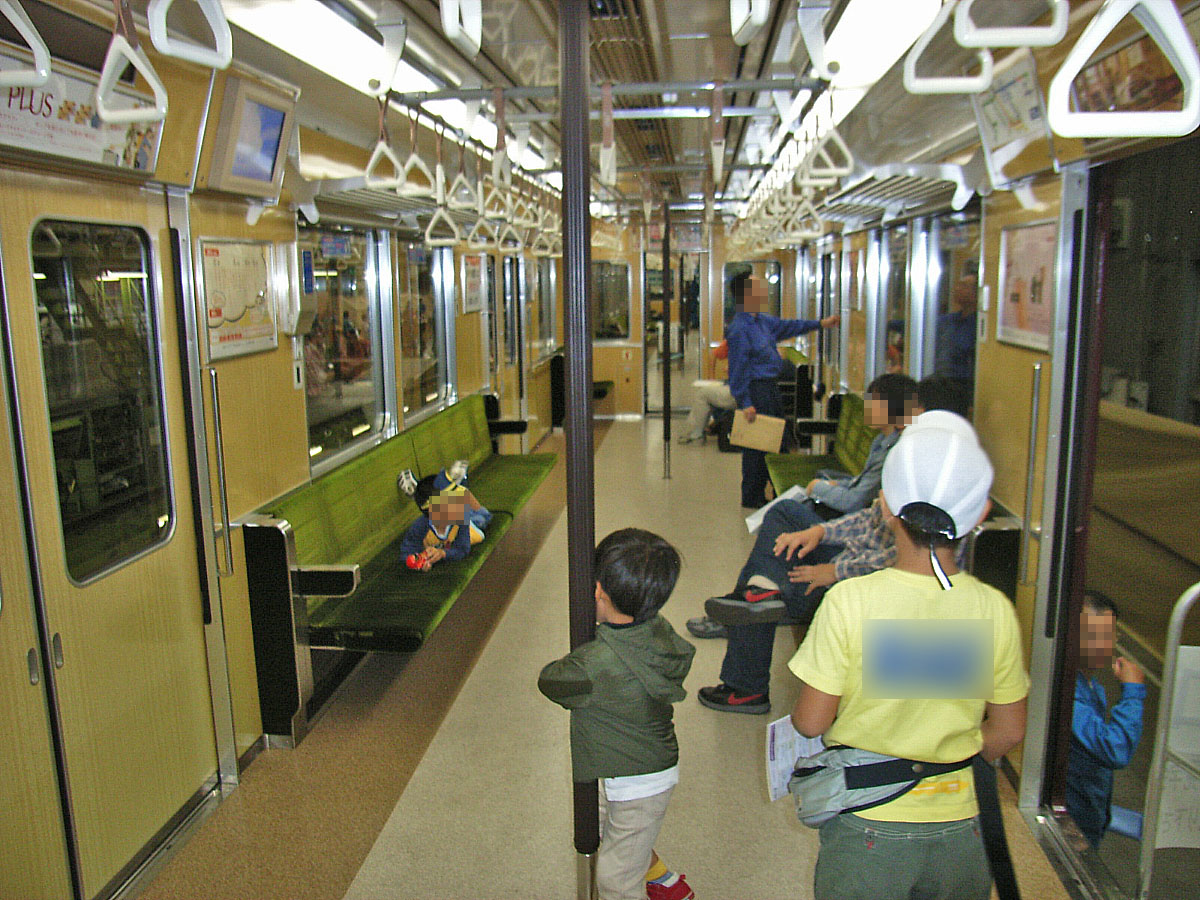
- Stock type: Electric multiple unit
- In service: 1995–present
- Manufacturer: Alna Kōki
- Constructed: 1995
- Entered service: 12 June 1995
- Number built: 4 vehicles (2 sets)
- Number in service: 4 vehicles (2 sets)
- Formation: 2-car sets
- Operator: Hankyu Railway
- Depot: Nishinomiya
- Lines served: Kōbe Main Line; Imazu Line

Specifications
- Car body construction: Aluminium alloy
- Train length: 38 m (124 ft 8 in)
- Car length: 19 m (62 ft 4 in)
- Width: 2.75 m (9 ft 0 in)
- Height: 4,095 mm (13 ft 5.2 in)
- Doors: 3 per side
- Maximum speed: 110 km/h (68 mph)
- Weight: 66.6 t (65.5 long tons; 73.4 short tons)
- Traction system: Toshiba SVF018-A0 GTO–VVVF
- Traction motors: 3 × Toshiba SEA-350 200 kW (270 hp) asynchronous 3-phase AC
- Power output: 600 kW (800 hp)
- Transmission: WN drive
- Gear ratio: 6.13:1
- Acceleration: 2.6 km/(h⋅s) (1.6 mph/s)
- Deceleration: 3.7 km/(h⋅s) (2.3 mph/s)
- Electric systems: 1,500 V DC (nominal) from overhead catenary
- Current collection: Pantograph
- UIC classification: Bo′(1A)+2′2′
- Wheels driven: 6 out of 16
- Bogies: SS-139A, SS-039A
- Braking systems: Electro-pneumatic and regenerative
- Safety systems: ATS, dead man's switch
- Coupling system: Shibata close-contact
- Multiple working: 7000 series, 8000 series, 9000 series
- Track gauge: 1,435 mm (4 ft 8 1/2 in) standard gauge

Notes/references
- Sourced from except where noted

The Hankyu 8200 series (阪急電鉄8200系) is an electric multiple unit (EMU) train type operated in Japan by the private railway operator Hankyu Railway since 1995.

== Operations ==
The 8200 series sets were used during the weekday morning rush hour on the Kobe Main Line to provide additional capacity for Commuter Limited Express and Rapid Express trains. They were also formerly used during the evening rush hour. Following the discontinuation of 10-car trains on the Kobe Main Line in February 2025, the 8200 series began operating on the Imazu Line between Nishinomiya-Kitaguchi and Takarazuka on 16 June of that year.

== Formations ==
The fleet consists of two 2-car sets, formed as follows.

Designation	Mc1	Tc
Numbering	8200	8250
Numbering	8201	8251

The "Mc1" cars are fitted with two single-arm pantographs.

== Interior ==
The sets were built with tip-up seats to increase passenger capacity, but these were later replaced with fixed longitudinal seating.
