= Hankyu 8000 series =

Japanese train type

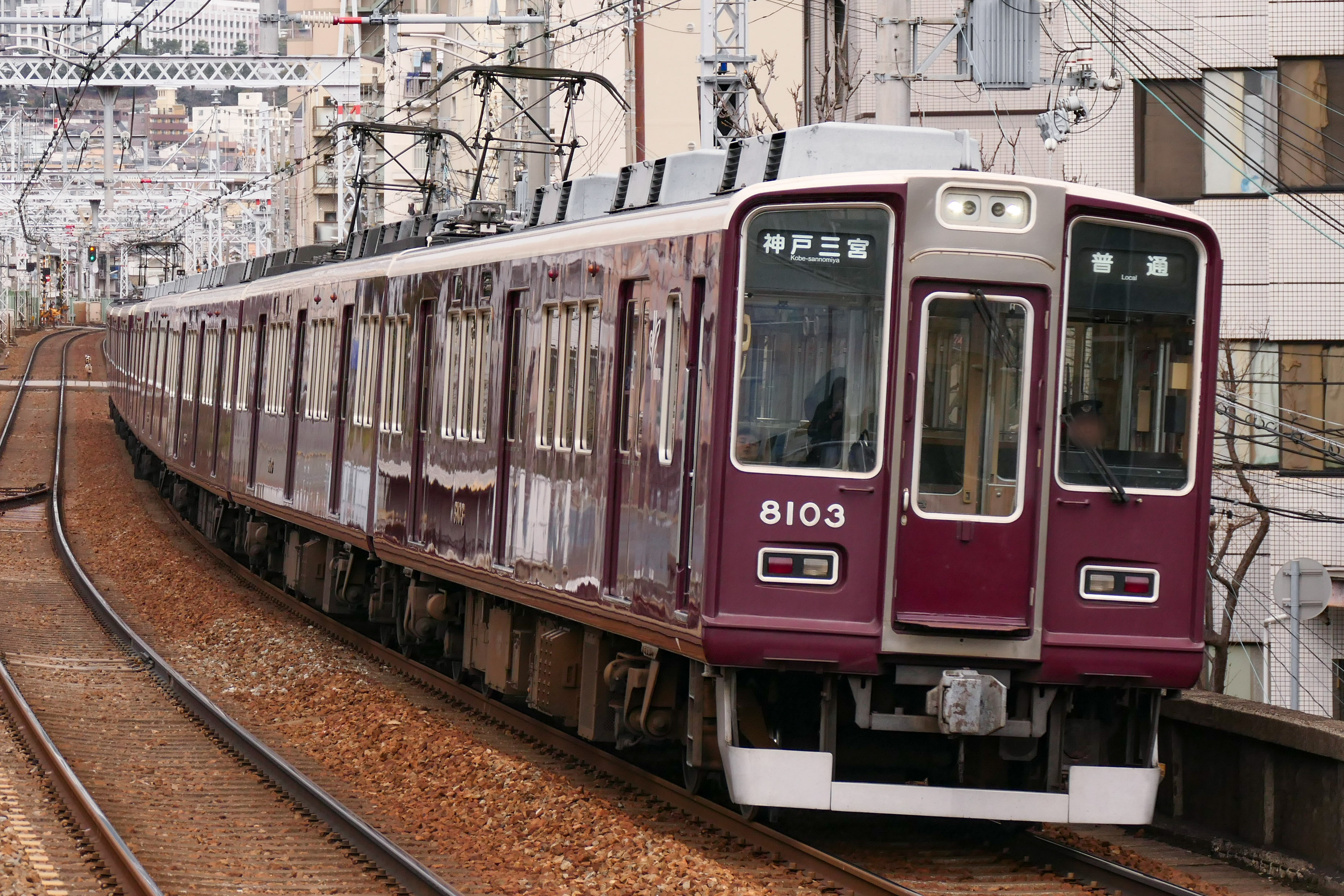
- Set 8003 featuring alternative front end design, in January 2020
- In service: 1989–
- Manufacturer: Alna Kōki
- Replaced: 2000 series, 3100 series, 5200 series and damaged by the 1995 Great Hanshin Earthquake
- Constructed: 1988–1993, 1996, 1997
- Refurbished: 2020–
- Number built: 98 vehicles (19 sets)
- Number in service: 98 vehicles (19 sets)
- Formation: 2/8 (formerly 6) cars per trainset
- Operators: Hankyu Railway
- Depots: Hirai, Nishinomiya
- Lines served: Hankyu Kobe Main Line; Hankyu Kobe Kosoku Line; Hankyū Takarazuka Main Line; Hankyu Minoo Line; Nose Railway Myōken Line; Nose Railway Nissei Line

Specifications
- Car body construction: Aluminium alloy
- Car length: 19,000 mm (62 ft 4 in)
- Width: 2,750 mm (9 ft 0 in)
- Height: 4,095 mm (13 ft 5.2 in)
- Doors: 3 pairs per side
- Maximum speed: 115 km/h (71 mph)
- Traction system: Variable frequency GTO; IGBT (Sets 8000, 8001, 8002, 8004, 8005, 8008)
- Traction motors: Induction motors Brushless electric motors (PMSM) (Sets 8000, 8001, 8002, 8004, 8005, 8008)
- Power output: 170 kW (230 hp) per motor
- Acceleration: 2.6 km/h/s
- Electric system(s): 1,500 V DC overhead catenary
- Current collection: Pantograph
- Bogies: FS-369A, FS-069A; SS-139A, SS-039A (Sets 8040 to 8042)
- Braking system(s): Regenerative brake Electronically controlled pneumatic brakes
- Safety system(s): ATS
- Coupling system: Shibata-type (Type Mc8000/Tc8150); Knuckle-type (Type Mc8100)
- Multiple working: 6000 series, 7000 series, 8200 series, 9000 series
- Track gauge: 1,435 mm (4 ft 8 1/2 in)

The Hankyu 8000 series (阪急電鉄8000系) is an electric multiple unit (EMU) train type operated in Japan by the private railway operator Hankyu Railway since 1989.

== Formations ==
As of 1 April 2012, the fleet consisted of ten eight-car sets and nine two-car sets. Some of the two-car sets are semi-permanently coupled with 6-car 7000 series sets. Six-car sets were also operated initially, but these were subsequently lengthened to become eight-car sets.

=== 8-car sets ===
Car No.	1	2	3	4	5	6	7	8
Designation	Mc1	M2	T1	T2	T2	T1	M1	Mc2
Numbering	8000	8600	8550	8750	8780	8650	8500	8100

- The "Mc1" and "M1" cars are each fitted with two scissors-type pantographs.
- The "Mc1" and "M1" cars of set 8008 are each fitted with two single-arm pantographs.
- Car 5 of set 8020 is numbered 8670 (type T8550), and car 6 is numbered 8790 (type T8750).
- Cars 7 and 8 of sets 8002 to 8007 include transverse seating.

=== 2-car sets ===
==== Sets 8030 to 8035 ====
Car No.	1	2
Designation	Mc1	Tc
Numbering	8030	8150

- Sets 8031, 8032, and 8035 are semi-permanently coupled with 6-car 7000 series sets.
- The "Mc1" cars are fitted with two scissors-type pantographs.
- Sets from 8033 onward have a modified front end design.

==== Sets 8040 to 8042 ====
Car No.	1	2
Designation	Mc1	Tc
Numbering	8040	8190

The "Mc1" cars are fitted with two single-arm pantographs.

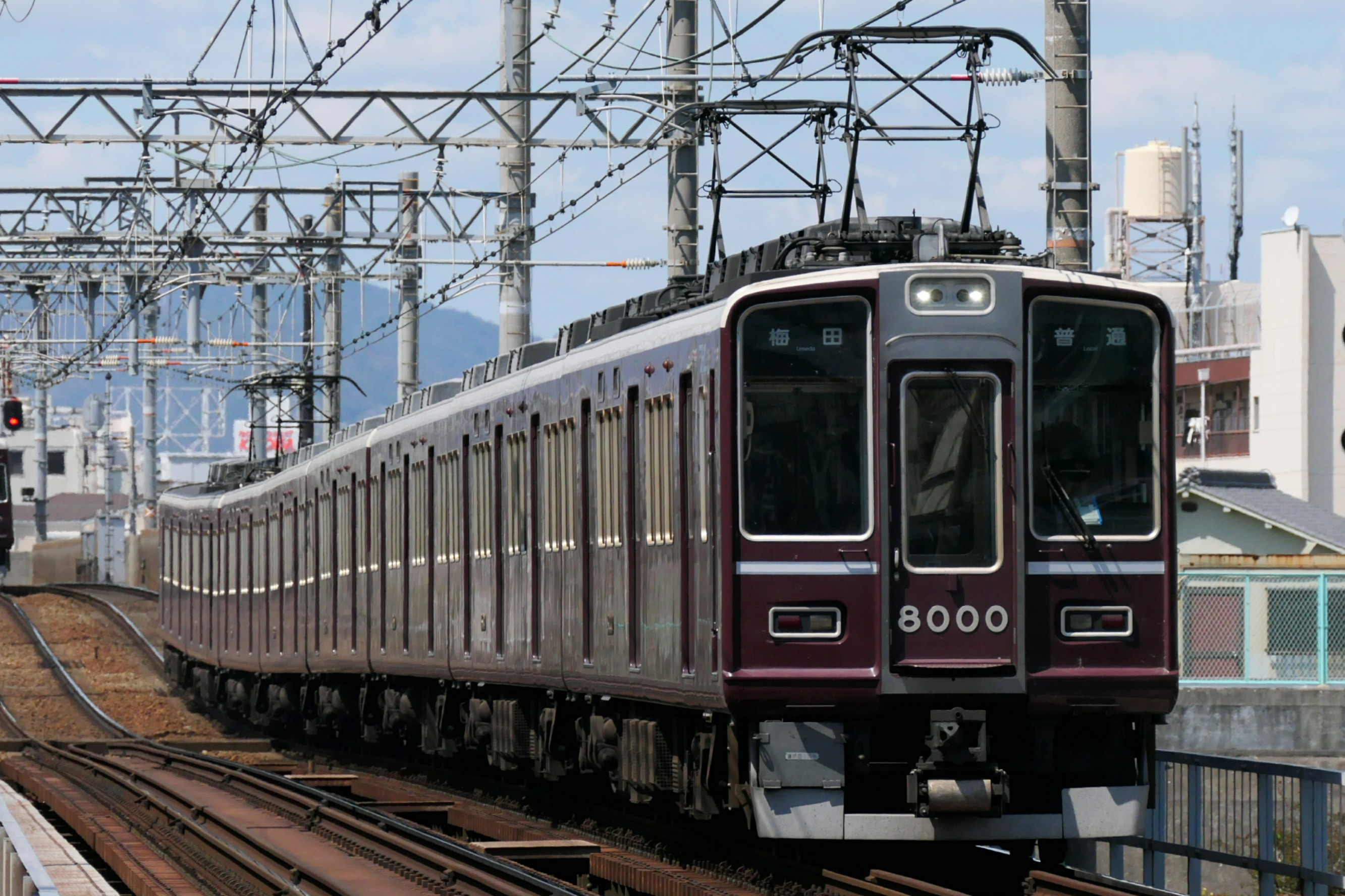
Set 8000 "classic 8000" livery, July 2019

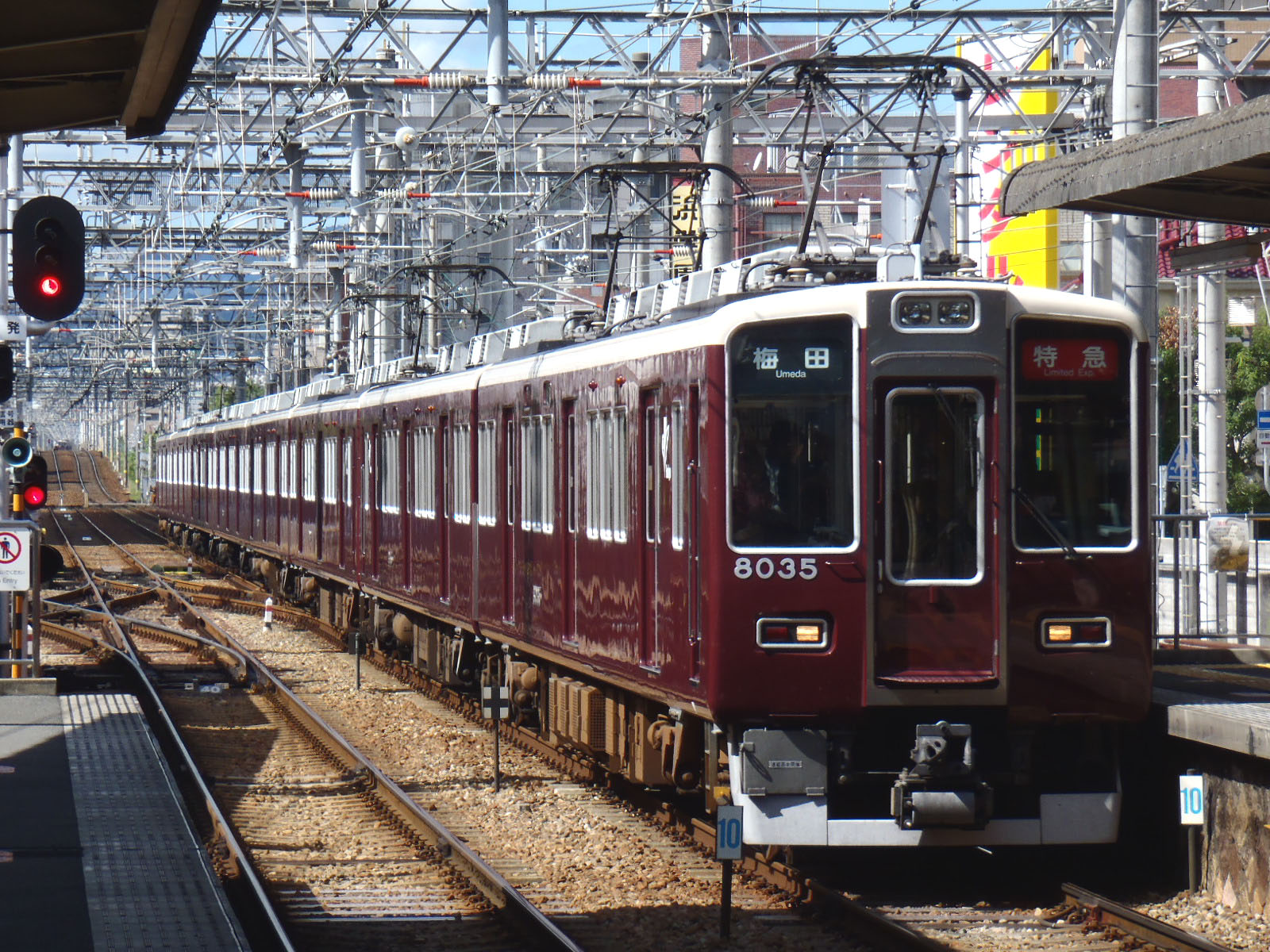
8000 series second build train, October 2010

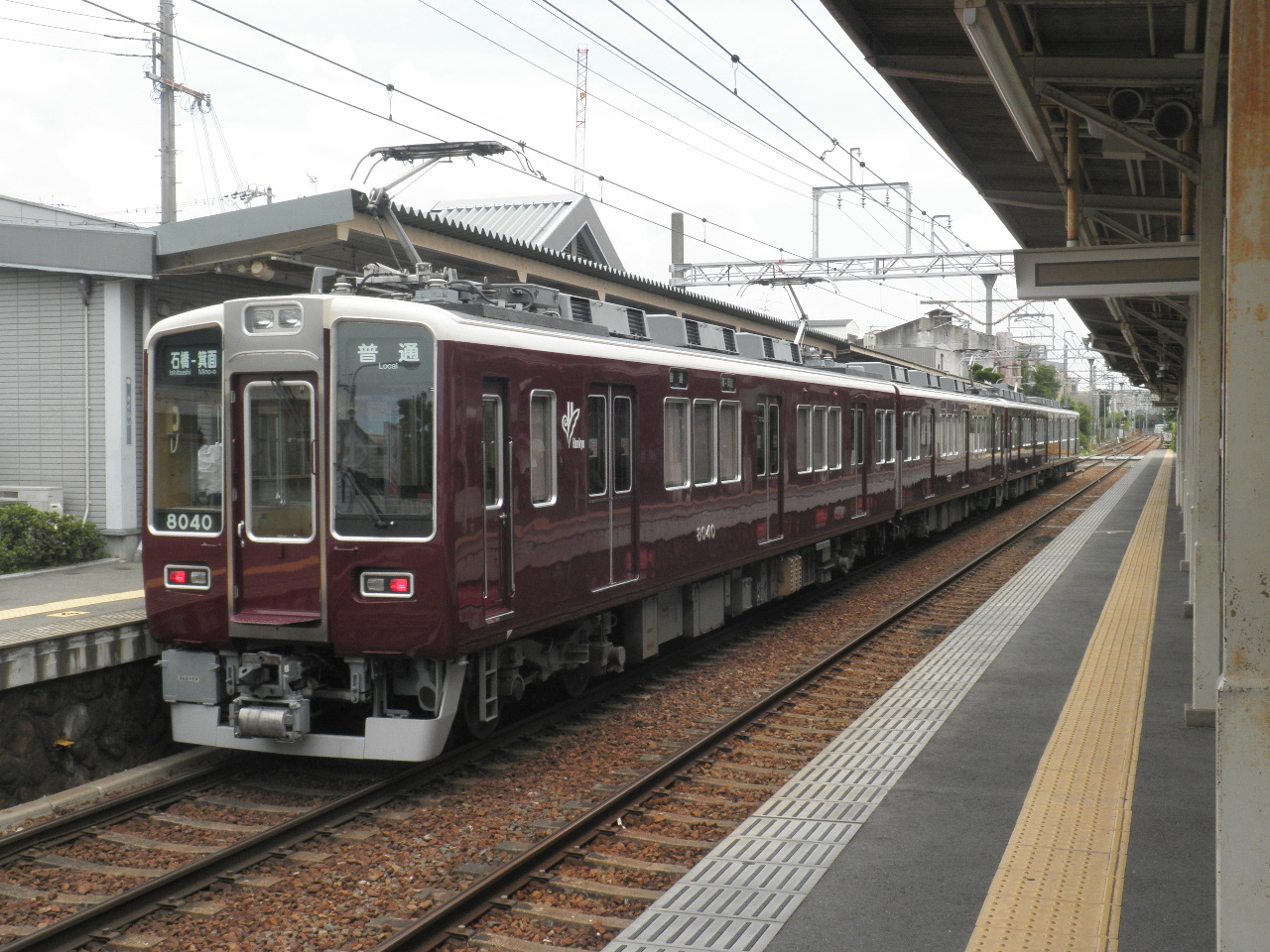
8000 series third build train, June 2015

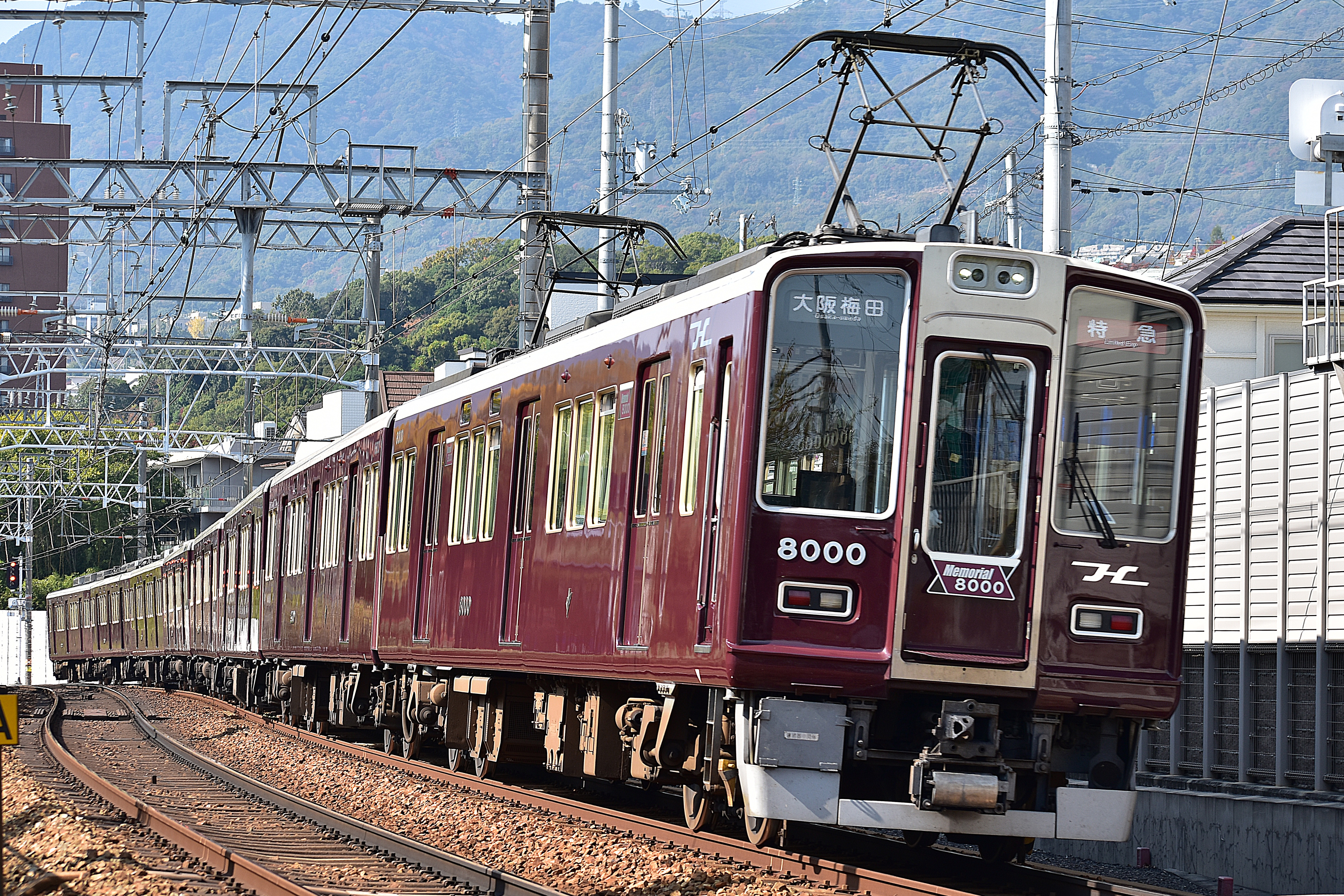
Set 8000 "Memorial 8000" November 2022
