= Hankyu 7000 series =

Japanese electric multiple unit train type

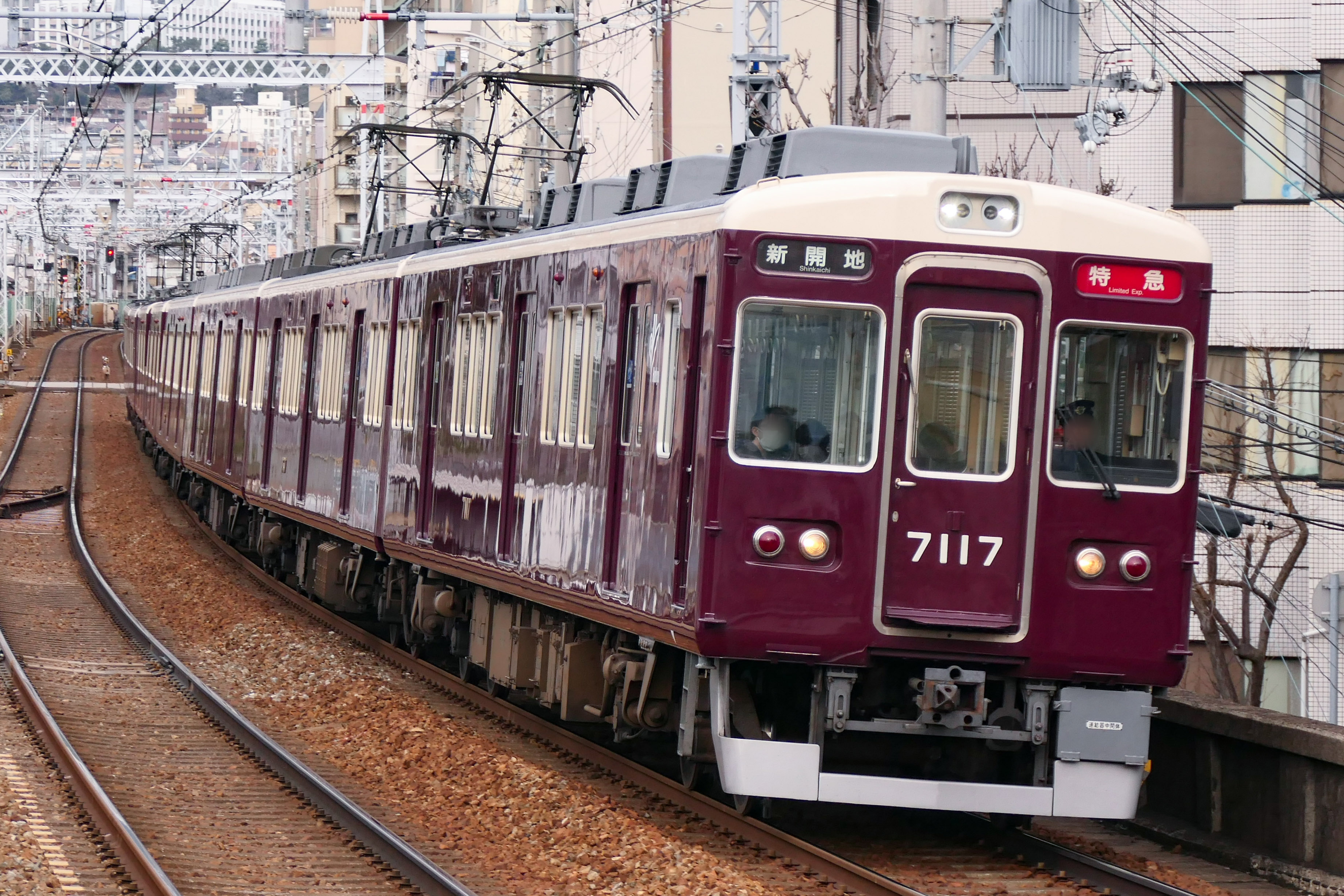
- Hankyu 7017 at Ōji-kōen Station on a service to Shinkaichi
- In service: 1980–present
- Manufacturer: Alna Kōki
- Constructed: 1980–1988
- Refurbished: 2009–
- Number built: 210 vehicles
- Number in service: 202 vehicles (Hankyu Railway) 8 vehicles (Nose Electric Railway)
- Formation: 2/4/6/8 cars per trainset
- Fleet numbers: 7001–7027, 7030–7037
- Operators: Hankyu Railway; Nose Electric Railway
- Depots: Hirai, Nishinomiya
- Lines served: Hankyu Kobe Main Line; Hankyu Kyoto Line (Kyō-train Garaku); Hankyu Kobe Kosoku Line; Hankyu Itami Line; Hankyu Imazu Line; Hankyu Kōyō Line; Hankyū Takarazuka Main Line; Hankyu Minoo Line; Nose Railway Myōken Line Nose Railway Nissei Line

Specifications
- Car body construction: Steel; Aluminum (Sets 7011, 7021 and later)
- Car length: 19,000 mm (62 ft 4 in)
- Width: 2,750 mm (9 ft 0 in)
- Height: 4,095 mm (13 ft 5.2 in)
- Doors: 3 pairs per side
- Maximum speed: 115 km/h (71 mph) (Kyoto and Kobe Lines); 100 km/h (62 mph) (Takarazuka Line); 130 km/h (81 mph) (Design)
- Traction system: Field chopper control Variable frequency (IGBT, sets 7011–7015, 7018, 7019, 7021, 7022, 7027 and Nose Electric Railway 7200 series)
- Traction motors: DC compound motor Permanent-magnet synchronous motor (sets 7011–7015, 7018, 7019, 7021, 7022, 7027 and Nose Electric Railway 7200 series)
- Power output: 150 kW (201 hp) per motor
- Acceleration: 2.8 km/(h⋅s) (1.7 mph/s)
- Deceleration: 3.7 km/(h⋅s) (2.3 mph/s) (operation); 4.2 km/(h⋅s) (2.6 mph/s) (emergency)
- Electric systems: 1,500 V DC (overhead catenary)
- Current collection: Pantograph
- Bogies: Minden German style direct mount air spring bogie FS-369A (M car) FS-069A (T car)
- Braking systems: Regenerative brake Electronically controlled pneumatic brakes
- Safety system: ATS
- Coupling system: Shibata-type; Knuckle-type
- Multiple working: 7300 series, 8000 series
- Track gauge: 1,435 mm (4 ft 8 1/2 in)

The Hankyu 7000 series (阪急電鉄7000系) is an electric multiple unit (EMU) train type operated in Japan by the private railway operator Hankyu since 1980.

== Overview ==
The 7000 series were built between 1980 and 1988 by Japanese rolling stock manufacturer Alna Koki. This type is the most common in the Hankyu fleet at 210 cars.

The trains are based on the previous 6000 series. In addition, the 7300 series are a derivative of the 7000 series.

== Formations ==
=== 8-car sets ===
As of November 2020, there are 19 eight-car sets in service; 16 sets are allocated to Kobe Line services while three sets are set aside for service on the Takarazuka Line.

Car No.	1	2	3	4	5	6	7	8
Designation	Mc	M'	T	T	T	T	M	M'c
Numbering	Mc 7000	M 7500	T 7550	T 7550	T 7550	T 7550	M 7600	Mc 7100

- The "Mc" and "M" cars are fitted with two scissors-type pantographs.

=== Kobe Line 8-car mixed 7000/8000 series sets ===
In June 2019, set 8042 was transferred over to Kobe Line operations and attached to 6-car set 7001.

Car No.	1	2	3	4	5	6	7	8
Designation	Mc1	Tc	Mc	M'	T	T	M	M'c
Numbering	Mc 8000	Tc 8150	Mc 7000	M 7500	T 7550	T 7550	M 7600	Mc 7100

=== Takarazuka Line 8-car mixed 7000/8000 series set ===
In 2016, two-car sets 7025 and 7026 and four-car set 7024 underwent inspection. In April 2017, two-car set 7025 was connected to two 6000 series cars and transferred to Nose Electric Railway as a four-car formation leaving 7024 and 7026 as a six-car set along with 8000 series two-car set 8030. Later in August, two-car set 7026 was divided from the train along with two-car set 8030. The resulting trainset is a 2–2–4 set with two-car sets 8040 and 8041 and four-car set 7024.

Car No.	1	2	3	4	5	6	7	8
Designation	Mc1	Tc	Mc1	Tc	Mc	T	T	M'c
Numbering	Mc 8000	Tc 8150	Mc 8000	Tc 8150	Mc 7000	T 7550	T 7550	Mc 7100

=== Kobe Line 4-car set ===
In March 2016, two-car sets 7034 and 7035 were combined to make a semi-permanent four-car train.

Car No.	1	2	3	4
Designation	Mc	Tc	Mc	Tc
Numbering	Mc 7000	Tc 7150	Mc 7000	Tc 7150

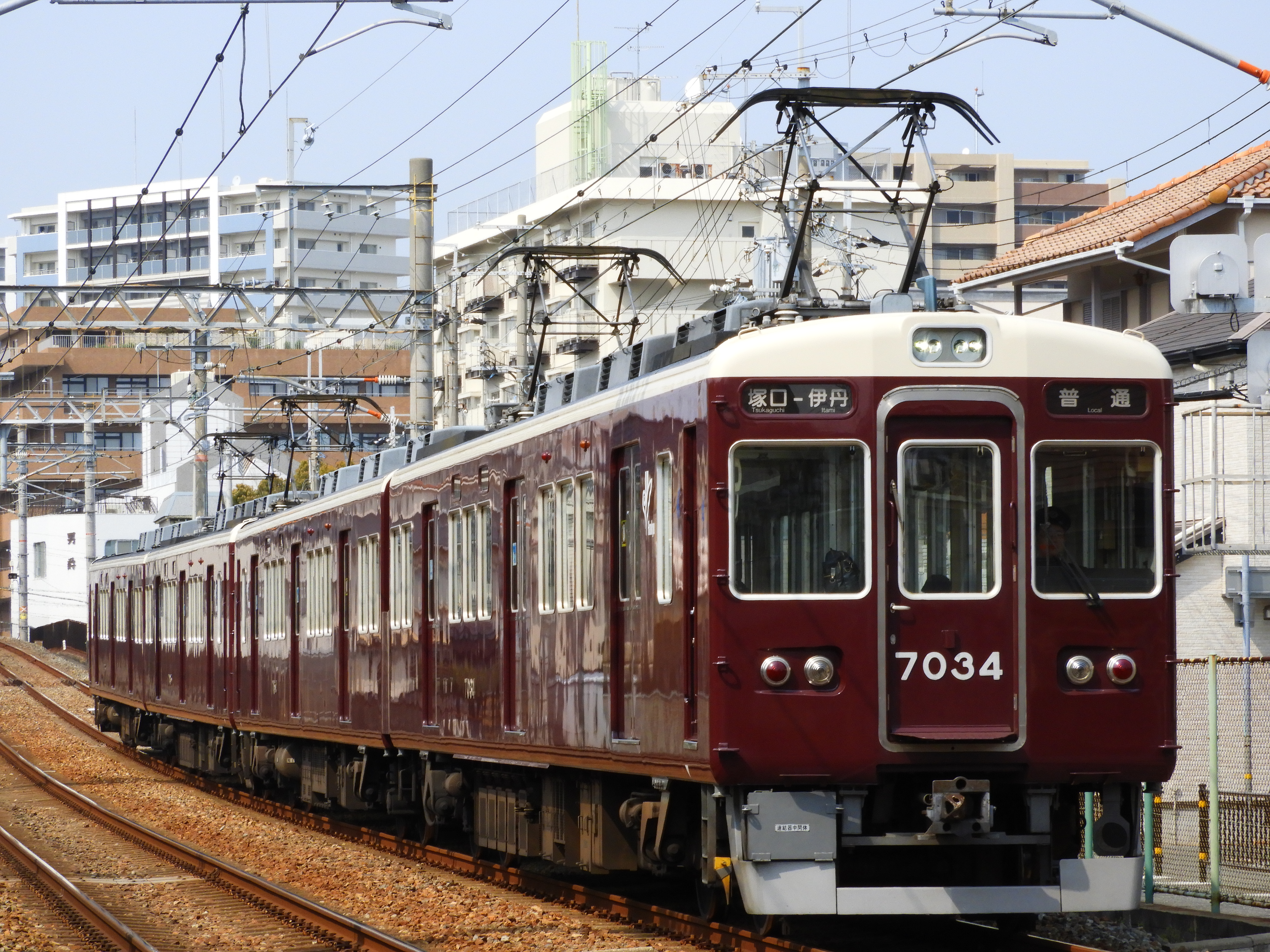
Four-car set 7034 on a local service

=== Takarazuka Line 4-car set ===
In August 2019, two-car 7031 was connected to two cars formerly belonging to Kobe line set 6050 to form a four-car set for the Minoo Line.

Car No.	1	2	3	4
Designation	Mc	T	M	Tc
Numbering	Mc 7000	T 7550	M 7600	Tc 7150

=== Nose Electric Railway 4-car set ===
Car No.	1	2	3	4
Designation	Mc	T	M	M'c
Numbering	Mc 7000	T 7550	M 7600	Mc 7100

=== 2-car sets ===
Car No.	1	2
Designation	Mc	Tc
Numbering	Mc 7000	Tc 7150

- The "Mc" car is fitted with two scissors-type pantographs.

== Interior ==
Passenger accommodation consists of longitudinal seating throughout. Paneling inside the car is composed of a light-brown faux wood finish.

== Kyo-Train "Garaku" ==
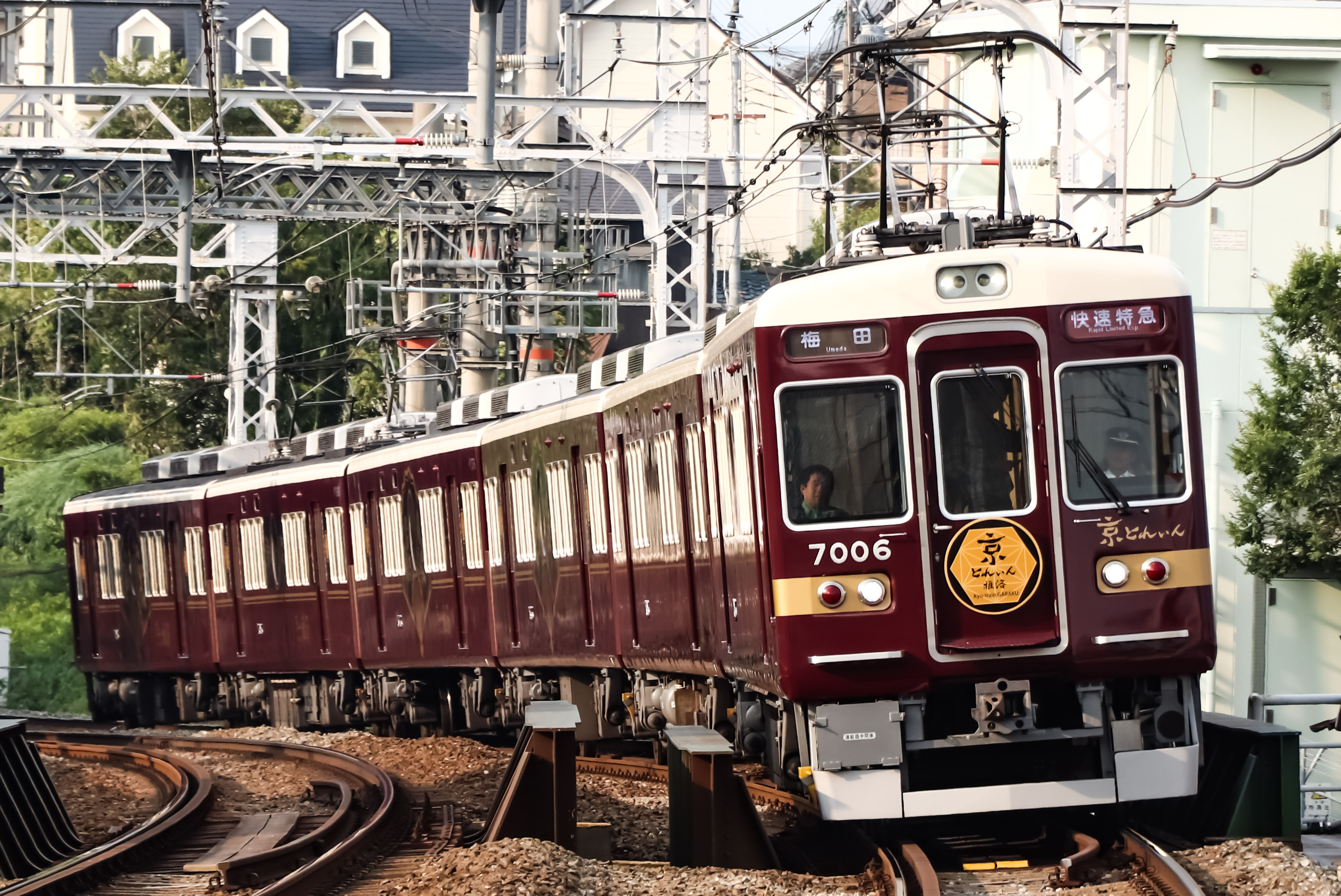
Kyo-Train "Garaku" set 7006

On 22 May 2018, Hankyu announced that they would be introducing a second train to their Kyo-Train lineup. It would be composed of six-car set 7006. The train was named the "Kyo-Train Garaku" in December of that year and entered service on 23 March 2019. This set has the middle door removed on all cars, effectively making it two doors per side per car.

Car No.	1	2	3	4	5	6
Designation	Mc	M'	T	T	M	M'c
Numbering	Mc 7006	M 7506	T 7566	T 7576	M 7606	Mc 7106

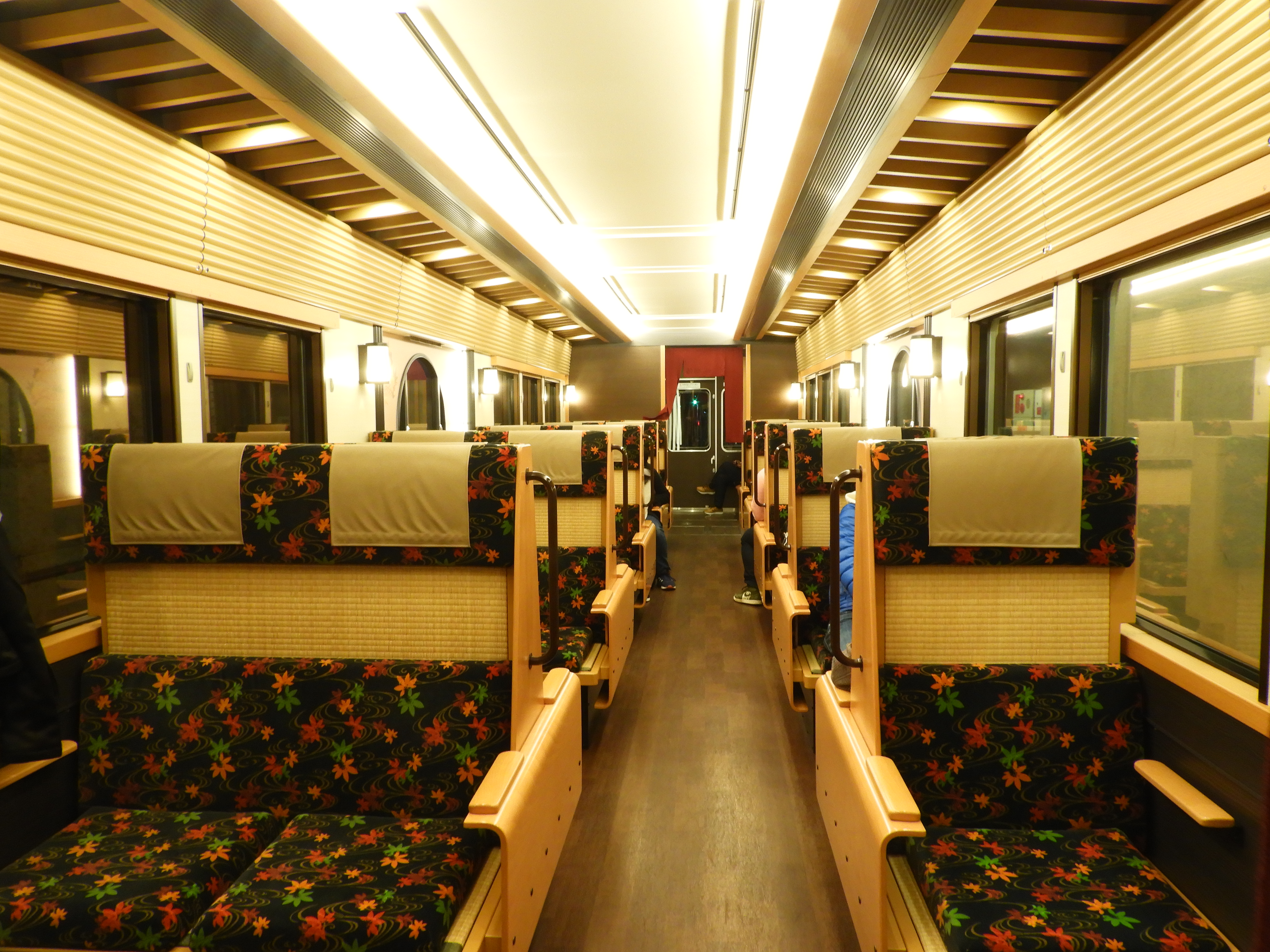
Interior of car 1

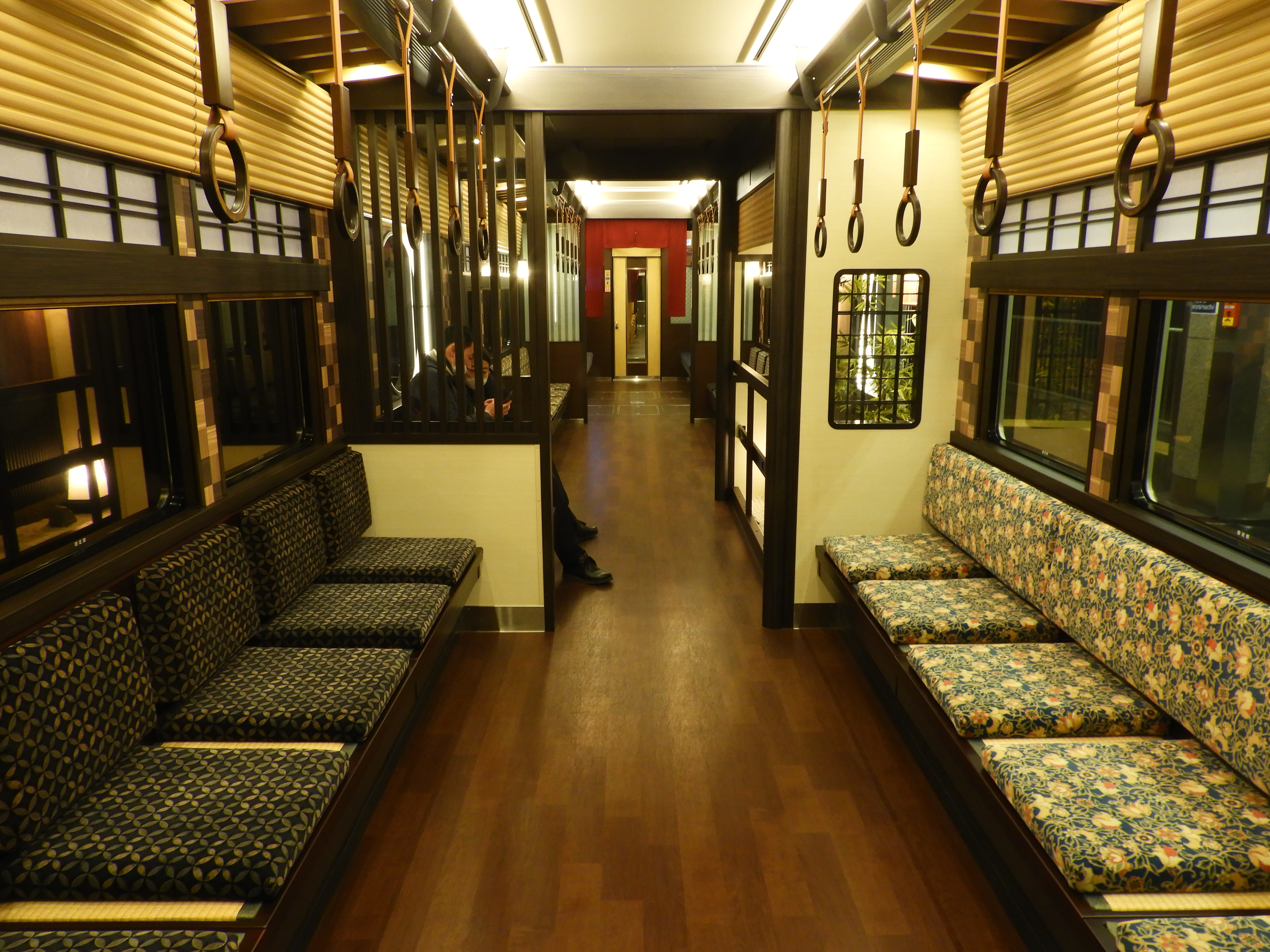
Interior of car 2

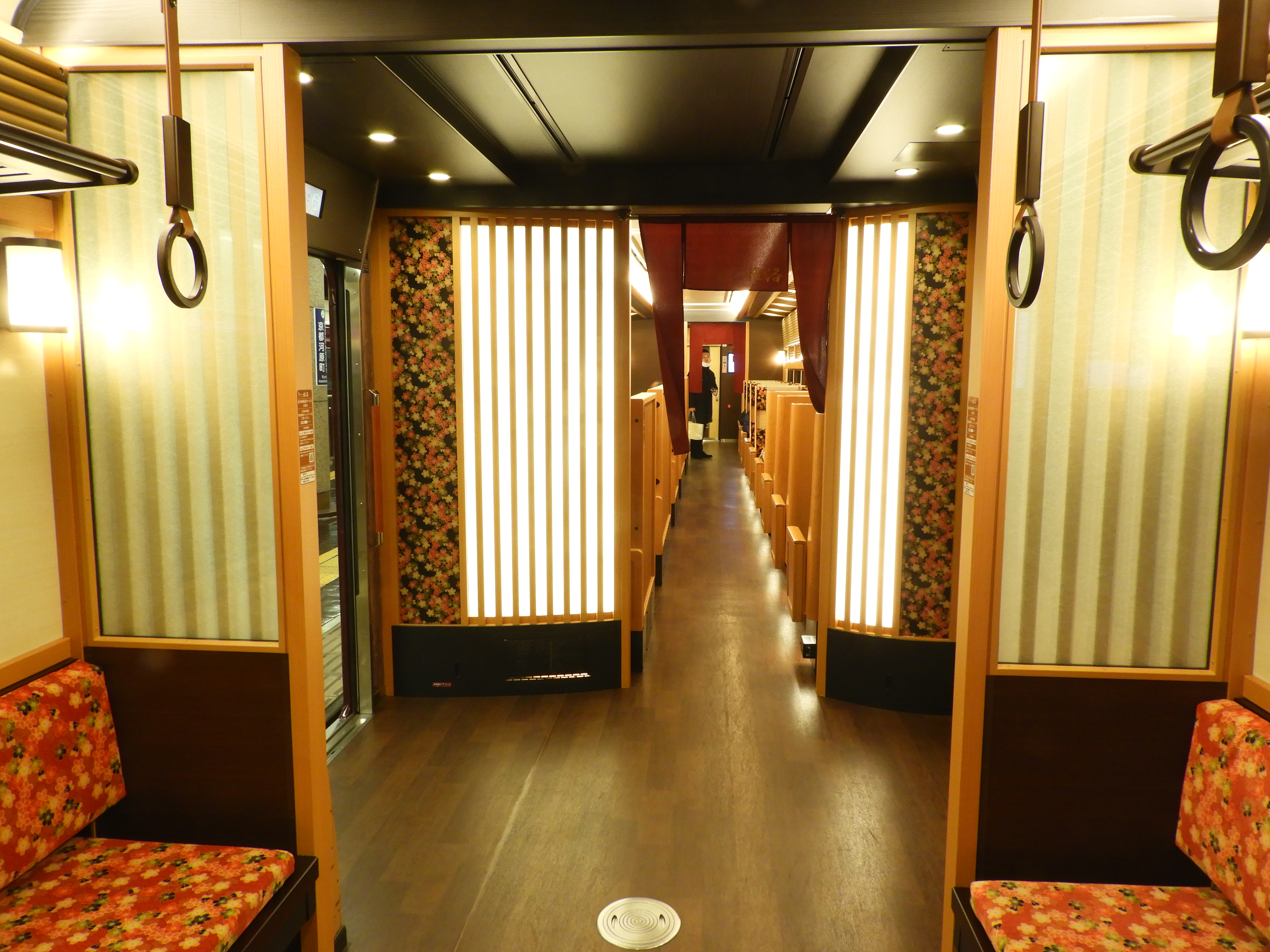
Interior of car 3

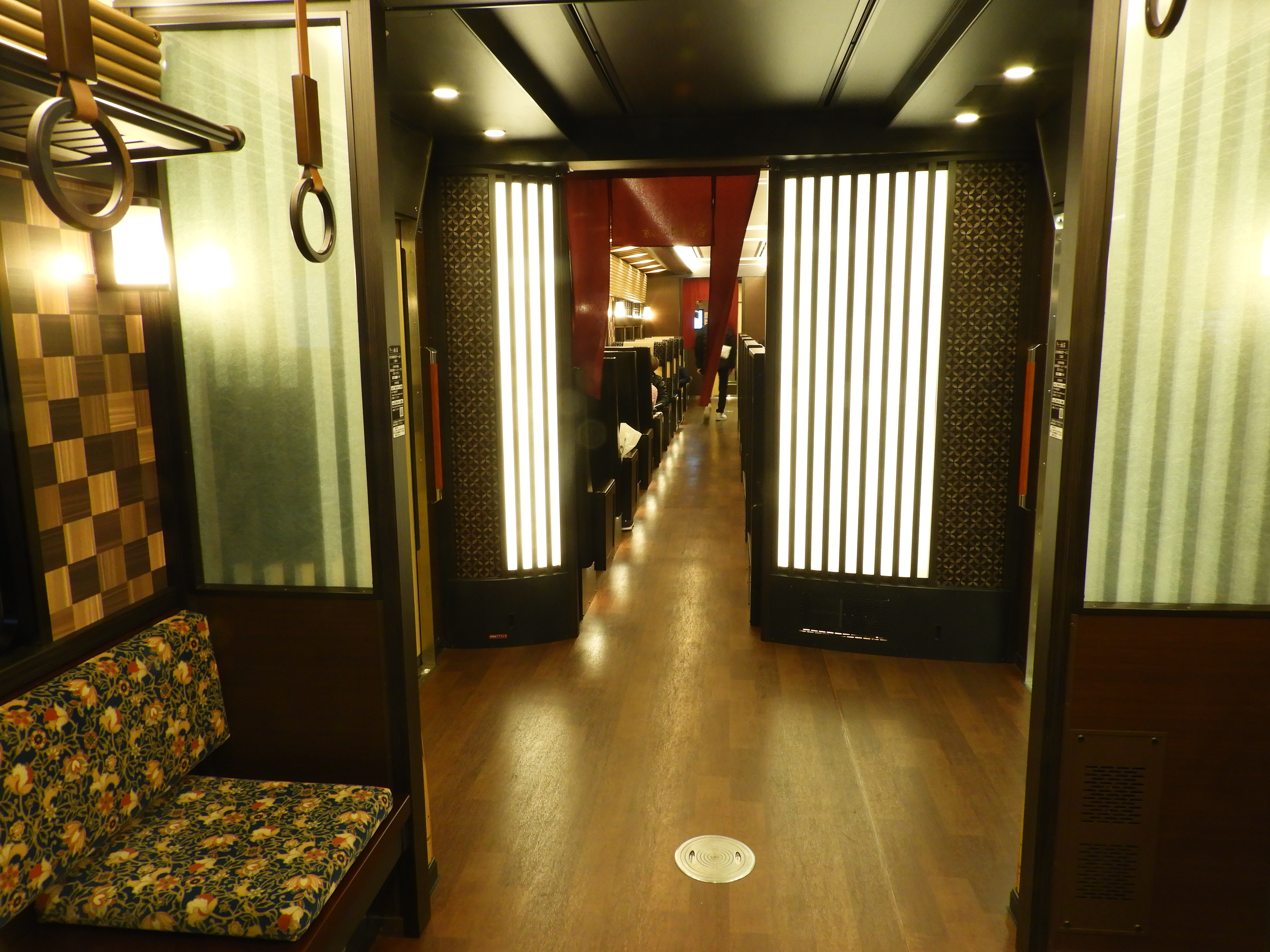
Interior of car 4

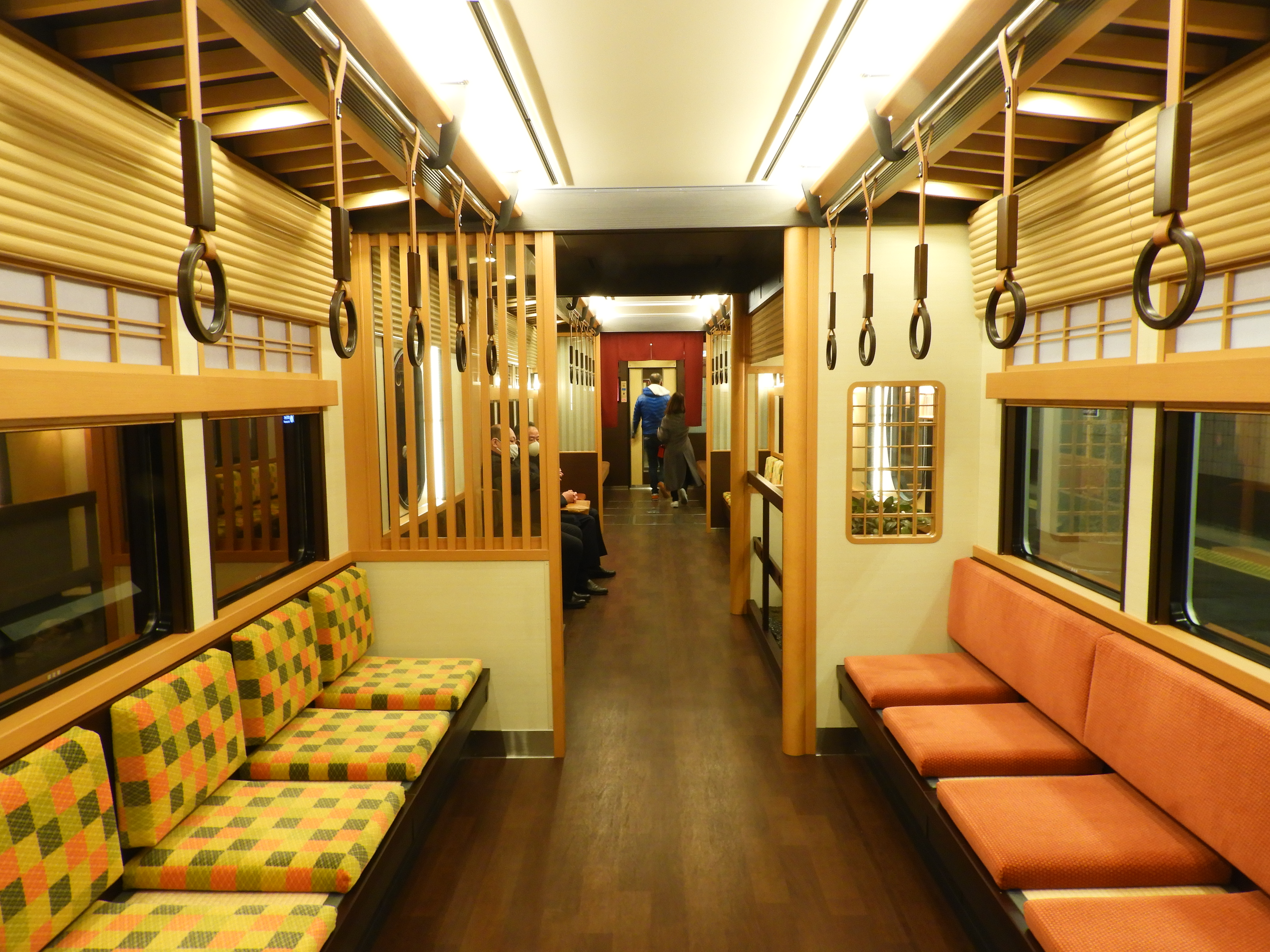
Interior of car 5

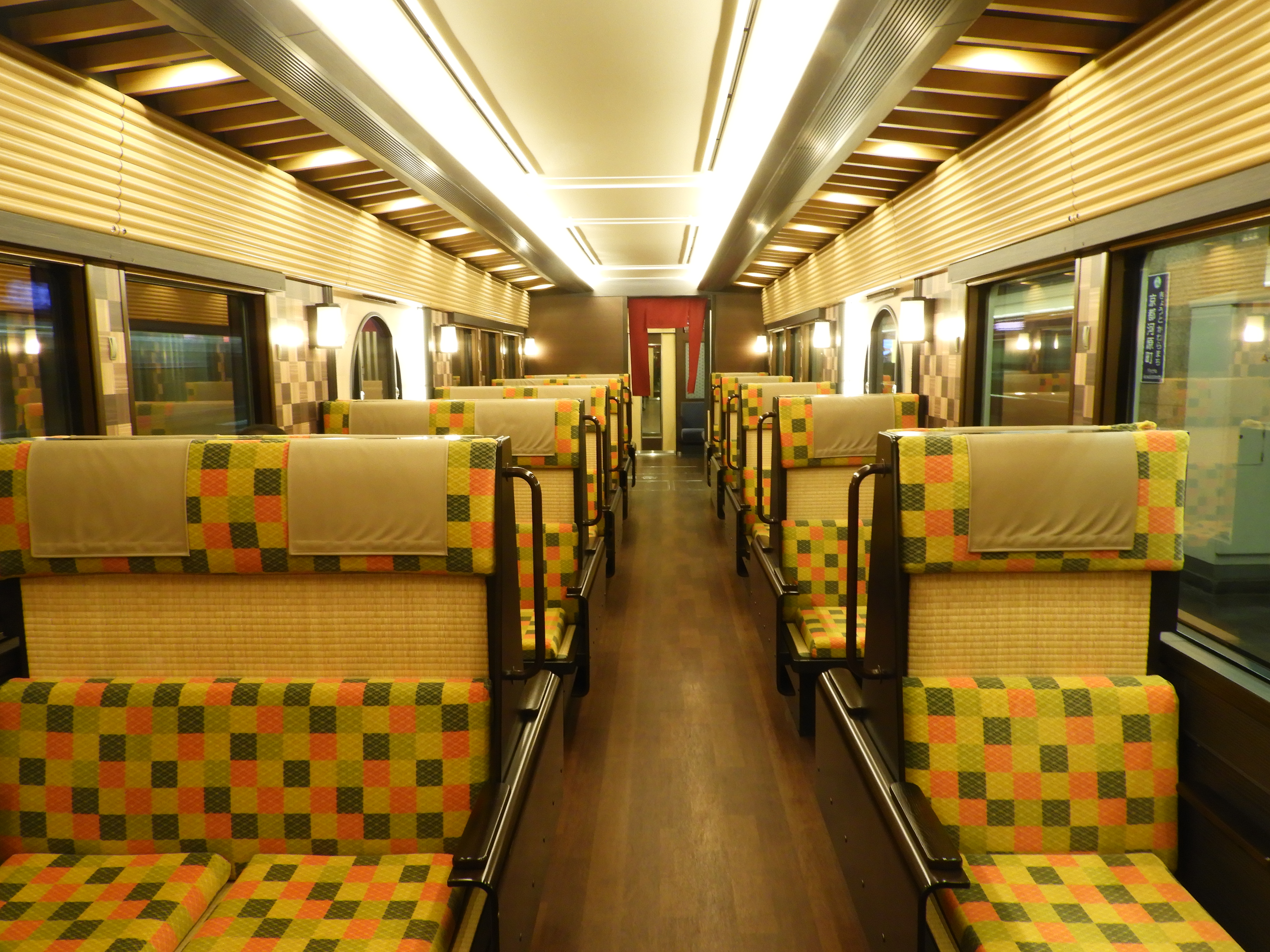
Interior of car 6

== Nose Electric Railway 7200 series ==
As of April 2020, two four-car sets operate for Nose Electric Railway as 7200 series.

Car No.	1	2	3	4
Designation	Mc	M'	T	Tc
Numbering	Mc 7000	T 7550	M 7600	Tc 7150

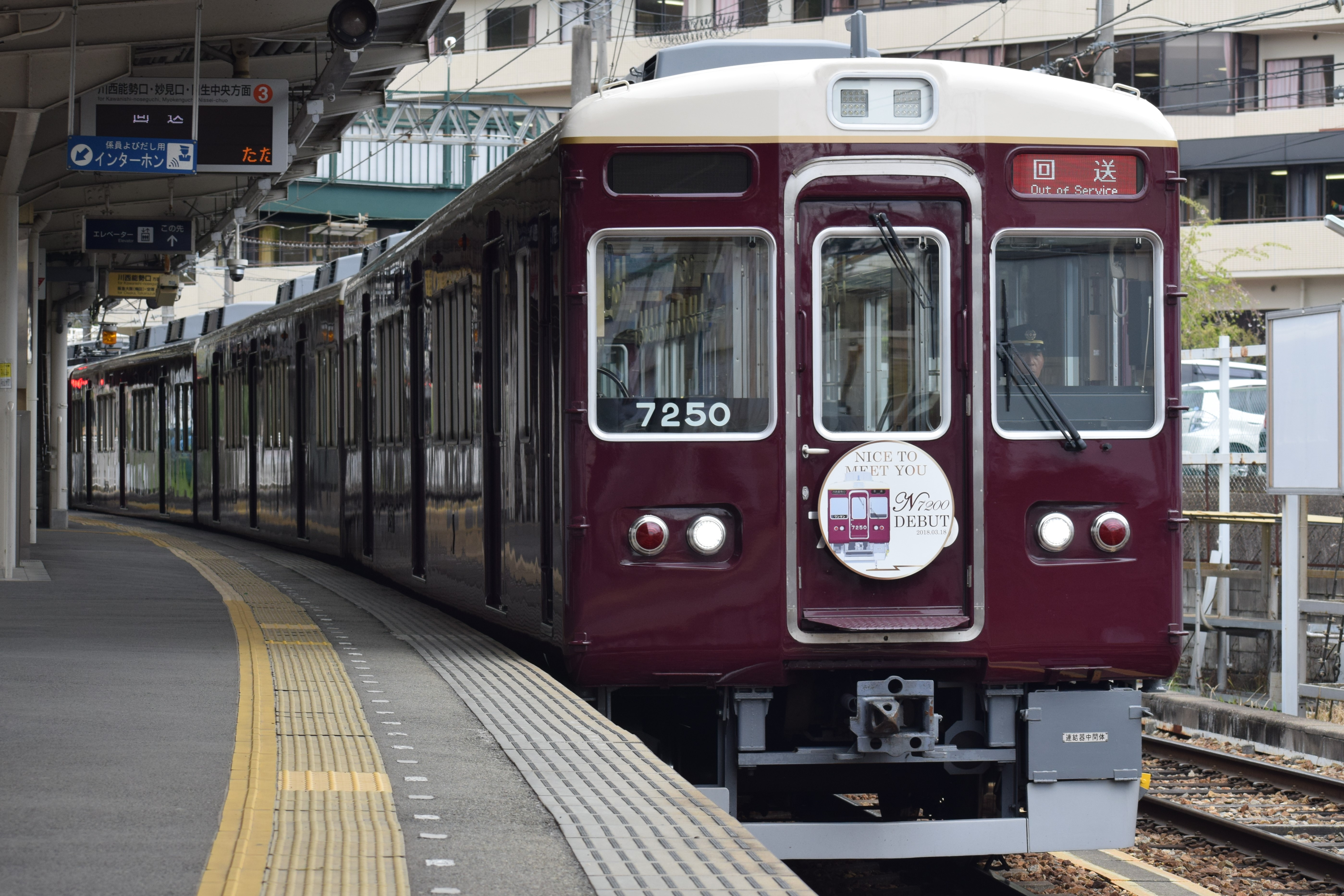
Four-car set 7200 in April 2018

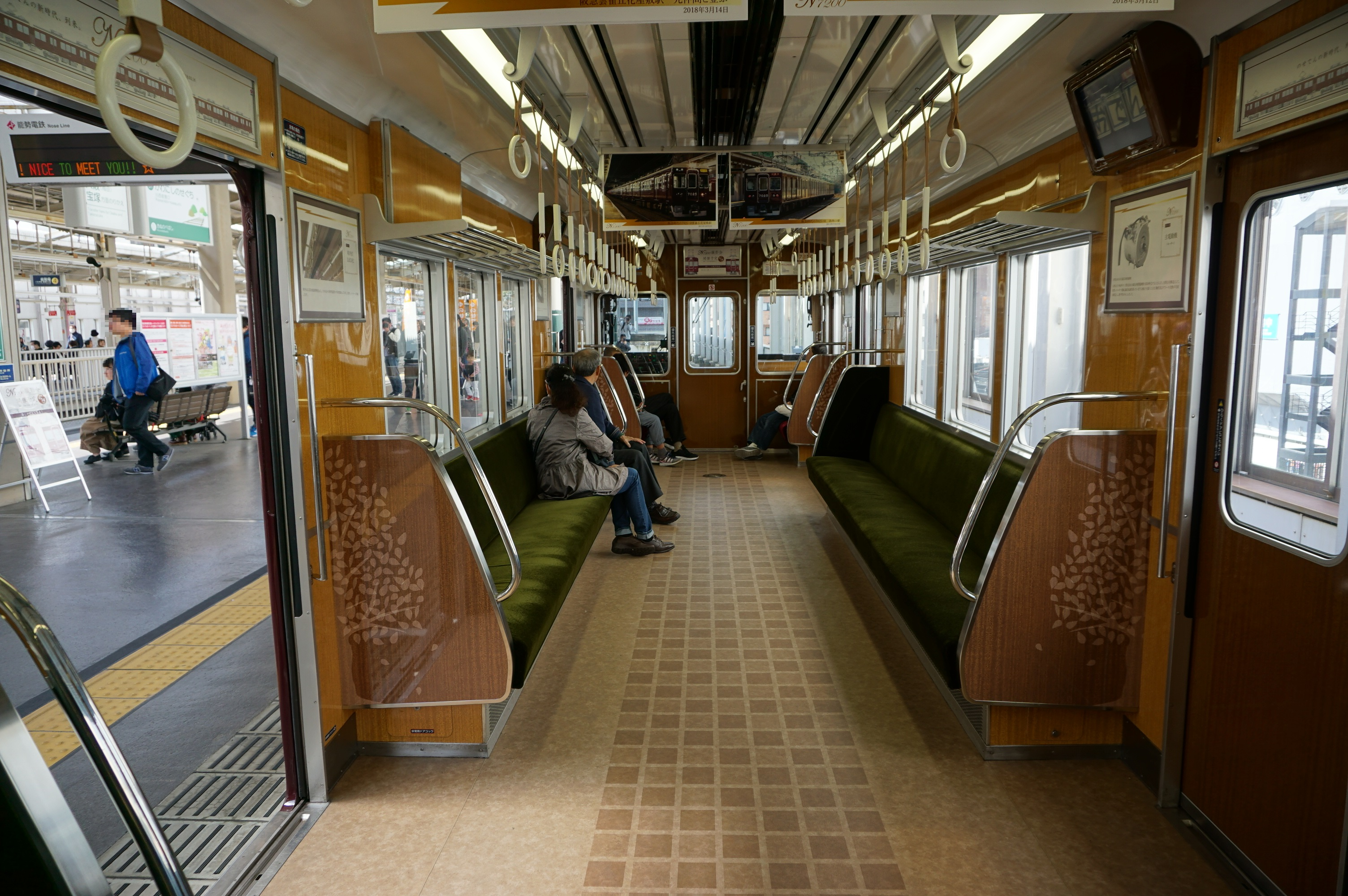
Inside of car 7250

== Gallery ==
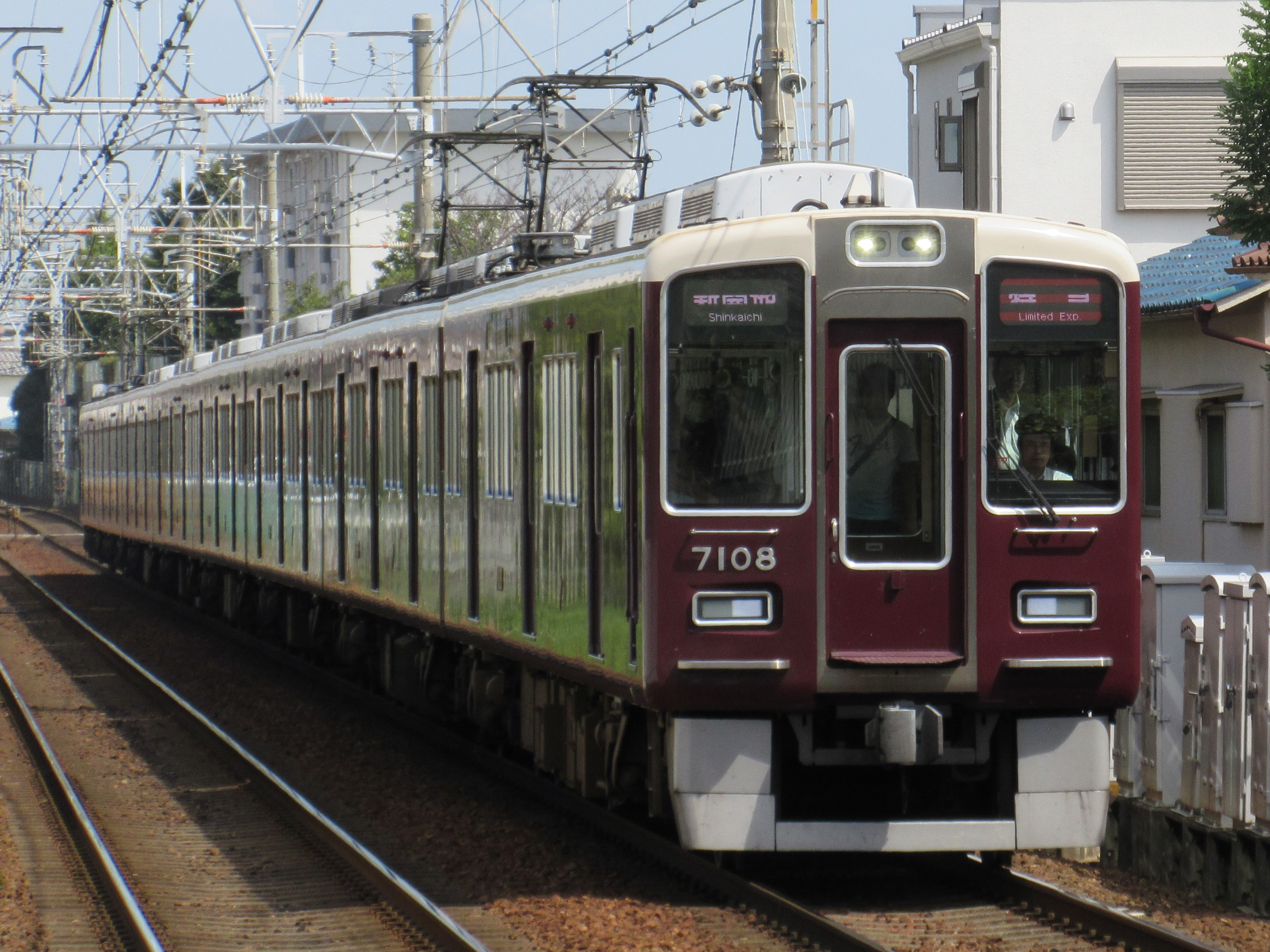
Lone 8-car second refurbished set 7008 featuring alternative front end design

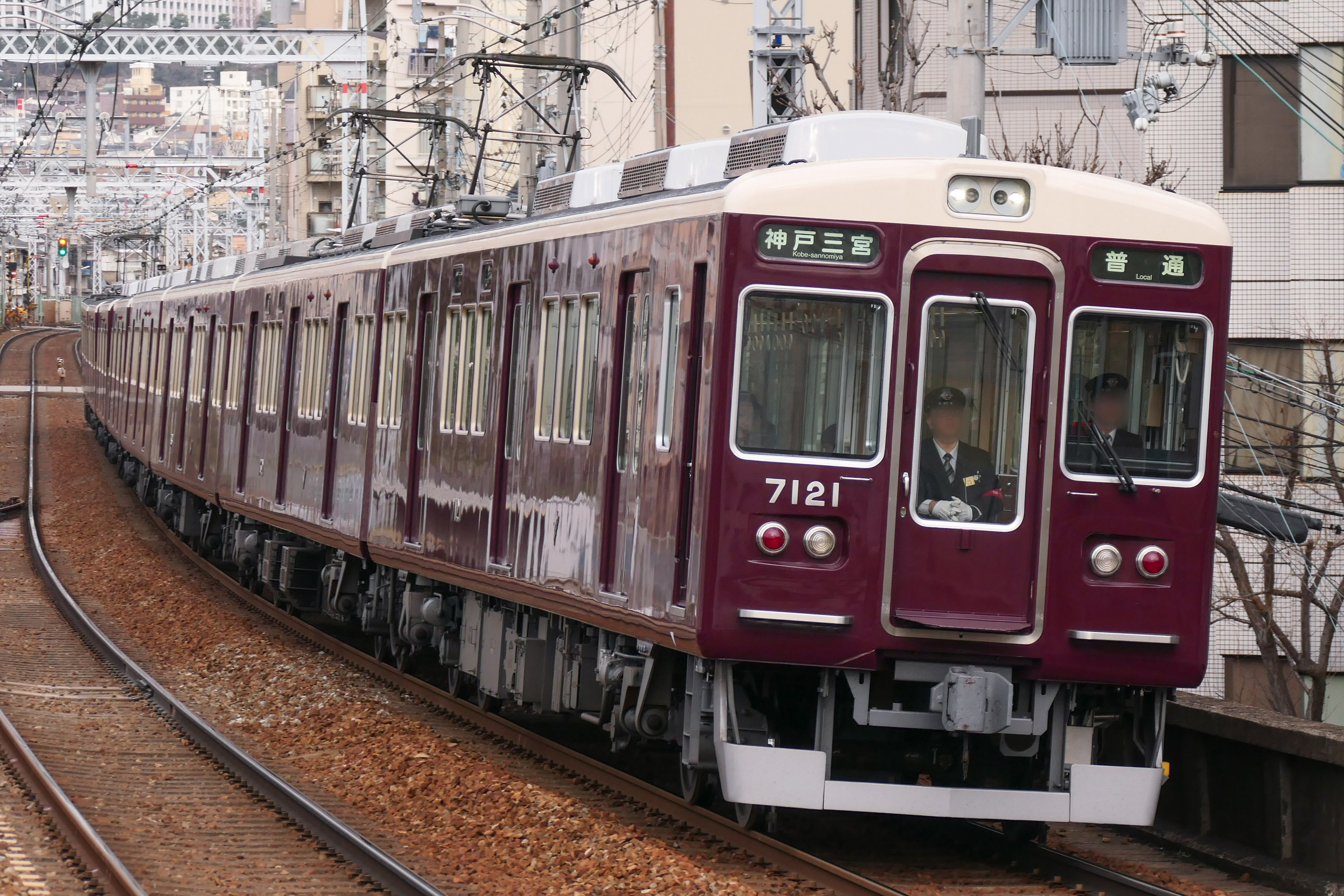
Lone 8-car VVVF refurbished set 7021 featuring alternative front end design

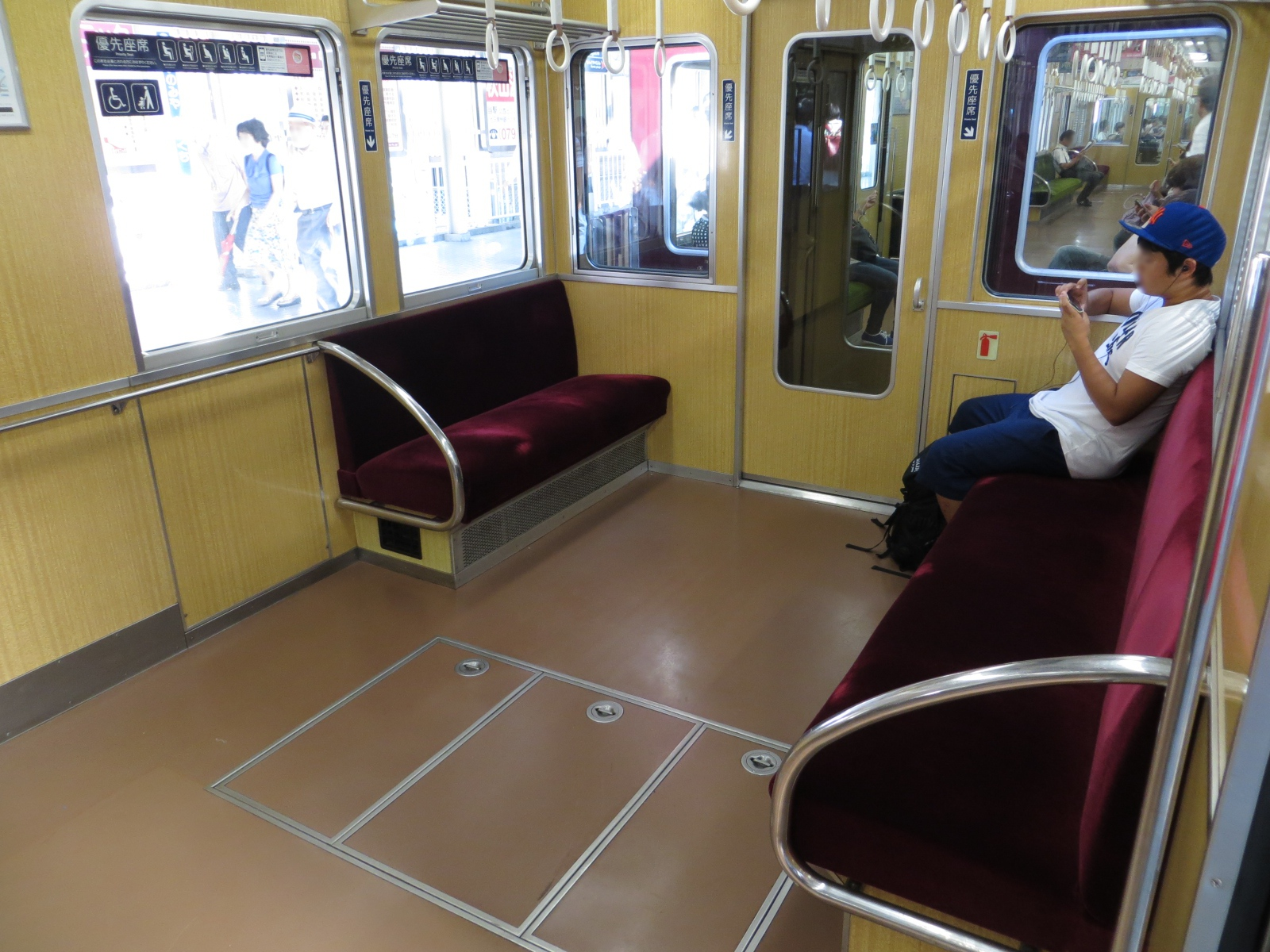
Interior of car 7503

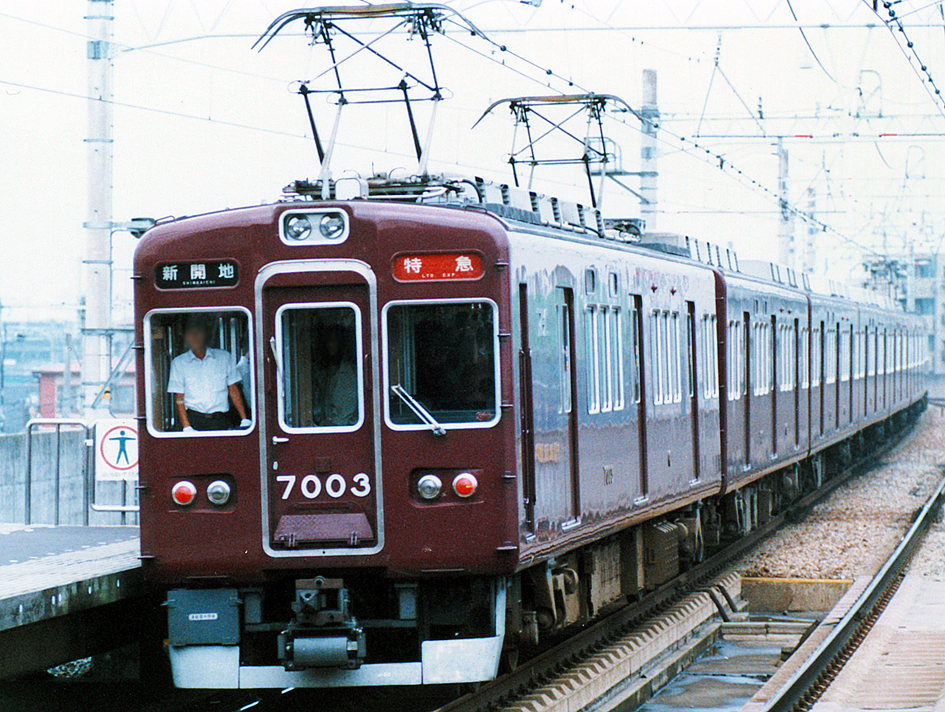
Eight-car set 7003 in 1988
