= 1963 Emperor's Cup final =

1963 Emperor's Cup Final
Waseda University	Hitachi
3	0
- Date: January 15, 1964
- Venue: Kobe Oji Stadium, Hyōgo

1963 Emperor's Cup Final was the 43rd final of the Emperor's Cup competition. The final was played at Kobe Oji Stadium in Hyōgo on January 15, 1964. Waseda University won the championship.

== Overview ==
Waseda University won the championship, by defeating Hitachi 3–0.

== Match details ==
January 15, 1964

Waseda University	3–0	Hitachi
? ?' ? ?' ? ?'

Kobe Oji Stadium

== See also ==
- 1963 Emperor's Cup
