= Kasuganomichi Station =

Kasuganomichi Station is the name of two train stations in Kobe, Japan:

- Kasuganomichi Station (Hankyu)
- Kasuganomichi Station (Hanshin)
