= Mount Nagamine =

Mountain in Hyōgo Prefecture, Japan

- 長峰山
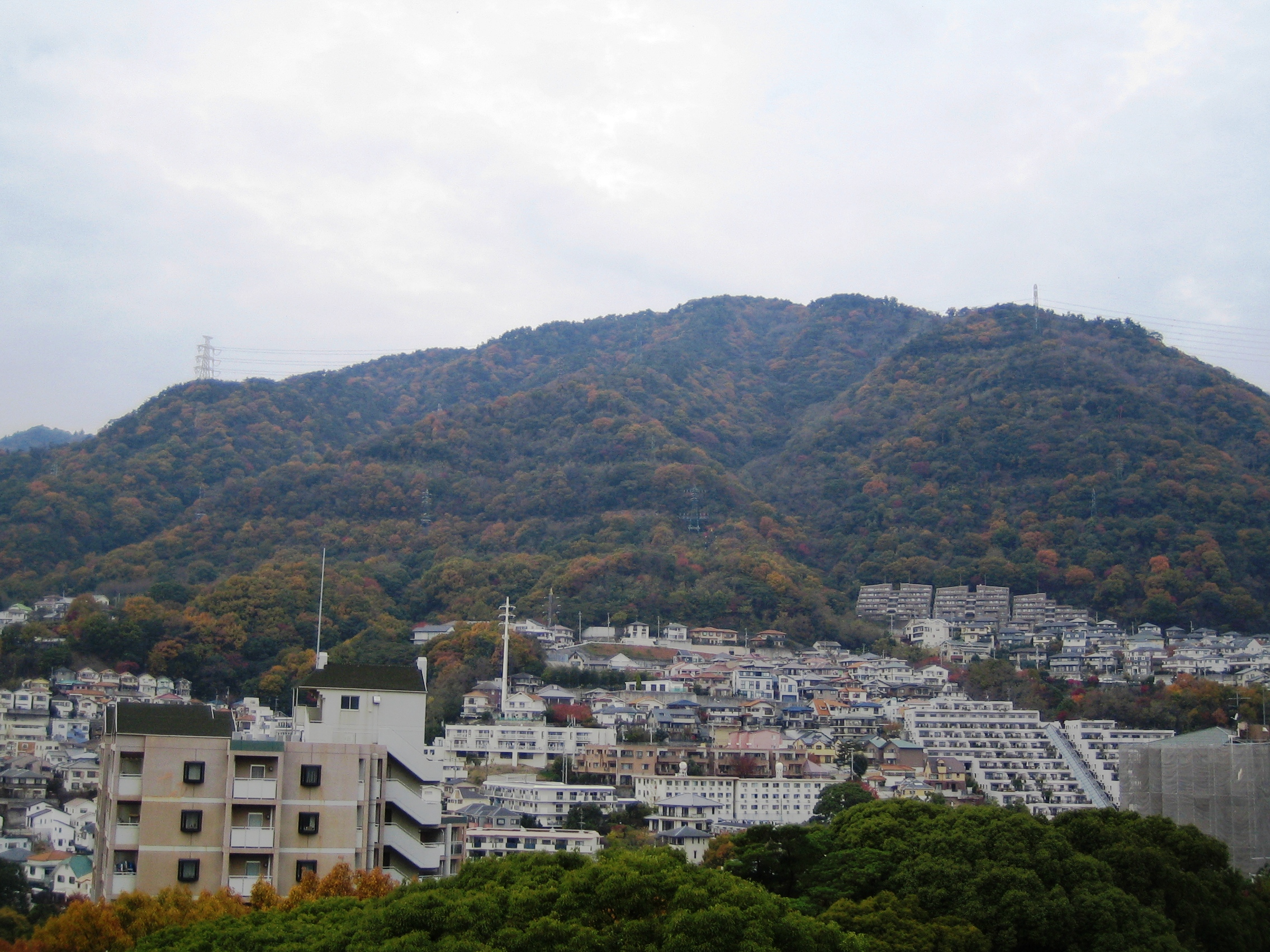
- Mount Nagamine from Kobe University

Highest point
- Elevation: 687.8 m (2,257 ft)
- Listing: List of mountains and hills of Japan by height
- Coordinates: 34°44′21″N 135°13′5″E

Naming
- English translation: Long ridge Mountain
- Language of name: Japanese
- Pronunciation: [neɡaminesaɴ]

Geography
- Location: Nada, Kobe, Hyōgo Prefecture, Japan
- Parent range: Rokko Mountains

Mount Nagamine (長峰山, Nagamine-san) is a 687.8 m (2,257 ft) mountain in Nada, Kobe, Hyōgo Prefecture, Japan. This mountain is one of the major mountains of Rokko Mountains. Mount Nagamine literally means, long ridge mountain.

== Outline ==
Mount Nagamine is on a ridge, which branches off a main ridge of Rokko Mountains. Because the ridge stretches to the south, toward the Osaka-Kobe metropolitan area, climbers can enjoy attractive views from the top. On the top of the mountain, there is a rock called ‘Tenguzuka’. This mountain belongs to the Setonaikai National Park.

== Route ==
This mountain has major two routes to the top. One is from Hankyu Rokko Station, and the other is from Ōji-kōen Station. It takes one and half hours from these stations to the top.

== Access ==
- Rokko Station of Hankyu Kobe Line
- Ōji-kōen Station of Hankyu Kobe Line

== Gallery ==
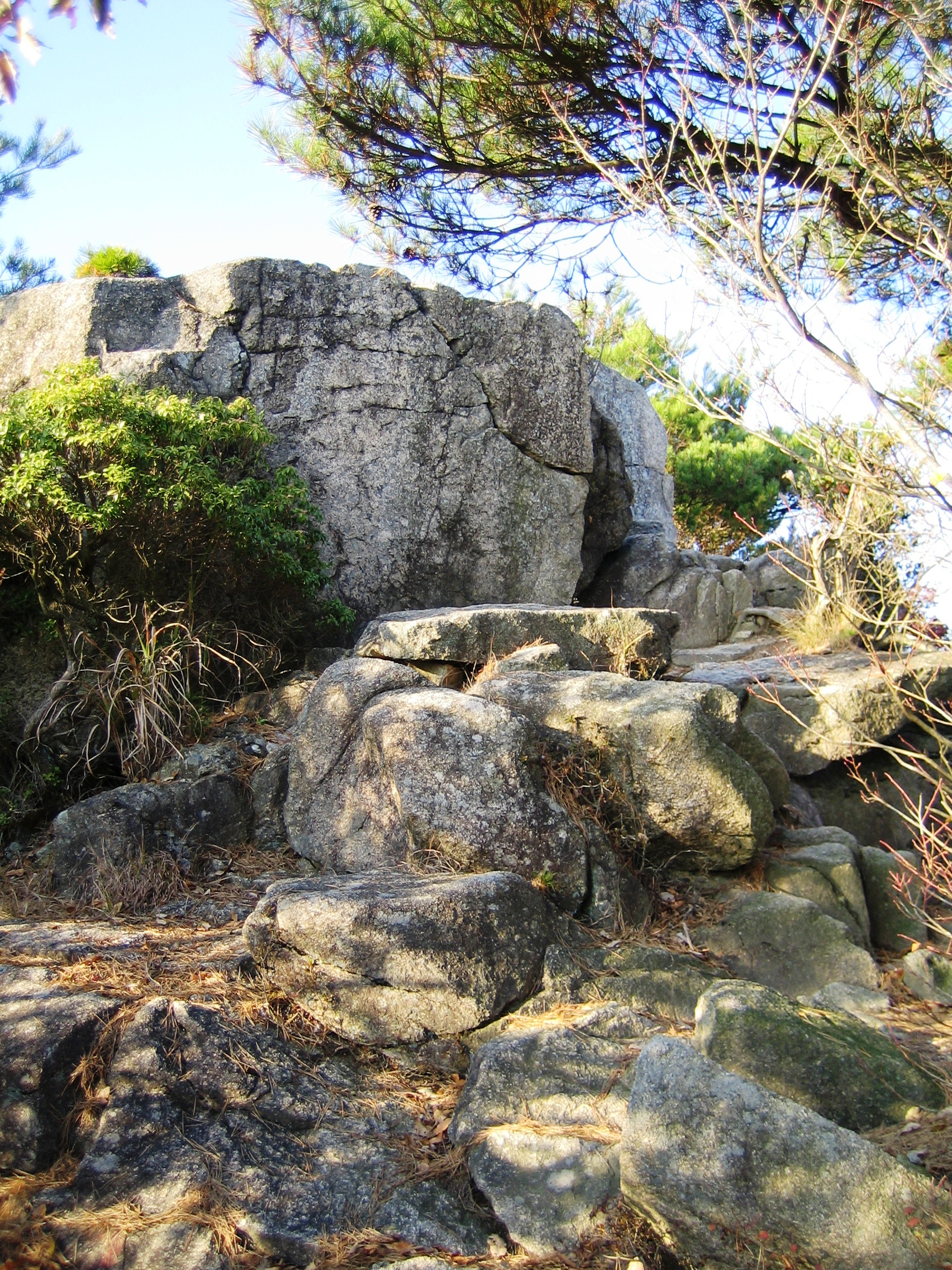
Tenguiwa Rock on the top of Mount Nagamine (11/2008)

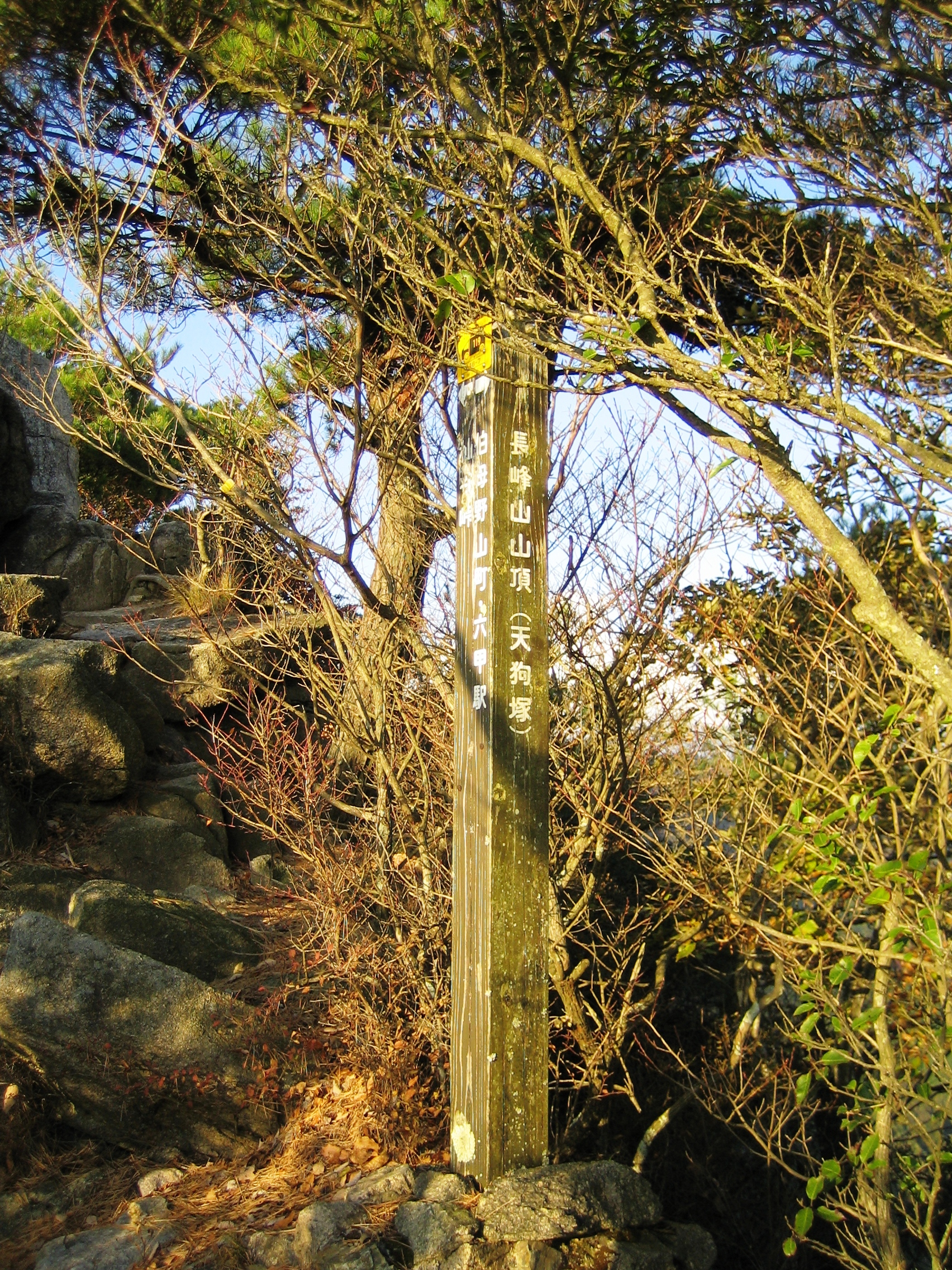
A view at the top of Mount Nagamine (11/2008)

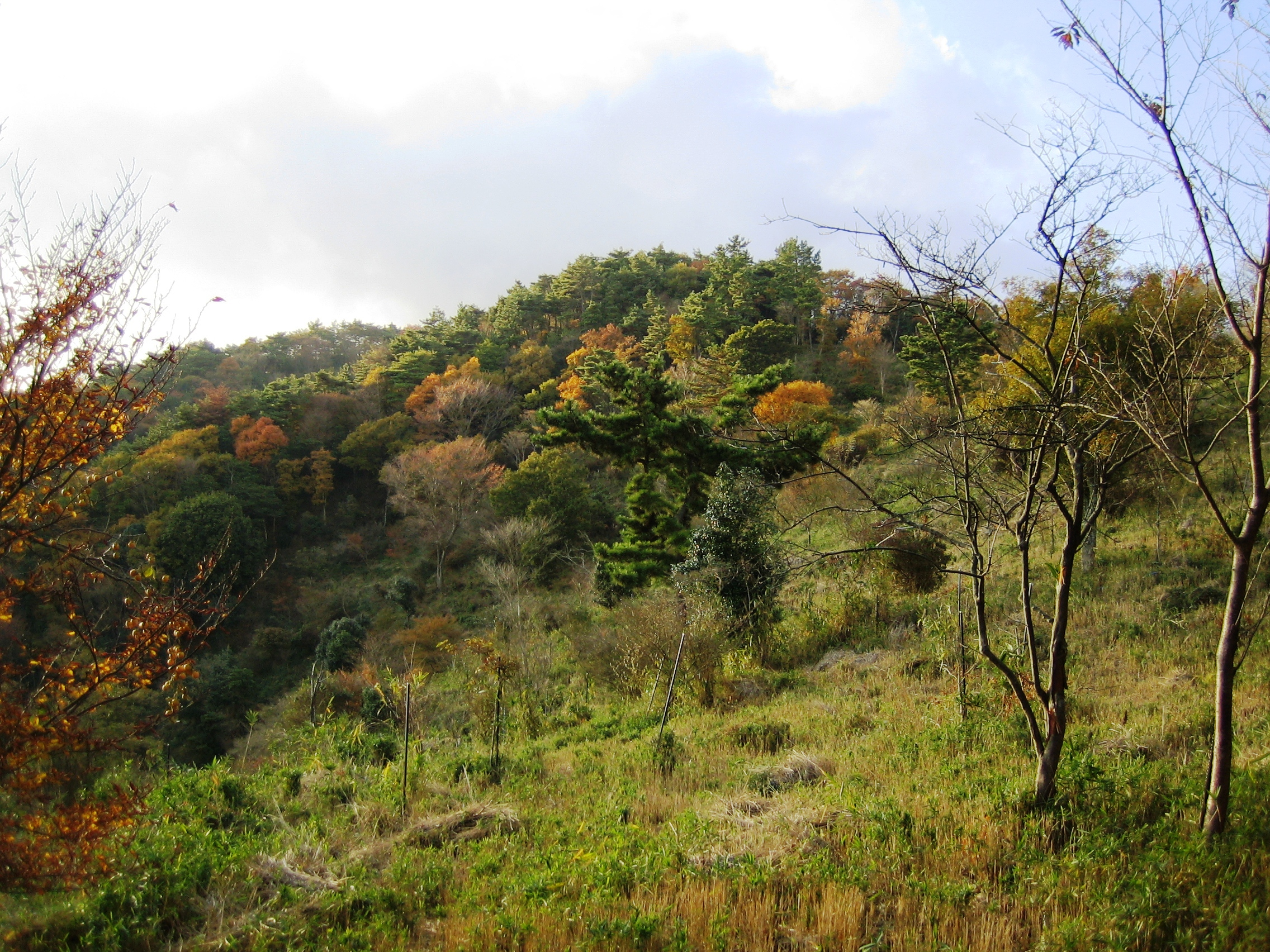
A view in the middle of Mount Nagamine (11/2008)

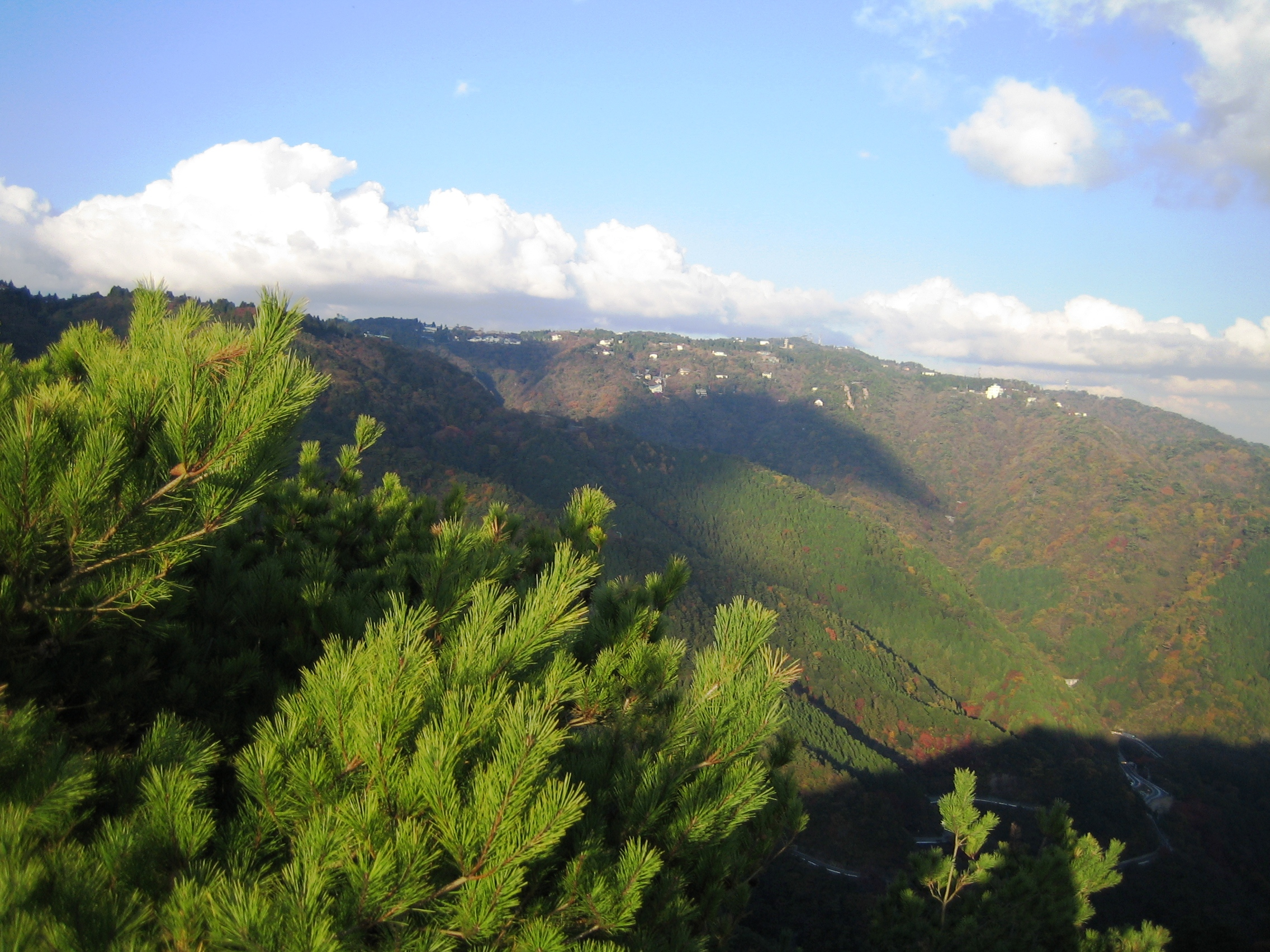
Mount Rokko from Mount Nagamine (11/2008)

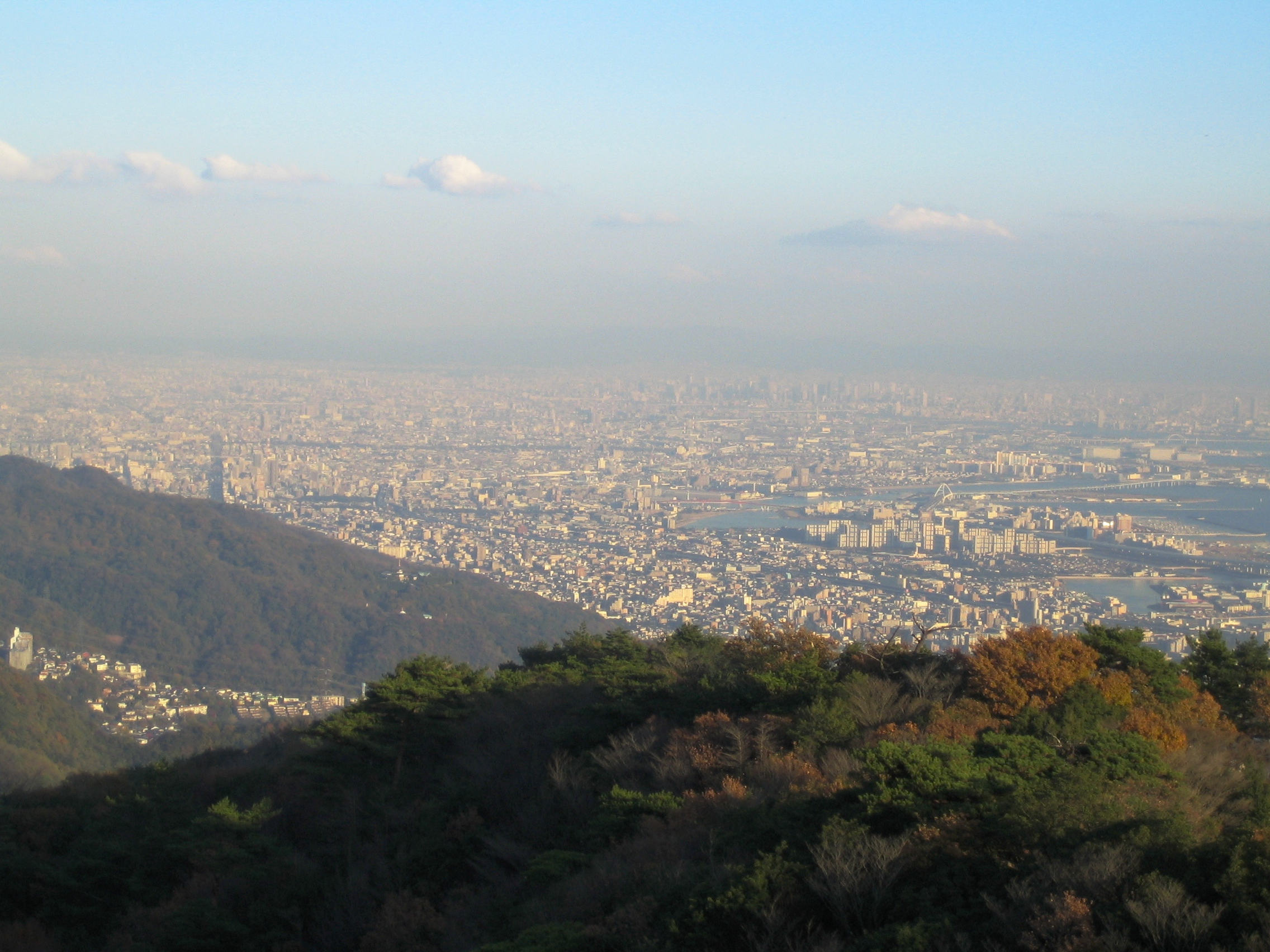
Osaka metropolitan area from the top of Mount Nagamine (11/2008)

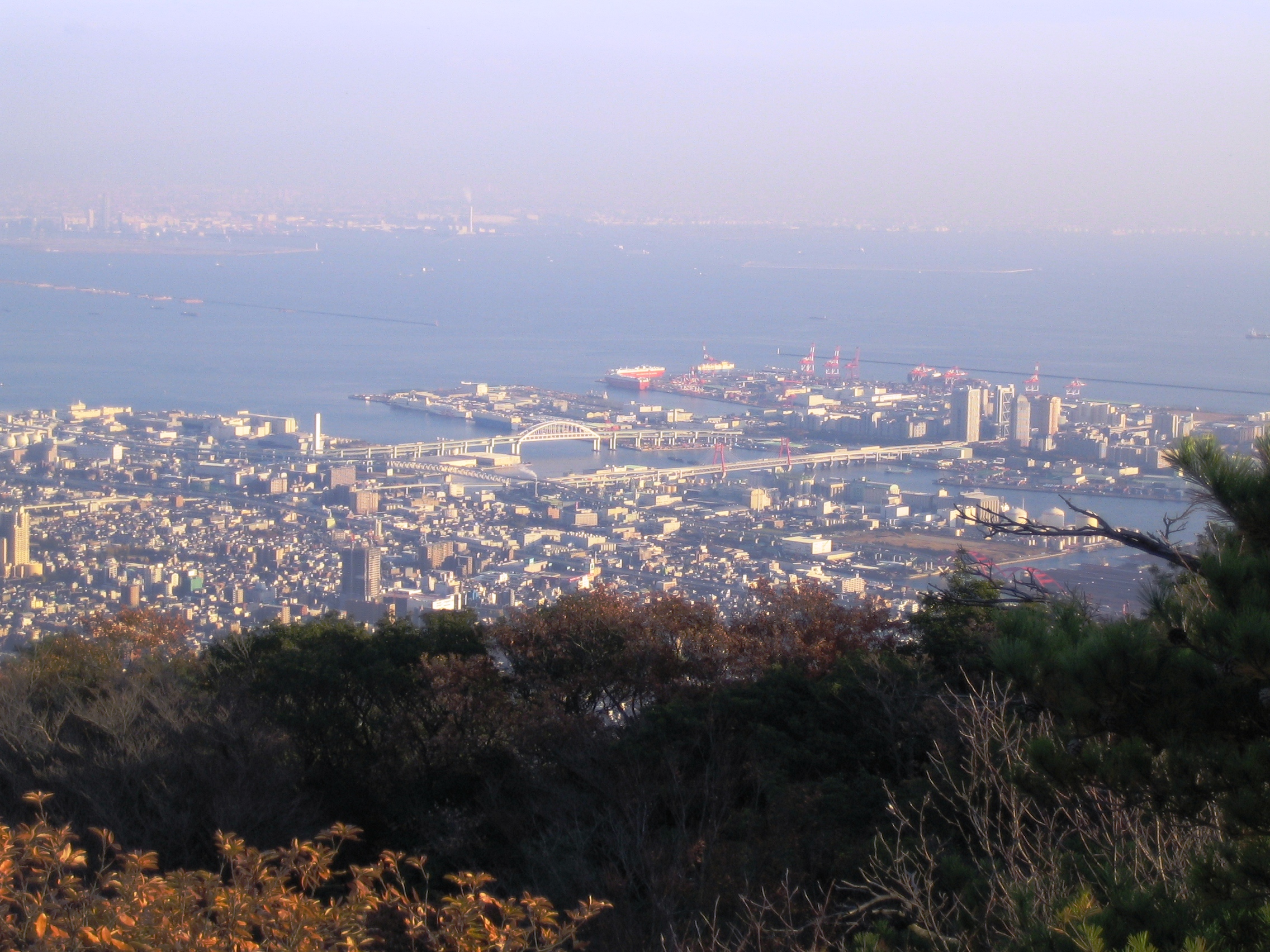
Rokko Island from the top of Mount Nagamine (11/2008)

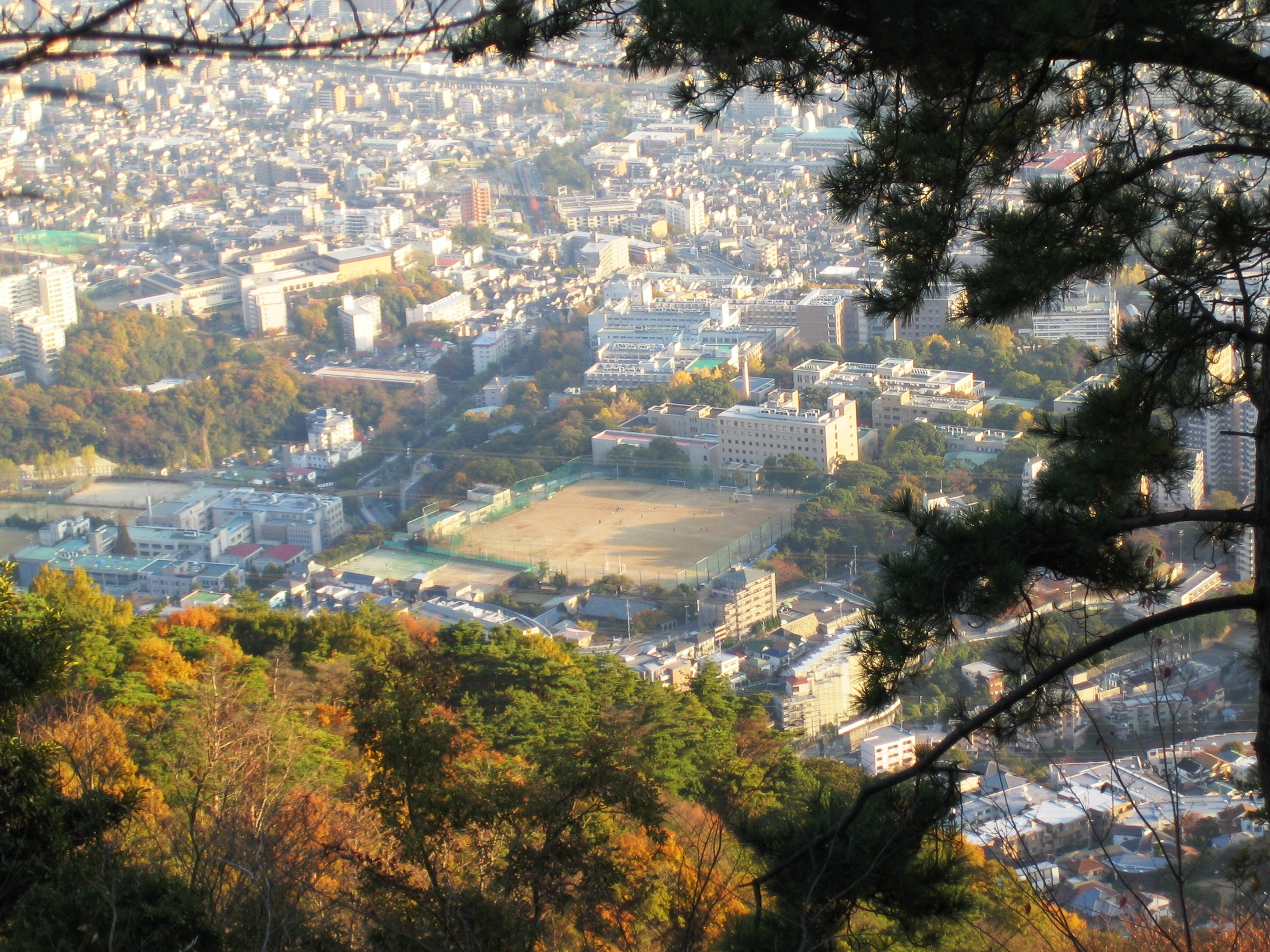
Kobe University from the top of Mount Nagamine (11/2008)

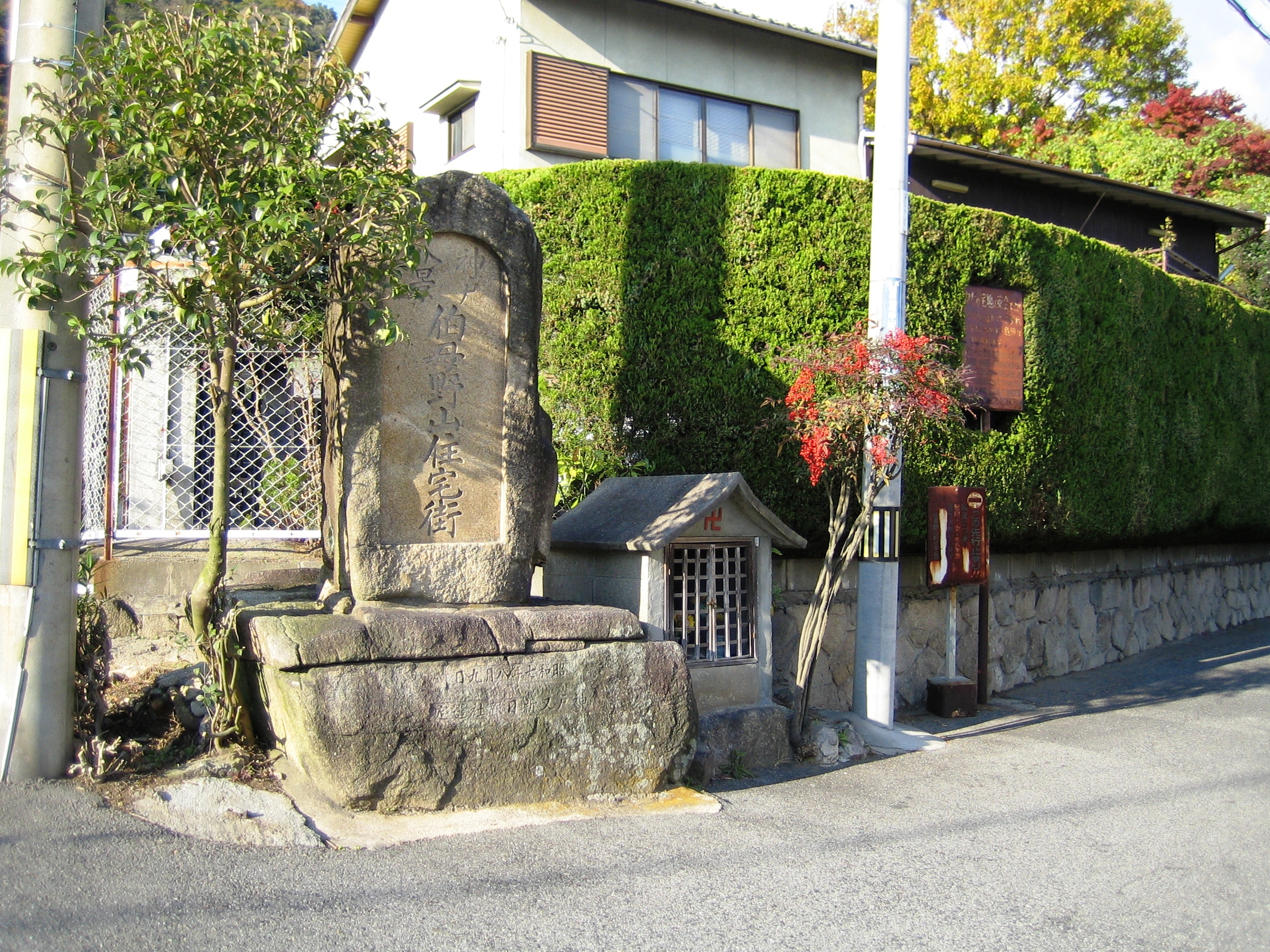
A view on the way to Mount Nagamine (11/2008)
