= Kobe City Museum of Literature =

Literary museum in Japan

Coordinates: 34°42′33″N 135°12′48″E

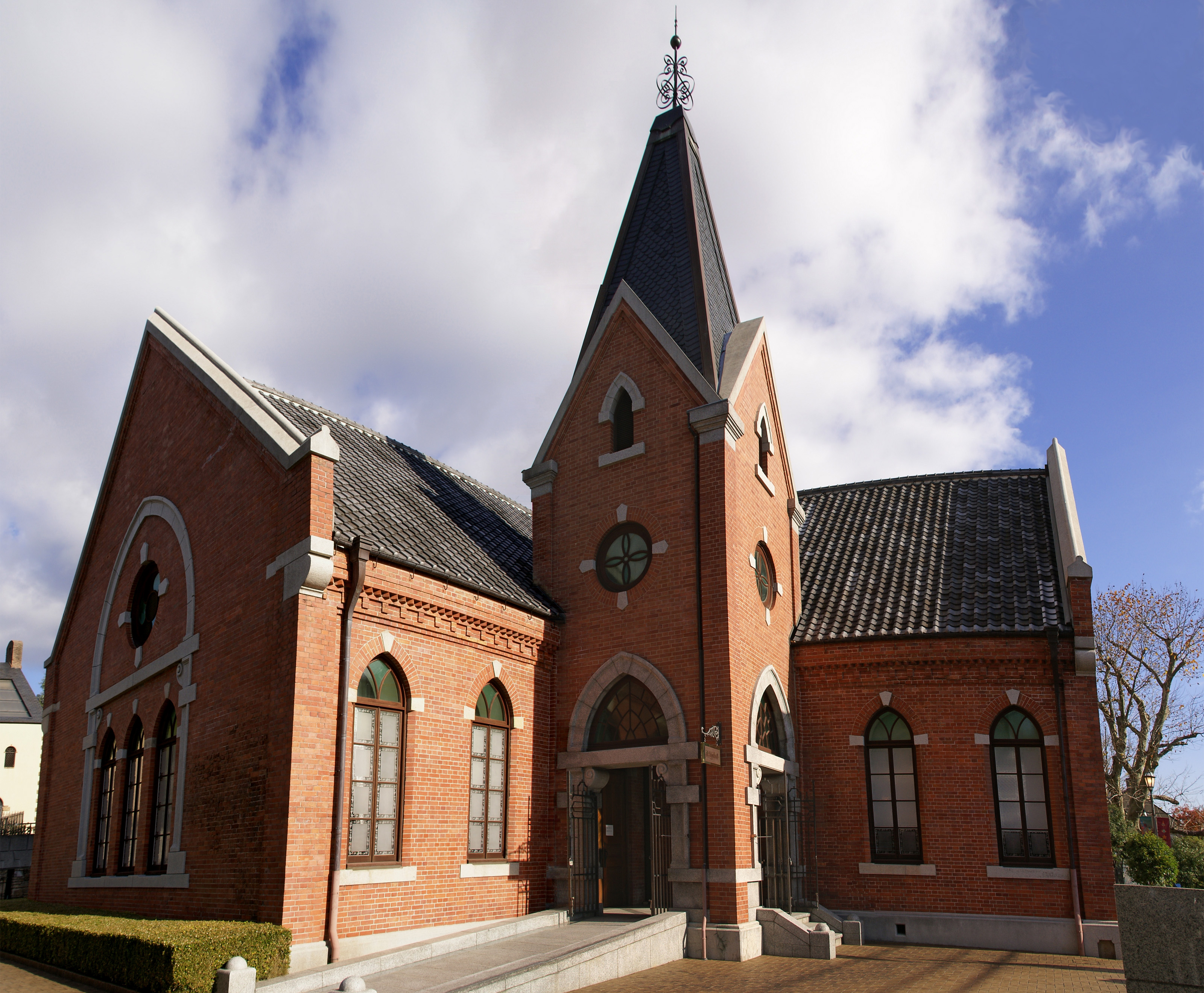
Branch Memorial Chapel, now Kobe City Museum of Literature

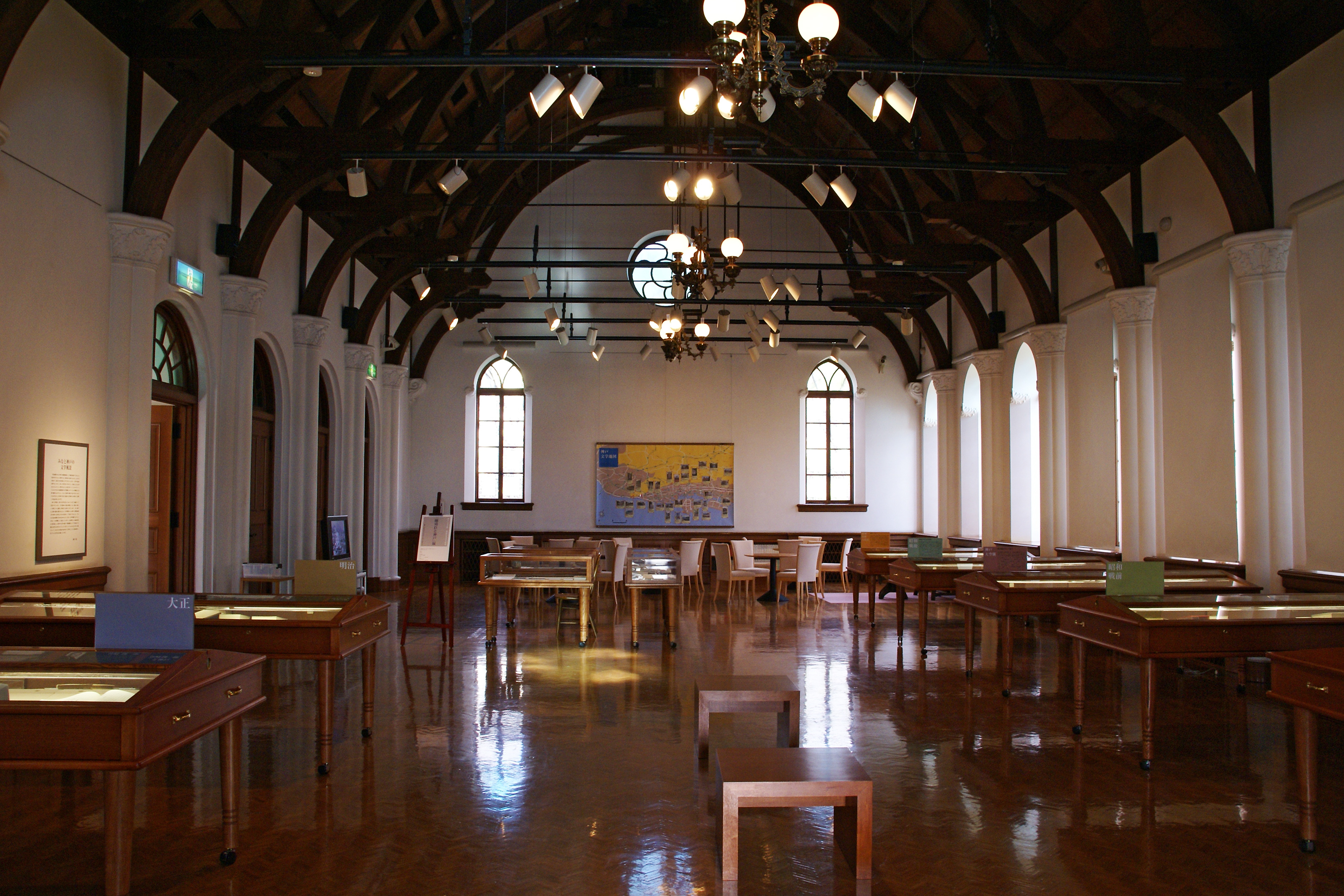
Inside the museum (chapel interior)

The Kobe City Museum of Literature (神戸文学館) is dedicated to the literary scene in Kobe, Hyōgo Prefecture, Japan in the Meiji, Taishō, Shōwa, and Heisei periods. The museum opened in 2006 in the former Branch Memorial Chapel of Kwansei Gakuin University, a Meiji period building largely funded by John Kerr Branch, a scion and financier from Richmond, Virginia.

It is next to Ōji Zoo and across the street from a contemporary art gallery dedicated to the illustrator Yokoo Tadanori.

== See also ==
- Branch House
- Japanese museums
