= Branch House =

Historic house in Virginia, United States

- U.S. National Register of Historic Places
- U.S. National Historic Landmark District – Contributing property
- Virginia Landmarks Register
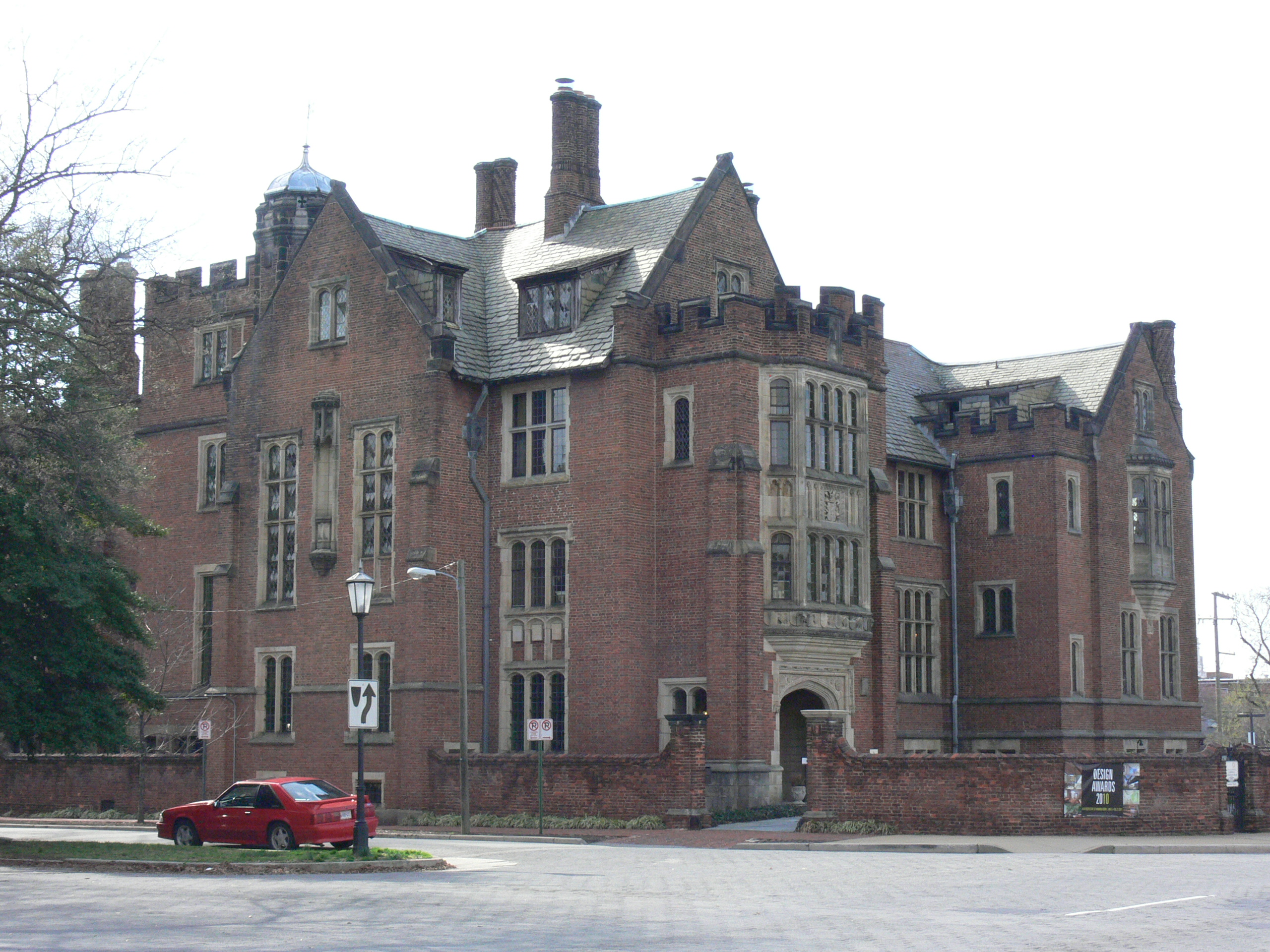
- Location: 2501 Monument Avenue, Richmond, Virginia, United States
- Coordinates: 37°33′29″N 77°28′7″W
- Built: 1916–1919
- Architect: John Russell Pope with Otto R. Eggers
- Architectural style: Tudor Revival, Jacobean Revival
- Part of: Monument Avenue Historic District (ID70000883)
- NRHP reference No.: 84003569
- VLR No.: 127-0246

Significant dates
- Added to NRHP: February 23, 1984
- Designated VLR: January 17, 1984

Branch House in Richmond, Virginia, was designed in 1916 by the firm of John Russell Pope as a private residence of financier John Kerr Branch and his wife Beulah Gould Branch.

The house lies within Richmond's Monument Avenue Historic District, which was listed on the National Register of Historic Places in 1967. Branch House itself was listed on the National Register of Historic Places in 1984. The district's status was extended in 1989 and subsequently upgraded to a National Historic Landmark in 1997.

After a Branch family heir gifted the home to a local charity in the 1950s, the house changed ownership several times until it was purchased in 2003 by the Virginia Architecture Foundation (formerly the Virginia Center for Architecture Foundation) in 2005 it reopened as the headquarters of its successor, the Virginia Center for Architecture (VCA) with offices for the Virginia Society of the American Institute of Architects (VSAIA), VCA moved from the Branch House in 2015. Since 2015, the Branch House has been the home of The Branch Museum of Architecture and Design (www.branchmuseum.org).

== Historical significance ==
After designing Branch House, the firm of John Russell Pope (1874–1937) became widely known for designing the National Archives and Records Administration building (1935), the Jefferson Memorial (1943) and the West Building of the National Gallery of Art (1941) in Washington, DC. Pope's partner, Otto R. Eggers (1882–1964), completed those commissions after Pope's death in 1937, and subsequently designed prominent projects including the interior of the SS United States (1952) and the Morehead Planetarium at the University of North Carolina at Chapel Hill.

Branch House was thus elevated to the National Register because it was designed by one of the country's prominent architectural firms during the early 20th century; because it is the only example of the firm's domestic work in Virginia; and because it is the only example of the firm's Tudor-Jacobean Revival residences in which the interiors have survived intact. In addition, the house is located within a historic district of cultural significance and is the largest house in the city of Richmond.

Branch House accurately reflects a particular period of American history, in the early decades of the twentieth century, when English architectural styles were fashionable among wealthy industrialists and financiers. The client was also scion to a distinguished Virginia family and had assembled a substantial collection of Renaissance artifacts.

== Design ==
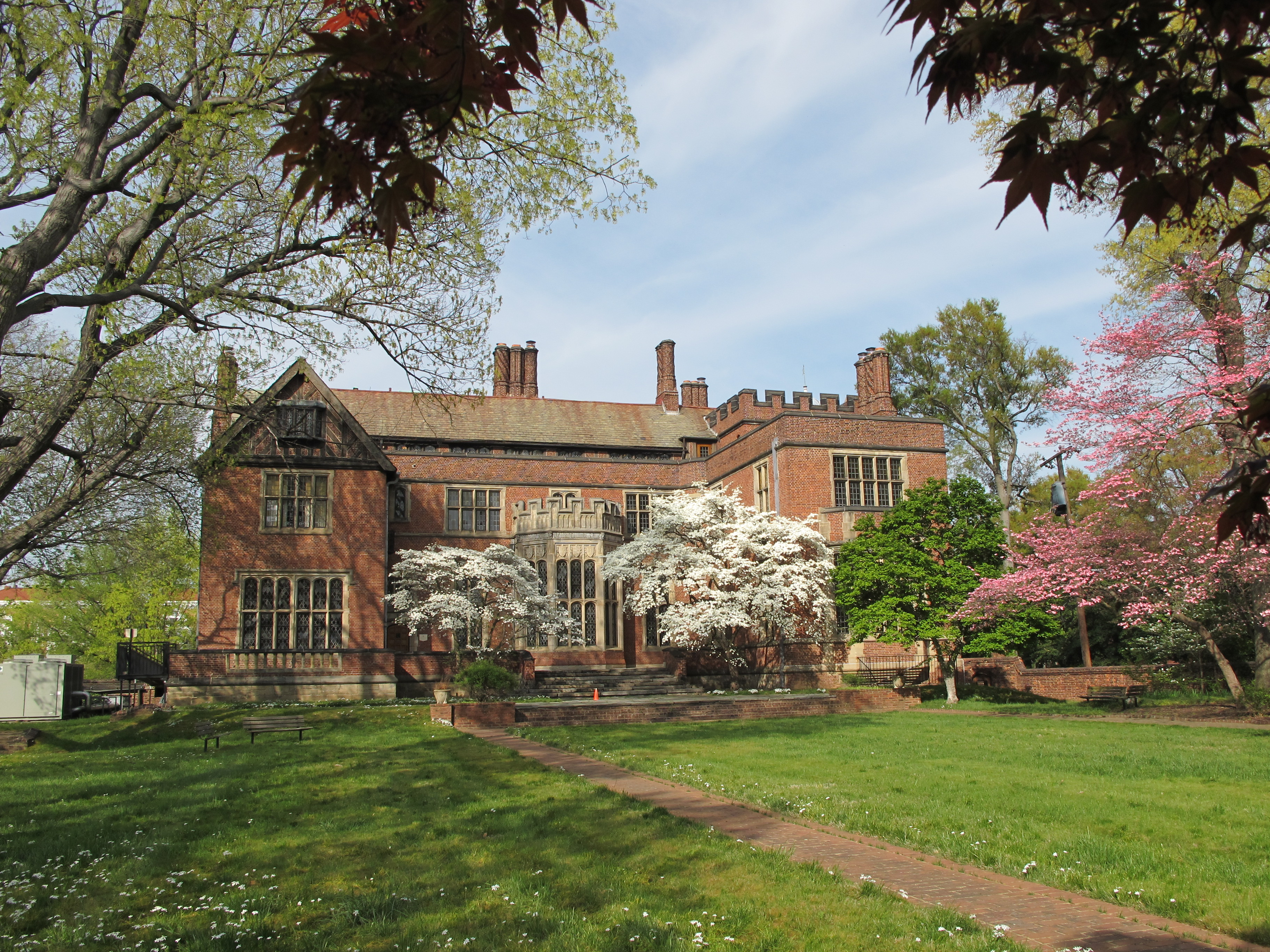
Branch House

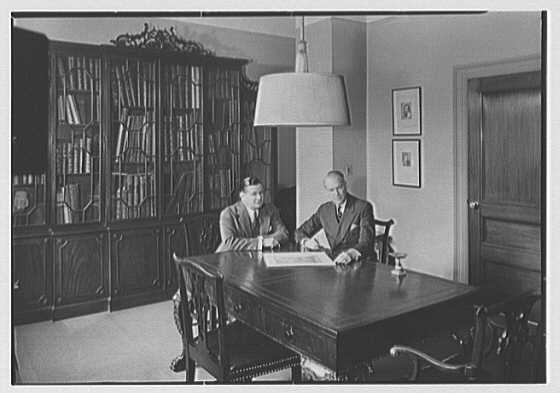
Eggers and Higgins in their New York City offices in 1941

After receiving the gift of half a city block from his father, John Kerr and Beulah Branch commissioned the firm of John Russell Pope for the design. The site was adjacent to the colonnaded memorial to Jefferson Davis at 2501 Monument Avenue at Davis Street, in what is now the Monument Avenue Historic District, itself within Richmond's Fan district. Notably, the site is on axis with the Broad Street Station to the north, possibly related to John Kerr Branch's professional associations with the railroad.

=== Overall design ===
According to the 1984 application to the National Register of Historic Places, Pope himself had limited involvement in the project and never visited the building. The architectural construction drawings were dated August 18, 1916, and signed by his business partner, architect Otto R. Eggers. Floor plans included 28 major rooms: public halls, galleries, private suites, servants' quarters, a ballroom, and storage rooms designated specifically for carpets, china, paintings – and suits of armour.

The overall size of the house has been reported as ranging from 27,000 to 33,000 sq ft. It is roughly three times the size of its neighbors on Monument Avenue.

Branch House features a central portion flanked by two projecting pavilions. The roof is double-pitched with parapets and castellation (or crenelations), creating numerous complexities and hidden flat areas. The eastern pavilion has a three-story castellated bay. The 1984 application to the National Register of Historic Places described the home's relationship to the street as "extremely awkward." Pope's office had made provision for a garage on Park Avenue, but a two-door garage was not added until the 1920s, at the west end of the building.

Although from the outside the house appears to have three storeys, and although the interior is logically laid out, the interior is organized on numerous different levels — variously reported as ranging from 11 levels to as many as 19.

=== Style and inspiration ===
The historic style of Branch House has been variously reported as Tudor, Tudor Revival, Tudor-Jacobean or Domestic Tudor. The 1984 application to the National Register of Historic Places noted that the design "incorporated salient features from several 16th-century English country houses to form a convincingly correct assemblage of design elements," adding that "to maintain the illusion of age, the architect had the building materials distressed and aged to add patina to the image of power and pedigree" and furthermore that "barons of American industry, finance, and culture, such as Branch, appropriated the traditions of English domestic architecture as a way of asserting a noble lineage for their class."

John Russell Pope had traveled extensively and the firm based the design for Branch House on a large 16th-century country house in Warwickshire, England known as Compton Wynyates, which features numerous exterior details also found at Branch House including linenfold paneling inside and exterior half-timbering and brick diapering, along with oriel and casement windows with leaded glass. Pope's office primarily borrowed details and design elements from Compton Wynyates, which wraps around a large interior courtyard, sits on the interior of a large country parcel, and is highly expansive and asymmetrical. Branch House, by contrast, includes no courtyard, sits adjacent to a street corner on an urban parcel and is largely compact and more symmetrical.

=== Construction and details ===
Exterior features of Branch House include its perimeter wall of brick construction, wall materials of weathered brick combined with distressed and patinized briarcliff sandstone, sculpted stone motifs, sandstone door and window surrounds, chimney pots, brickwork with diamond diapering, leaded glass, carved-stone heraldry, oriel windows with cul-de-lampe (corbeling resembling the conical bottom of ancient lamps), bargeboards resembling those of Compton Wynyates, inscriptions at the window heads referring to the Branch family's arrival in Virginia during the 17th century, a tower reminiscent of that at Hampton Court Palace, and three characteristically Tudor twisted brick chimneys that resemble those found in Tudor pattern books of the period.

The interior features vaulted ceilings, curvilinear tracery featuring heraldic symbols, heavily decorated pargeted Tudor-style plaster molding, and modern features including fireproof concrete floors and a redundant boiler in case the primary boiler failed. Utilizing artifacts from the Branches' personal Renaissance collection, the house incorporated an Italian door and a carved wood gallery screen (or minstrel screen) from England. Until Beulah Gould Branch's death, almost every wall surface in the home's primary rooms was covered with the couple's collection of tapestries and textiles.

== The Branch Family ==
John Kerr Branch was born in Danville, Virginia, to Mary Louise Merritt Kerr and John Patteson Branch, both originally of Petersburg, Virginia. The elder Branch was a noted Richmond banker, investor, financier and philanthropist. On his death in 1915, The New York Times called him the "Nestor of Richmond Bankers."

John Kerr Branch grew up in Richmond and attended the McGuire School, subsequently studying in Paris and Germany (1882–1884). At age 21, he began clerking with his father's firm, Thomas Branch & Company. Branch invested successfully in real estate and railroads; ultimately inherited his family's banking fortune; and became director of the Continental Insurance Company of New York (chiefly involved with Southern cotton mills and railroads) and the Petersburg Savings and Insurance Company. He became President of Merchants National Bank of Richmond (having founded the bank in 1871); President of Thomas Branch and Company, later Branch & Company, (1837–1976); and President of Bankers and Brokers, Richmond. He was a member of the New York Stock Exchange and in addition to numerous Richmond clubs, also a member of the New York Yacht Club and the Downtown Association of New York.

Branch met Beulah Frances Gould in Germany on a retreat in the Black Forest. Both Quakers, they married in 1886 at the Gould family's rural estate, Elmwood, at Quaker Hill, Pawling, New York, and subsequently had three children: John Akin (born 1887), Zayde Bancroft Branch (born 1891), and Louise Branch (born 1900).

Branch had already begun a career as an avid collector at age 19, when he acquired two 16th-century chairs. He and his wife Beulah later became widely known as collectors of Italian Renaissance paintings, furniture, tapestries, woodwork and armour. For the design of their new home, they began working with the firm of John Russell Pope in 1914, well before the firm's noted commissions in Washington, D.C. At the time when the Branches commissioned the home, Pope's firm had just won the competition to design Richmond's Broad Street Train Station, just two blocks to the north on land owned by Branch's father near Monument Avenue's Jefferson Davis memorial. The elder Branch gifted an entire city block to his son and daughter on condition that they build their homes there. John Kerr built on one half of the block, and construction was complete in 1919 at a cost of $160,000, roughly the equivalent of $19 million in 2010.

The Branches lived "seasonally," maintaining Elmwood, their farm estate at Quaker Hill, Pawling, New York and later also acquiring a 15th-century Italian Renaissance villa near Florence (Villa Marsilio Ficino in Fiesole). Branch House was their winter home.

John Kerr Branch died in Fiesole on July 1, 1930, at age 65 of bronchitis, and was buried in Richmond. Beulah Gould Branch continued to live in the home until her death in 1952. Their daughter, Zayde Branch Rennolds (Mrs. Edmond Addison Rennolds Sr.) subsequently gifted the home to a Richmond charity. A decade later, in the late 1960s, their granddaughter Zayde Rennolds Dotts (Mrs. Walter Dotts Jr.) created the Monument Avenue Preservation Society to protect the surroundings of the home her grandparents had commissioned.

== Ownership succession and recent history ==
In 1953, Branch House was given by Zayde Branch Rennolds (Mrs. Edmund Addison Rennolds Sr.), the daughter of Beulah and John Kerr Branch, to the Richmond Community Chest, which subsequently became the United Givers Fund, in turn becoming the Richmond office of the United Way. After Beulah Gould Branch's death and during the years 1957–1975, the house became known as the Branch Memorial House.

By 1966, the house was occupied by a group of nine charities, including the United Way and the American Cancer Society. As the headquarters for the United Way of Greater Richmond, Branch House hosted numerous social events, meetings, and community activities, including the summer concert series of the Richmond Pops Band.

In 1982, Robert E. Pogue of Richmond and his wife Janice W. Pogue of Richmond bought the house and set up the offices of Pogue & Associates, Inc., an insurance agency representing Northwestern Mutual. The Pogues subsequently donated a preservation easement to the Virginia Department of Historic Resources. In exchange for tax benefits, the easement stipulated that "no major changes (could) be made to the exterior or interior, in perpetuity." In December 1983, the Pogues successfully applied to list Branch House on the National Register of Historic Places. During its use by the Pogues and Northwestern Mutual, the house was extensively rehabilitated and again made available for public events.

By 1990, the insurance agency had outgrown the house and put it up for sale for an asking price of 2.5 million.

In 2003, the Virginia Center for Architecture Foundation (VCAF), precursor to the Virginia Center for Architecture (VCA), purchased the landmark for $2 million, subsequently verifying historic preservation tax credits, coordinating work with the Virginia Department of Historic Resources, and undertaking a $2 million renovation. The renovation repaired flat sections of the complex roof system, repaired the leaded-glass casement windows, removed paint from its interior stonework, modernized the HVAC systems and brought the facility into compliance with the accessibility requirements of the Americans with Disabilities Act.

On April 1, 2005, the facility opened as a museum, incorporating galleries, shops and offices. Two large rooms, one a long gallery along the northern wall of the house and another the former living room, provide exhibit space. Until 2015, the Branch House accommodated the offices of the Virginia Society of the American Institute of Architects (VSAIA) and the Virginia Center for Architecture (VCA). Since 2015, the Branch House has been the home of The Branch Museum of Design (www.branchmuseum.org), which presents changing exhibits and programs, along with the annual Mad Hatter Art & Design Auction.

== See also ==
- Kobe City Museum of Literature, funded by John Kerr and Beulah Gould Branch
