= Kobe Oji Zoo =

Zoo in Kobe, Japan

Ōji Zoo
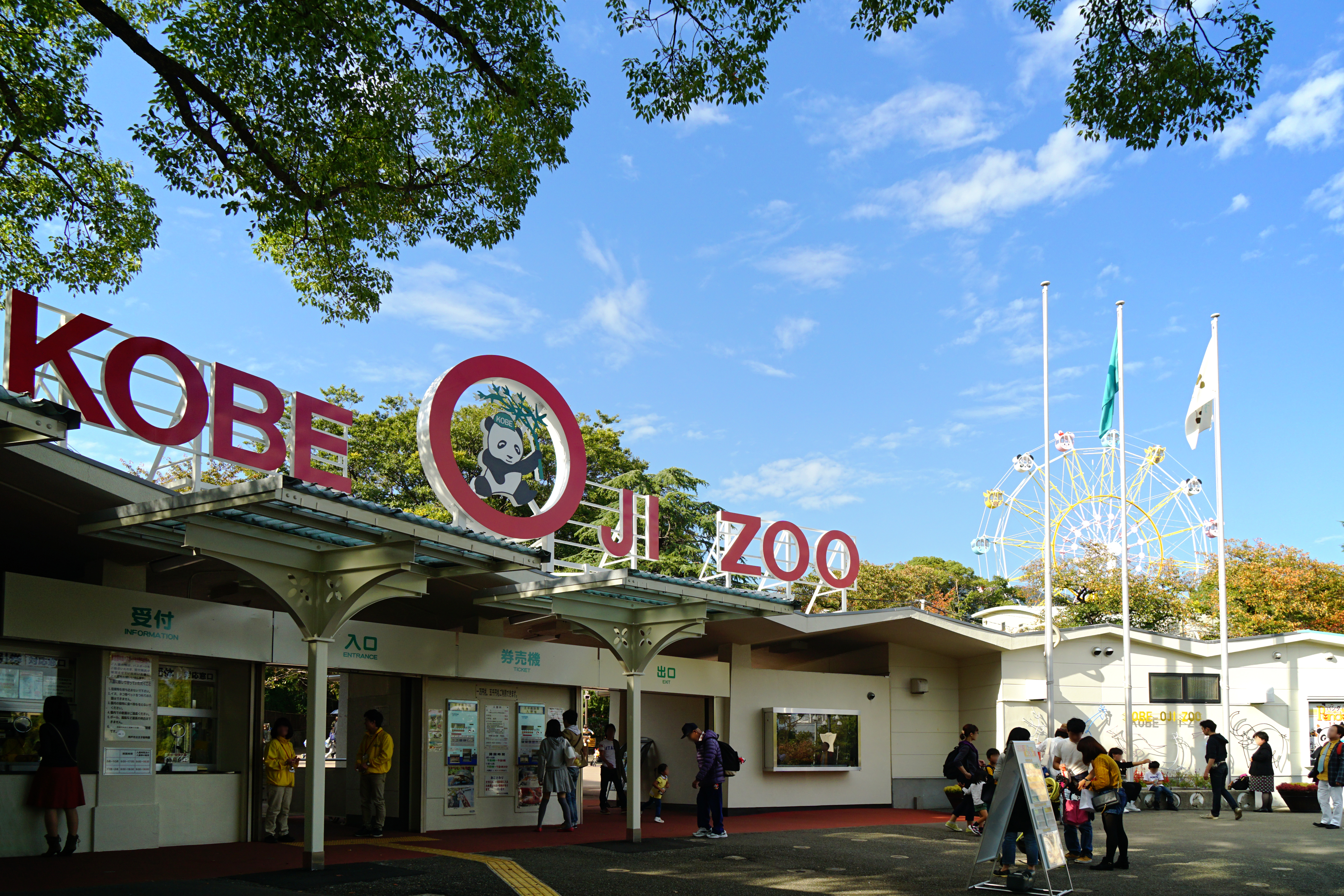
- Interactive map of Ōji Zoo
- 34.71°N 135.214°E
- Date opened: 1951
- Location: 3 Chome-1 Ōjichō, Nada-ku, Kōbe, Hyōgo Pref., Japan (兵庫県神戸市灘区王子町3-1)
- Memberships: JAZA
- Major exhibits: Pandas, polar bears, big cats
- Public transit: Railway: Ōji-kōen, Nada or Iwaya station
- Website: www.kobe-ojizoo.jp

Kōbe Ōji Zoo (神戸市立王子動物園, Kōbe-shiritsu Ōji Dōbutsuen), or simply Kobe Zoo or Ōji Zoo (王子動物園), is a municipal zoo in Kobe, Japan.

== Attractions ==
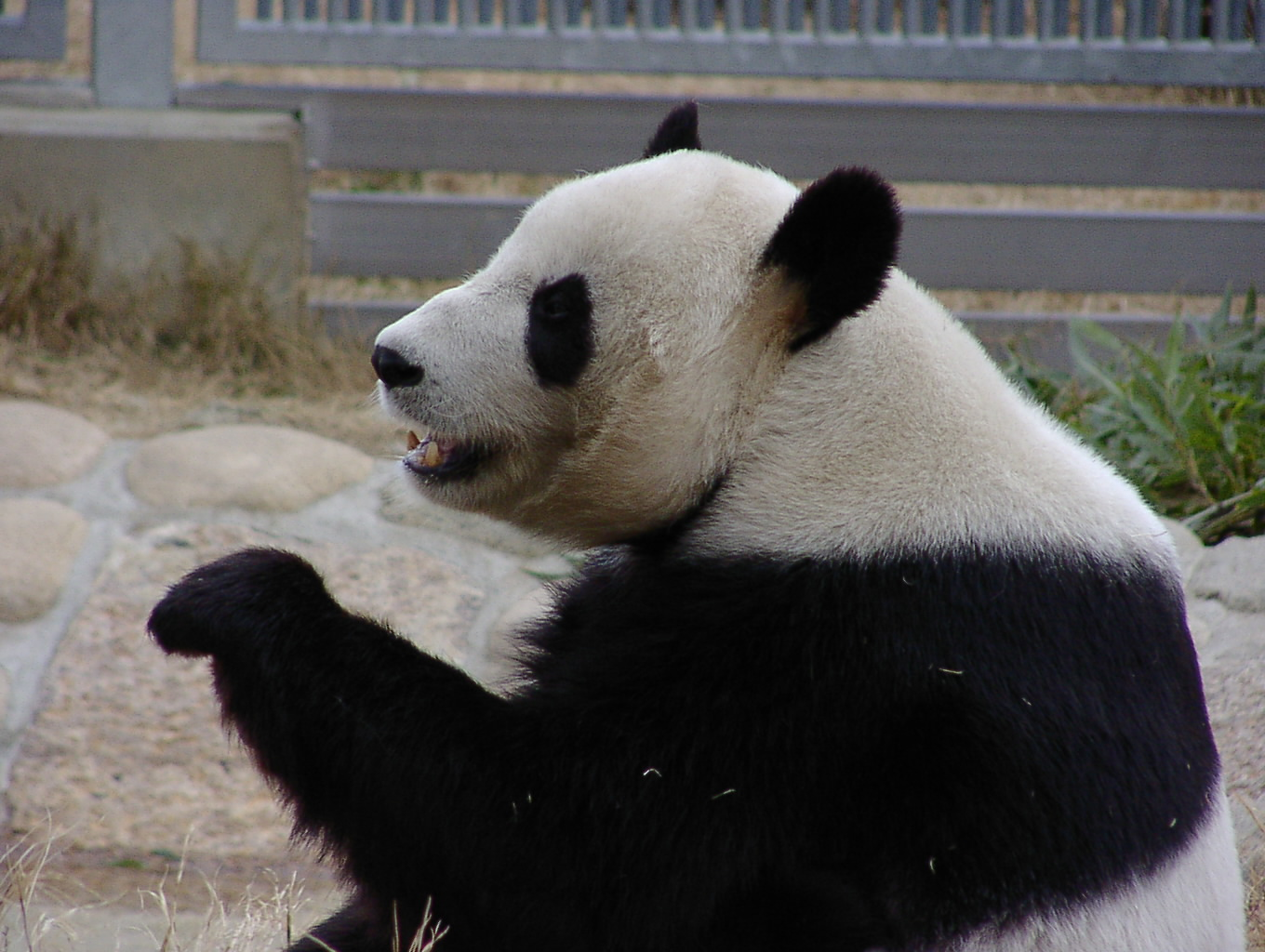
Panda at the zoo

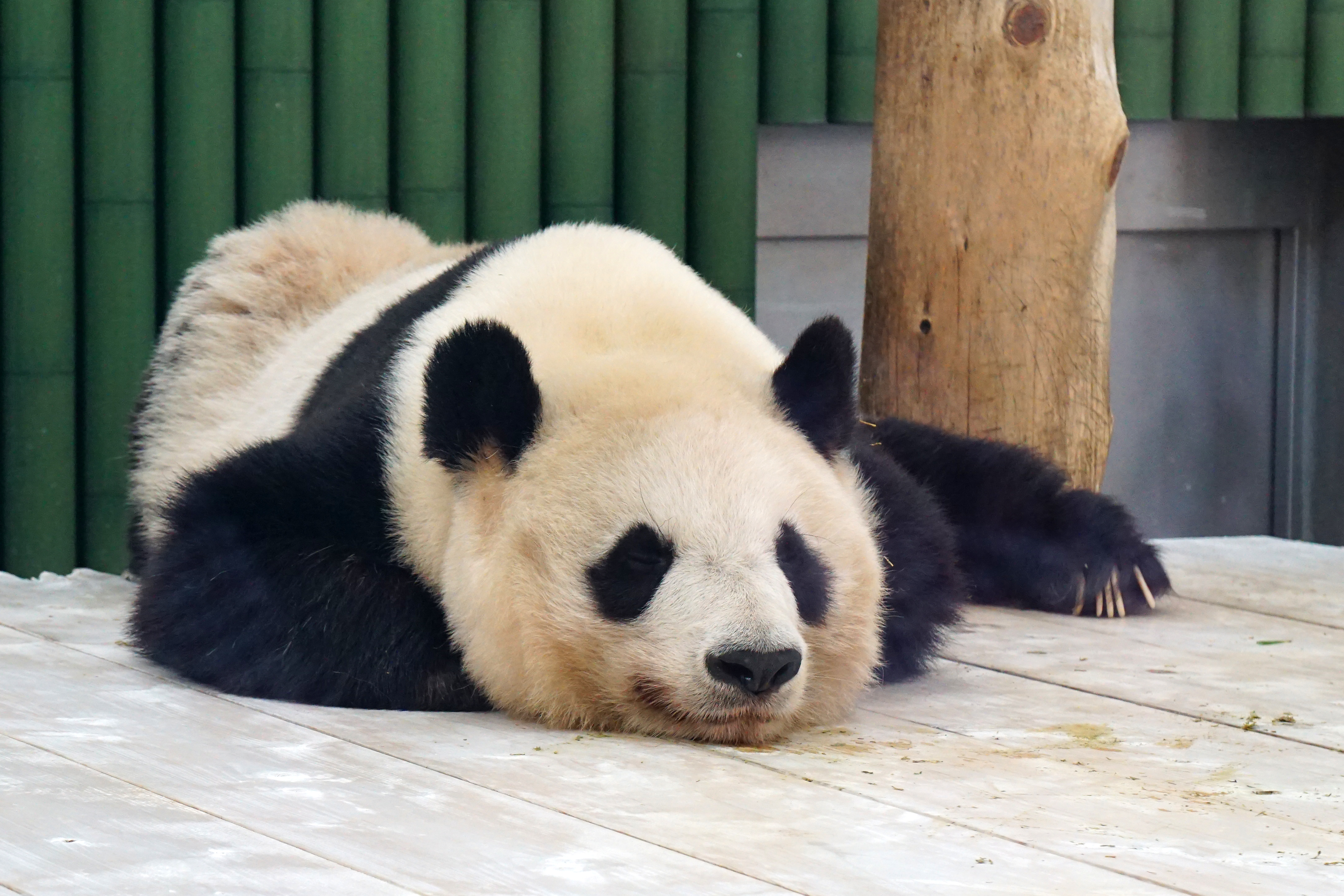
Panda at the zoo sleeping

- Panda House (パンダ館) – The zoo has kept giant pandas in its collection since 2000.
- Zoological Science Center (動物科学資料館) – An indoor educational center featuring skeletal specimens and a reading room.
- Big Cats Circle (円形猛獣舎) – This area houses tigers, lions, leopards, snow leopards, and jaguars.
- Polar Bear House (ホッキョクグマ舎) – This area houses polar bears, and has aboveground and underwater viewing areas.
- Animals' Land & Children's Zoo (動物とこどもの国) – This area houses farm animals, small domestic animals, and some exotic animals, such as red pandas, otters and koalas.
- A small amusement park (遊園地) – Rides and games for children, including a Ferris wheel and chair swing ride.
- The E.H. Hunter House (旧ハンター住宅) – The former residence of the founder of Osaka Iron Works, Edward Hazlett Hunter. An elaborate example of a 19th century ijinkan (異人館; "foreign home"), it is located at the northeast corner the zoo (hence not accessible outside zoo hours). The interior – with roped-off period furniture – is only open a few months each year. It was designated an Important Cultural Property by both the prefecture and the nation.

Other animals in the zoo's collection include giraffes, zebras, kangaroos, ostriches, flamingos, hippos, some species of ape, crocodiles, bobcats, sea lions, snowy owls and elephants.

== Surrounding ==
Technically, the zoo is situated within Ōji Park (王子公園, Ōji Kōen), but the zoo is enclosed and has admission fees. Surrounding the zoo are the various parts of a sports complex. To the zoo's northwest is the Ōji Sports Center (王子スポーツセンター, Ōji Supōtsu Sentā). To the northeast are some tennis courts; to the east is Ōji Stadium; to the southwest is the Museum of Literature.
