= Ōji-kōen Station =

Railway station in Kobe, Japan

Ōji-kōen
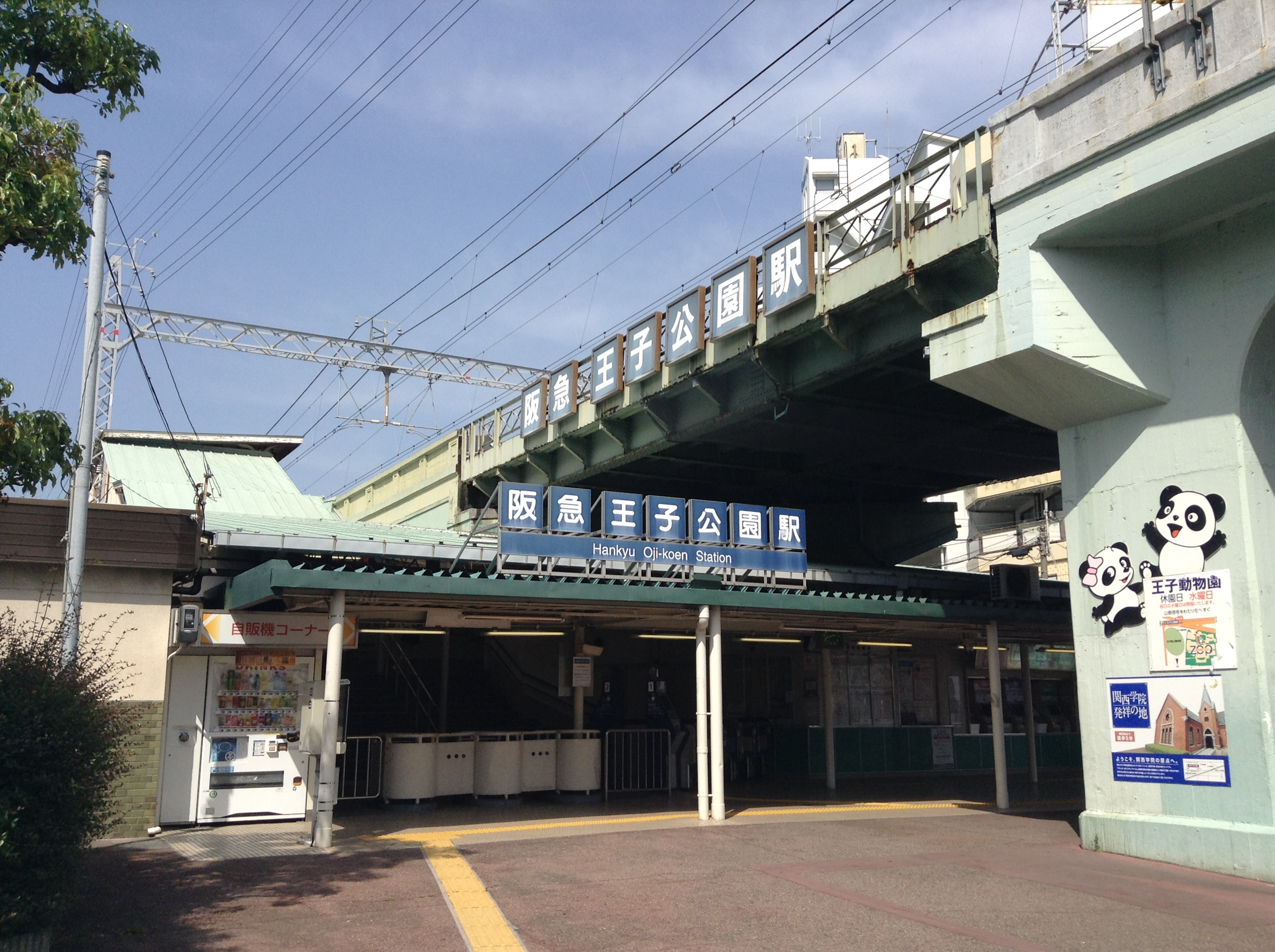
- Hankyu Ōji-kōen Station entrance (2014)

General information
- Location: Chūō-ku, Kobe; Hyōgo Prefecture; Japan
- Coordinates: 34.710260°N 135.218917°E
- System: Train station
- Operator: Hankyu Railway
- Line: Hankyū Kōbe Main Line

Other information
- Station code: HK-14

History
- Opened: 1 April 1936

Services
Hankyu Railway Kōbe Main Line (HK-14)
Limited Express: Does not stop at this station
Commutation Limited Express: Does not stop at this station
Semi limited Express: Does not stop at this station
Rokko (HK-13)	Express	Kasuganomichi (HK-15)
Rokko (HK-13)	Commutation Express	Kasuganomichi (HK-15)
Rokko (HK-13)	Local	Kasuganomichi (HK-15)
Location
Notes
- 春日野道

Ōji-kōen Station (王子公園駅, Ōji-kōen-eki) is a railway station in Nada-ku, Kobe, Hyōgo Prefecture, Japan. It is located at the southeastern corner of Ōji Park, which includes Ōji Stadium and the city zoo (Ōji Zoo).

== Layout ==
Ōji-kōen is an elevated station. It is served by two side platforms serving two tracks.

1	■ Kobe Line	for Kobe-sannomiya, Shinkaichi and Sanyo Electric Railway
2	■ Kobe Line	for Nishinomiya-Kitaguchi, Osaka (Umeda), Kyoto and Takarazuka

== History ==
The station opened on 1 April 1936.

The station building was relocated in October 1956.

Ōji-kōen Station was damaged by the Great Hanshin earthquake in January 1995. Restoration work on the Kobe Line took 7 months to complete.

Station numbering was introduced on 21 December 2013, with Ōji-kōen being designated as station number HK-14.
