= Kobe Oji Stadium =

Athletic stadium in Kobe, Hyōgo, Japan

- 神戸市王子スタジアム
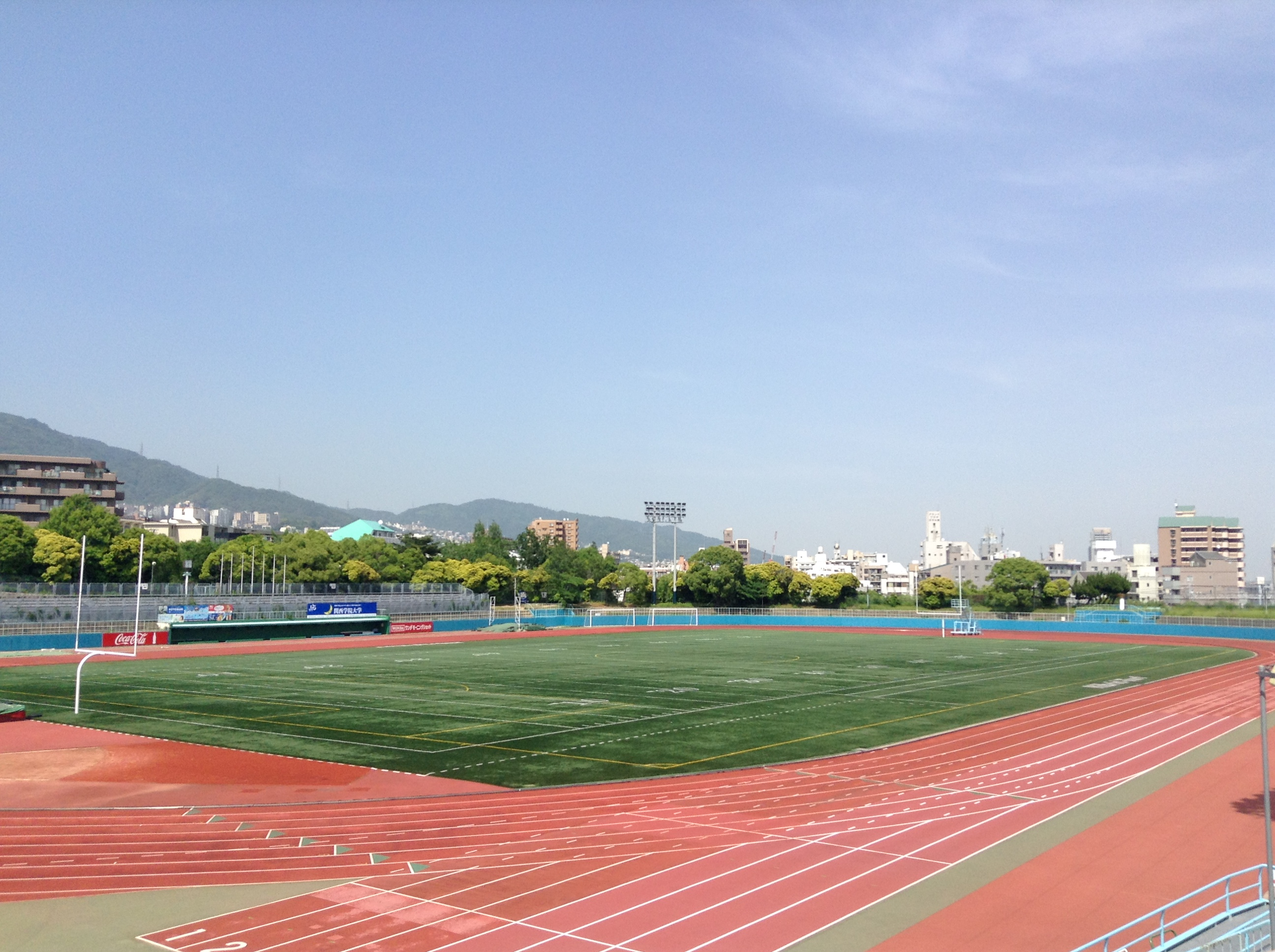
- Interactive map of Kobe Oji Stadium
- Location: Kobe, Hyogo, Japan
- Coordinates: 34.71084°N 135.21723°E
- Owner: Kobe City

Construction
- Opened: 1951

Kobe Oji Stadium (神戸市王子スタジアム, Kōbe-shiritsu Ōji Sutajiamu), or simply Ōji Stadium, is an athletic stadium in Kobe, Hyōgo, Japan. It is east of Ōji Zoo and south of the Ōji Sports Center's auxiliary stadium (王子スポーツセンター補助競技場, Ōji Supōtsu Sentā Hojo Kyōgijō).

It hosted the 1963 Emperor's Cup. The final game between Waseda University and Hitachi was played there on January 15, 1964.
