= Kasuganomichi Station (Hankyu) =

Railway station in Kobe, Japan

Coordinates: 34.7030°N 135.2053°E

Kasuganomichi 春日野道
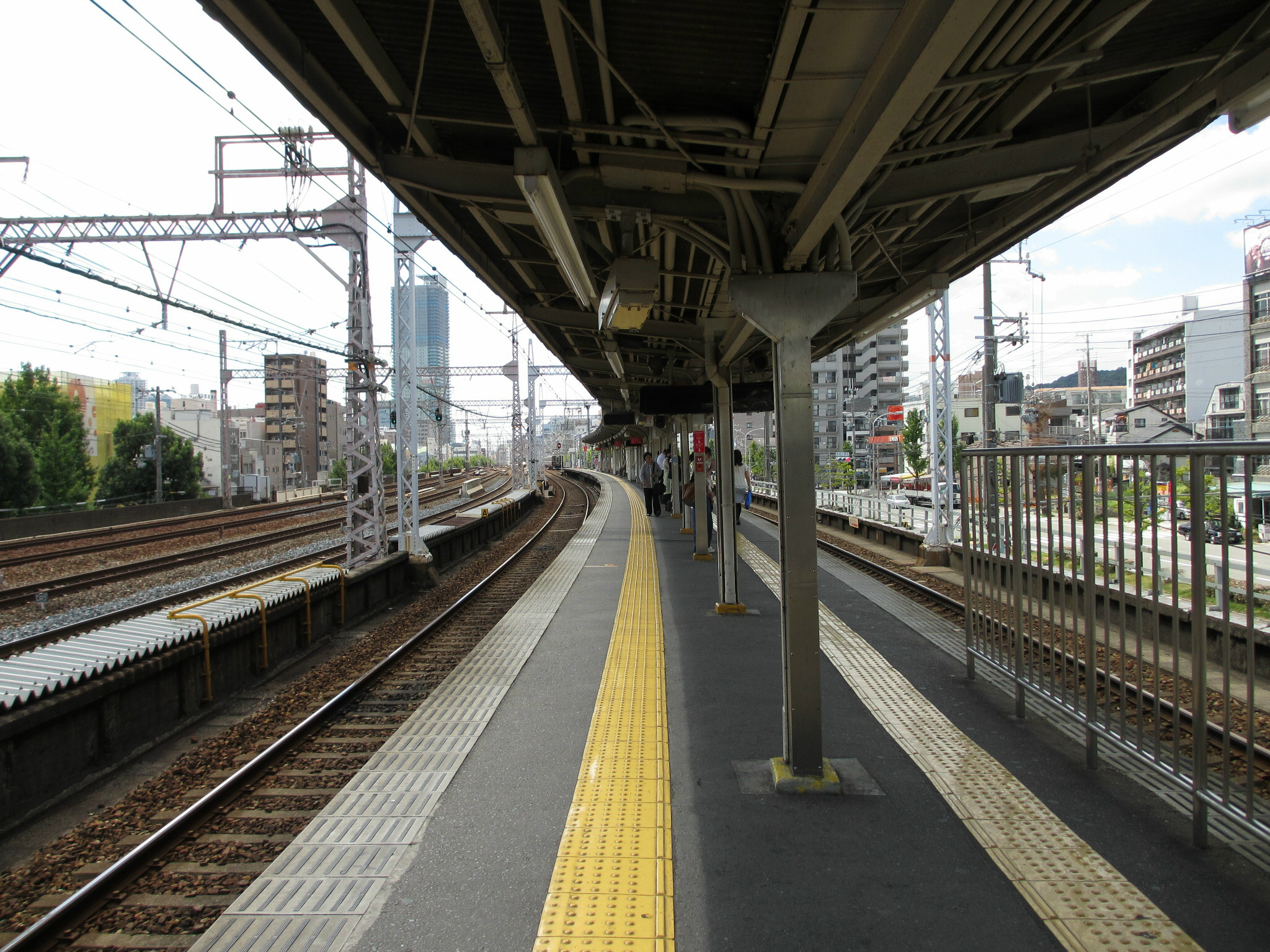
- Hankyu Kasuganomichi Station platform

General information
- Location: Chūō-ku, Kobe; Hyōgo Prefecture; Japan
- System: Train station
- Operator: Hankyu Railway
- Line: Hankyū Kōbe Main Line

Other information
- Station code: HK-15

History
- Opened: 1 April 1936

Services
Hankyu Railway Kōbe Main Line (HK-15)
Limited Express: Does not stop at this station
Commutation Limited Express: Does not stop at this station
Semi limited Express: Does not stop at this station
Ōji-kōen (HK-14)	Express	Kobe-Sannomiya (HK-16)
Ōji-kōen (HK-14)	Commutation Express	Kobe-sannomiya (HK-16)
Ōji-kōen (HK-14)	Local	Kobe-Sannomiya (HK-16)
Location

Kasuganomichi Station (春日野道駅, Kasuganomichi-eki) is a train station in Chūō-ku, Kobe, Hyōgo Prefecture, Japan.

== Lines ==
- Hankyu Railway
  - Kōbe Main Line

== Layout ==
The station is served by a single island platform serving two tracks.

1	■ Kobe Line	for Kobe-sannomiya, Shinkaichi and Sanyo Electric Railway
2	■ Kobe Line	for Nishinomiya-Kitaguchi, Osaka (Umeda), Kyoto and Takarazuka

== History ==
The station opened on 1 April 1936.

Operations were suspended from June 1945 until May 1946.

Kasuganomichi Station was damaged by the Great Hanshin earthquake in January 1995. Restoration work on the Kobe Line took 7 months to complete.

Station numbering was introduced on 21 December 2013, with Kasuganomichi being designated as station number HK-15.

Upgrades were done to the station starting in November 2020 to promote universal design. This included the installation of elevators and accessible washrooms.
