= 1963 Emperor's Cup =

Japanese football tournament

Tournament details
- Country: Japan
- Teams: 7

Final positions
- Champions: Waseda University
- Runners-up: Hitachi
- Semifinalists: Sumitomo Rubber; Kansai University

Tournament statistics
- Matches played: 6
- Goals scored: 18 (3 per match)

Statistics of Emperor's Cup in the 1963 season. The cup was held between January 12 and January 15, 1964.

== Overview ==
It was contested by 7 teams, and Waseda University won the championship.

== Results ==
=== Quarterfinals ===
- Sumitomo Rubber 2–1 Chuo University
- Hitachi 1–1 (lottery) Yawata Steel
- Waseda University 2–1 Toyo Industries

=== Semifinals ===
- Sumitomo Rubber 0–4 Hitachi
- Waseda University 2–1 Kansai University

=== Final ===
- Hitachi 0–3 Waseda University

Waseda University won the championship.
